= Twelve Prophets of Aleijadinho =

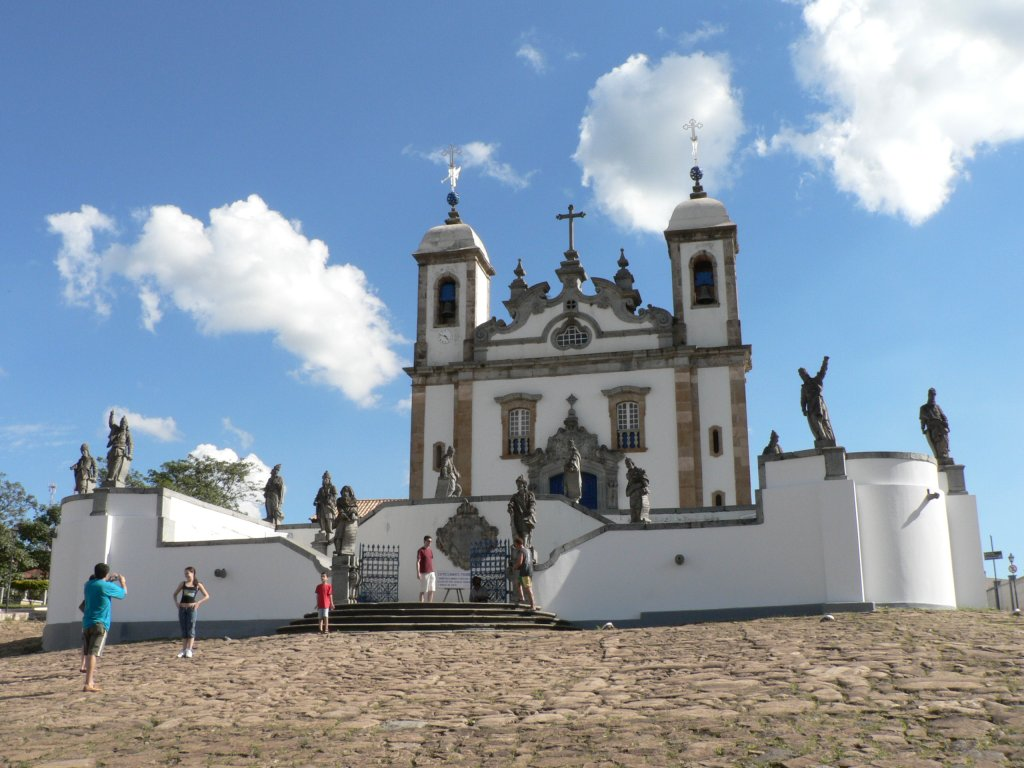
From left to right: Amos, Obadiah, Jonah, Baruch, Isaiah, Daniel, Jeremiah, Hosea, Ezekiel, Joel, Habakkuk, and Nahum

The Twelve Prophets are a set of soapstone sculptures completed between 1800 and 1805 by the artist Antônio Francisco Lisboa, commonly known as Aleijadinho. The sculptures are located in the Brazilian municipality of Congonhas, where they adorn the forecourt of the Santuário do Bom Jesus de Matosinhos. These sculptures, along with the basilica, were given World Heritage Site status by UNESCO in 1985 because of their extraordinary contribution to Baroque art.

== The Twelve Prophets ==
Each sculpture in the series commemorates a prophet of the Hebrew Bible. The twelve sculptures do not correspond to the Twelve Minor Prophets, but include some of the Major Prophets and prophets whose works are part of the Old Testament deuterocanon. Each figure holds a scroll with a text, in Latin, from their biblical writings.

Amazing spirit and power emanates from the heroic figures of the twelve prophets. ...Highly theatrical, the figures show individuality and inner greatness, held fast by the massiveness of their material - stone.

It is likely that Aleijadinho himself, in his 70s when these works were completed, only carved the top half of the figures, the lower portions being executed by other carvers of his workshop. During this time in his life Aleijadinho, who suffered a debilitating disease believed to be leprosy, did all his carving behind screens in this workshop, "his chisel and mallet strapped to the stumps of his deformed hands."

It has been noted that two of the statues, Joel and Jonah, seem to have had their positions reversed. "[T]he direction of the gaze of these two figures appears to out of harmony with the arrangement of the others." Also, if the positions of these two statues were reversed, then all of the figures would be placed in chronological order.

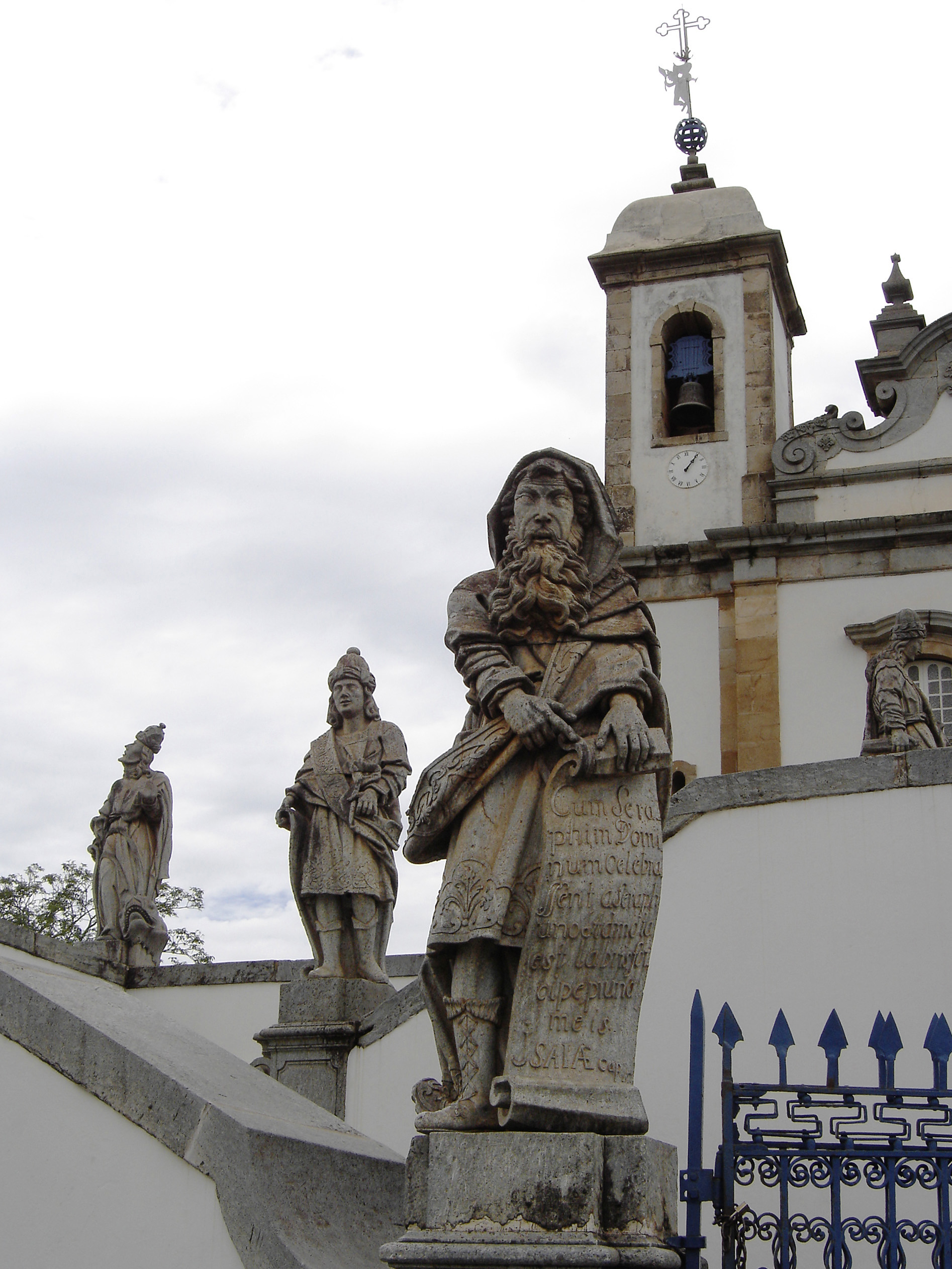
Isaiah

=== Isaiah ===
A prophet of the Old Testament, Isaiah, opens the series at the staircase entrance on the left side of the Santuário. This sculpture has features characteristic of a person of advanced age, including a full beard and thick hair. He wears a short tunic, which covers his lower legs and boots sidewalks, and over which in draped a large mantle. He holds a parchment scroll from his left hand, while the right points to the text inscribed upon it.

Aleijadinho's sculptures present strong evidence of anatomical errors, including a disproportion between the upper and lower body, narrow shoulders, and rigidly short arms. This may result from the figure being completed by one of the assistants in his studio. The expression on the face of Isaiah is characteristic of the genius of Aleijadinho. The expression presents that of a truly enlightened visage, thus becoming one of the most important pieces of the whole architectural complex.

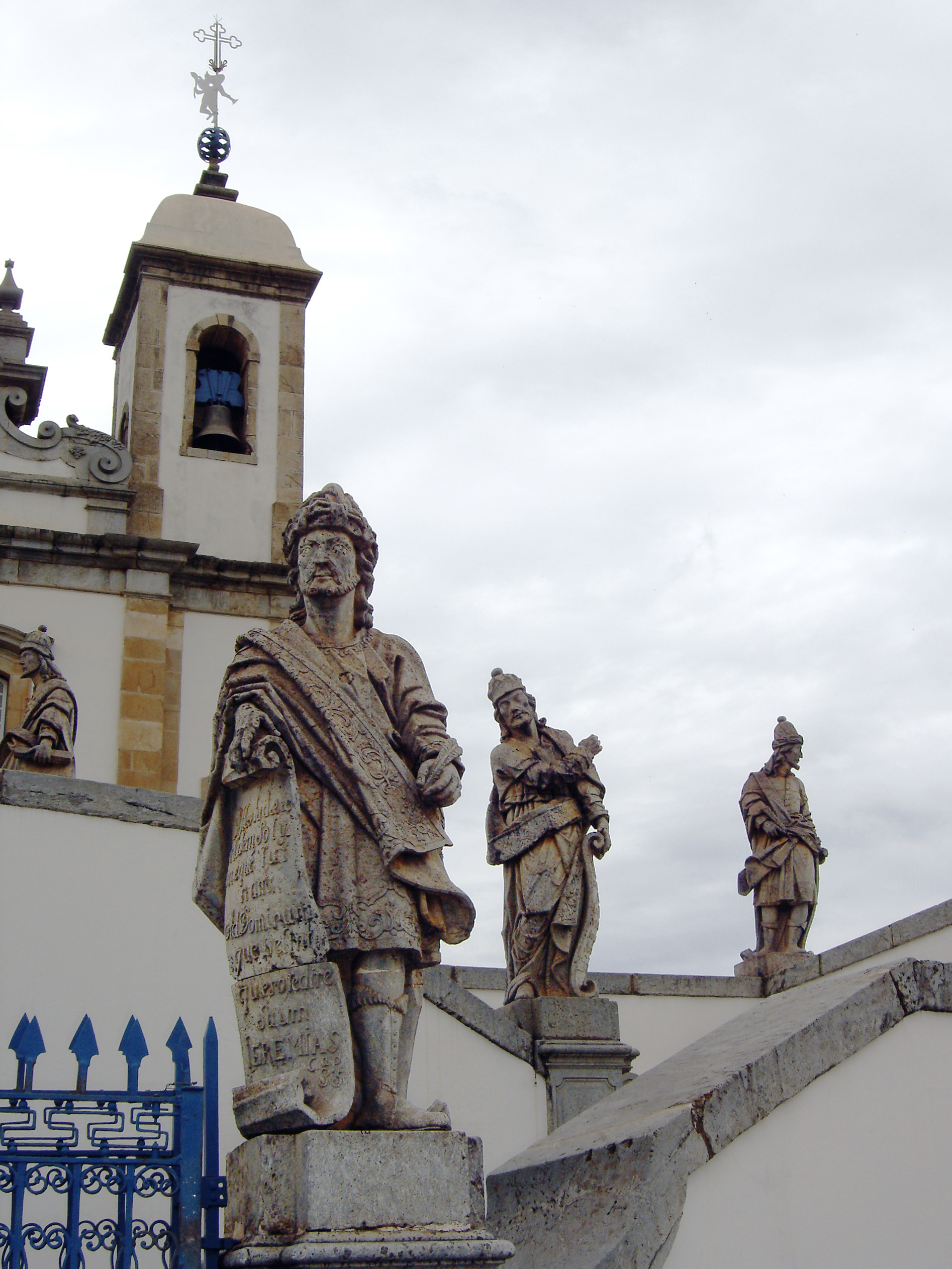
Jeremiah

=== Jeremiah ===
To the right of Isaiah and also occupying a prominent position at the entrance of the staircase, is the prophet Jeremiah, the second author of a prophetic book in the order of the Christian canon.

The physical form of the sculpture is that of a middle-aged man with long whiskers on the sides of his mouth and a short beard of crisped rolls, in the Byzantine style. He wears short tunic, leaving the left leg revealed, which is draped over the right shoulder to fall downwards to the top of the feet. He secures firmly a parchment with his right hand and holds in his left a pen. Capping the head is a magnificent turban, edged with twisted flaps passing beneath the brim. Like the statue of Isaiah, Jeremiah is slightly smaller than the remaining statues. From an anatomical point of view, this statue also has deformities. However, despite the noticeable defects, there is intervention of Aleijadinho in the execution of the head, where, no doubt, is concentrated all the real power of the image.

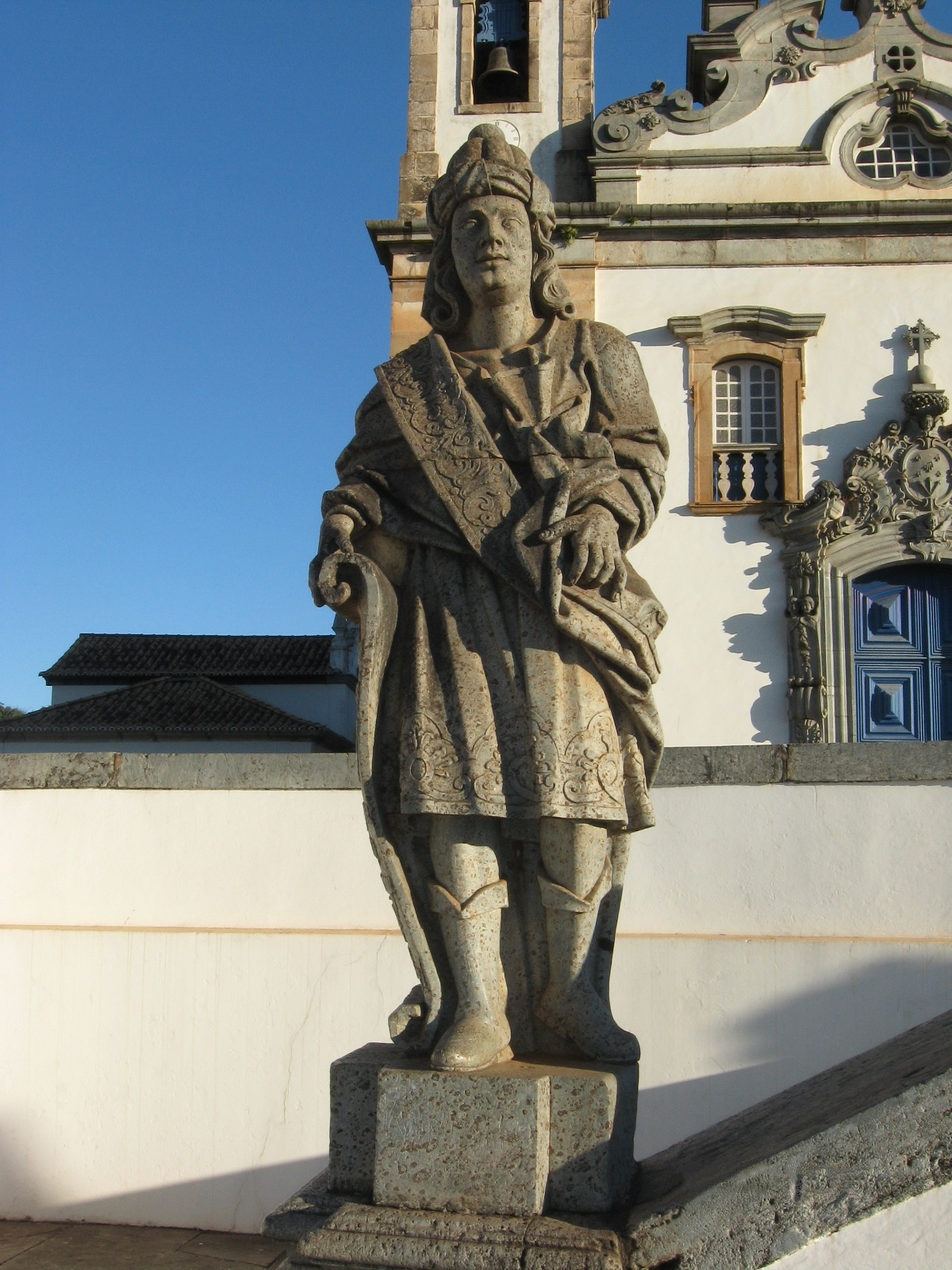
Baruch

=== Baruch ===
Although he is not counted among the prophets of the Hebrew Tanakh, the inclusion of Baruch in the Congonhas statuary reflects his importance as Jeremiah's scribe, and the prominence of the Book of Baruch in both the Septuagint and Vulgate Bible.

Baruch holds forth a parchment whose quotations are a synthesis of several passages of his book. The sculpture, located on the pedestal that finishes off the wall alignment of the central courtyard, is a young and beardless figure, clad in short tunic, cloak, and boots. He wears a turban decorated with a brim similar to that of the prophet Jeremiah. With one hand he holds the folds of his mantle, while in the other he bears the parchment. The piece, with its squat proportions and anatomical errors evident, is one of the weakest of the set. As with the other figures, however, the strength of the image comes from the expression on his face.

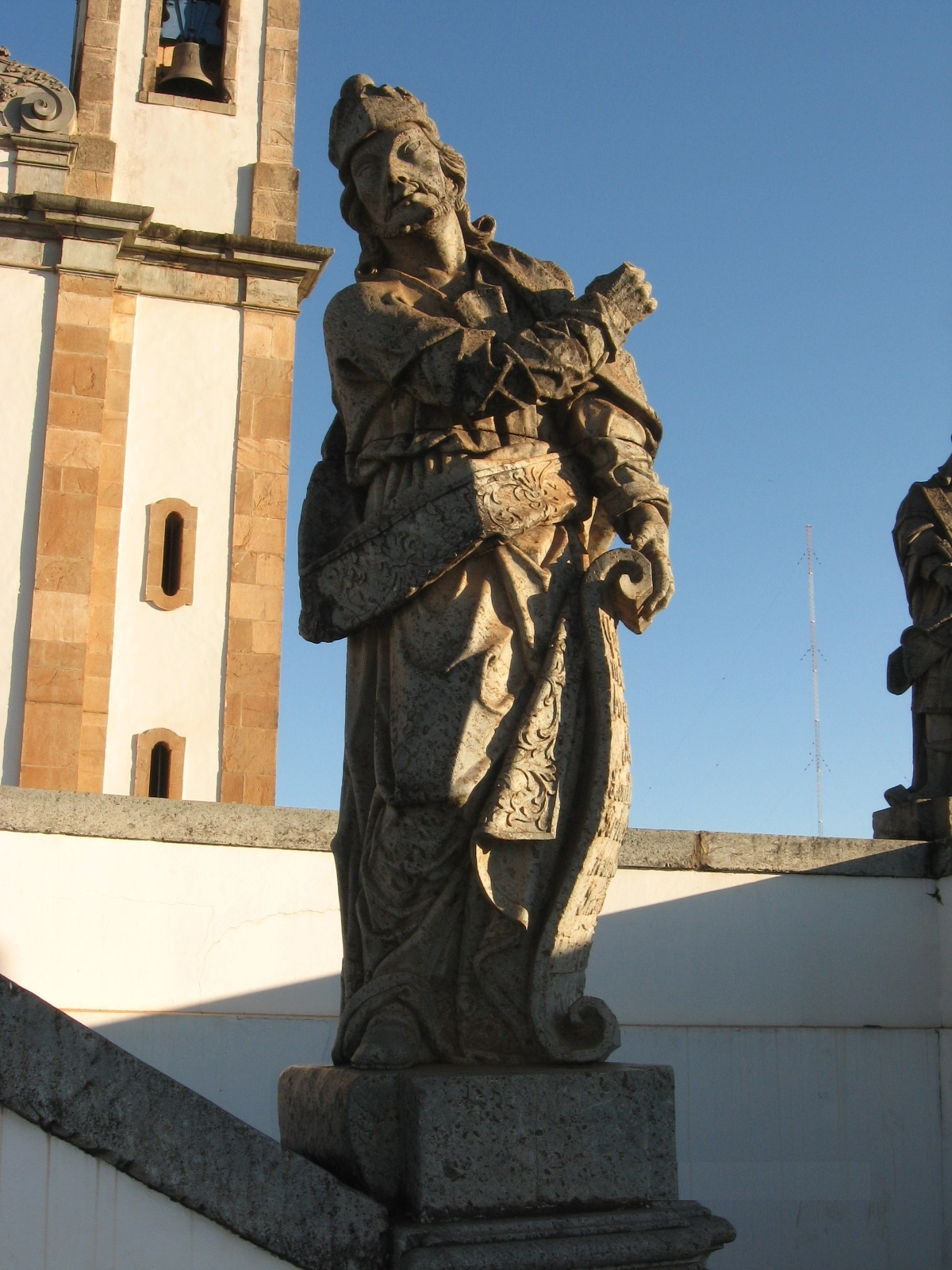
Ezekiel

=== Ezekiel ===
Standing opposite Baruch, on a pedestal of the central wall dividing the forecourt, is Ezekiel, also known as the prophet of the exile for having been banished to Babylon with the people of Israel.

The inscription upon the scroll combines three successive portions of the prophet's vision: first, the four winged creatures with four faces each, then four wheels of a chariot of fire supporting a sapphire throne, and finally on the throne, the god of Israel himself. The style of face on Ezekiel is much the same as Jeremiah. He displays a mustache and short beard, with frizzled curls of long hair falling upon the neck. Instead of a short tunic, the prophet wears a tunic that is long and belted, leaving uncovered only the tip of the right foot. In place of a turban, Ezekiel's head bears a cap with a visor attached by a loop above the neck. Covering the whole back of the piece, the mantle is magnificently decorated with a plaited band. The sculpture suffered little intervention in the workshop. Its great strength of expression shows particular care by Aleijadinho in its execution. Apart from the impressive expression of the face, there is also lifelike movement suggested in the bending the right arm.

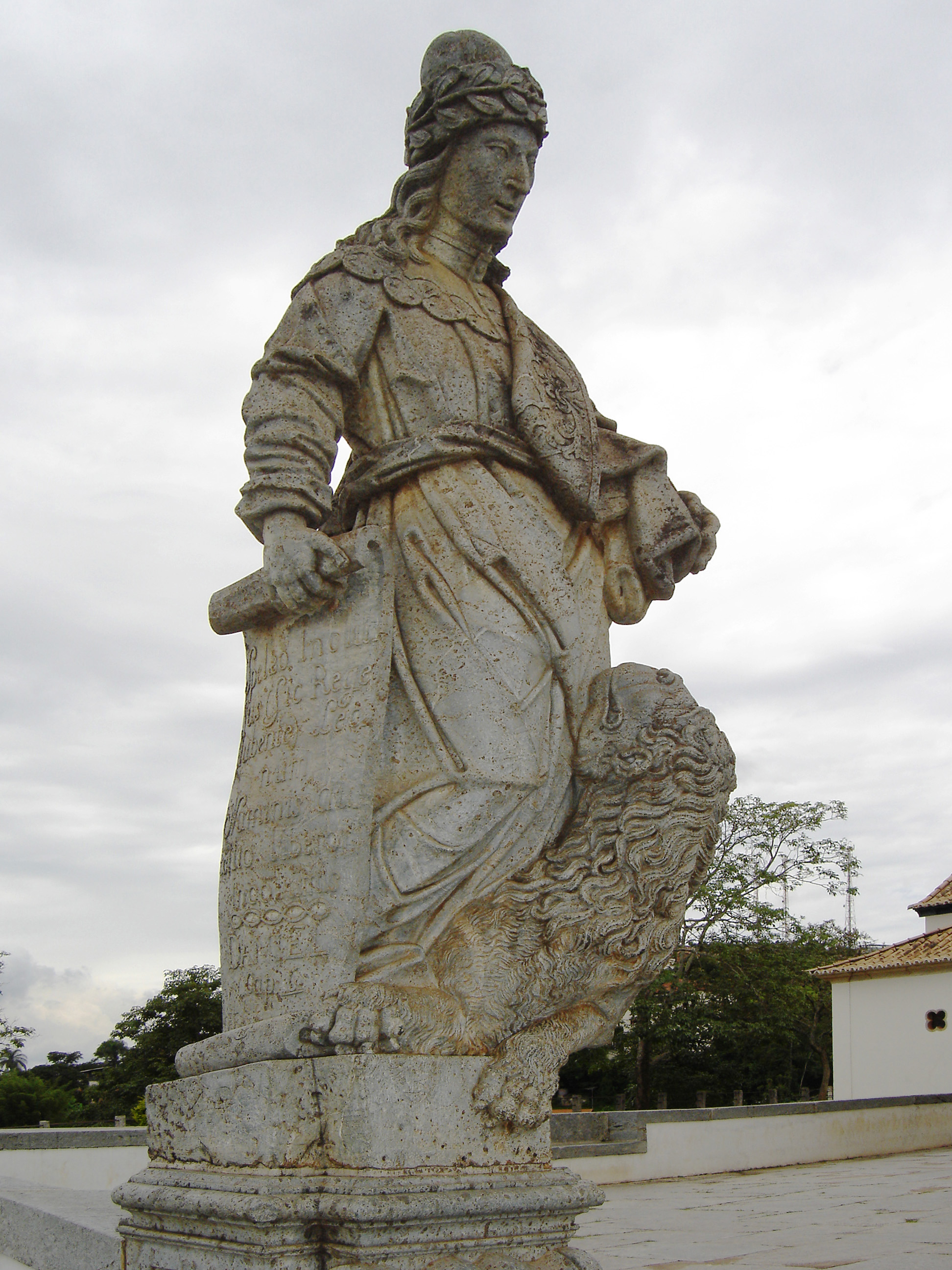
Daniel

=== Daniel ===
The prophet Daniel flanks the entrance passage to the courtyard, and occupies a position both facing and corresponding to that of Hosea on the opposite side. This juxtaposition of the last of the major prophets and first of the minor prophets reveals, once again, how the series as a whole utilizes iconography in the positions of the statues within the forecourt.

The face of Daniel portrays a beardless youth, as Baruch and Obadiah. However, the physiognomy of Daniel differs from theirs, especially in the carving of the eyes, the mouth and nose long, with its flared nostrils. The visage as a whole reveals a lofty and distant expression, characteristic of a hero aware of his strength. A laurel wreath adorning the miter head accentuates this aspect, and is an obvious allusion to Daniel's victory over the lions, one of whom crouches at his right foot. Like Ezekiel, Daniel wears a long robe, tied at the waist by a belt, and buttoned at the collar. In this sculpture, it seems that Aleijadinho employed no assistance from his staff. It is the largest statue of the collection, both monolithic and particularly well executed, testifying to the skill behind its creation.

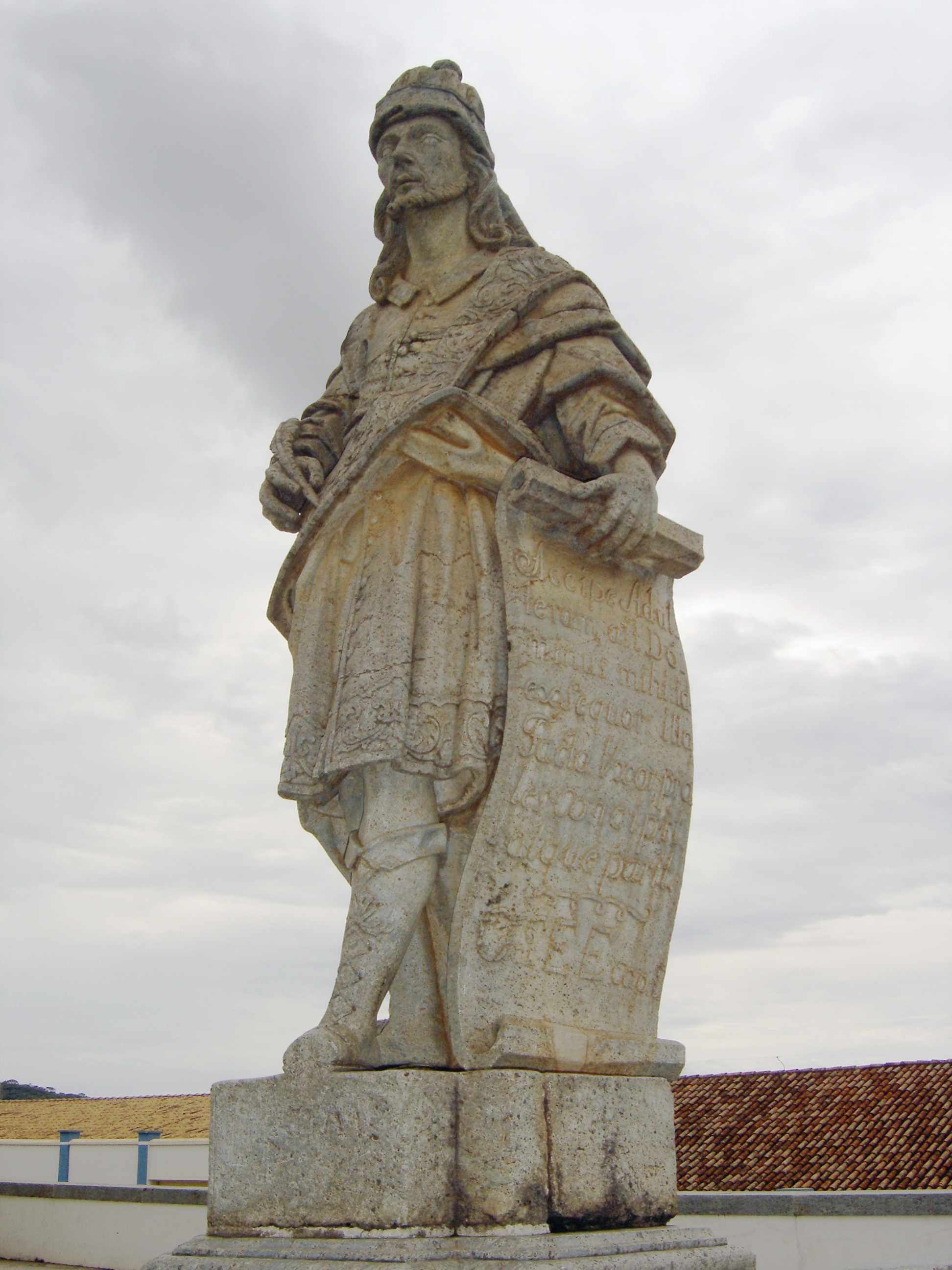
Hosea

=== Hosea ===
The first of the minor prophets, Hosea occupies a place in the sanctuary atop the pedestal that completes the parapet at the entrance of the forecourt. Hosea, like Ezekiel and Jeremiah, wears a short coat, buttoned to the collar bar and secured at his waist by a belt. His head is covered by a cap similar to that of Ezekiel, his legs by pants and buskin boots. He holds a pen in his right hand, whose tip is placed on the sash of the mantle, presenting an attitude of one who still is writing. The anatomy of the sculpture is correct, apart from a discrepancy between the length of the two arms.

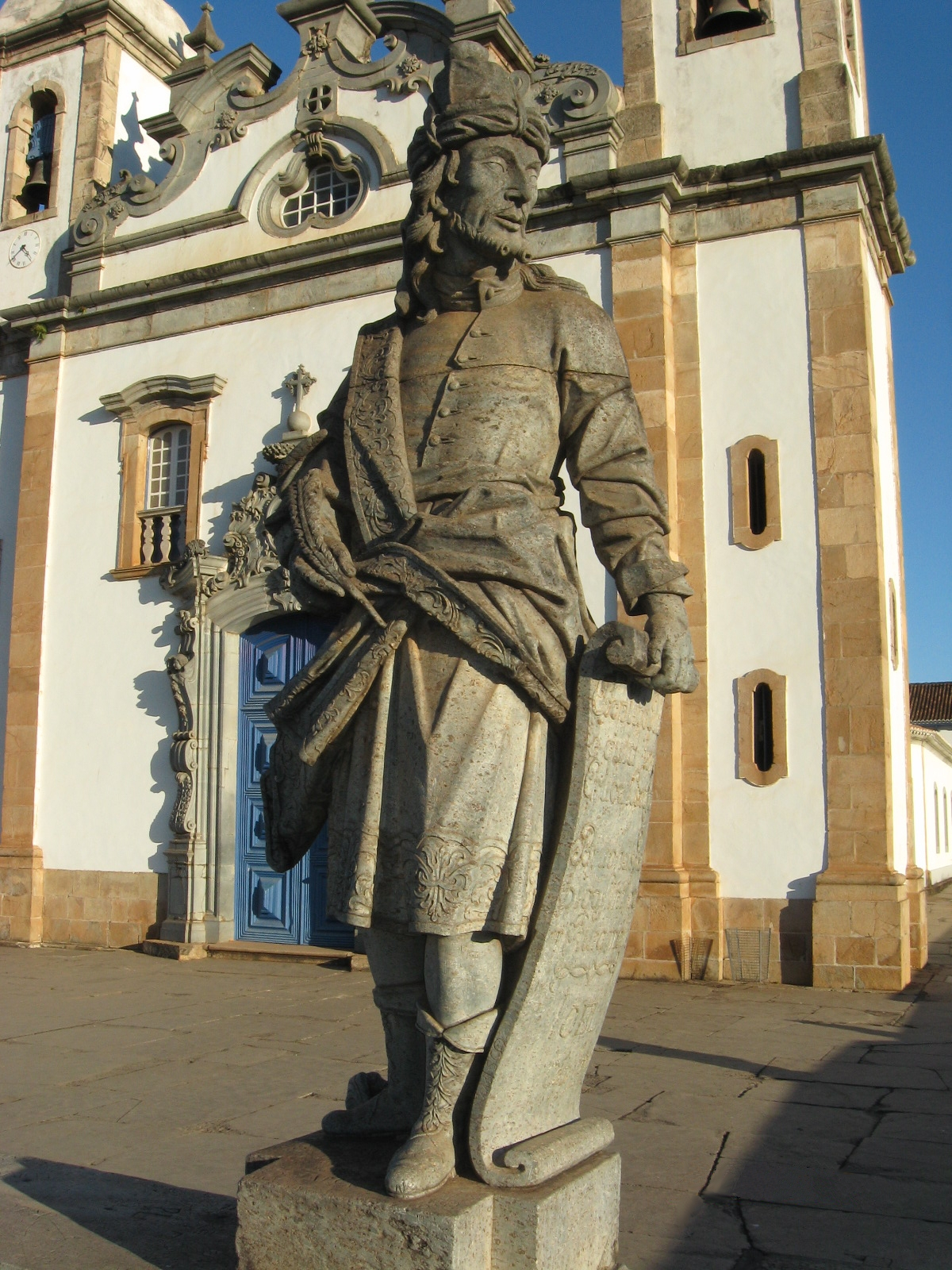
Joel

=== Joel ===
Joel, the second of the minor prophets in their traditional biblical sequence, takes his place in the churchyard to the right of Hosea, at the junction of the parapet entrance of the churchyard wall and the inner portion.

The sculpture's face, like that of Jeremiah, Ezekiel, and Hosea, is virile and masculine, with his beard and mustache set in Byzantine-style rolls. The garments are similar to those of Hosea, but with a higher collar. Joel's turban is similarly styled, with turned up brim, to those displayed on Jeremiah and Baruch. His head is thrust forward and his back curved. The statue exhibits virtually no anatomical imperfections. It is one of the most powerful of the whole set, and its force of expression reveals the careful attention of Aleijadinho in his execution.

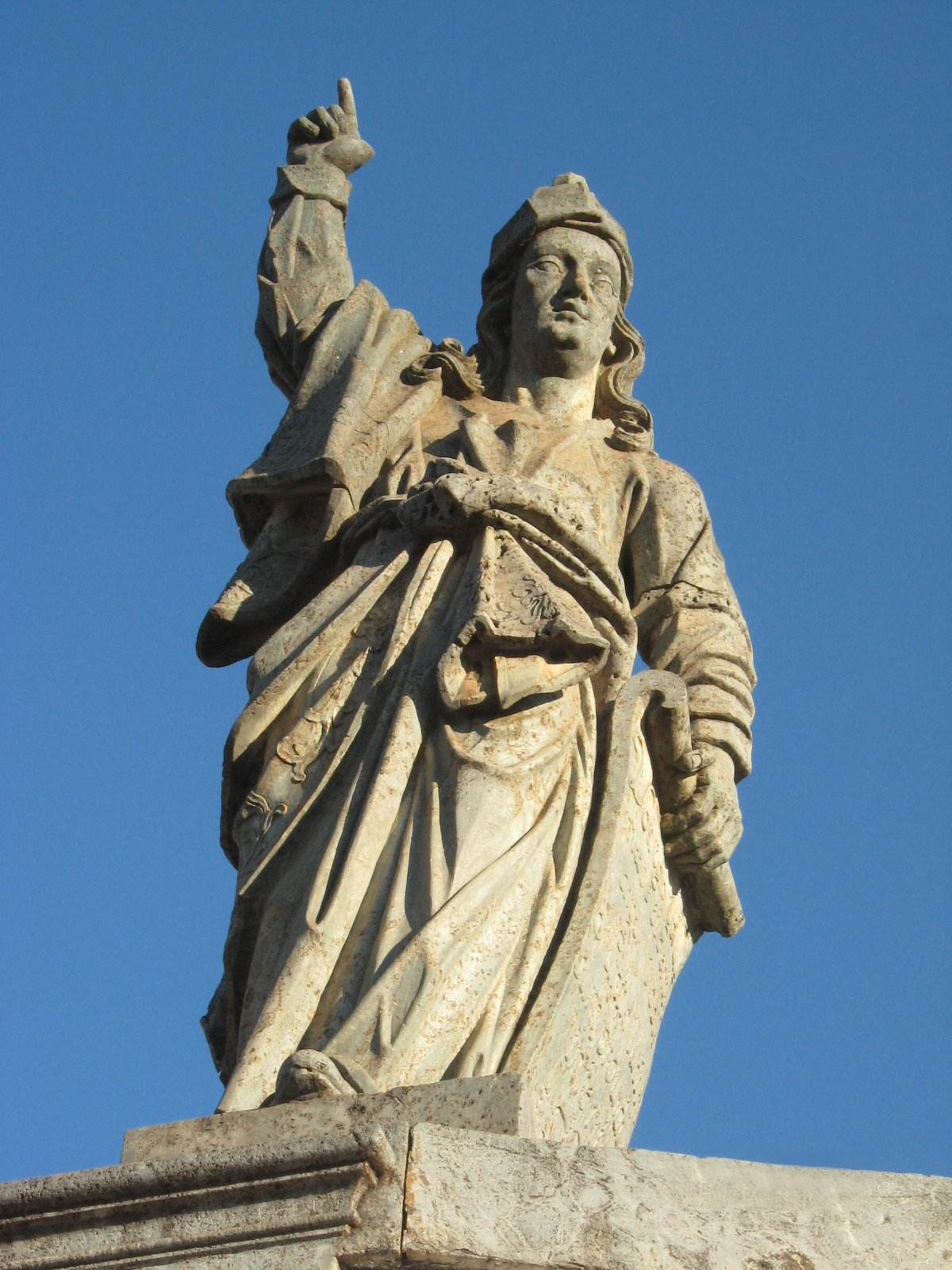
Obadiah

=== Obadiah ===
Obadiah stands at the very bottom of the churchyard walls, at the corner between walls of the front and left sides of the forecourt. The statue of Obadiah portrays a beardless youth, like Baruch, Daniel, and Amos, but the more slender proportions give the impression of a taller youth. Obadiah wears a tunic and mantle, supplemented only by a simple cap, but the arrangement of the folds is very well organized in a classical game of light and shadow.

This statue can be seen as contrasted with the prophet Habakkuk, who occupies an equivalent position at the opposite end of the forecourt. Functioning visually as bulwarks at each side of the churchyard, the statues of both Obadiah and Habakkuk have the same attitude of arms raised, same style of clothing, as well as the same seemingly complicated texture of drapery. For the positions they occupy, both statues received special care, and since the images are anatomically perfect, it is likely that there was little assistance provided by collaborators in his studio.

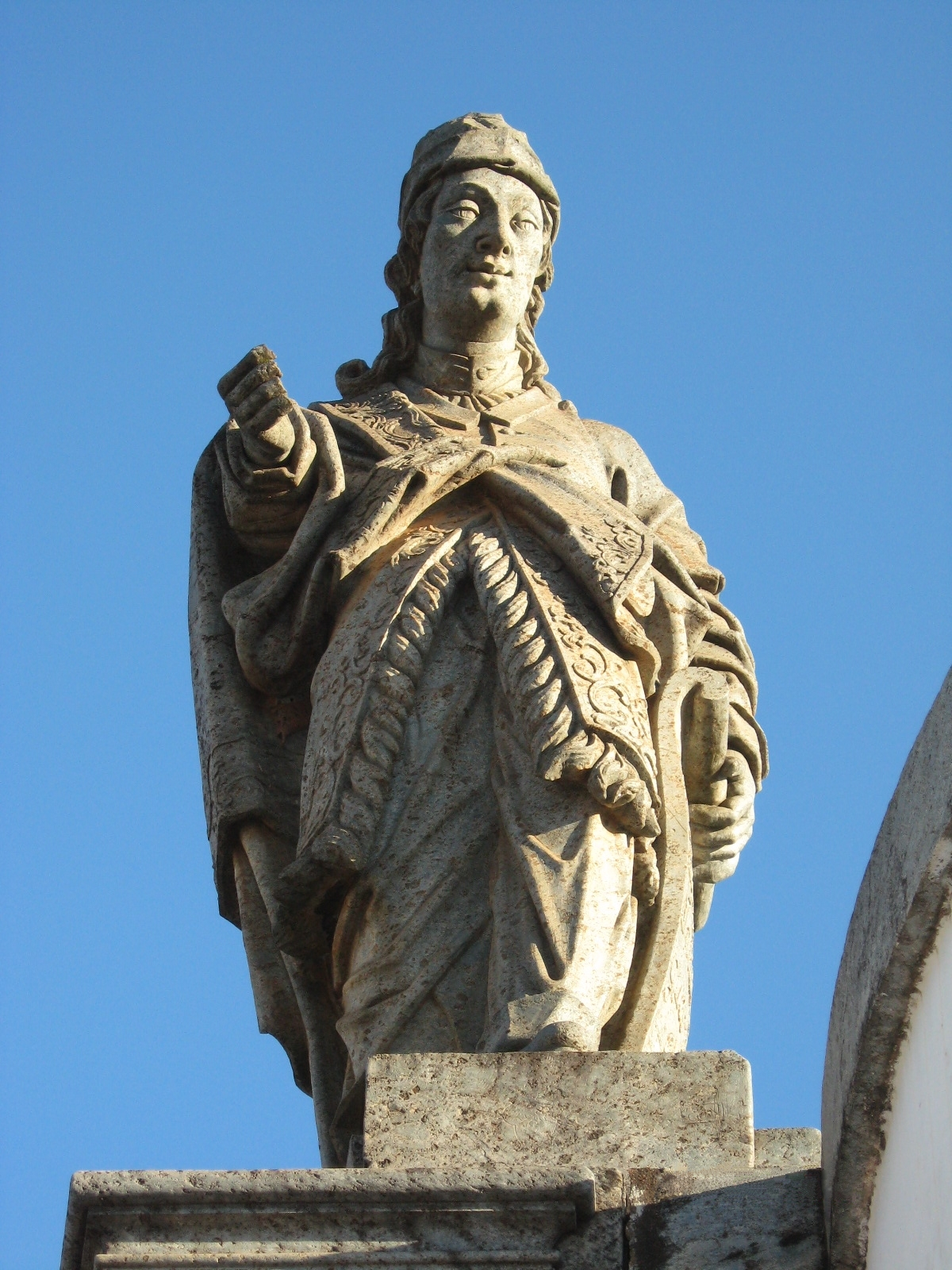
Amos

=== Amos ===
At the far left end of the forecourt, atop the great arc of a wall connecting the extreme front and side walls of the Santuário, stands the statue of the prophet Amos. The style of Amos differs completely from all the other prophets in the group, although these differences are most noticeable in the physical styling of his garment. His broad face is beardless with a calm expression, almost good-natured as befits a man of the field. His garments suit the vocation of a shepherd. Amos is dressed in a sort of jacket lined with sheepskin, and features a cap on his head similar to those Portuguese farmers still wear in the region.

Given the great height of the wall on which is placed, the sculpture seems to have been designed to be seen form its left side. On its right side, it presents a number of deficiencies, such as the omission of the trouser leg on this side. As with the statue of Daniel, it is an almost monolithic piece, with only a small seam at the top of the cap.

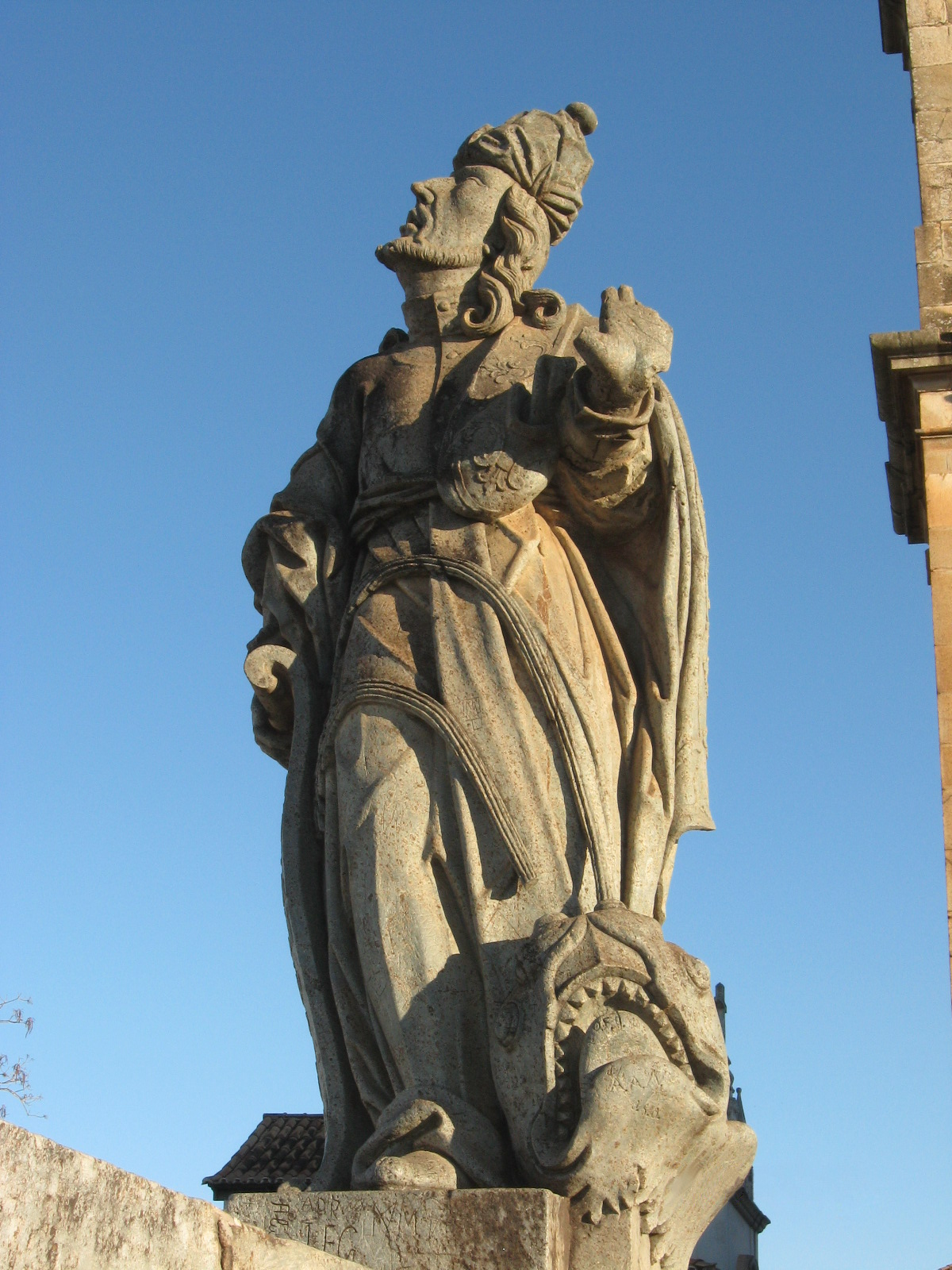
Jonah

=== Jonah ===
Occupying a position symmetrical to that of Joel, at the meeting point of the parapet walls that form the ingress to the left side of the forecourt, is the statue of Jonah. For this best-known of the minor prophets, Aleijadinho reserved pride of place, positioning it next to Daniel.

The statue of Jonah is crafted in the same style previously used for the figures of Jeremiah, Ezekiel, Hosea, and Joel. However, his countenance possesses unique features, such as an open mouth with teeth visible and his face turned upward. He holds up his left palm towards the viewer. Jonah's clothing is composed of a sort of cassock, with collar and buttoned to the waist, which is secured with a girdle. The prophet also bears a cloak thrown over his left shoulder, and the usual mitre-shaped turban, with upturned flaps.

The statue seems to have received the same special care that was bestowed on Daniel, and there is no evidence of finishing work from Aleijadinho's shop. Included in this piece are two additional aspects of creative genius that display a capacity for dramatic expression. The front view of the statue is as ornamental as the back, and the sinuous silhouette of the whale, complete with toothy maw, seems to emerge as if from a Rococo fountain.

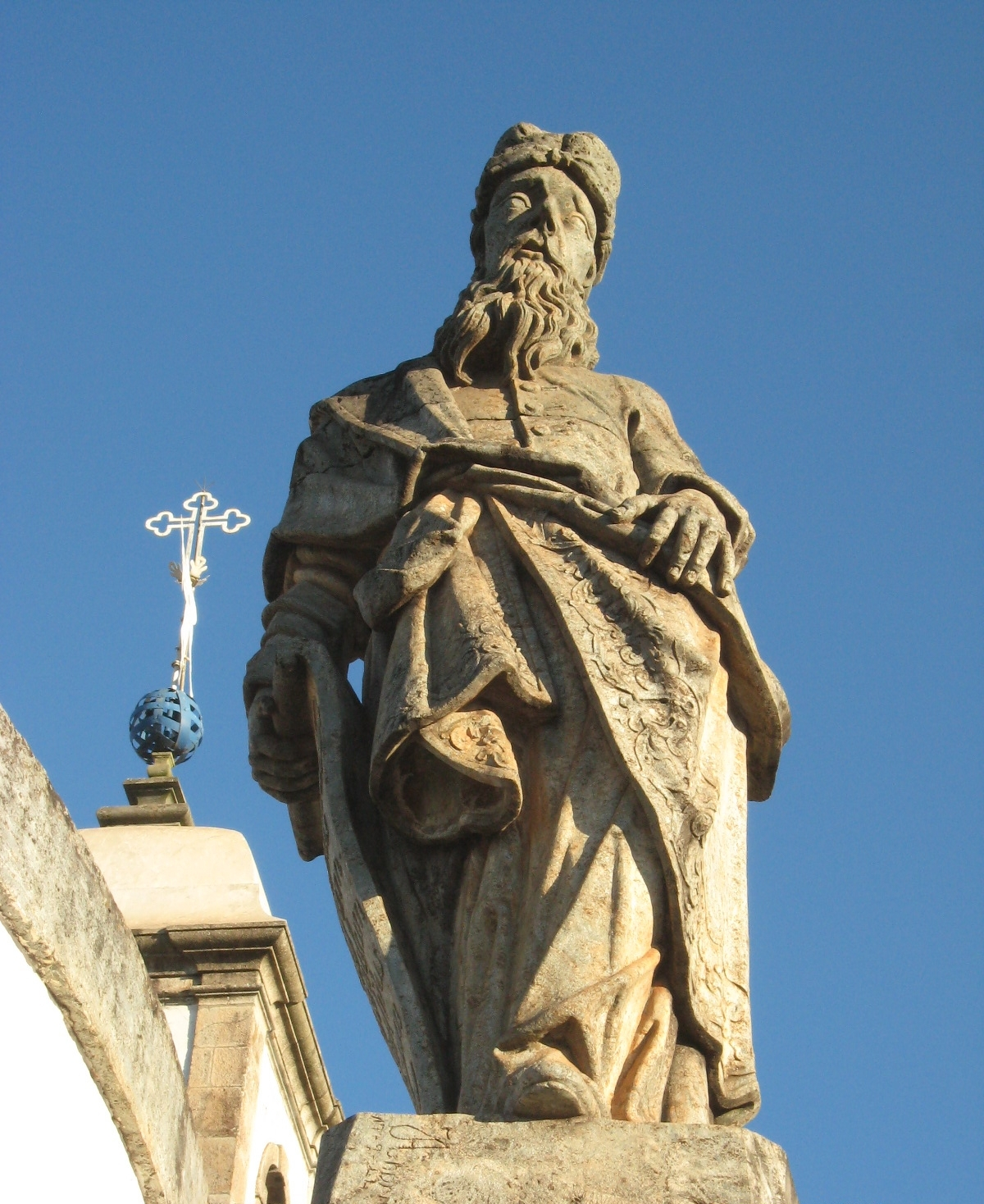
Nahum

=== Nahum ===
At the right edge of the forecourt, occupying the highest position atop the arc that joins the front and side exterior walls, is the statue of Nahum, the seventh of the minor prophets. The figure of Nahum is an old, bearded man with weathered face and tottering posture. He wears a long cassock, buttoned at the waist, whose folds are gathered in his left hand.

The finishing efforts of Aleijadinho's studio workers are highly evident in this piece, especially in the execution of the turban that Nahum wears on his head. Some details, such as the ornamental sash of the mantle, exhibit a general deficiency of articulation among the whole group, so that it seems possible Aleijadinho merely designed the initial features of the statue.

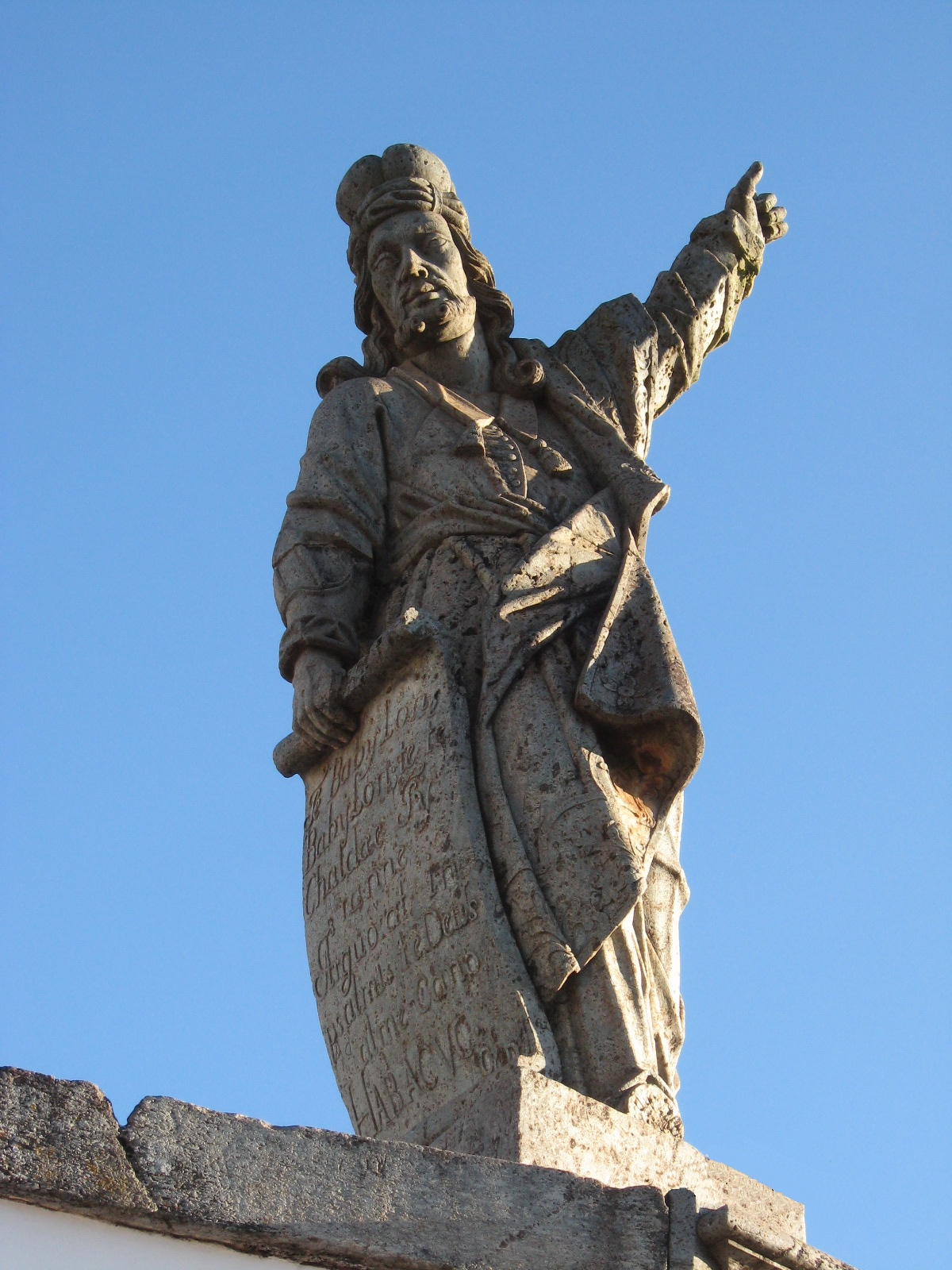
Habakkuk

=== Habakkuk ===
Habakkuk, the eighth of the minor prophets, closes the series of prophets in Congonhas. He holds a prominent position equivalent to that of Obadiah, at the lower point of the arc that joins the front and right side walls of the forecourt. With one arm raised, he condemns the oppressor.

Anew, he repeats the standard typology used previously for Jeremiah, Ezekiel, Hosea, Joel, and Jonah. Habakkuk's vestments include the same cassock worn by Nahum and Jonah, but this time with the addition of a collar whose corners are adorned with tassels. The prophet sports the most complicated headgear of the whole series, which has a high, flat top divided into four rounded sections, topped by a pendent tassel. The statue received special care in its execution from Aleijadinho because of to its location, with minimal collaboration evident from his studio.

== Political interpretations ==
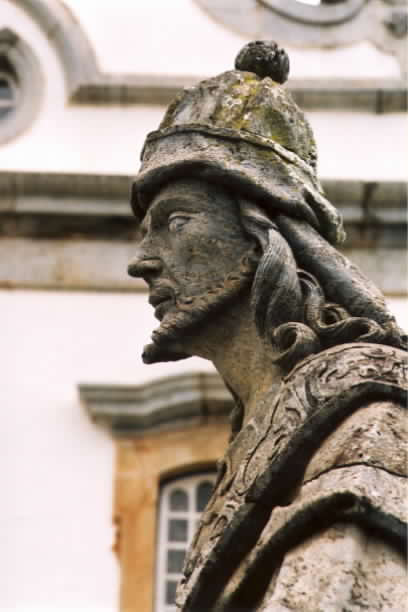
Detail of one of the prophets: Hosea

Some analysts have proposed that the prophets at Congonhas are a call for political freedom, both for the many African slaves who worked in the region's mines and for the native Brazilians who wanted independence from Portugal, as was reflected in the Inconfidência Mineira revolt a few years earlier.

== See also ==
- Brazilian sculpture
