= Zuccone =

Statue by Donatello

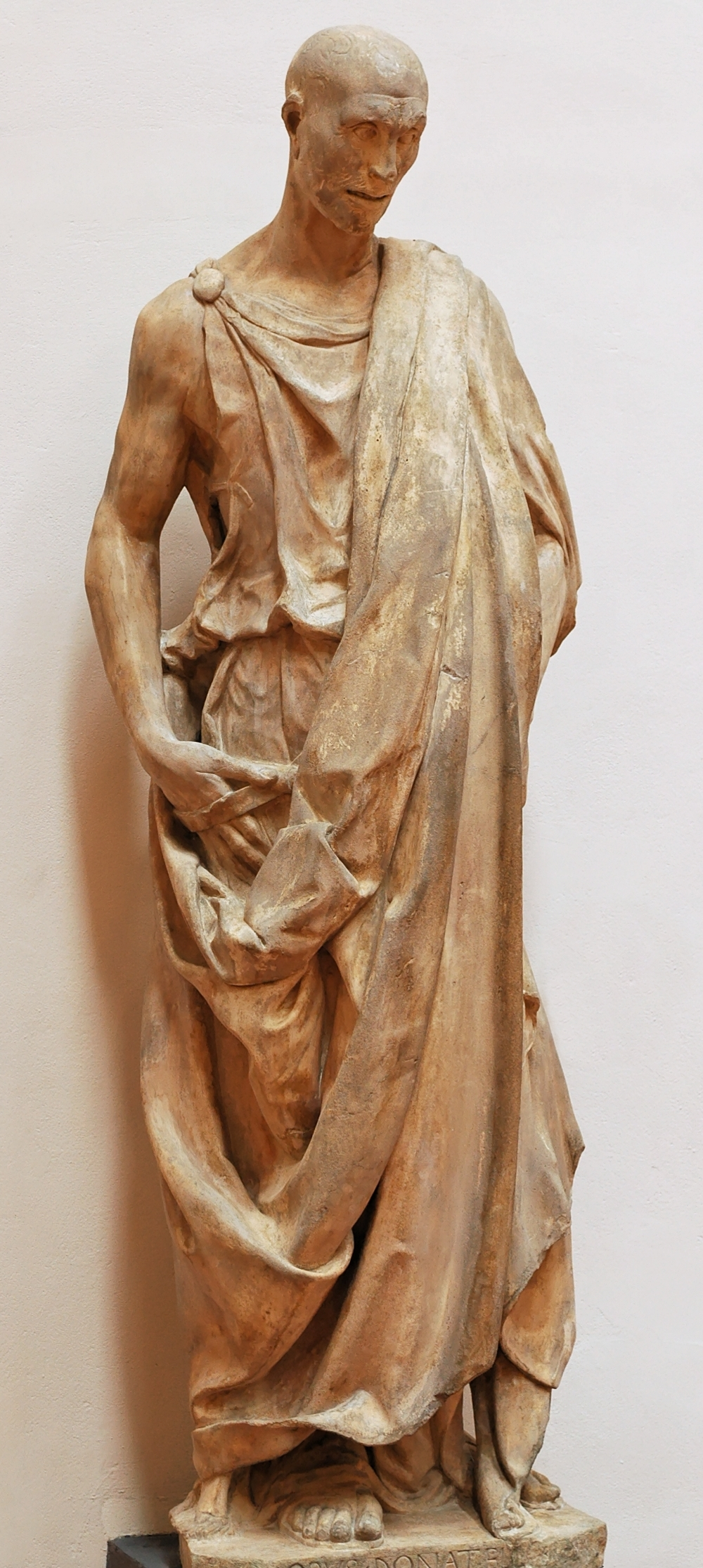
- Artist: Donatello
- Year: 1423–1425
- Type: Marble
- Location: Museo dell'Opera del Duomo (Florence), Florence

Lo Zuccone (Italian pronunciation: [lo dzukˈkoːne]; transl. the large head – transl. the bald head) is the popular name given to a marble statue by Donatello. It was commissioned for the bell tower of the Cathedral of Florence, Italy and completed between 1423 and 1425. It is also known as the Statue of the Prophet Habakkuk (Italian: Statua del Profeta Abacuc), as many believe it depicts the Old Testament prophet Habakkuk, though Vasari says that it is a portrait (in Biblical garb) of Giovanni di Barduccio Cherichini.

This statue is known for its realism and naturalism, which differed from most statuary commissioned at the time. Lo Zuccone is reported to have been Donatello's favorite, and he has been claimed to swear by the sculpture, "By the faith I place in my zuccone." Donatello is said to have shouted "speak, damn you, speak!" at the marble as he was carving it. It has been described as the most important marble sculpture of the fifteenth century. It is now in the Museo dell'Opera del Duomo in Florence.
