= Timothy Verdon =

Catholic priest and art historian (born 1946)

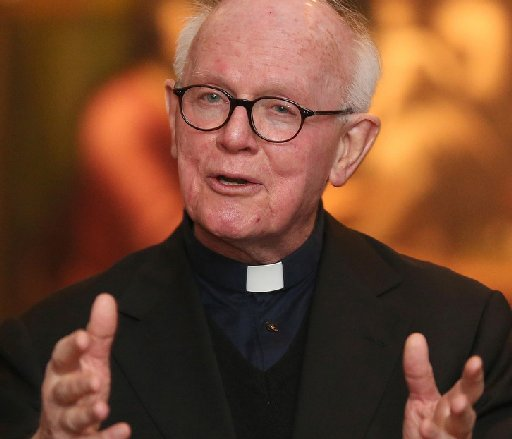

Personal details
- Born: April 24, 1946 (age 80) Hoboken, New Jersey, United States
- Education: M.A., M. Phil. – 1973, Ph.D. – 1975 Yale University B.A. – 1968 St. Peter's College
- Occupation: Art historian, museum director, author
- Known for: Art History

Timothy Christopher Verdon (born 24 April 1946), is a Roman Catholic priest and art historian, specialized in Christian sacred art on which he has written numerous books and articles. He has organized international scholarly conferences and curated exhibitions in Italy and the USA. He was born and raised in Hudson County, New Jersey, United States, and has lived in Italy for more than 50 years, now residing in Florence.

Verdon grew up in Weehawken, New Jersey, and attended St. Peter's Preparatory School as part of the class of 1964.

== Professional activity ==
Verdon is a Canon of Santa Maria del Fiore, Florence's Cathedral Church. He is Director of the Office of Sacred Art of the Archdiocese of Florence and of the Museo dell'Opera del Duomo (Cathedral Museum), whose new installation he designed in 2012–15 with the architects Adolfo Natalini, Marco Magni, and Piero Guicciardini.

He is the director of Centre for Ecumenism, Archdiocese of Florence and Academic Director of the Ecumenical Center for Art and Spirituality, Mount Tabor, Barga.

Verdon is an author in Italian and English of more than 100 books and articles on Christian Sacred Art and has been an Official Advisor to the Vatican Commission for Church Cultural Heritage. He has also been a Fellow of the Harvard University Center for Italian Renaissance Studies (Villa I Tatti)., and for 20 years has taught in the Florence Program of Stanford University.

From 2010 to 2015, he curated museum art exhibitions in Florence, Seoul, New York, Washington D.C., and Turin. He regularly contributes to the cultural page of L'Osservatore Romano.

== Academic career ==
After a year in Venice (1964–65), Verdon studied in Art History at St. Peter's College, New Jersey, with Sabine Spiero Gova, a former Bauhaus member and lecturer at the Ecole du Louvre. Then, following a semester in Paris and a second year in Venice as a Fulbright grant holder, he obtained a Ph.D. at Yale University, writing his dissertation on Italian Renaissance sculptor Guido Mazzoni under the direction of Charles Seymour, Jr., former head of the Renaissance sculpture department of the National Gallery of Art, Washington, D.C.

In 1976, Verdon entered a Benedictine priory, Mount Saviour Monastery, near Elmira, New York, later transferring to St. Anselm's Abbey, Washington, D.C., where he took courses in theology at the Catholic University of America. In 1980, with John Dally of Yale Divinity School, he organized a two-part conference for the 1500th anniversary of the birth of St. Benedict of Nursia, Monasticism and the Arts, promoted by the Yale Divinity School, the National Gallery of Art, Dumbarton Oaks, and the Catholic University.

Leaving monastic life, in 1985 Verdon, with John Henderson of Cambridge (later London University), organized a second two-part conference on religion and the arts, Christianity and the Renaissance, promoted by Florida State University together with the Harvard University Center for Italian Renaissance Studies (Villa Tatti) and the Istituto di Studi sul Rinascimento, Florence.

After teaching art history for American University programs in Florence, Verdon was ordained as a priest there in 1994, and in 1995 was invited by Archbishop (later Cardinal) Francesco Marchisano, Secretary of the Vatican Commission for the Conservation of the Church's Artistic and Historical Heritage, to serve as Consultor to the commission. In the same period, he authored a Pastoral Note on art and faith for the Tuscan Bishops' Conference: La vita si è fatta visible. L'arte e la comunicazione della fede.

Several years later Verdon was asked by the lay editor Arnoldo Mondadori to write a book on sacred art in Italy, and by another lay editor, Electa, to write on Mary in art, Maria nell'arte europea, followed by a book on Christ, Cristo nell'arte europea. Italy's main Catholic publisher, Le Edizioni Paoline, commissioned him to organize and edit three volumes on Christian art in Italy, the second of which, on the Renaissance, is entirely by Verdon, and for the National Bishops' Conference he wrote three volumes commenting on the readings of the Catholic liturgical cycle through traditional and contemporary Christian art. La bellezza nella parola.

These texts, which Interweave iconographical analysis, theology, and liturgical information, set a new benchmark for the interdisciplinary study of religion and culture, especially in the Renaissance, as do Verdon's four volumes on the scriptural sources of the Sistine Chapel frescoes, commissioned by Antonio Paolucci, then Director of the Vatican Museums, and published by the Vatican Museum Press. Verdon's volume on Beato Angelico, published in Italian by 24 Ore Cultura in 2015 and in English by Brepols in 2021 (Fra Angelico), similarly opens new methodological perspectives.

A member of the Florence Cathedral Foundation board of directors in 1997, when the Foundation or 'Opera di Santa Maria del Fiore' bought a former theatre adjacent to its museum in view of enlarging the latter, Verdon was asked to define the new structure's museological project, finally realized in 2012–2015. Since 2011, he has served as Museo dell'Opera del Duomo's director.

Timothy Verdon has given invited lectures at Florence University, Cambridge University, Oxford University, Yale University, Stanford University, Palo Alto, CA, the Gregorian University, Rome, the Vatican Museums, the Courtauld Institute of Art, the Metropolitan Museum of Art, the National Gallery of Art, London, the National Gallery of Art, Washington, D. C., and the Collège de France, the Louvre.

In 2016, he was keynote speaker at the United Nations World Tourism Organization Conference on Religious Tourism, Utrecht.

== Books ==
- The Art of Guido Mazzoni, Garland Press, New York 1978
- Le chiese di Firenze, con A. Coppellotti e P. Fabbri, Arsenale, Venezia 1999
- Arte, fede, storia. Guida alla Firenze cristiana, Firenze, Studio Editoriale Fiorentino, 1999
- Il Duomo di Firenze e la sua Piazza, CD ROM interattivo, Arcidiocesi di Firenze e IMT Milano, 2000
- Firenze scomparsa. La città delle torri e l'antico centro religioso. Testo per videocassetta. Firenze, Vallecchi Multimedia. 2001
- L'Arte Sacra in Italia. L'immaginazione religiosa dal paleocristiano al postmoderno. Milano, A. Mondadori, 2001
- Maria nell'arte fiorentina, Mandragora, Firenze 2002
- Arte e catechesi. La valorizzazione dei beni culturali in senso cristiano, EDB, Bologna 2002
- Vedere il mistero. Il genio artistico della liturgia cattolica, A. Mondadori, Milano, 2003
- Maria nell'arte europea, Electa, Milano, 2004 (also published as Mary in Western Art, Pope John Paul II)
- Firenze, Museo dell'Opera di Santa Maria del Fiore, Electa/Sole 24 Ore, Milano 2005
- Cristo nell'arte europea, Electa, Milano 2005
- Le Christ dans l'art européen, Citadelles & Mazenod, Paris 2008
- La Basilica di San Pietro. I Papi e gli artisti. A. Mondadori, Milano 2005
- Michelangelo Teologo. Ancora, Milano 2005
- Bellezzza e identità. L'Europa e le sue cattedrali, FMR, Bologna 2006
- L'Arte cristiana in Italia. 3 voll., Edizioni San Paolo, Cinisello Balsamo (Milano) 2005- 2009
- La Bellezza nella Parola. L'arte a commento delle letture festive, 3 voll. Edizioni San Paolo, Cinisello Balsamo (Milano), 2007-2009
- Attraverso il velo. Come leggere un'immagine sacra, Ancora, Milano 2007
- Il catechismo della carne. Corporeità e arte cristiana, Cantagalli, Siena 2009
- L'arte nella vita della Chiesa, Libreria Editrice Vaticana, Vaticano 2009
- Arte della preghiera, Libreria Editrice Vaticana, Vaticano 2010
- Ecclesia. Le chiese d'Italia nella vita del popolo, UTET, Torino 2010
- Caravaggio e l'avventura della fede (con Antonio Paolucci), Edizioni Musei Vaticani, Vaticano 2011
- The Story of St. Francis of Assisi in Twenty-Eight Scenes, Paraclete Press, Brewster, Mass., 2015
- Breve storia dell'arte sacra cristiana, Queriniana, Brescia 2012
- Beato Angelico, Sole24ore, Milano 2015 (in francese: Fra Angelico, Imprimerie Nationale [Actes Sud, Arles], 2015)
- Il Nuovo Museo dell'Opera del Duomo, Mandragora, Firenze 2015-12-09
- La Cappella Sistina, cuore e simbolo della Chiesa (4 volumi: 1. Lo scrigno del Papa; 2. Gli affreschi del Quattrocento; 3. La volta della Sistina; 4. Il Giudizio universale), Edizioni Musei Vaticani e Libreria Editrice Vaticana, atteso nel 2016
- Fra Angelico: Painter, Friar, Mystic, by Timothy Verdon
- The Story of St. Francis of Assisi by Timothy Verdon
- Art And Prayer by Timothy Verdon
- Vedere il mistero. Il genio artistico della liturgia cattolica di Timothy Verdon edito da Mondadori, 2003

== Notable articles ==
- Museums change lives, in T. Verdon, R. Filardi, eds., Museology and Values. Art and human Dignity in the 21st Century, Turnhout, Brepols 2019, pp. 23–31
- "Urbs Beata. Riflessioni sulla città ideale rinascimentale", in M. Sladek, ed., Oestliches-Westliches: Studien zur vergleichenden Geistes- und Religiongeschichte, Heidelberg 1995, pp. 321–36
- "Donatello and the Theatre: Stage Space and Projected Space in the San Lorenzo Pulpits", in Artibus et Historiae 14 (1986), pp. 29–55
- "Bramante and Early Christian Spatial Articulation", in Arte lombarda 86/87 (1988)
- "Potere e misericordia. Il Giona della volta sistina", in M. Caemerer, Kunst der Cinquecento in der Toscana, Munich 1992, pp. 43–56
- "La teologia della Stanza della Segnatura", in Arte Cristiana 86 (1998), pp. 241–52 and 321-33
- "The Spiritual World of Piero della Francesca", in J.M. Wood, ed. Cambridge Companion to Piero della Francesca, New York 2001
- Masaccio's Trinity: Theologlical, Social and Civic meanings, in D. Cole Ahl, ed., Cambridge Companion to Masaccio, Cambridge University Press 2002
- Michelangelo and the Body of christ. Religious Meaning in the Florence Pietà, in J. Wasserman, ed., Michelangelo's Florence Pietà, Princeton University Press 2002
- "Pagans in the Church", in M. Hall, ed., Cambridge Companion to Raphael. Cambridge University Press 2005
- "Il corpo, il volto, la persona di Gesù", in T. Verdon, ed., Gesù: il corpo, il volto nell'arte (catalogue of the exhibition at Venaria Reale, Turin), Milan 2010, 19-69
- The Infancy, Passion and Resurrection of Christ in Michelangelo, in M. Wivel, ed., Michelangelo and Sebastiano, catalogue of the exhibition at the National Gallery, London, National Gallery company and Yale Press 2017
- 'Omnia Vanitas': Art, Illusion and Truth, in C. Ricasoli, ed. The living dead. Ecclesiastes Thriough Art, catalogue of the exhibition at the Museum of the Bible, 2017–2018, Ferdinand Schoeninigh, Paderborn

== Books edited ==
- Monasticism and the Arts, Syracuse University Press, New York 1984
- Christianity and the Renaissance, Syracuse University Press, New York 1990
- L'Arte e la Bibbia, Giuntina, Firenze 1991
- Alla Riscoperta di Piazza del Duomo in Firenze, voll. 1–7, Centro Di, Firenze 1992-1998
- L'Uomo in cielo. Il ciclo pittorico della cupola di Santa Maria del Fiore: teologia ed iconografia a confronto, n° speciale della rivista Vivens homo, Dehoniane, Bologna 1996; 3
- Sotto il cielo della cupola: il coro di Santa Maria del Fiore dal rinascimento al 2000 Catalogo della mostra di Palazzo Vecchio, Electa, Milano 1996
- Lo Spazio del Sacro: luoghi e spostamenti, n° speciale della rivista Vivens homo, Dehoniane, Bologna 1997
- Pellegrinaggio, Monachesimo, Arte. La visibilità del cammino interiore, Firenze, Polistampa 2000
- Atti dei convegni del Settimo Centenario di Santa Maria del Fiore, 3 voll. (5 tomi), Firenze, Edifir, 2000
- Alla Riscoperta delle Chiese di Firenze, Voll. I-II-III -IV, Firenze, Centro Di, 2002 – 2005
- Arte e catechesi. La valorizzazione dei beni culturali in senso cristiano, Dehoniane, Bologna 2002
- Di fronte all'Altissimo. La cappella di Mario Botta e Giuliano Vangi ad Azzano di Seravezza. Electa, Milano 2005
- Bellezza e vita. La spiritualità nell'arte contemporanea. Edizioni San Paolo 2011

== Exhibitions ==
- History and iconography of the Gates of Paradise Nelson Atkins Museum Of Art - Kansas City, MO. USA
- Monastic Themes in Renaissance Art (A Walking Tour of Italian Painting and Sculpture in the National Gallery of Art), Washington, D.C. 1980
- Il Nuovo Museo dell' Operal del Duomo
- Michelangelo & Sebastiano (London: National Gallery, 15 March–25 June 2017). Accompanying book by Matthias Wivel
- Visions of Faith (with Anthony F. Janson), The John and Mable Ringling Museum of Art, Sarasota, Florida 1985
- Sotto il cielo della cupola. Il coro di Santa Maria del Fiore dal Rinascimento al 2000, Florence, Palazzo Vecchio, 18 June – 21 September 1997
- Gesù. Il corpo, il volto nell'arte. Turin, Reggia di Venaria Reale, 1 April-1 August 2010
- The Beauty of Christianity, Seoul, National Palace Museum, 12 August – 12 November 2014
- Picturing Mary. Woman, Mother, Idea, Washington, D.C., National Museum of Women in the Arts, 5 December 2014 – 12 April 2015
- Sculpture in the Age of Donatello. Renaissance Masterpieces from Florence Cathedral (with Daniel Zolli), February 20-June 14, 2015
- Si fece carne. L'arte contemporanea e il sacro (with Federica Chezzi). Florence, Basilica di San Lorenzo, 9 October 2015 – 9 January 2016
- Sculpture in the Age of Donatello 2015 New York City, Museum of Biblical Art
- Jesus: His Body and Face in Art 2010 Reggia di Venaria Reale, Turin

== See also ==
- Florence Cathedral
- Museo dell'Opera del Duomo (Florence)
- Roman Catholic Archdiocese of Florence
