= Kadarim =

Place in northern Israel

Kadarim: קַדָּרִים (Hebrew)
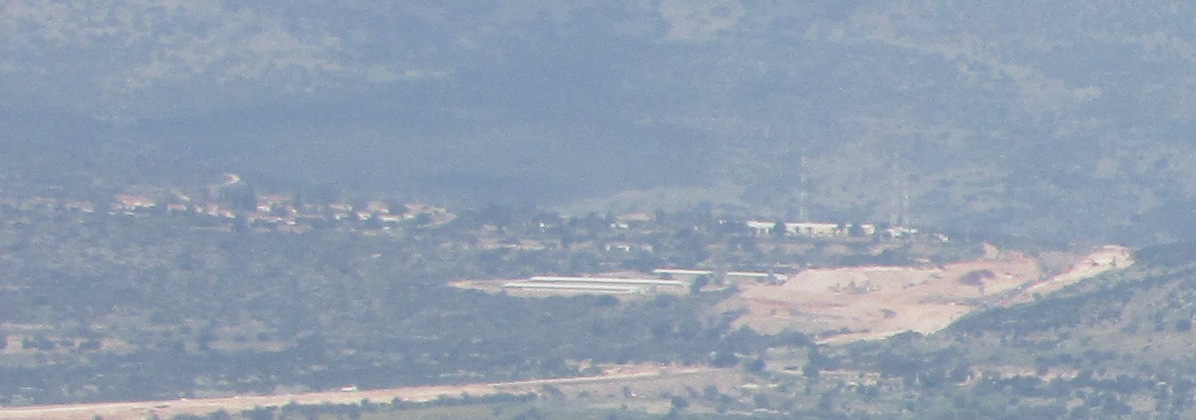
- Etymology: 'Potters'
- Location within Northeast Israel Location within Israel
- Coordinates: 32°53′54″N 35°28′27″E
- Country: Israel
- District: Northern
- Subdistrict: Safed
- Council: Upper Galilee
- Affiliation: Kibbutz Movement
- Founded: 1980
- Population (2024): 325

Kadarim (Hebrew: קַדָּרִים, lit. 'Potters') is a kibbutz in northern Israel. Located near Maghar, it falls under the jurisdiction of Upper Galilee Regional Council. In 2024 it had a population of 325.

== History ==
The village was established in 1980 near Mount Kadarim, which was named after the potters of the village of Hananiah, famous for its pottery during the time of the Talmud and the Mishnah. Due to its proximity to a quarry at its initial site, the kibbutz was moved to its current location in 1987.

Some believe that Habakkuk is buried near Kadarim, though others put his burial place near Hokuk or at Toyserkan in Iran.
