= Museo dell'Opera del Duomo (Florence) =

Art museum in Florence, Italy

Coordinates: 43°46′20.4″N 11°15′22.40″E

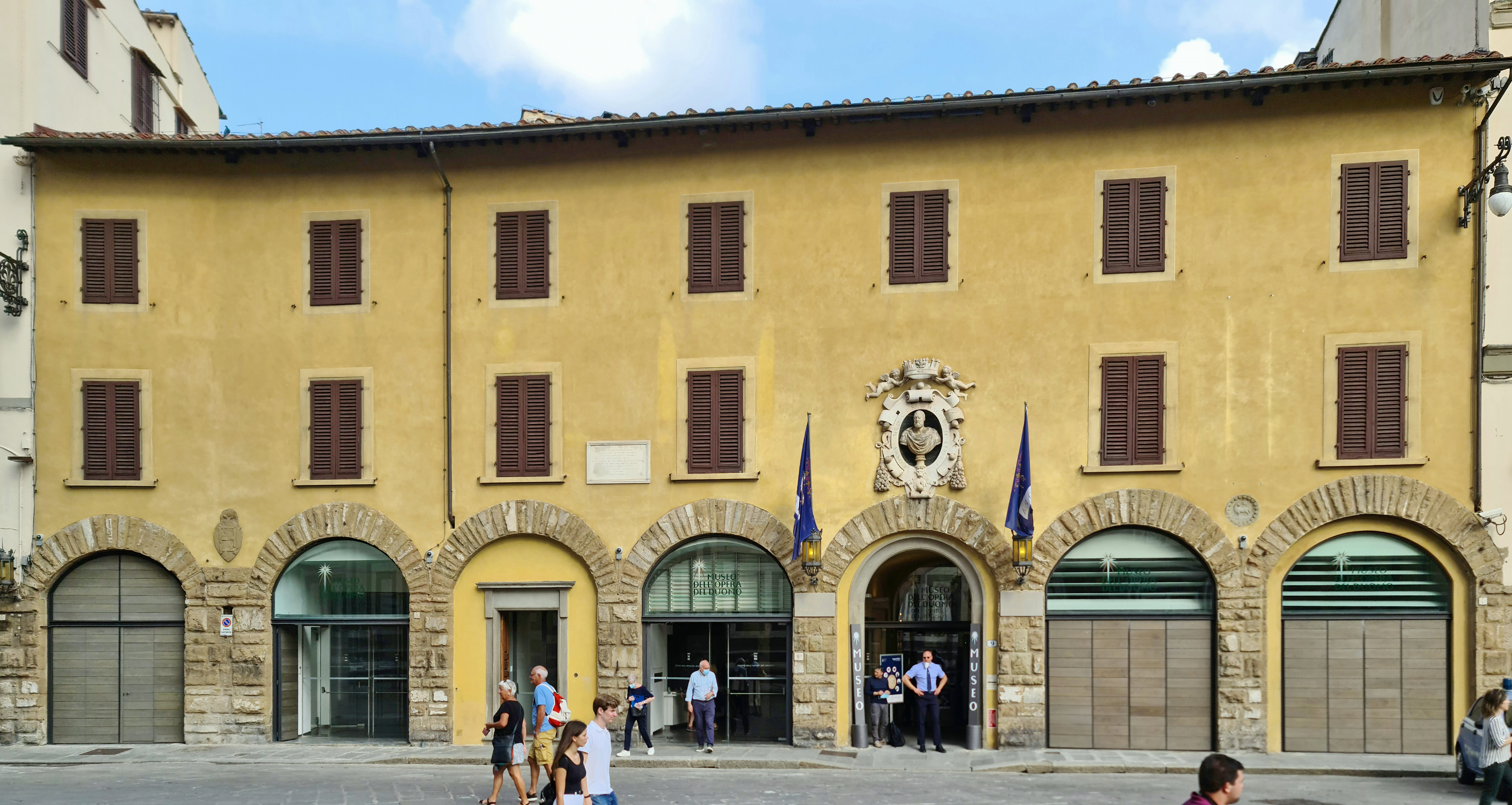
- The museum, seen from the Piazza del Duomo
- Established: 1891
- Location: Piazza del Duomo 9, Florence, Italy
- Director: Timothy Verdon (since 2011)

The Museo dell'Opera del Duomo (Museum of the Works of the Cathedral) in Florence, Italy is a museum containing many of the original works of art created for Florence Cathedral, including the adjacent Florence Baptistery and Giotto's campanile. Most of the exterior sculptures have been removed from these buildings, usually replaced by replica pieces, with the museum conserving the originals.

The museum is located opposite the east end of the Duomo, with its trilobate apse. It occupies the area of the original cathedral works where much of the sculpture it houses was originally carved, as well as pieces such as Michelangelo's David, which was initially commissioned by the cathedral works as a buttress figure, but was installed in front of the Palazzo della Signoria (now in the Galleria dell'Accademia). It opened as a museum in 1891, and now houses what has been called "one of the world's most important collections of sculpture."

Between 2009 and 2015 the museum considerably expanded, taking over the adjacent old Teatro Nuovo ("new theatre") building. This allowed the construction of large display frameworks copying the outline of the old façade of the cathedral, into which the museum's originals are placed at their appropriate positions.

As of April 2023, the director of the museum is Fr. Timothy Verdon, an American priest who has held the position since 2011.

== Collection ==
=== Sculpture ===
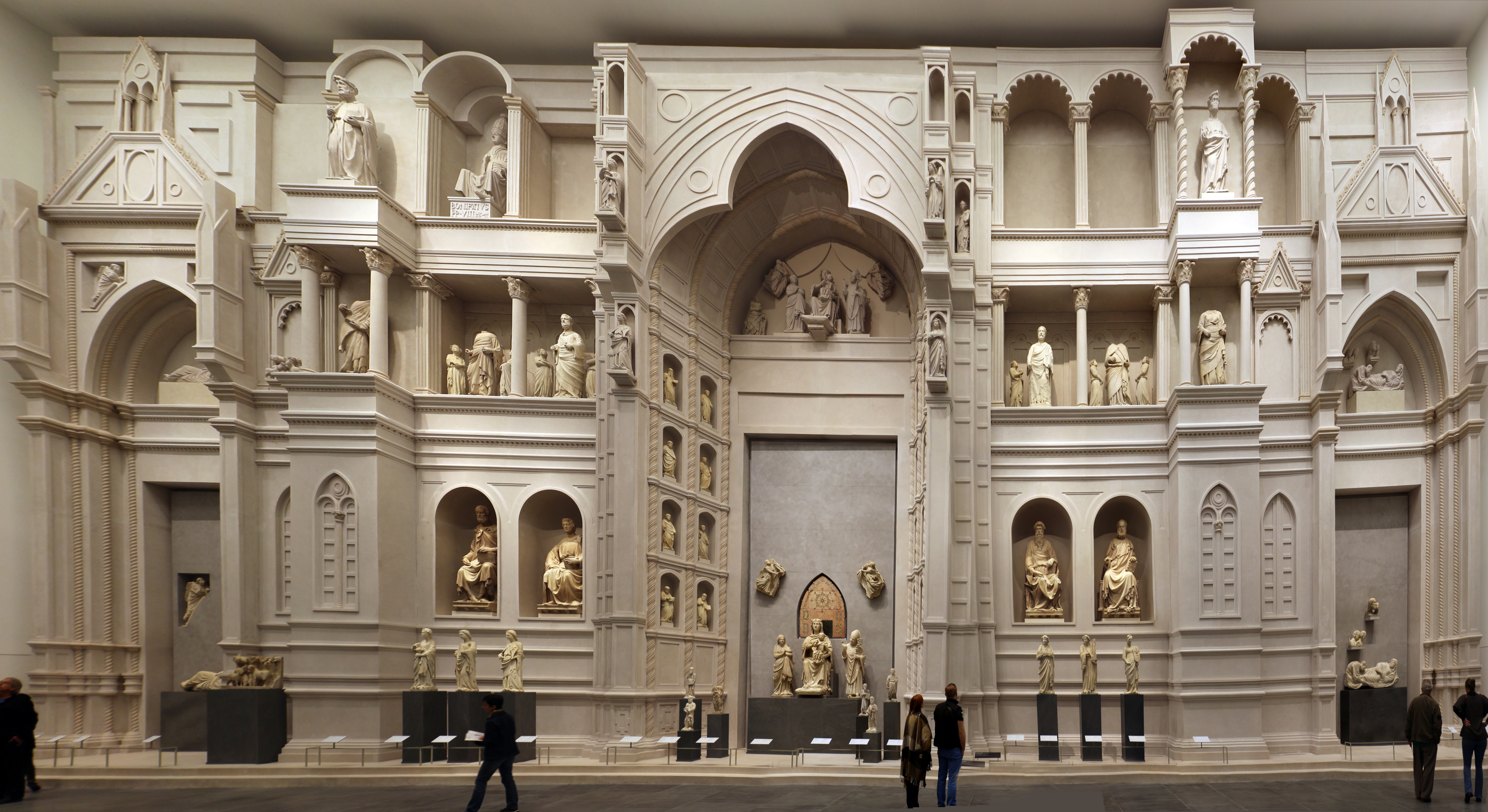
Display of the cathedral facade, with original sculptures

The cathedral museum holds the originals of important 14th and early 15th-century sculptures for its exterior façade, portals, the campanile and the Baptistry, including works by Arnolfo di Cambio, Lorenzo Ghiberti, Niccolò di Piero Lamberti, Nanni di Banco, Donatello, and others.

Among the holdings are all three of the original bronze doors for the Baptistery of Florence Cathedral by Andrea Pisano and Lorenzo Ghiberti, the two cantorias, or singing-galleries, designed for the cathedral, one each by Luca della Robbia and Donatello. All these have been replaced by replicas at the cathedral.

The collection also includes Donatello's painted and gilded wood Penitent Magdalene from the Baptistry, and The Deposition, a pietà sculpted by Michelangelo which he intended for his own tomb.

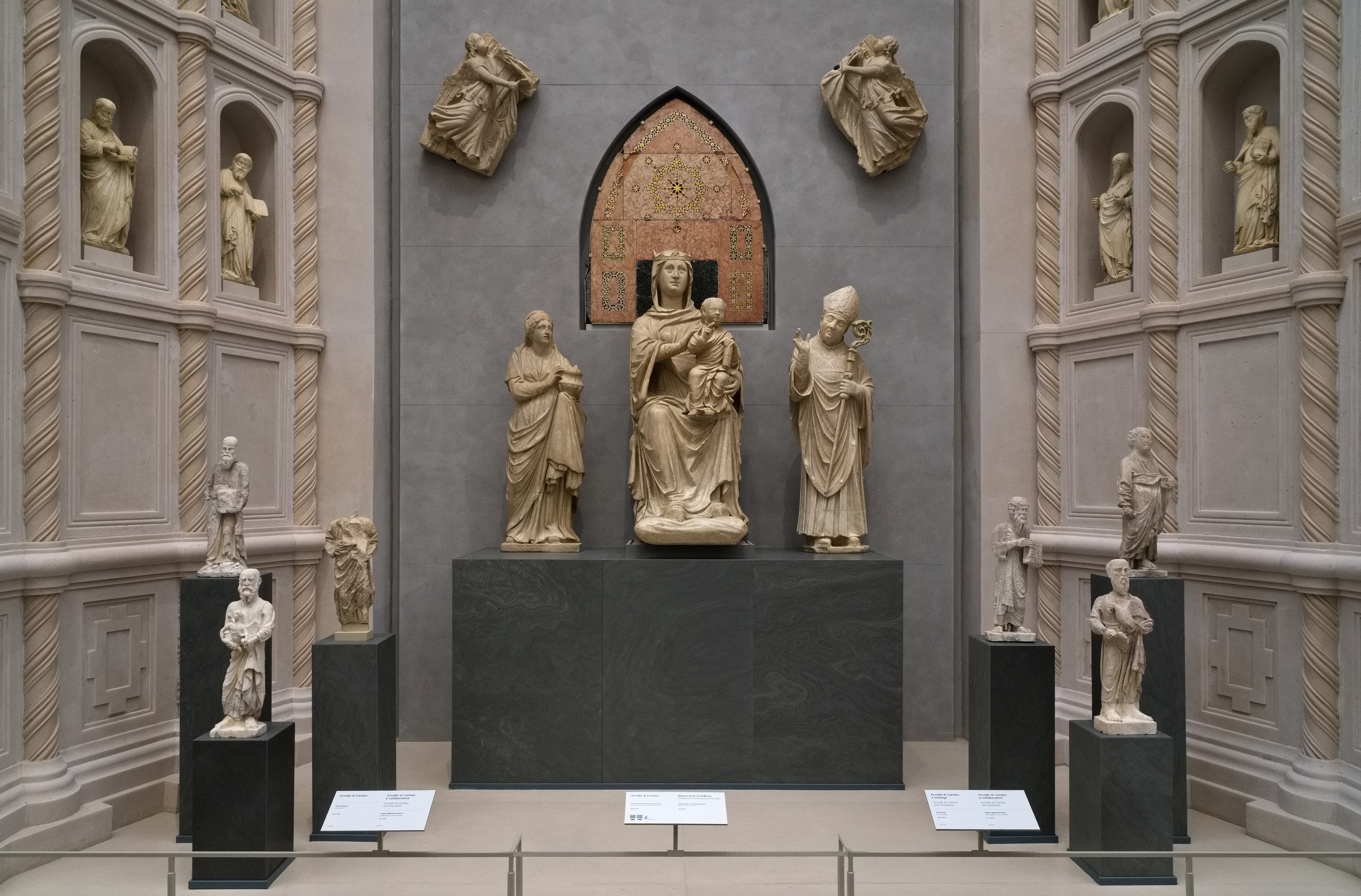
The original figures of the main portal, grouped around the Madonna with the Glass Eyes between Saints Reparata and Zanobi, 1300–1310

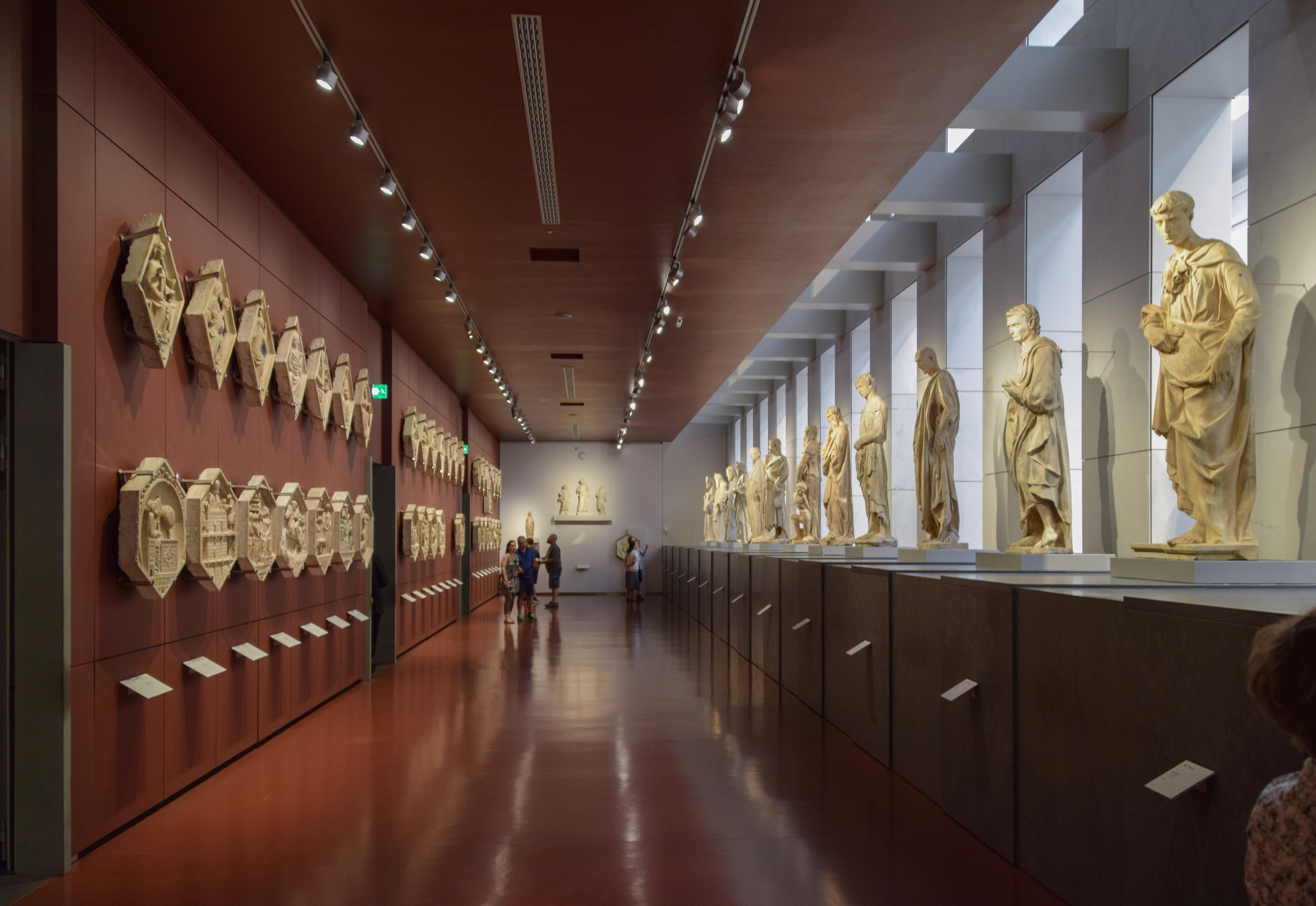
Upper floor with the originals of the sculptural program of the campanile

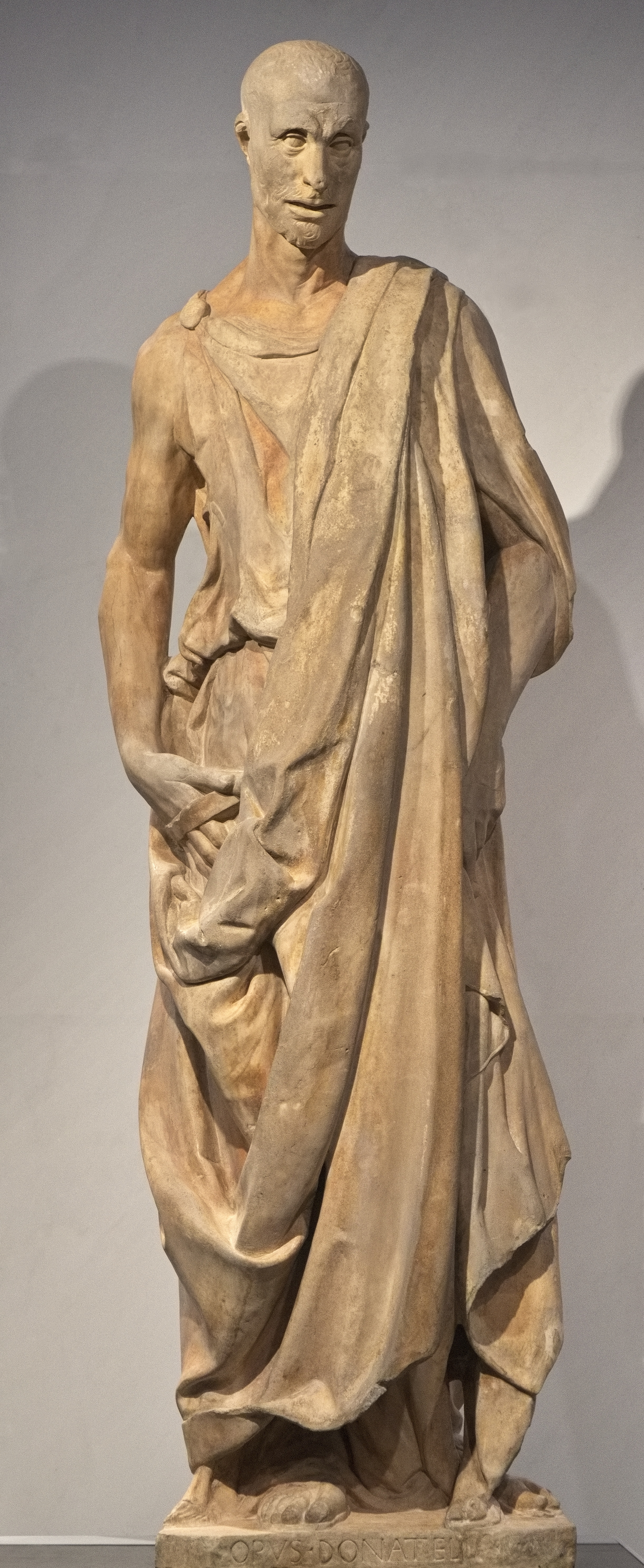
The Zuccone by Donatello from the Campanile

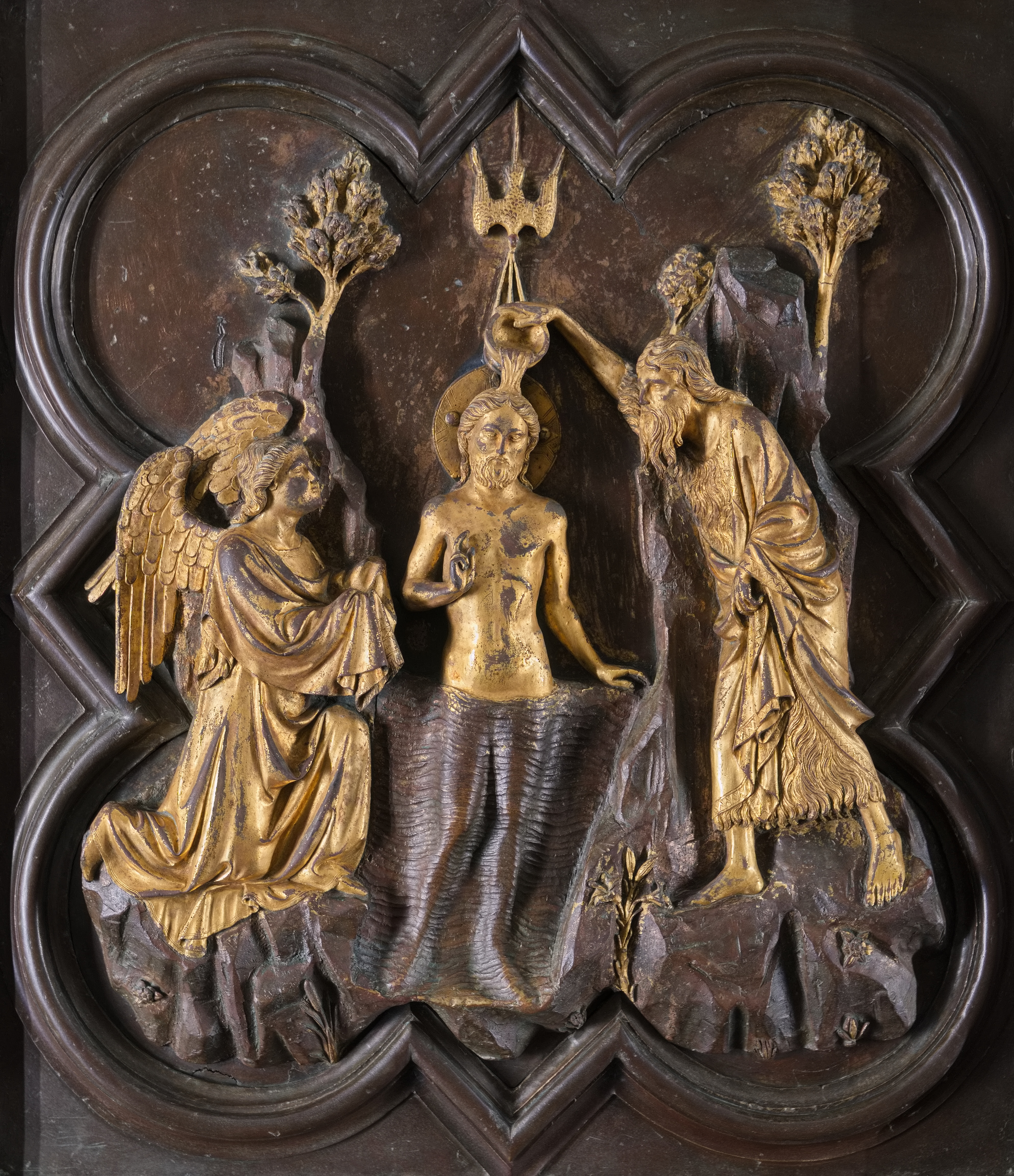
The Baptism of Christ, from Andrea Pisano's south portal of the Baptistery

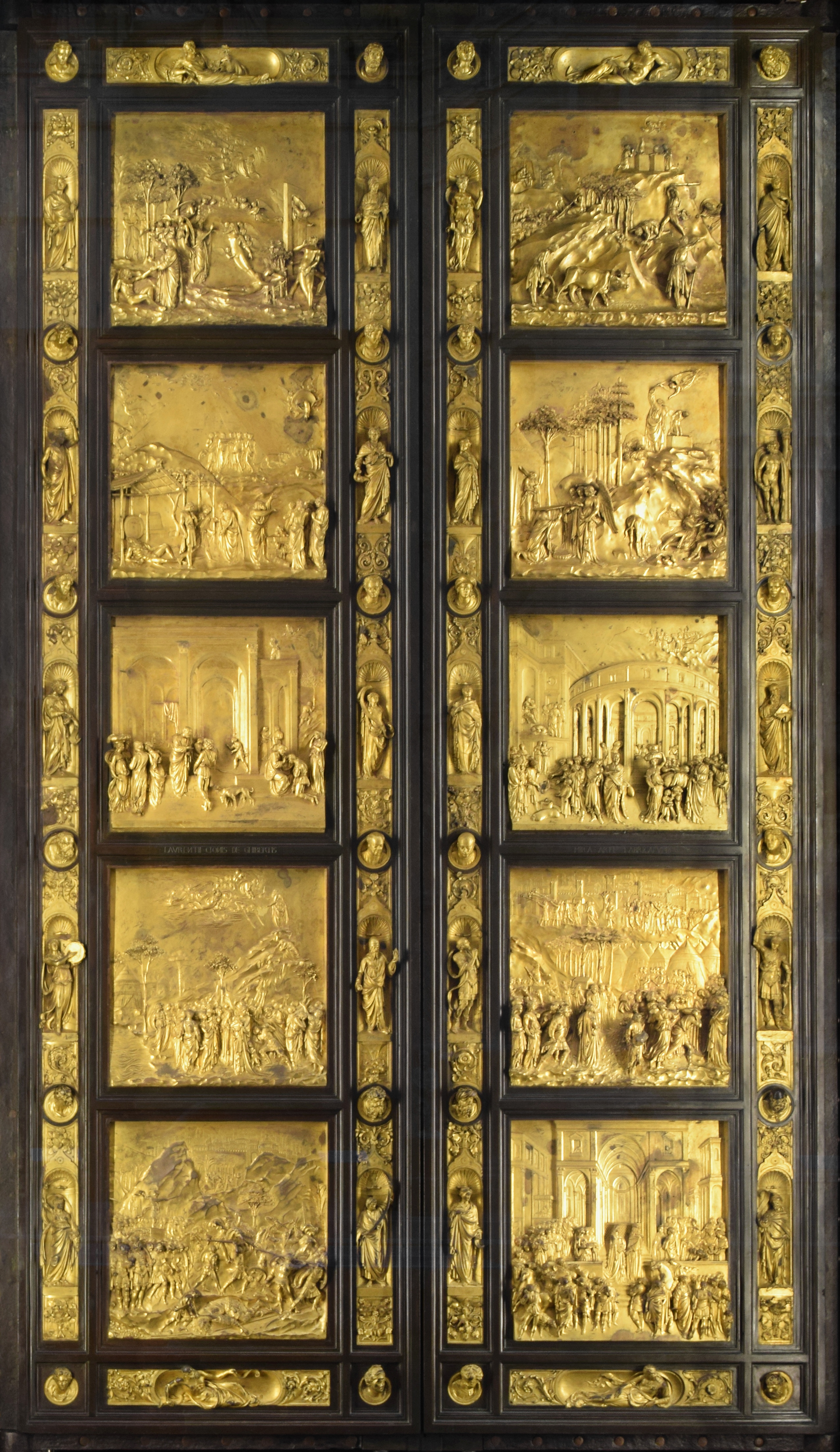
The Gates of Paradise from the Baptistry by Ghiberti

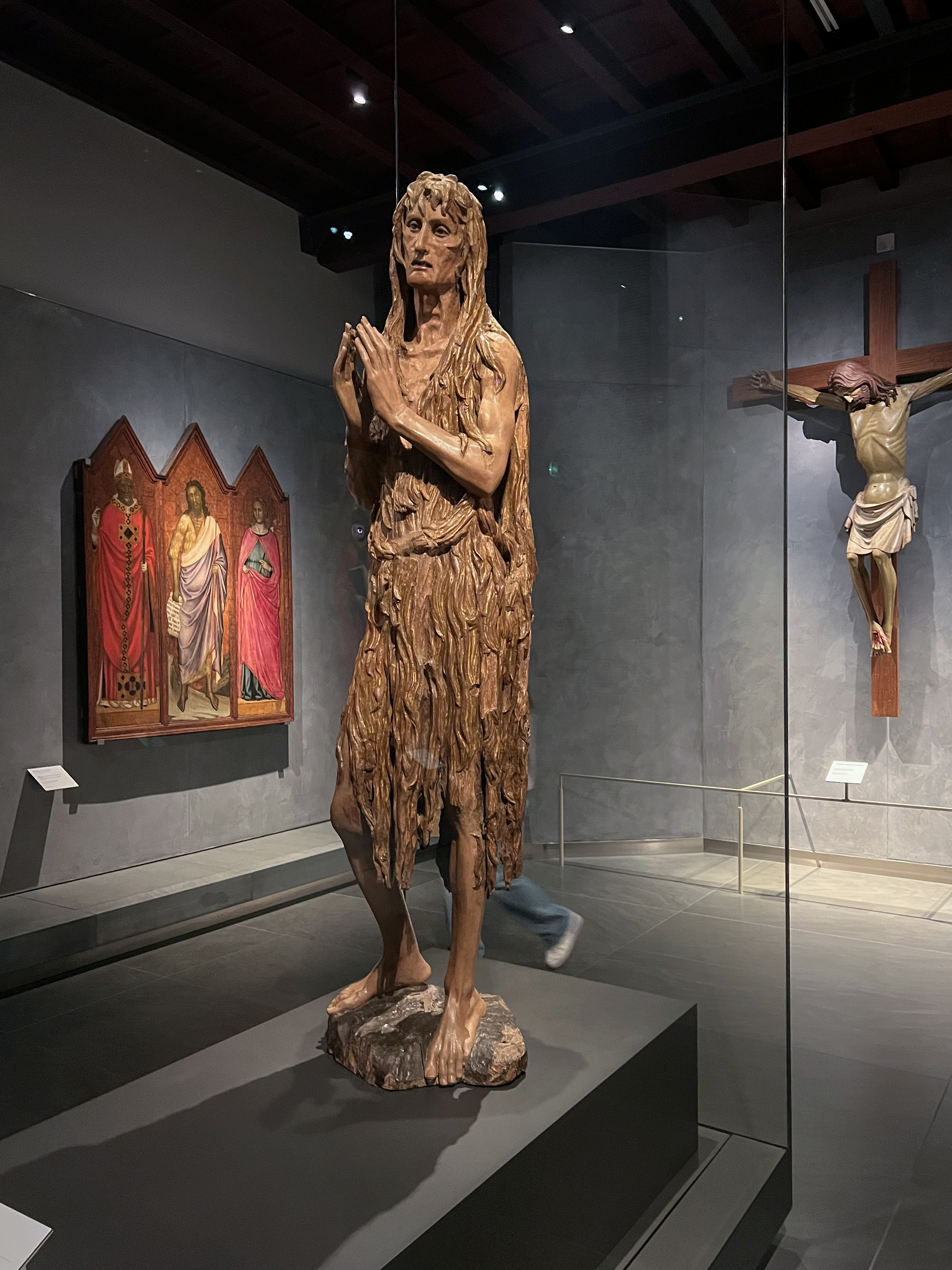
Donatello's Penitent Magdalene, painted and gilded wood, formerly in the Baptistry

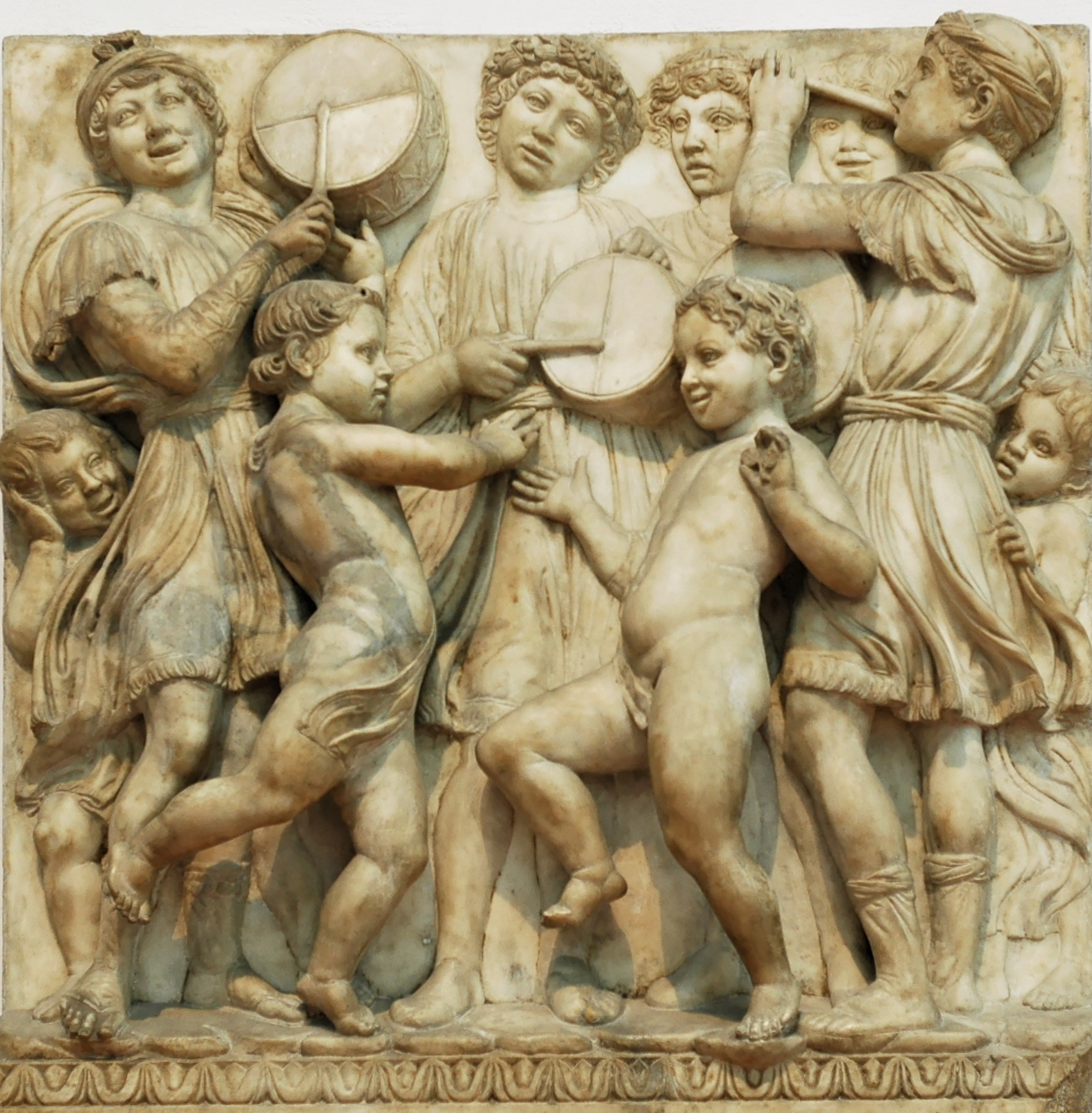
One of Luca della Robbia's cantoria reliefs

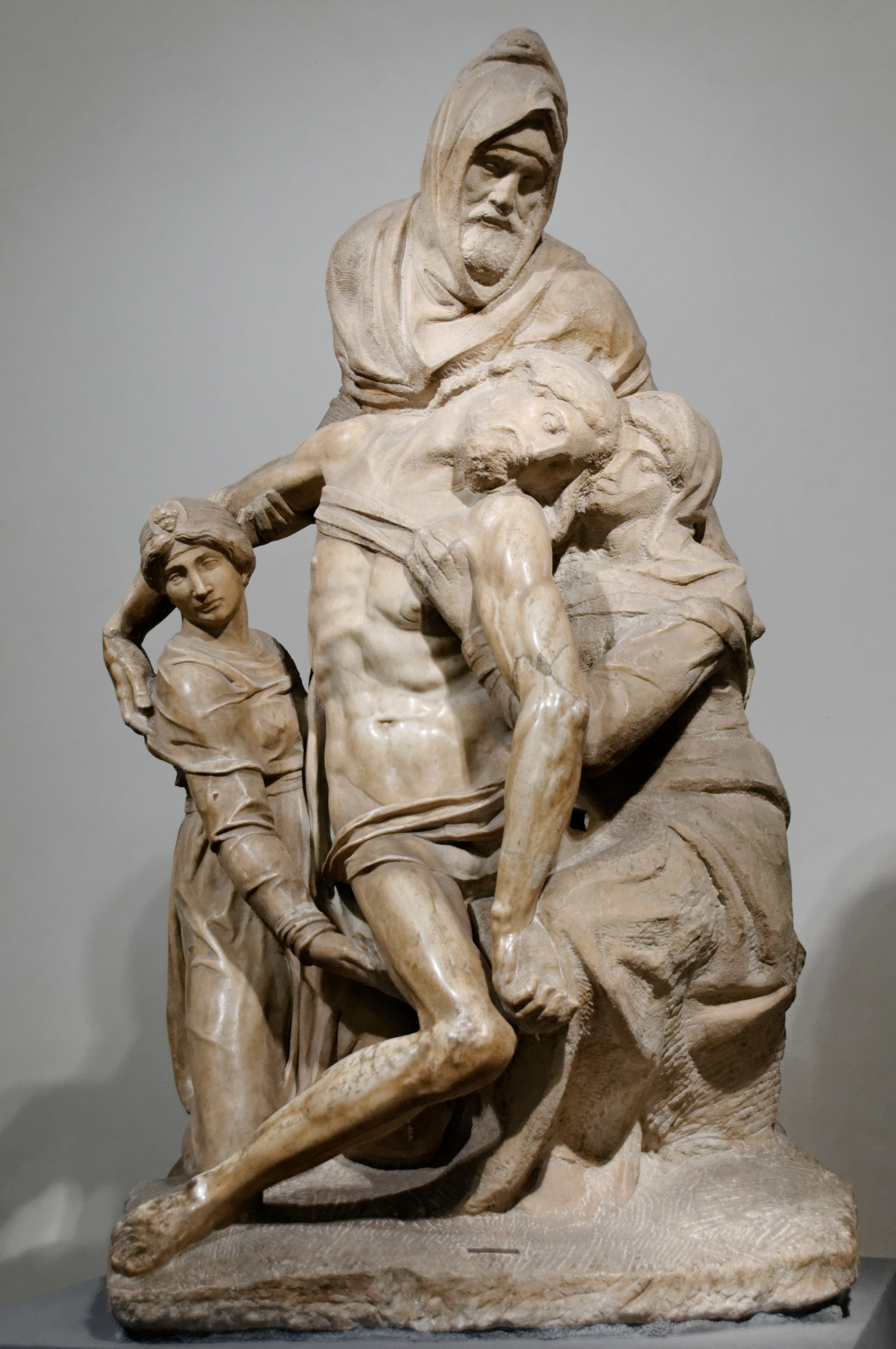
The Deposition by Michelangelo (1547–1555)

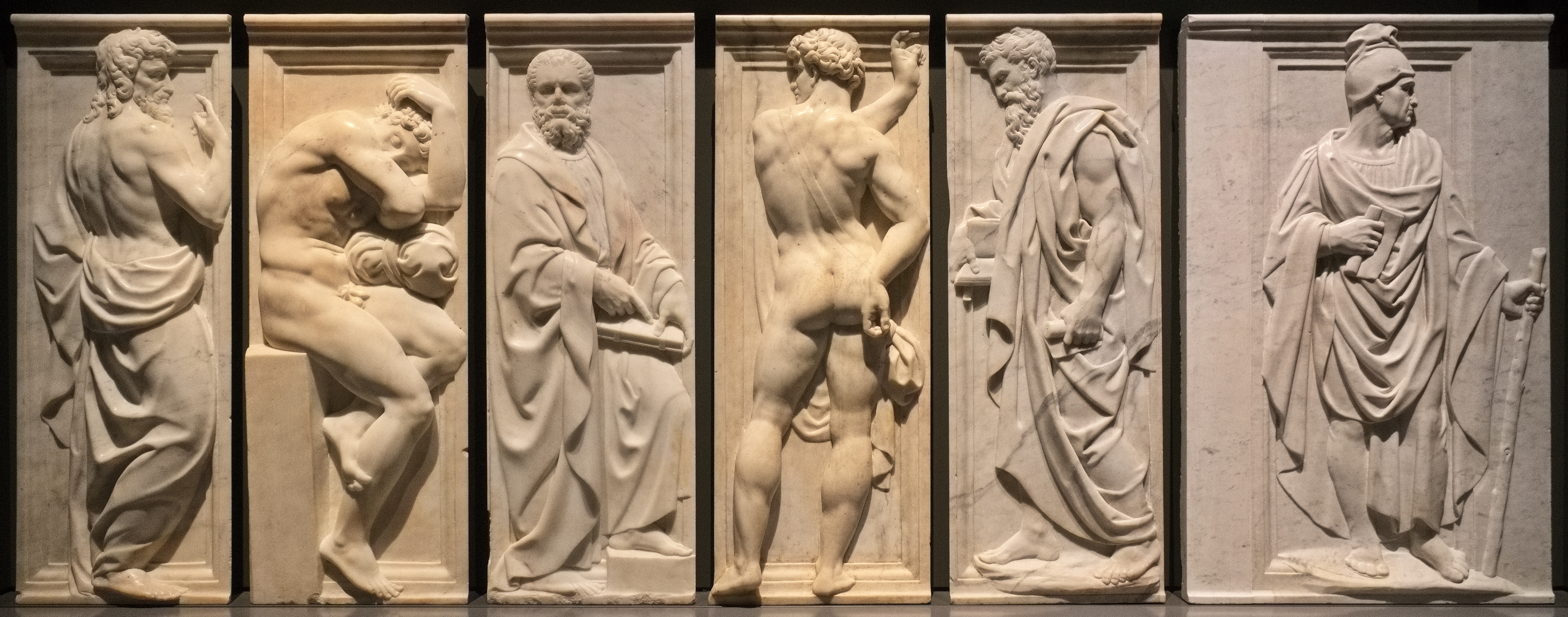
Baccio Bandinelli a. o., 6 of 24 reliefs from the choir of Santa Maria del Fiore (1547–1572)

=== Other ===
The museum also has significant collections of paintings (mostly late medieval and Early Renaissance), illuminated manuscripts, drawings, textiles in the form of vestments, metalwork and church plate, micromosaics, reliquaries, and musical instruments.

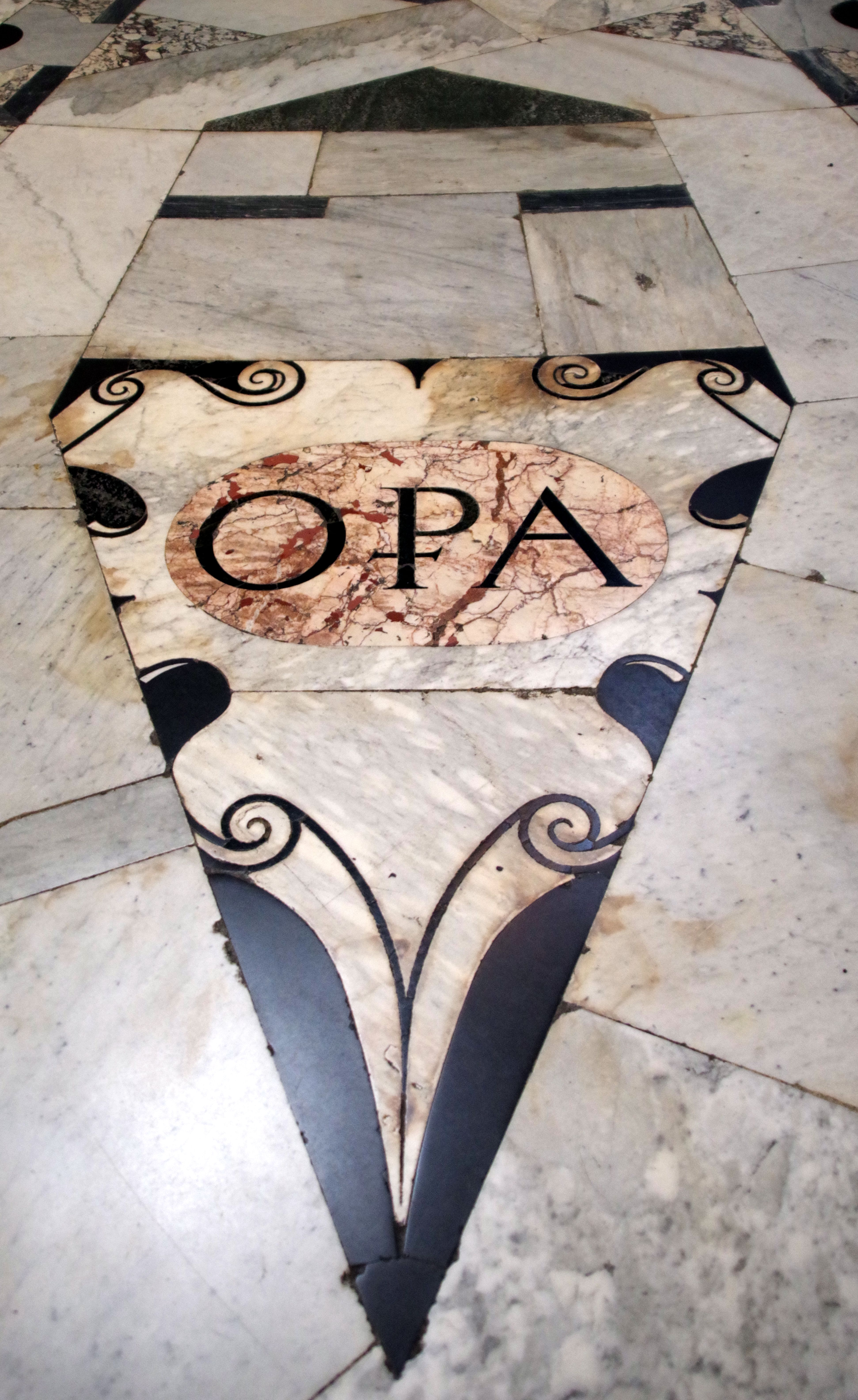
The logo of the cathedral works, the Opera del Duomo, inlaid in the floor of the cathedral
