= Seven Wonders of Portuguese Origin in the World =

The Seven Wonders of Portuguese Origin in the World are a list of seven significant landmarks across the world which were built by the Portuguese during the six centuries of the Portuguese Empire (1415-1999). The competition was held in conjunction with the Ministry of Culture of Portugal and the Portuguese Institute for Architectural Heritage.

The objective of the list and competition was to promote the architectural heritage and legacy of the Portuguese across the world. A commission pre-selected 27 notable monuments of Portuguese origin from 16 countries across Asia, Africa, and the Americas. The results of the competition were announced at a ceremony at the Portugal Day celebrations in 2010.

== Seven Wonders ==
| Image | Wonder | Location | Note |
|---|---|---|---|
| | Ruins of São Paulo Church & College | Macau | Built 1602-1640. |
| | Fortress of Diu | Diu, India | Built 1534-1546. |
| | Church & Convent of São Francisco | Salvador, Brazil | Built 1686-1755. |
| | Fortress of Mazagão | El Jadida, Morocco | Built 1541-1542. |
| | Basilica of Bom Jesus | Goa, India | Built 1594-1605. |
| | Church of São Francisco de Assis | Ouro Preto, Brazil | Built 1766-1794. |
| | Cidade Velha | Santiago, Cabo Verde | Built 1460-1593. |

=== Map ===
Seven Wonders of Portuguese Origin in the World

== Finalists ==
The 20 finalists for the competition were:

| Image | Finalist | Location | Note |
|---|---|---|---|
| | Cathedral of Santa Catarina | Goa, India | Built 1562-1640. |
| | Island of Moçambique | Nampula, Mozambique | Built 1507-1970 |
| | Fortifications of Muscat | Muscat, Oman | Built 1522-1560. |
| | Ruins of Gorgora Nova | Gorgora, Ethiopia | Built 1611-1618. |
| | Sanctuary of Bom Jesus de Matosinhos | Congonhas, Brazil | Built 1757-1818. |
| | Fortress of Quíloa | Kilwa Kisiwani, Tanzania | Built 1505-1512. |
| | Fortess of Jesus | Mombasa, Kenya | Built 1585-1588. |
| | Church & Convent of Santo Antônio | Recife, Brazil | Built 1606-1770 |
| | Fortress of Bahrain | Manama, Bahrain | Built 1519-1561. |
| | Castle of São Jorge da Mina | Elmina, Ghana | Built 1482-1498. |
| | Fortress of Baçaim | Vasai, India | Built 1536-1582. |
| | Fortress of Nossa Senhora da Conceição | Hormuz, Iran | Built 1515-1591 |
| | Monastery of São Bento | Rio de Janeiro, Brazil | Built 1633-1798. |
| | Colónia do Sacramento | Colonia del Sacramento, Uruguay | Built 1680-1777. |
| | Portuguese Historic Center of Malacca and A Famosa | Malacca City, Malaysia | Built 1511-1641. |
| | Basilica & Monastery of São Bento | Olinda, Brazil | Built 1631-1656. |
| | Fortress of Safim | Safi, Morocco | Built 1508-1541. |
| | Church of Nossa Senhora do Carmo | Luanda, Angola | Built 1660-1930. |
| | Fortress of the Prince of Beira | Costa Marques, Brazil | Built 1776-1783. |
