= Federal Institute of Minas Gerais =

Academic publisher

Federal Institute of Education, Science and Technology of Minas Gerais
- Portuguese: Instituto Federal de Educação, Ciência e Tecnologia de Minas Gerais
- Other names: Federal Institute of Minas Gerais; IFMG
- Type: Polytechnic university
- Established: 2010; 16 years ago
- Location: Belo Horizonte; Bambuí; Congonhas; Formiga; Governador Valadares; Ouro Preto; Ouro Branco; São João Evangelista; João Monlevade, Minas Gerais, Brazil
- Campus: Urban, multiple sites
- Website: www.ifmg.edu.br

The Federal Institute of Minas Gerais (Portuguese: Instituto Federal de Minas Gerais, IFMG), or in full: Federal Institute of Education, Science and Technology of Minas Gerais (Portuguese: Instituto Federal de Educação, Ciência e Tecnologia de Minas Gerais) is a polytechnic university or community college located in the Brazilian cities of Belo Horizonte, Bambuí, Congonhas, Formiga, Governador Valadares, Ouro Preto, Ouro Branco, São João Evangelista and João Monlevade.

The institution was created by Centro Federal de Educação Tecnológica de Ouro Preto, and the campus of Congonhas and Bambuí, by Centro Federal de Educação Tecnológica de Bambuí e the campus of Formiga and São João Evangelista, Escola Agrotécnica Federal de São João Evangelista.

== See also ==
- Federal Institute of São Paulo
- Federal University of Minas Gerais
