= Congonhas =

Municipality in Minas Gerais, Brazil

- Municipality
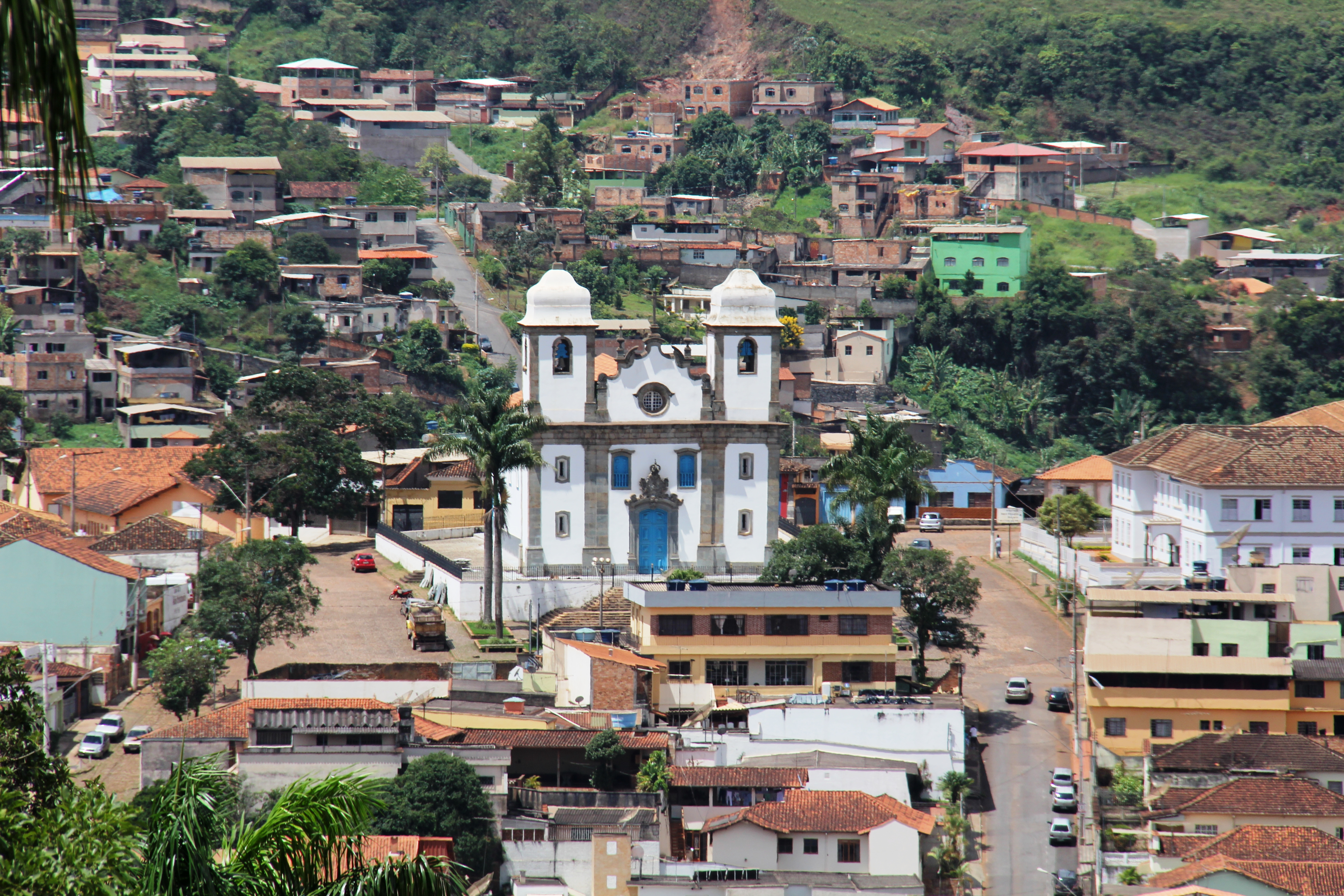
- Nossa Senhora da Conceição Church and part of the municipal seat

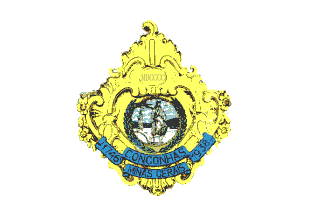
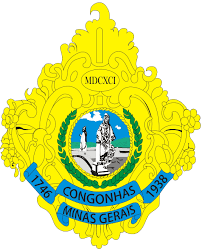
- Flag Coat of arms
- Nickname: Cidade dos Profetas ("City of the Prophets")
- Location in Minas Gerais
- Coordinates: 20°29′59″S 43°51′28″W
- Country: Brazil
- Region: Southeast
- State: Minas Gerais
- Intermediate region: Barbacena
- Immediate region: Conselheiro Lafaiete
- Municipality established: 17 December 1938
- Districts: Congonhas, Alto Maranhão, and Lobo Leite

Government
  - Mayor: Anderson Costa Cabido (PSB)
  - Vice mayor: José de Freitas Cordeiro (PSDB)

Area
  - Total: 304.067 km^{2} (117.401 sq mi)

Population (2022 census)
  - Total: 52,890
  - Estimate (2025): 55,272
  - Density: 173.9/km^{2} (450.5/sq mi)
- Demonym: congonhense
- Time zone: UTC−3 (BRT)
- Postal code: 36410-001–36419-999
- Area code: 31
- HDI-M (2010): 0.753 – high
- IBGE code: 3118007
- Website: www.congonhas.mg.gov.br

Congonhas is a municipality in central Minas Gerais, Brazil. Its municipal seat grew during the gold rush of the early eighteenth century and became a regional pilgrimage center after construction of the Sanctuary of Bom Jesus de Matosinhos began in 1757. The municipality covers 304.067 km^{2} (117.401 sq mi) and had 52,890 residents in the 2022 census.

Above the older part of the town, the Sanctuary of Bom Jesus de Matosinhos brings together an eighteenth-century church, a terraced forecourt lined with twelve soapstone prophets, and chapels containing polychrome sculptural groups from the Passion of Christ. Much of the sculpture was made by Antônio Francisco Lisboa, known as Aleijadinho, with members of his workshop. UNESCO inscribed the sanctuary on the World Heritage List in 1985, recognizing the architectural and sculptural complex as an exceptional achievement of Baroque art in Latin America. Pilgrimage remains part of the town's character. The annual Jubilee of Bom Jesus de Matosinhos, held each September, brings worshippers from Minas Gerais and other states to the sanctuary.

Congonhas later became one of the iron-mining centers of the Iron Quadrangle. Large-scale extraction expanded after the Casa de Pedra mine was incorporated into Companhia Siderúrgica Nacional in the 1940s and grew sharply again in the early twenty-first century. CSN Mineração and Vale operate mines in the municipality, and extractive industries accounted for about 40 percent of formal employment in 2021. Mining has brought high levels of industrial output and employment, while open pits, waste piles and mining structures occupy extensive areas around the town and its waterways.

== Toponymy ==
The name "Congonhas" comes from congonha, a shrub once common in the fields around the town. (Note: The municipality was officially named "Congonhas do Campo" until 1948, when the name was shortened to "Congonhas".) Tea made from its leaves was used in the region before Portuguese settlement.

Linguist Eduardo de Almeida Navarro traces the plant name to the southern língua geral, with Guarani influence. The related form congõi occurs in Antonio Ruiz de Montoya's 1639 Tesoro de la lengua guaraní, a Classical Guarani–Spanish dictionary.

== History ==
=== Gold mining and early settlement ===
Settlement began around 1700 as gold mining spread through central Minas Gerais. Mining camps grew beside streams and along roads used by people and goods moving between the mining districts. The present municipality grew from three colonial settlements: Congonhas do Campo, Soledade, now Lobo Leite, and Redondo, now Alto Maranhão. All three stood along routes through the mining country of central Minas Gerais.

Congonhas do Campo grew on the banks of the Ribeirão das Congonhas, later called the Maranhão River. Gold was worked in the watercourses and on nearby slopes, largely with enslaved labor. The river also formed part of the boundary between the comarcas of Ouro Preto and Rio das Mortes. The parish church side belonged to Ouro Preto, while Matosinhos on the opposite bank belonged to Rio das Mortes. The division persisted into the nineteenth century, when travelers still described the two sides as separate settlements.

A parish dedicated to Nossa Senhora da Conceição was established during the first half of the eighteenth century, although the surviving dates for its creation differ. Congonhas do Campo became a district on 6 November 1746 and remained part of Ouro Preto.

=== Enslaved people and the Rosário brotherhood ===
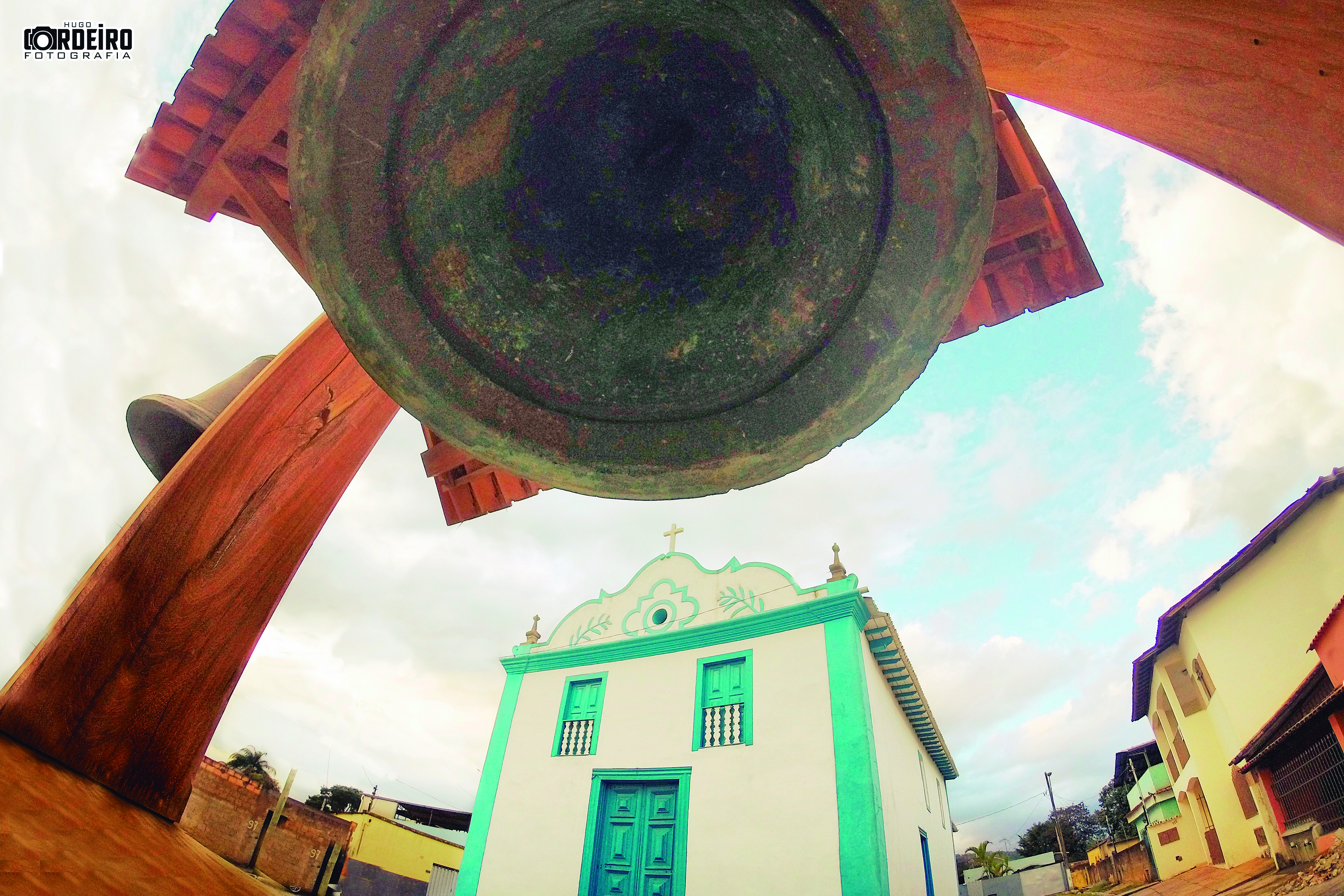
Church of Nossa Senhora do Rosário dos Pretos, built by the Black community of colonial Congonhas

Gold mining relied on enslaved labor. The Chapel of Nossa Senhora do Rosário dos Pretos was already in use by 1729, when a baptism was celebrated there. Its construction date is uncertain, but the church was built by enslaved people from Congonhas and the surrounding mining area.

The Irmandade de Nossa Senhora do Rosário de Congonhas do Campo included enslaved and free Black members and organized worship around devotion to Our Lady of the Rosary. It belonged to a wider group of Black Catholic confraternities established in the parishes around Vila Rica. Congonhas had a Rosário chaplain by 1748. In 1784, the brotherhood hired João Nepomuceno Correia de Castro to paint the chapel ceiling and carry out other work on the building.

Members of the brotherhood were buried beneath the church floor until their remains were transferred to the Nossa Senhora da Conceição cemetery during a later renovation. Among the church's images are Saint Benedict and Saint Iphigenia, saints with a long history of devotion among Black Catholics. The Rosário church later became a gathering place for Congado celebrations in Congonhas.

=== Sanctuary and pilgrimage ===
Across the Maranhão River, Matosinhos grew around the Sanctuary of Bom Jesus de Matosinhos. In 1757, the Portuguese miner Feliciano Mendes began collecting donations for a sanctuary dedicated to Bom Jesus de Matosinhos after recovering from a serious illness. He obtained permission for the project and continued collecting money until his death in 1765. Religious services were already being held there while the church was under construction.

Donations from pilgrims and residents paid for work on the sanctuary. The church, forecourt and chapels were built and decorated in stages through the late eighteenth and early nineteenth centuries. The Jubilee of Bom Jesus de Matosinhos received papal authorization in 1779, and the first official celebration followed in 1780. As gold production declined, pilgrims continued to arrive from other parts of Minas Gerais.

Around the turn of the nineteenth century, Antônio Francisco Lisboa, known as Aleijadinho, and members of his workshop made the sculptural groups depicting the Passion of Christ and the twelve soapstone prophets that stand before the church. The sanctuary was largely complete by the early nineteenth century. Pilgrims continued to come to Congonhas after the gold boom had passed.

=== Nineteenth century ===
As the older gold workings declined, ironmaking began nearby. In 1811, German engineer Wilhelm Ludwig von Eschwege established the Fábrica Patriótica at Prata, near Congonhas do Campo. Iron production began in 1812, and the works remained active until 1831. It was the first ironworks in Brazil to produce iron on an industrial scale. The site is now within the municipality of Ouro Preto, although nineteenth-century writing often referred to it as being at Congonhas do Campo.

Lazarist priests arrived in 1827 to administer the sanctuary. They opened a seminary and a school, bringing students and clergy into the town. Farms around Congonhas grew food and sugar cane and raised livestock, while small-scale gold mining continued.

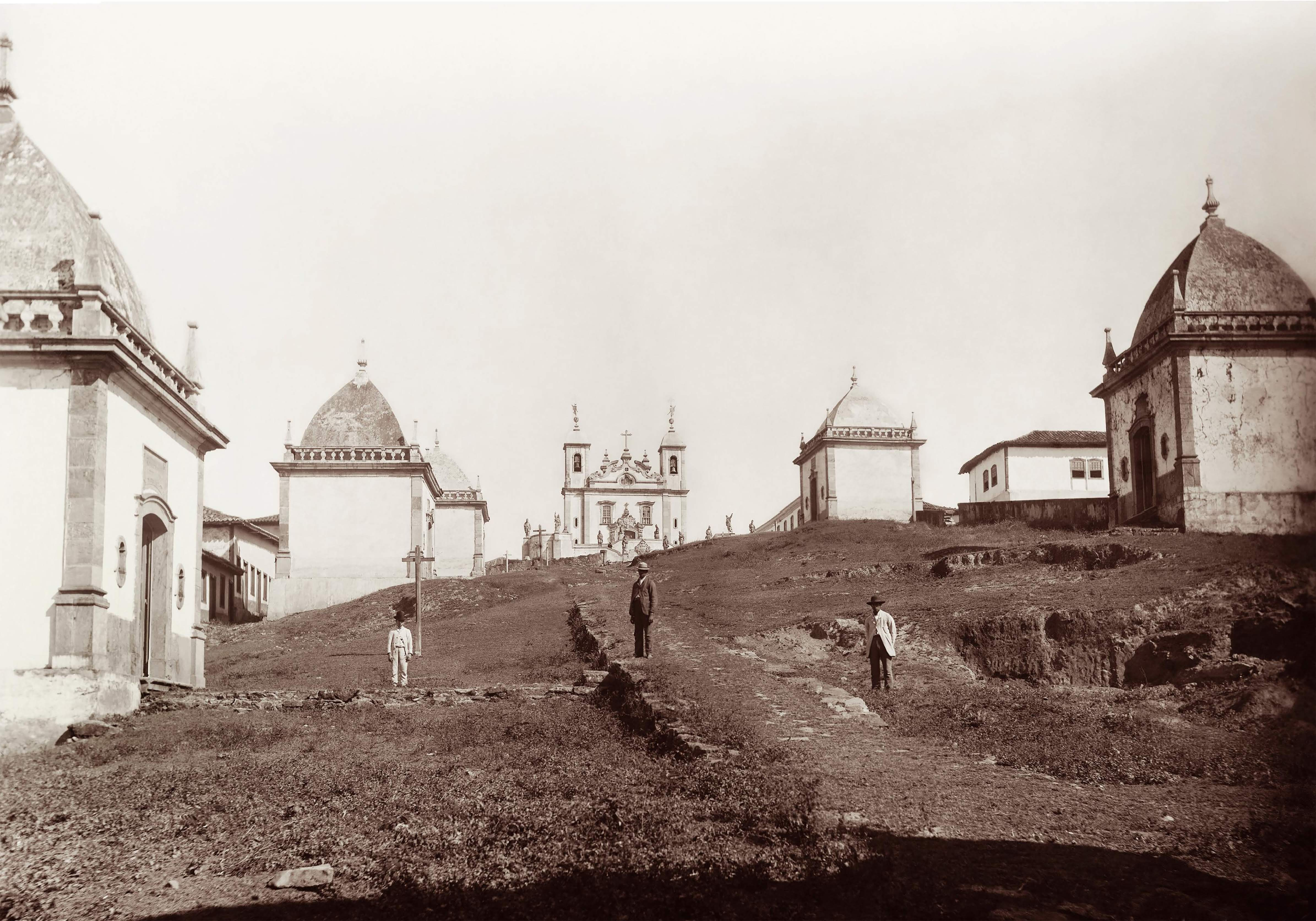
Congonhas in 1880, photographed by Marc Ferrez

By the late nineteenth century, Congonhas was still a small town whose streets clustered around its churches and pilgrimage routes, with farms extending beyond the built-up area.

=== Railway and municipal formation ===
Iron extraction at Casa de Pedra began before Congonhas became a municipality. Danish investor Arn Kirstein Thun acquired the property in 1911, and production began in 1913 using largely manual methods.

The Estrada de Ferro Central do Brasil reached Congonhas in 1914. The station opened on 14 November. By 1917, the Paraopeba line connected the town with Belo Horizonte and with railway routes toward Rio de Janeiro.

Congonhas do Campo remained a district of Ouro Preto until 1923, when it was transferred to Queluz, later renamed Conselheiro Lafaiete. It became a municipality on 17 December 1938, initially comprising Congonhas do Campo and Lobo Leite.

Federal protection of the older town followed soon afterward. The Sanctuary of Bom Jesus de Matosinhos received federal heritage protection in 1939, and the architectural and urban ensemble around the old town was protected in 1941.

Alto Maranhão was transferred from Conselheiro Lafaiete to Congonhas do Campo in 1943. The municipality took the shorter name Congonhas in 1948.

=== Industrial mining and urban growth ===
Iron mining expanded quickly after World War II. The Casa de Pedra mine was incorporated into the state-owned Companhia Siderúrgica Nacional in 1946 to supply iron ore to its steelworks at Volta Redonda. Jobs at the mine drew new residents to Congonhas and extended the built-up area beyond the older settlement around the churches and railway.

CSN built about 500 houses near Casa de Pedra. Vila Rica housed engineers, while Vila Operária housed other employees. Schools, a hospital, a cinema and a club served the company settlement. The new neighborhoods extended Congonhas toward the mine, away from the older churches and pilgrimage streets.

The population rose with the expansion of mining. Congonhas had 5,572 residents in 1940, 14,699 in 1960 and 30,776 in 1980. A growing share of residents lived in the urban area as the town expanded.

CSN was privatized in 1993. Production at Casa de Pedra increased after privatization as new technology was introduced, and iron extraction expanded again during the early twenty-first century. Pits, processing plants, rail facilities and waste structures spread across large areas around the municipal seat, including sites close to established neighborhoods and the protected colonial town.

== Geography ==
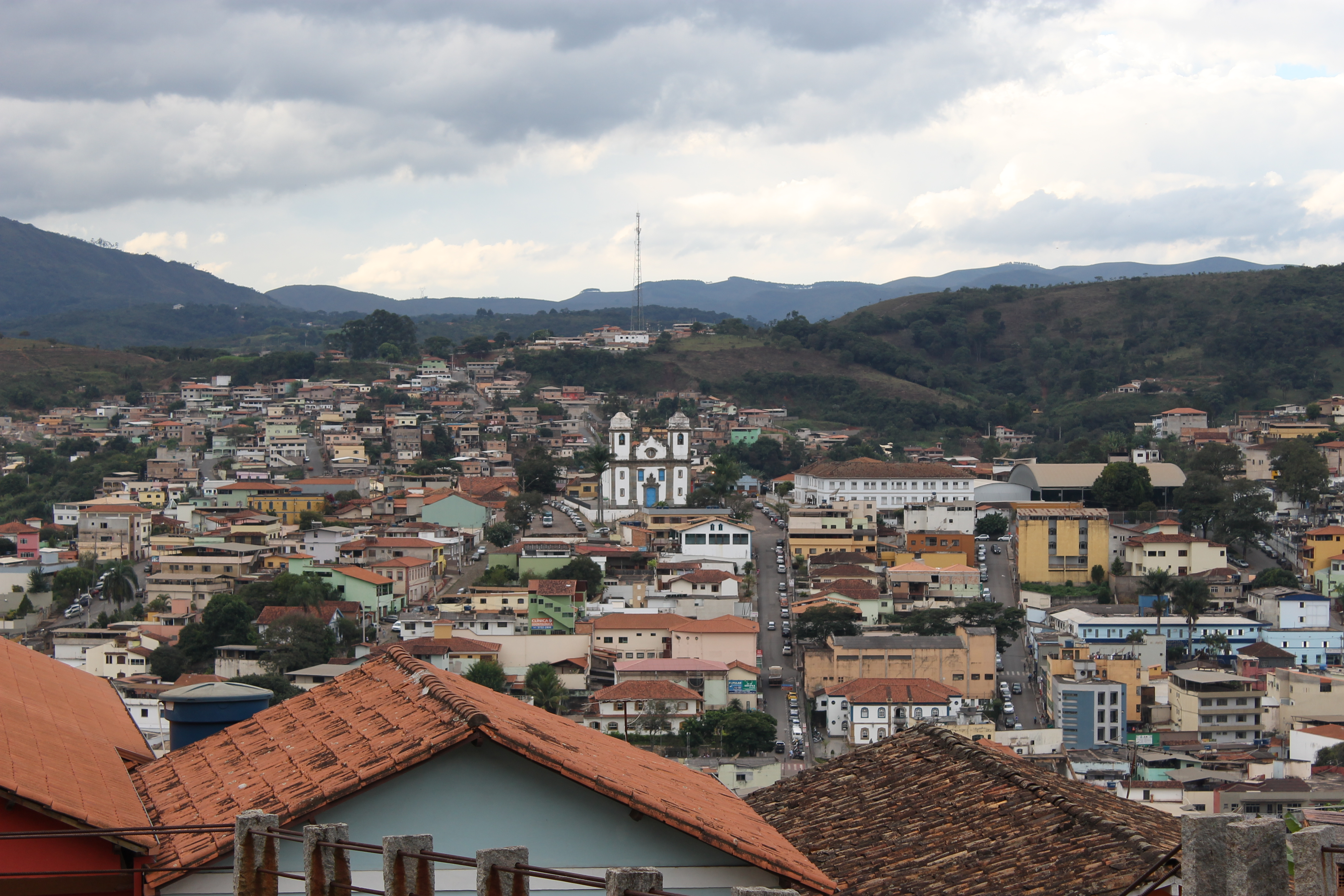
View across the municipal seat

Congonhas covers 304.067 km^{2} (117.401 sq mi) in central Minas Gerais. It borders Belo Vale and Ouro Preto to the north, Ouro Preto and Ouro Branco to the east, Conselheiro Lafaiete and São Brás do Suaçuí to the south, and Jeceaba to the west. The municipality has three districts: Congonhas, which contains the municipal seat, Alto Maranhão, and Lobo Leite.

=== Districts ===
Alto Maranhão and Lobo Leite grew from Redondo and Soledade, two colonial mining settlements that later became part of Congonhas.

Alto Maranhão was formerly called Redondo. It received its present name in 1918, when it still belonged to Queluz, later Conselheiro Lafaiete. The district became part of Congonhas do Campo in 1943. Its Chapel of Nossa Senhora da Ajuda dates to 1746 and received state heritage protection in 1978.

Lobo Leite grew from the mining settlement of Soledade. It was later called Felipe dos Santos before taking the name Lobo Leite in 1926. It became part of Congonhas do Campo when the municipality was established in 1938. The Church of Nossa Senhora da Soledade was built around the eighteenth century and received state heritage protection in 1978.

A railway station opened at Lobo Leite in 1886 on the line later operated by the Estrada de Ferro Central do Brasil. Passenger service ended, but freight trains continue to use the line. The Caminho Velho branch of the Estrada Real also passes through the district.

=== Physical geography ===
The municipal seat spreads across hilly ground on the two sides of the Maranhão River. Congonhas lies at the southwestern edge of the Iron Quadrangle, where ridges and rounded hills rise above narrow river valleys. The underlying rocks include iron formations, schists, phyllites and granitoids. These iron-bearing rocks contain the ore deposits worked around the municipality, including the Casa de Pedra mine about 10 km (6.2 mi) from the town.

The local geology can also be seen in the older town. Granite and steatite from the region were used in churches, sculpture and street paving. Granite forms structural parts of the façade of the Sanctuary of Bom Jesus de Matosinhos, while soapstone was used for architectural details and the sculptures on the forecourt. Older streets were paved with rounded stones from stream beds and pieces of soapstone laid over the ground.

The Maranhão River drains most of the municipality and crosses the urban area before joining the Paraopeba River. The Paraopeba runs along the western side of Congonhas and belongs to the São Francisco River basin. The Santo Antônio, Goiabeiras and Soledade streams flow into the Maranhão within the municipality.

Congonhas lies in a transition zone between the Atlantic Forest and the Cerrado. Semideciduous forest remains alongside Cerrado vegetation and open grasslands, although mining, pasture, roads and urban expansion have replaced much of the original vegetation.

=== Climate ===
Congonhas has warm, rainy summers and cooler, much drier winters. Average monthly highs range from about 21 °C (70 °F) in June and July to 26 °C (79 °F) in February. Average lows fall to about 11 °C (52 °F) from June through August. Most rain falls from November through March. December averages 313 mm (12.3 in) of precipitation, compared with 12 mm (0.5 in) in July.

Climate data for Congonhas
Month	Jan	Feb	Mar	Apr	May	Jun	Jul	Aug	Sep	Oct	Nov	Dec	Year
Mean daily maximum °C (°F)	25 (77)	26 (79)	25 (77)	23 (73)	22 (72)	21 (70)	21 (70)	23 (73)	24 (75)	25 (77)	24 (75)	25 (77)	24 (75)
Mean daily minimum °C (°F)	17 (63)	17 (63)	17 (63)	15 (59)	13 (55)	11 (52)	11 (52)	11 (52)	13 (55)	15 (59)	16 (61)	17 (63)	14 (58)
Average precipitation mm (inches)	264 (10.4)	173 (6.8)	215 (8.5)	93 (3.7)	47 (1.9)	19 (0.7)	12 (0.5)	24 (0.9)	79 (3.1)	132 (5.2)	257 (10.1)	313 (12.3)	1,628 (64.1)
Source: Climatempo, 30-year observed series

=== Mining and environment ===
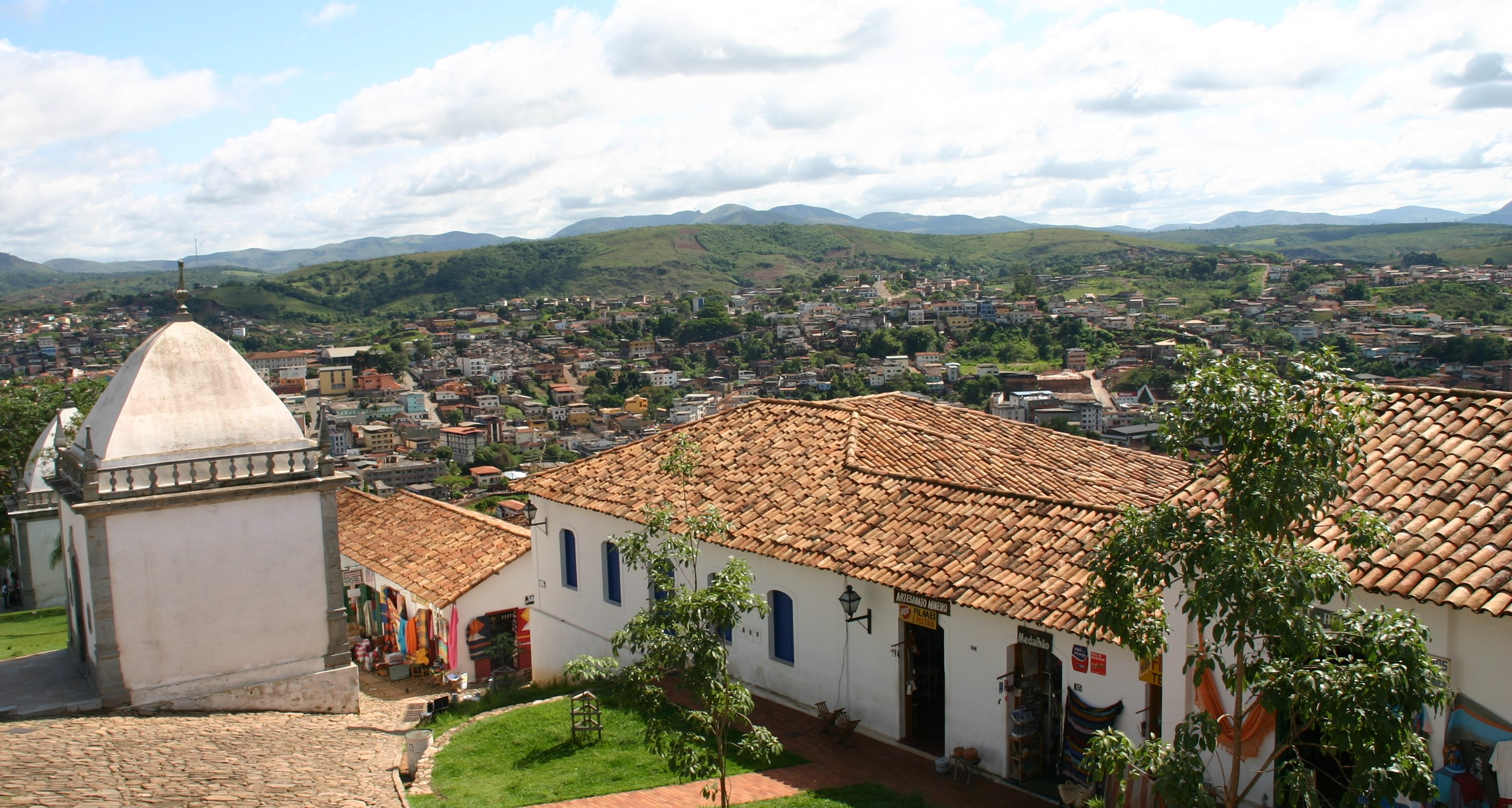
The town and surrounding hills seen from the Sanctuary of Bom Jesus de Matosinhos

Open-pit mines, ore-processing plants, waste piles and mining dams occupy large areas around the municipal seat and extend toward Belo Vale, Ouro Preto and Ouro Branco. Some lie within the urban perimeter or close to residential communities. Expansion of the Casa de Pedra complex has cleared areas of semideciduous forest and Cerrado vegetation. Its environmental licensing required compensatory conservation measures elsewhere.

Mining and the protected old town occupy the same narrow valleys and hillsides. Pits, processing plants, waste structures and transport lines stand close to some neighborhoods and protected sites around the municipal seat. Mining may also affect the stonework of the sanctuary. Some granite blocks on its façade have developed yellow-brown discoloration. Mônica Pessoa Neves, Antônio Gilberto Costa and Úrsula de Azevedo Ruchkys proposed that fine iron-bearing particles carried by the wind from mining areas were one likely cause, alongside natural changes in iron minerals within the stone.

The waterways crossing the mining area drain toward the Maranhão and Paraopeba rivers. Heavy rain in January 2026 caused water and sediment to overflow from operational areas at Vale's Fábrica complex, near the Congonhas–Ouro Preto boundary, and at the Viga mine in Congonhas. Sediment reached the Maranhão River. State authorities ordered cleanup, river monitoring and an environmental recovery plan. The National Mining Agency found no rupture or structural failure of a mining dam or waste pile in either incident.

== Demographics ==
=== Population growth and urbanization ===
Congonhas had 5,572 residents in 1940, the first census after it became a municipality. The population passed 30,000 in 1980 and reached 48,519 in 2010. In 2022, the census counted 52,890 residents, with a population density of 173.94 inhabitants per square kilometer. The 2025 population estimate was 55,272.

Population by census (Note: The municipal boundaries changed between the 1940 and 1950 censuses. Alto Maranhão was transferred to Congonhas do Campo in 1943, so the two totals cover different territories.)
Census	Population	Change
1940	5,572	—N/a
1950	9,607	Boundary changed
1960	14,699	+53.0%
1970	20,374	+38.6%
1980	30,776	+51.1%
1991	35,364	+14.9%
2000	41,256	+16.7%
2010	48,519	+17.6%
2022	52,890	+9.0%

Sources: 1940, 1950, 1960, 1970–2010, and 2022.

Congonhas also became increasingly urban during the second half of the twentieth century. In 1970, 13,034 residents lived in urban areas and 7,340 in the countryside. By 2010, the urban population had risen to 47,236 while the rural population had fallen to 1,283. The municipal seat accounted for 39,696 residents in 2010.

Urban and rural population
Census	Urban	Rural	Urban share
1970	13,034	7,340	64.0%
1980	23,802	6,974	77.3%
1991	29,486	5,878	83.4%
2000	39,458	1,798	95.6%
2010	47,236	1,283	97.4%

Source: IBGE population censuses.

=== Population characteristics ===
In 2022, 27,601 residents identified as pardo, 18,376 as white and 6,831 as Black. Another 53 selected the census category yellow (amarela), and 29 identified as Indigenous.

Race or color, 2022
Category	Population	Share
Pardo	27,601	52.2%
White	18,376	34.7%
Black	6,831	12.9%
Yellow (amarela)	53	0.1%
Indigenous	29	0.1%

Source: 2022 Brazilian census.

The median age was 35 in 2022. The same census counted 140 quilombola residents.

=== Religion ===
Among residents aged 10 or older in 2022, 69.99 percent were Roman Catholic, 24.17 percent were evangelical and 3.78 percent reported no religion.

Religion, 2022
Religion	Share
Roman Catholic	69.99%
Evangelical	24.17%
No religion	3.78%
Other religions or religiosities	1.75%
Spiritist	0.19%
Umbanda and Candomblé	0.10%

Percentages refer to residents aged 10 or older. Categories below 0.05 percent are omitted. Source: 2022 Brazilian census.

=== Income and human development ===
Average monthly household income per person was R$1,419.41 in 2022. In 2010, 34.7 percent of residents lived in households with a nominal monthly income per person of no more than half the minimum wage.

Income inequality fell between the 1991 and 2010 censuses. The Gini coefficient for household income per person was 0.546 in 1991, 0.525 in 2000 and 0.505 in 2010.

Congonhas's Municipal Human Development Index (HDI-M) rose from 0.637 in 2000 to 0.753 in 2010. Its 2010 components were 0.732 for income, 0.877 for longevity and 0.665 for education.

== Economy ==
Iron ore mining accounts for a large share of employment and economic output in Congonhas. The municipality's gross domestic product was R$7.69 billion in 2023, equivalent to R$145,467.84 per resident. In 2021, extractive industries employed about 40 percent of formally registered workers. Public administration, commerce and transportation were the largest employers outside mining.

Selected sectors of formal employment, 2021
Sector	Share
Extractive industries	40.0%
Public administration	14.9%
Commerce	11.7%
Transportation and postal services	7.5%
Manufacturing	6.8%
Construction	4.9%
Accommodation and food services	4.0%
Health and social services	3.0%

Source: RAIS and DataViva data compiled by Alves.

=== Iron ore mining ===
CSN Mineração, a subsidiary of Companhia Siderúrgica Nacional, operates the Casa de Pedra mine. Ore is extracted and processed at the complex before being carried by MRS Logística trains to the Port of Itaguaí in Rio de Janeiro state.

Vale operates the Viga and Fábrica mines in Congonhas as part of its Paraopeba Complex. Iron ore is mined and processed at the two sites and carried by rail toward the company's port system.

Formal mining employment grew sharply during the early twenty-first century. Fewer than 1,000 people worked in mineral extraction in 2003. By 2021, the sector employed about 7,230 people, including approximately 7,180 in iron ore extraction.

The concentration of jobs and income in mining leaves the local economy sensitive to changes in iron ore production and prices. Mineral producers also pay the Financial Compensation for Mineral Exploitation, generally known by its Portuguese acronym CFEM. The federal mining royalty is shared with producing states and municipalities and with municipalities affected by mining infrastructure. In the first quarter of 2026, Congonhas accounted for 4.9 percent of CFEM collected across Brazil, the fifth-highest share among municipalities.

=== Commerce and agriculture ===
Outside mining, commerce, transportation, manufacturing and construction employ much of the formal workforce. Freight movement associated with the mines also supports railway and road transportation through the municipality.

Small-scale farming continues in rural parts of Congonhas. Family farms produce vegetables, fruit, milk and dairy products, while some properties grow ornamental plants.

== Culture ==
=== Sacred art and architecture ===
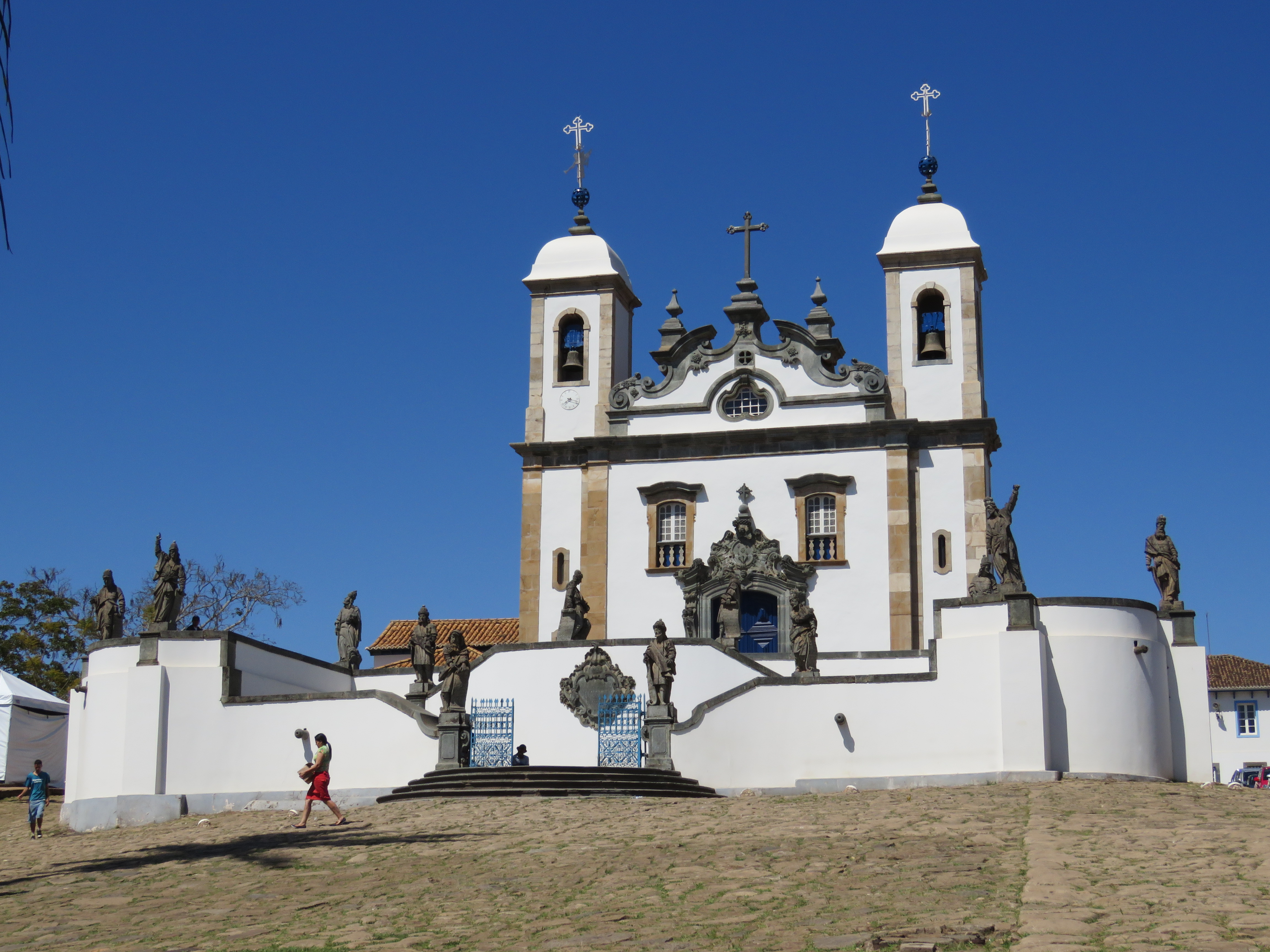
The Sanctuary of Bom Jesus de Matosinhos, with the prophets on the terraces before the basilica

The Sanctuary of Bom Jesus de Matosinhos occupies Morro Maranhão above the older part of the municipal seat. A terraced stairway and forecourt lead to the basilica, while six chapels along the approach contain 64 life-size cedar figures depicting scenes from the Passion of Christ. The twelve prophets on the stairway and forecourt are carved from soapstone.

Antônio Francisco Lisboa, known as Aleijadinho, worked at the sanctuary with members of his workshop near the end of the eighteenth century and in the early nineteenth century. They made the prophets and the sculptural groups in the Passion chapels. Painter Manuel da Costa Ataíde was among the other artists who worked on the complex. The Room of Miracles contains ex-votos left by worshippers, including 89 painted examples dating from the eighteenth to the twenty-first century.

Elsewhere in the town, the eighteenth-century Church of Nossa Senhora da Conceição has a chancel gilded by Manuel Francisco Lisboa and a soapstone portal attributed to Aleijadinho. The church and its contents received federal protection in 1950.

=== Historic center and protected urban ensemble ===
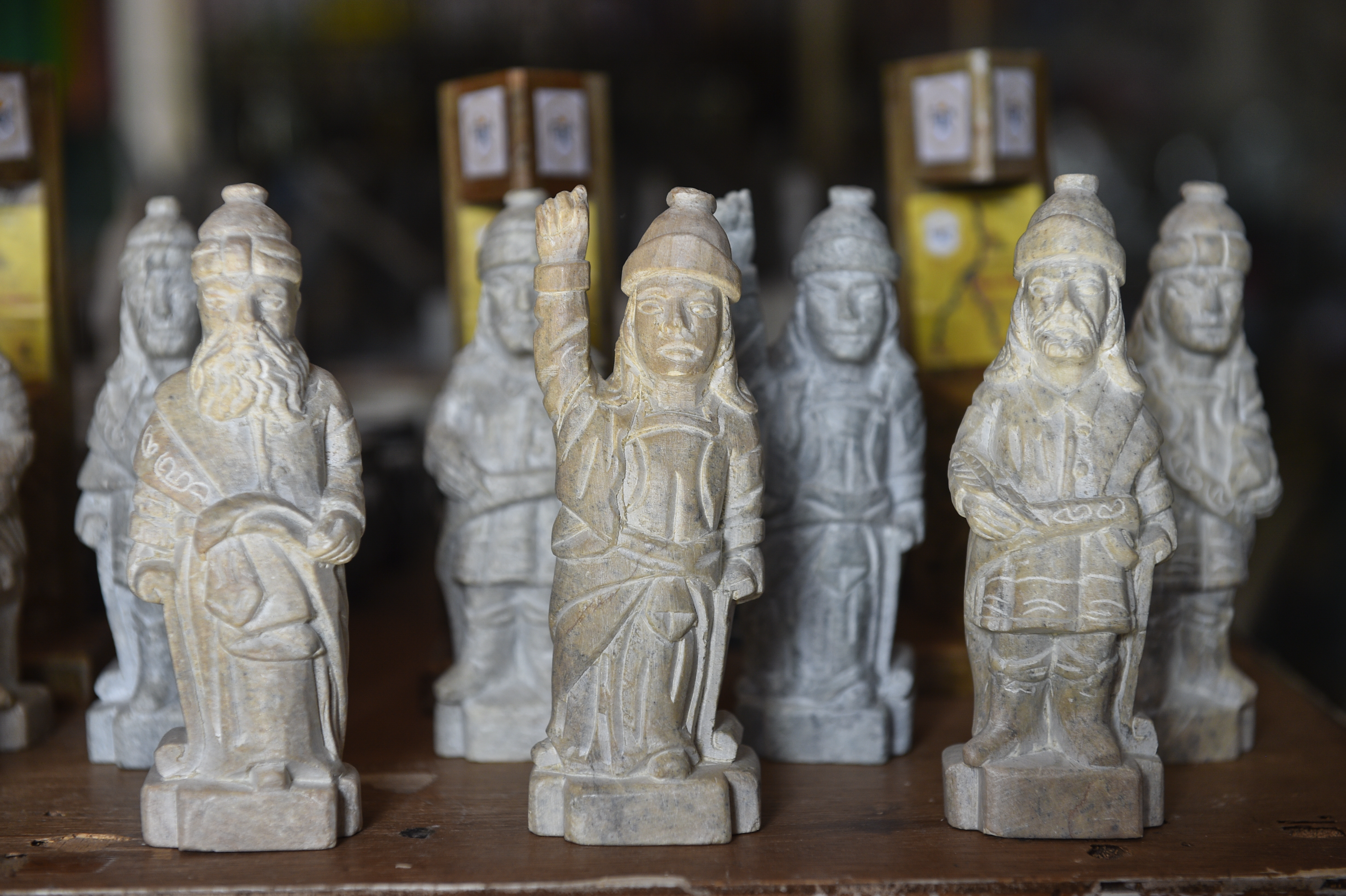
Beco dos Canudos, a steep lane beside the sanctuary

Part of the older town has been under federal protection since 17 March 1941, when the Architectural and Urban Ensemble of Congonhas was protected by IPHAN. The sanctuary itself had received separate federal protection two years earlier.

The older settlement spreads across the slopes on the two sides of the Maranhão River. The Church of Nossa Senhora da Conceição and the sanctuary occupy opposing heights, while the Church of Nossa Senhora do Rosário lies among the streets between them. The streets follow the hills rather than a regular grid. Rua Bom Jesus and the lanes approaching the sanctuary contain colonial houses alongside buildings from the nineteenth and twentieth centuries.

Beco dos Canudos retains a narrow, steep alignment beside the Passion chapels. Old houses line one side of the lane, with stone paving underfoot as it climbs toward the sanctuary. The protected streets remain residential and are also used for processions, worship and gatherings connected with the churches.

=== World Heritage status and conservation ===
The Sanctuary of Bom Jesus de Matosinhos received federal heritage protection on 8 September 1939. UNESCO inscribed it on the World Heritage List in 1985, five years after nearby Ouro Preto became Brazil's first cultural property on the list.

The property was inscribed under criteria (i) and (iv). UNESCO based criterion (i) on the artistic value of Aleijadinho's architectural and sculptural ensemble, while criterion (iv) concerned the sanctuary's place in the development of religious architecture in Portuguese America and the design of its Rococo façade and towers. The World Heritage property covers 2.19 ha (5.4 acres), surrounded by a 8.77 ha (21.7 acres) buffer zone.

When the property was inscribed, the World Heritage Committee asked for a large protection zone around it and noted assurances from the municipality that development in its surroundings would be controlled. The sanctuary lies within an urban area where housing, roads and mining have expanded close to the historic center.

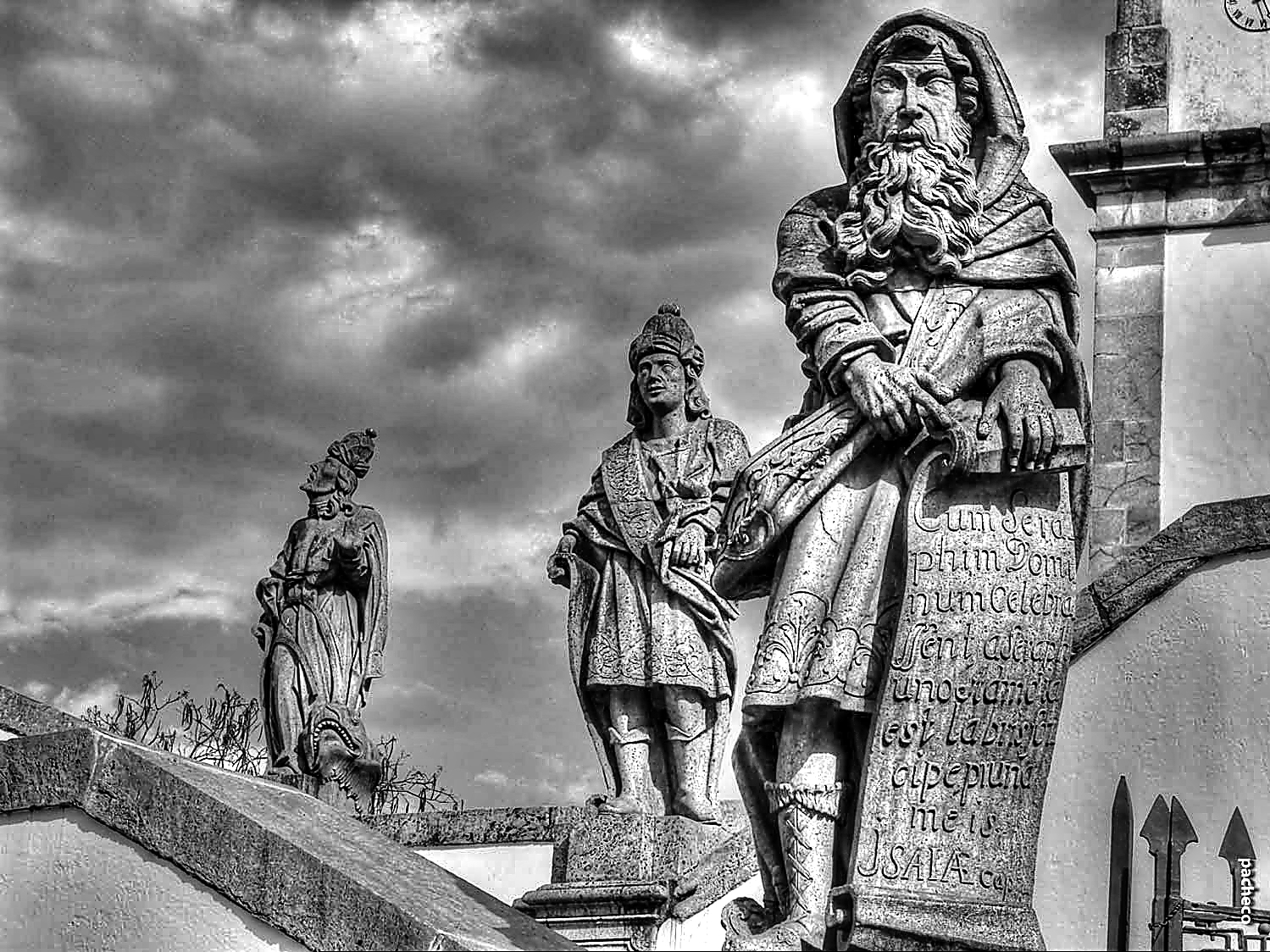
Soapstone prophets by Aleijadinho on the sanctuary forecourt

Because the prophets remain outdoors, their soapstone is exposed to weathering, fungi, bacteria and vandalism. Their condition has led to recurring debate over whether the originals should be moved indoors, although preventive treatment and monitoring have remained the preferred approach.

All twelve prophets have been recorded with three-dimensional scanning. The digital models allow conservators to compare their condition and can also be used to make accurate replicas if an original is irreversibly damaged. The Museu de Congonhas opened beside the sanctuary in 2015 and was conceived in part to support research and preventive conservation of stone sculpture.

=== Pilgrimage and religious traditions ===
Pilgrims were visiting the sanctuary while it was still under construction. Pope Pius VI authorized the Jubilee of Bom Jesus de Matosinhos in 1779, and the first official Jubilee followed in 1780. It is held from 7 to 14 September and brings pilgrims from Minas Gerais and other states.

A street fair occupies the approaches to the sanctuary during the Jubilee. It grew from the commerce that supplied pilgrims who once spent days in Congonhas because the journey home was difficult. Families near the sanctuary also provided rooms and meals to visitors.

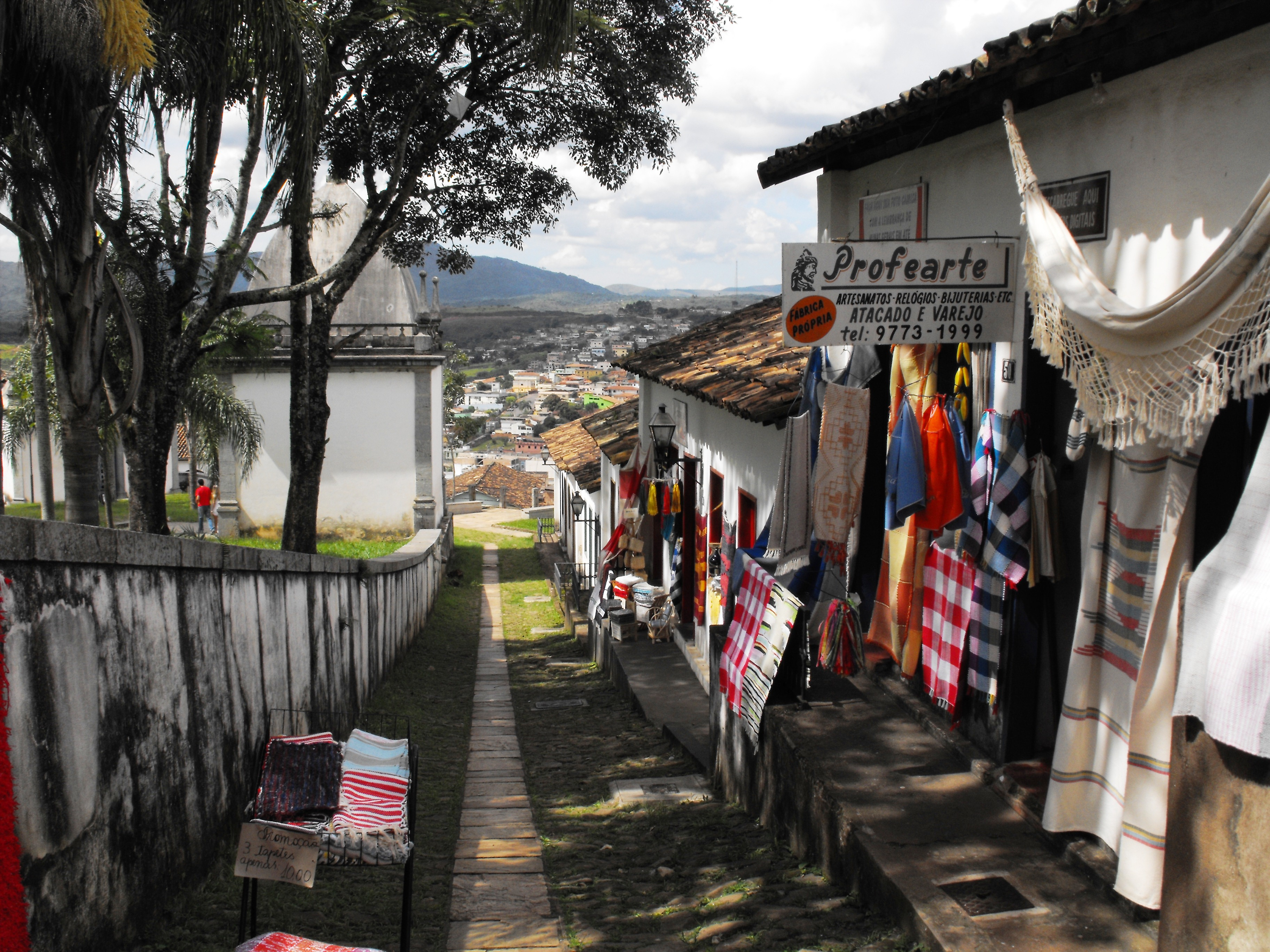
The Romaria complex near the sanctuary

For part of the twentieth century, poorer pilgrims could stay at the Romaria, a large lodging complex beside the sanctuary. It closed in the early 1960s and was demolished in 1966, apart from its entrance portals and part of its foundations. Architect Sylvio de Podestá designed a reconstruction in 1993, and the first stage opened in 1995 as the Centro Cultural da Romaria.

Congado and Folia de Reis are practiced in Congonhas alongside the Jubilee and parish feasts. Congado groups gather for the feast of Nossa Senhora do Rosário and for meetings with groups from neighboring municipalities. Folia groups travel between homes and churches during the Christmas and Epiphany season. Alto Maranhão holds a celebration of the Menino Jesus and São Sebastião with visiting Folia groups.

Church bells announce Masses, processions, funerals, feast days and celebrations such as Holy Week and Christmas. Bell ringers learn the different patterns by listening and working alongside more experienced practitioners in the church towers. Bell ringing in Minas Gerais and the craft of the bell ringer have been federally registered as intangible heritage since 2009, with their registrations renewed in 2024. Congonhas is one of nine reference cities, alongside Ouro Preto, Mariana, São João del-Rei, Diamantina and other towns in Minas Gerais.

Holy Week brings processions through the old streets. During the Procession of the Encounter, the image of Jesus carrying the cross leaves the Basilica of Bom Jesus de Matosinhos while the image of Our Lady of Sorrows leaves the Church of Nossa Senhora do Rosário. The processions meet before the Church of Nossa Senhora da Conceição.

Actors also perform the cycle As Cenas da Paixão Segundo Congonhas during Holy Week. Scenes from Christ's final days are staged around the historic town, with the Passion and Crucifixion performed before the basilica on Good Friday.

=== Museums, arts and food ===
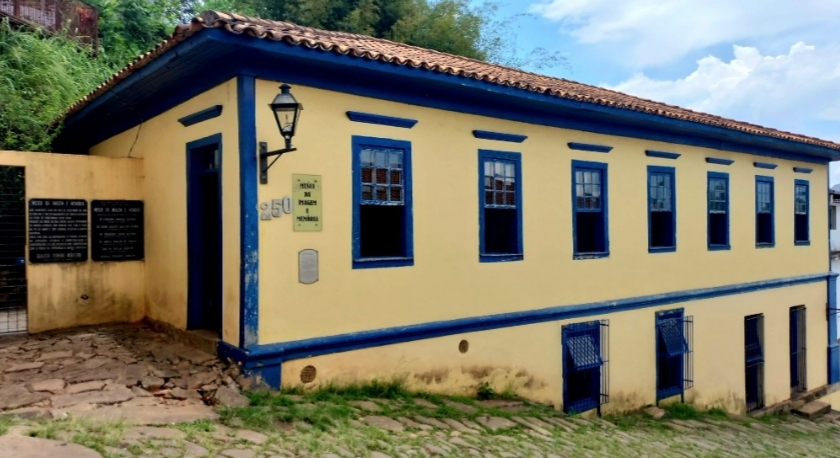
Museu da Imagem e Memória

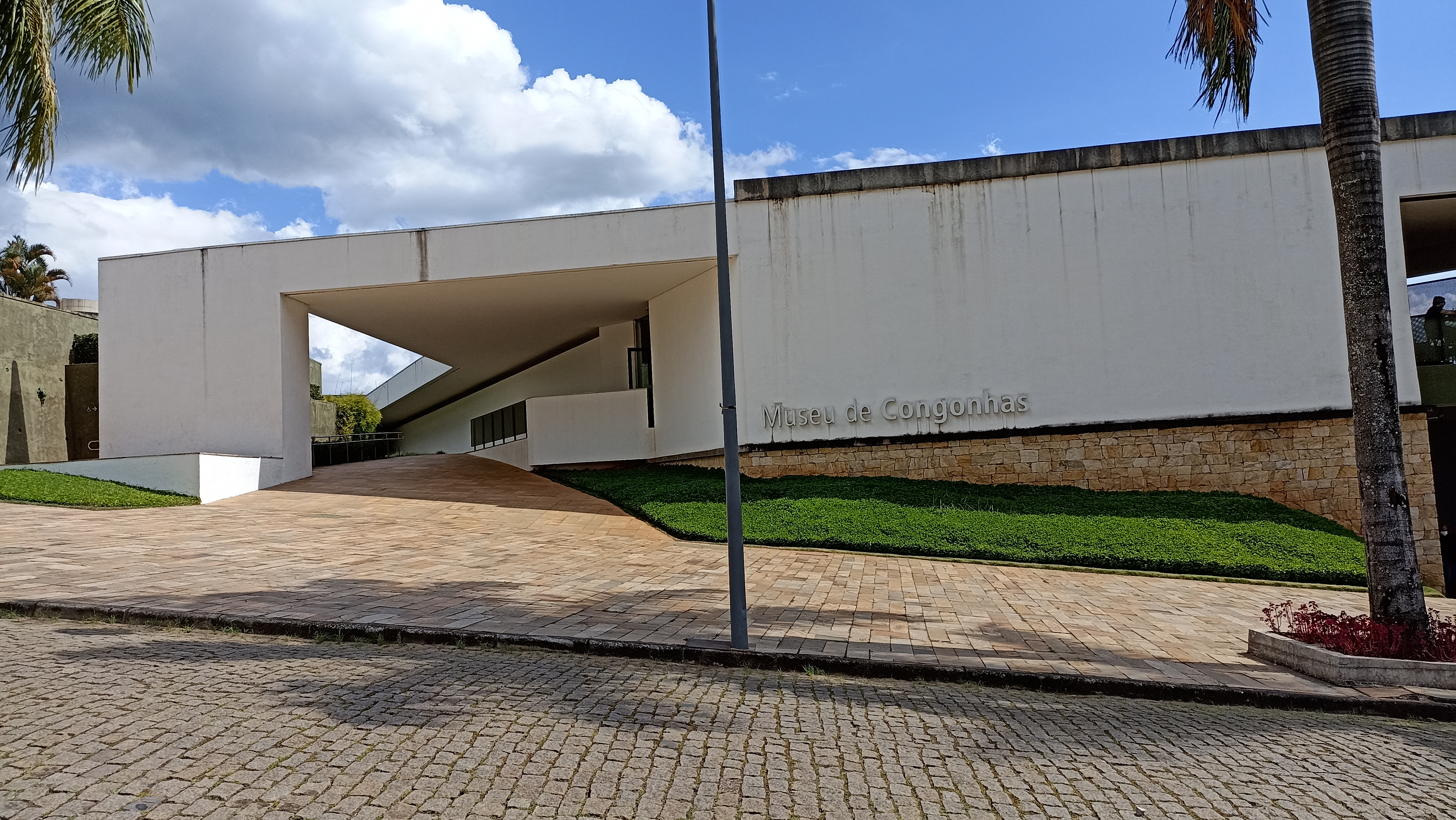
Museu de Congonhas, beside the sanctuary

The Museu de Congonhas opened beside the sanctuary in December 2015 in a building designed by architect Gustavo Penna after a national competition. Its exhibitions cover the sanctuary, pilgrimage, ex-votos, Aleijadinho and the artisans who worked on the complex. The museum also holds material used in the study and conservation of the outdoor stone sculptures.

The Museu da Imagem e Memória opened in 2001 in an old house on Rua Bom Jesus. Photographs, documents and objects trace the growth of the town and the lives of its residents. The reconstructed Romaria is also used for exhibitions and performances.

Congonhas holds an annual winter arts festival with concerts, theater, dance and exhibitions. The festival reached its 31st edition in 2026.

Soapstone carving is practiced by artisans in Congonhas, who make sculptural and household pieces from the same stone used in much of the town's colonial art. Baked foods known in Minas Gerais as quitandas are another local custom. The Festival da Quitanda, held at the Romaria, reached its 25th edition in 2025 and brings together bakers and other food producers from Congonhas and nearby towns.

== Tourism and historic routes ==
Tourism in Congonhas focuses on the Sanctuary of Bom Jesus de Matosinhos and the older part of the town. The churches, Romaria, Museu de Congonhas and Museu da Imagem e Memória provide other places to visit around the historic center. The Jubilee of Bom Jesus de Matosinhos also brings pilgrims to the town each September.

Congonhas belongs to IGR Ouro, the state tourism region administered by the Associação dos Municípios do Circuito do Ouro. The association groups Congonhas with former gold-mining towns including Ouro Preto, Mariana, Ouro Branco, Sabará and Catas Altas.

=== Estrada Real ===
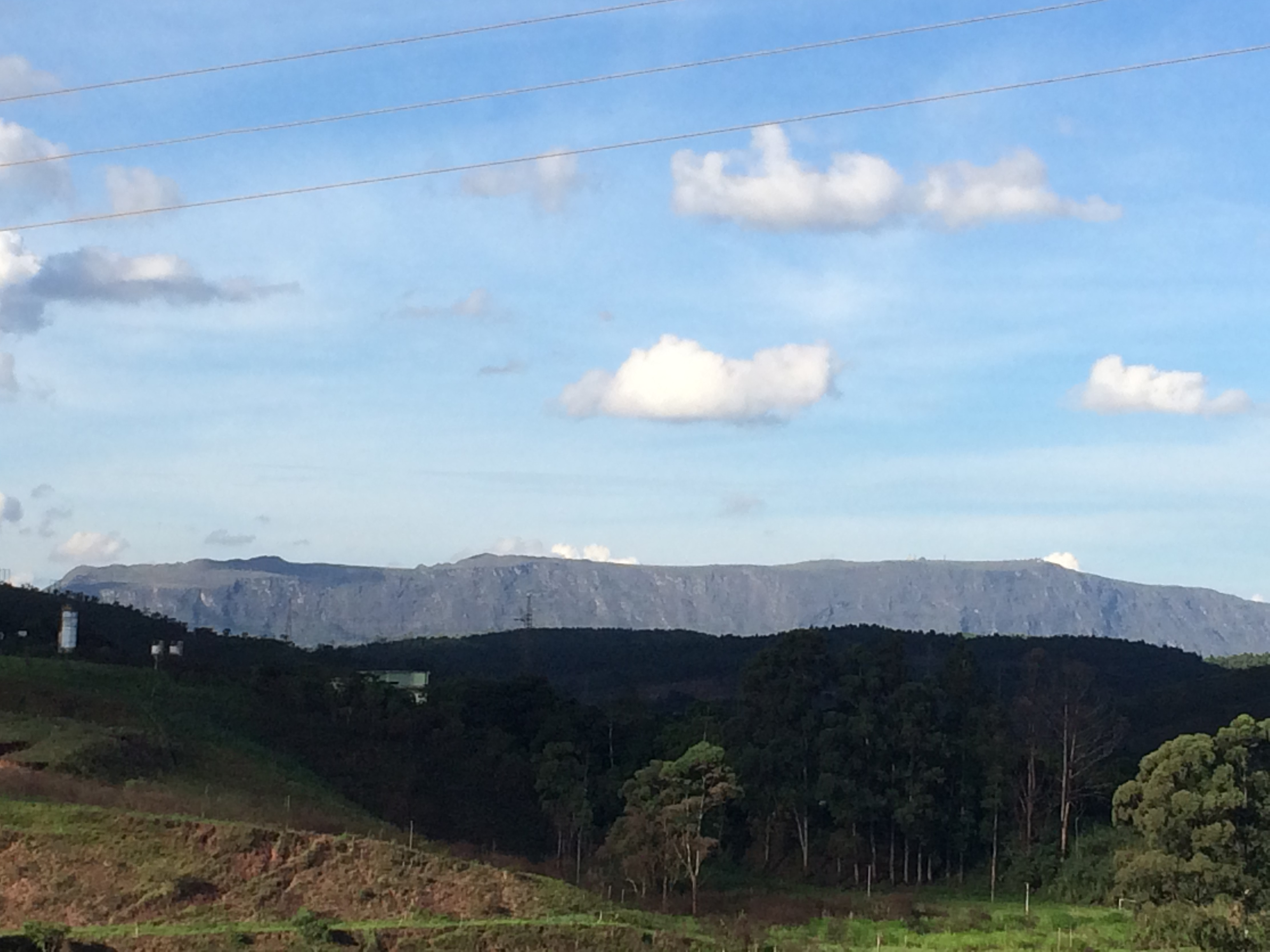
The Estrada Real at Joaquim Murtinho, in the municipality of Congonhas

Congonhas lies on the Estrada Real, the network of roads used by the Portuguese Crown to connect the mining districts of Minas Gerais with ports and other settlements. Gold, supplies and travelers passed through these routes during the colonial period. Parts of the old roads are followed by the present Estrada Real tourism route.

The Caminho Velho, the oldest of the principal Estrada Real routes between the mining region and the coast, passes through Congonhas. The mapped route runs through the municipal seat and Lobo Leite, with one section joining the two along predominantly rural roads.

The Caminho da Estrada Real became a national monument under federal law in 2023. Congonhas is explicitly included among the municipalities covered by the designation.

== Politics and government ==
Congonhas is governed by a mayor, a vice mayor and a 13-member Municipal Chamber. The mayor and vice mayor are elected together, while the chamber is elected separately and passes municipal laws and the budget. The municipality has been governed under its present Organic Law since 19 November 1990.

Anderson Costa Cabido of the PSB began his third term as mayor on 1 January 2025, with José de Freitas Cordeiro as vice mayor. Cabido won the 2024 election with 12,193 votes, 36.01 percent of the valid total. He had previously served from 2005 through 2012. Cordeiro was vice mayor during those terms and served as mayor from 2013 through 2020.

The 13 chamber seats elected in 2024 were divided among eight parties. The PL won three seats, more than any other party. Averaldo Pereira da Silva of the PL is president of the chamber for the 2025–2026 biennium.

The first municipal administrations after 1938 were headed by mayors appointed by the state government. Nicola Falabela became the first elected mayor in 1947.

== Education ==
In 2022, 98.94 percent of residents aged 6 to 14 attended school. Among residents aged 15 or older, 96.8 percent were literate.

=== Basic education ===
In 2023, elementary schools in Congonhas had 6,726 students and secondary schools had 2,068. The municipality had 35 elementary schools and six secondary schools.

Basic education, 2023
Level	Enrollments	Teachers	Schools
Elementary	6,726	432	35
Secondary	2,068	196	6

Source: IBGE.

More than 7,000 students were enrolled in the municipal school system at the beginning of the 2025 school year. Beginning that year, municipal schools gradually expanded full-time classes in early-childhood and elementary education, lengthening the school day with academic and extracurricular activities.

In 2023, the Basic Education Development Index (IDEB) for public schools was 5.9 for the initial years of elementary education and 4.5 for the final years.

=== Technical and higher education ===
The Centro de Educação Tecnológica Edmundo Macedo Soares (CET), maintained by the CSN Foundation, opened in April 1961. It teaches grades 6 through 9, secondary education and technical courses.

A federal technical school opened in Congonhas on 13 March 2006 as a decentralized unit of CEFET Ouro Preto. It became a campus of the Federal Institute of Minas Gerais (IFMG) when the federal institute system was reorganized in 2008. The campus teaches technical courses in building construction, mechanics and mining. Undergraduate programs include production engineering, mechanical engineering, physics, and Portuguese and English language teaching.

A local support center for the Universidade Aberta do Brasil distance-learning system was approved in 2023. It began enrolling students in 2024, including for a tuition-free chemistry teaching degree offered by the Federal University of Juiz de Fora.

== Health ==
Residents receive routine care through primary health units in the municipal seat, outlying neighborhoods, Alto Maranhão, Lobo Leite and rural communities. Family Health teams offer medical and nursing care, vaccination, prenatal care, dentistry and follow-up for chronic illnesses.

Patients who need consultations, examinations or treatment unavailable in Congonhas can be referred to hospitals and specialist centers elsewhere in Minas Gerais. The municipal Treatment Outside the Municipality program, known as TFD, arranges transportation for these journeys.

=== Hospital and emergency care ===
Hospital Bom Jesus is the main general hospital in Congonhas and receives patients from the surrounding health microrregion. It is classified within the regional emergency network as an open-door general hospital and a maternity hospital for pregnancies of usual risk. The hospital has 89 beds, 56 of them reserved for patients of the SUS. Its wards include general medicine, surgery, orthopedics, obstetrics and pediatrics, along with a ten-bed adult intensive care unit.

A UPA 24h treats urgent cases that do not require immediate hospital admission. Ambulance response is handled through SAMU 192. Its Congonhas base has a basic-support ambulance and an advanced-support ambulance, each operating around the clock.

=== Mental health ===
Mental-health care is organized through community services for adults, children and adolescents. CAPS II treats adults with severe or persistent mental disorders, while CAPS IJ works with children and adolescents. CAPS AD treats disorders related to alcohol and other drugs and has operated around the clock since November 2025.

=== Regional care and health indicators ===
Congonhas forms a health microrregion within the Centro Sul health macroregion of Minas Gerais. Hospital Bom Jesus handles much of the general hospital care for the microrregion, while patients needing more specialized treatment may be referred to larger centers elsewhere in the region.

The infant mortality rate was 12.2 deaths before the age of one per 1,000 live births in 2025.

== Transportation ==
=== Roads and urban mobility ===
BR-040 is the principal highway through Congonhas. It runs north toward Belo Horizonte, about 78 km (48 mi) from the municipal seat, and south through Conselheiro Lafaiete and Barbacena toward Juiz de Fora. The Belo Horizonte–Juiz de Fora section has been managed by EPR Via Mineira since August 2024 under a 30-year federal concession.

The concession includes widening about 10 km (6.2 mi) of BR-040 through Congonhas, between km 602 near Pires and km 612 near the entrance to the town. Preparatory work was underway in 2026, including construction connected with a weigh-in-motion system around km 606 and 607.

MG-030 crosses the municipality through Lobo Leite and connects the district with the BR-040 corridor. MGC-383 runs south from the Congonhas area through São Brás do Suaçuí toward Entre Rios de Minas.

Heavy mine traffic shares these roads with buses and local vehicles. The steep terrain, railway crossings and BR-040 leave relatively few routes between some parts of the town, concentrating traffic along a limited set of corridors. Trucks serving the mining industry add heavy freight traffic to BR-040 and roads around the mines.

=== Rail ===
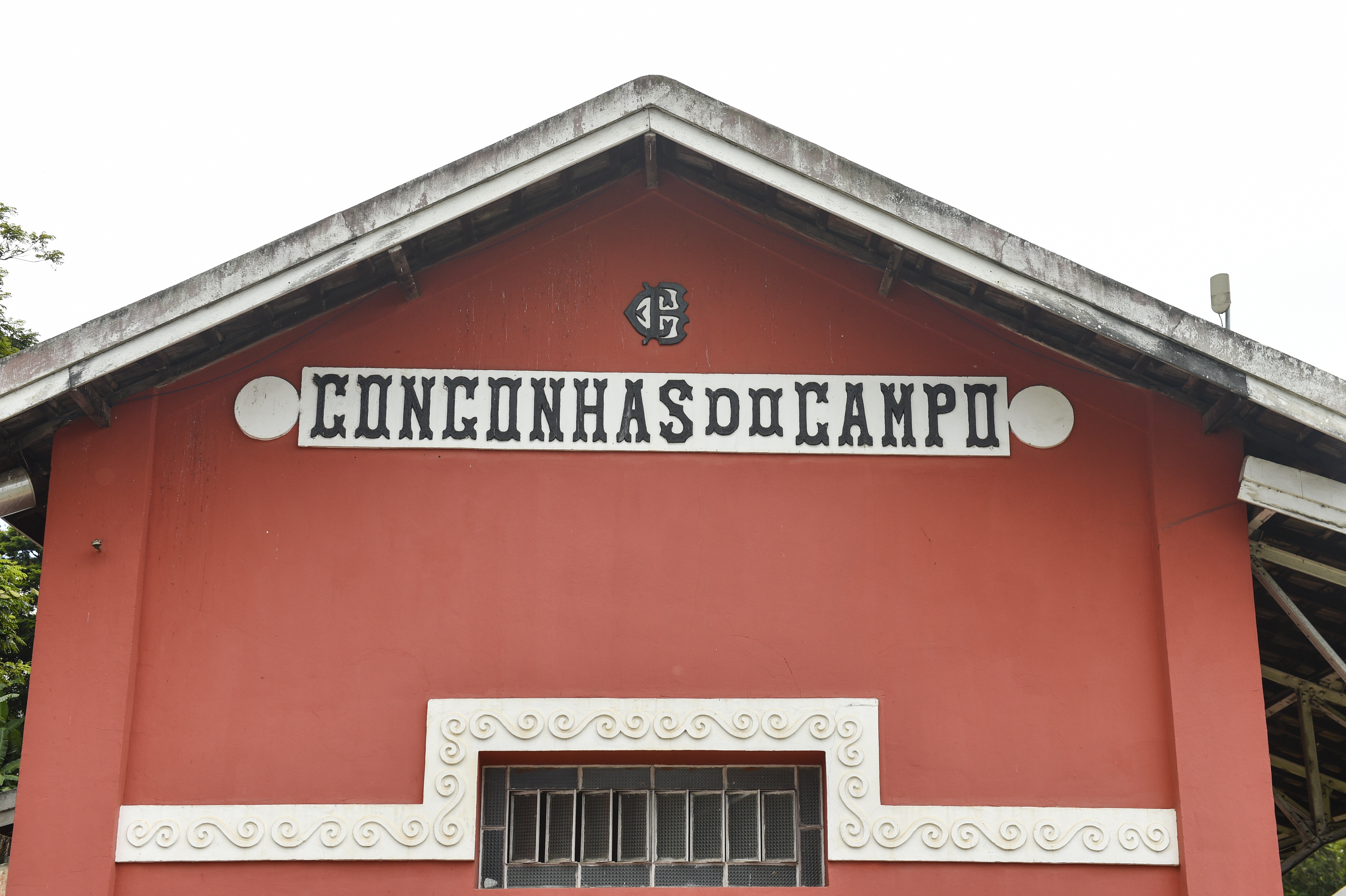
Congonhas do Campo railway station, opened in 1914

Passenger trains no longer serve Congonhas, but the railway remains heavily used for freight. The tracks through the municipal seat belong to the network operated by MRS Logística, which carries freight across Minas Gerais, Rio de Janeiro and São Paulo.

Iron ore is one of the principal cargos carried through the municipality. Ore from the Casa de Pedra complex is loaded onto MRS trains for transport to the Port of Itaguaí in Rio de Janeiro state, while Vale also uses rail for its mining operations in the area.

The line passes through built-up parts of Congonhas and crosses local streets at grade. The renewed MRS concession includes improvements to railway crossings and a pedestrian footbridge in the municipality. A proposal to restore passenger trains between Congonhas and Conselheiro Lafaiete was under preliminary discussion in August 2026.

=== Public transportation ===
Municipal buses run through the urban area and to Alto Maranhão, Lobo Leite and other outlying communities. Routes and fares are set by the municipality.

Intercity buses use the Terminal Rodoviário de Congonhas on Avenida Mauá. Direct services connect the town with Belo Horizonte, Conselheiro Lafaiete, Ouro Branco and São João del-Rei. Longer-distance coaches also run directly to São Paulo, using the Tietê Bus Terminal, and to Rio de Janeiro, using the Novo Rio Bus Terminal.

=== Air access ===
Congonhas has no public passenger airport. Scheduled air passengers generally reach the region through Belo Horizonte International Airport at Confins. Congonhas is connected with the Belo Horizonte area by BR-040, with the municipal seat about 78 km (48 mi) from central Belo Horizonte.

== Public services and communications ==
Most homes in Congonhas receive drinking water through the public distribution network. In the 2022 census, 91 percent of residents used the general network as their main water supply, while smaller numbers relied on wells or other sources. Companhia de Saneamento de Minas Gerais (Copasa) operates the main public water and sewer systems.

Public sewer service reached 67.9 percent of residents in 2024. About 60 percent of the sewage generated in the municipality was collected, but no treatment of the collected sewage was recorded that year. Congonhas has since been expanding its sewer network. Collector sewers and interceptors were under construction in neighborhoods across the municipality by July 2025. A second stage was planned to add pumping stations, pressure mains and a wastewater treatment plant, with construction of that stage expected to begin in 2026.

Household waste collection reached 99.2 percent of residents in the 2022 census. Congonhas, Conselheiro Lafaiete and Ouro Branco jointly maintain the Ecotres regional sanitary landfill system. Collected household waste is weighed before disposal in lined landfill cells, where it is compacted and covered.

Electricity is distributed by Cemig. Free municipal Wi-Fi had reached public buildings and spaces in the municipal seat, Alto Maranhão, Lobo Leite and other outlying communities by 2024.

Radio broadcasting in the town dates to 19 November 1961, when Rádio Congonhas began operating as an archdiocesan station. The station remained active in 2025. The municipal cultural foundation operates Rádio Educativa FM, while Colonial FM 104.7 broadcasts from a studio in the municipal seat.

== Public safety ==
Congonhas is served by the Military Police and has a Civil Police station. The municipal Civil Guard patrols municipal buildings and public spaces and works with state police and traffic authorities.

A Military Firefighters Corps post has operated in Congonhas since 2017. Before it opened, crews responding to emergencies in the municipality came from Conselheiro Lafaiete.

Steep slopes and waterways through built-up areas leave parts of Congonhas vulnerable to flooding and landslides during prolonged rain. The municipal Civil Defense monitors hillsides, road embankments and river levels during the rainy season.

Mining requires a separate emergency-warning system. Areas within emergency zones around mining structures have sirens, marked escape routes and assembly points. Residents take part in siren tests and evacuation drills. An integrated exercise in April 2026 tested warning systems and the routes used to reach designated meeting points.

== Parks and recreation ==
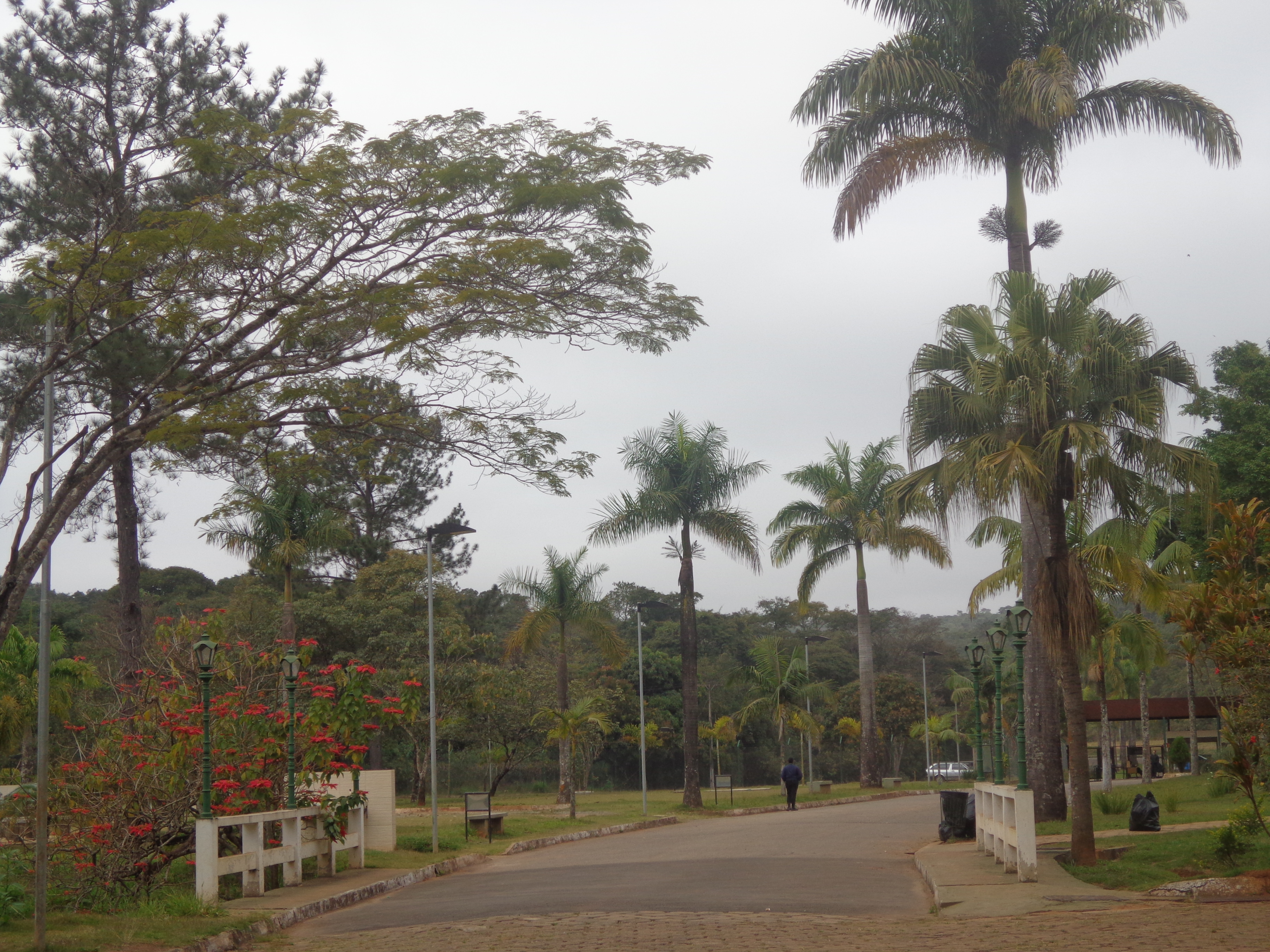
Parque da Cachoeira

The Santo Antônio waterfall lies about 5 km (3.1 mi) from the center of the municipal seat. Parque da Cachoeira has swimming pools fed by running water, a natural pool below the waterfall, sports areas, walking trails, picnic areas and camping space. Beside the recreation area, Parque Natural Municipal da Cachoeira de Santo Antônio protects 85.66 ha (211.7 acres) around the waterfall. It was created as Parque Municipal da Cachoeira in 1983 and received its present name and boundaries in 2015.

Parque Natural da Romaria Hélvio Vitarelli opened beside the Romaria and Museu de Congonhas in December 2025. Trails and wooden decks cross the wooded site and areas planted with native species. The park also has spaces for environmental education and outdoor performances.

=== Sports ===
Congonhas's Torneio de Férias de Futsal reached its 47th edition in 2026, with matches played at the Ginásio Poliesportivo Monteirão.

Mountain-bike races use the steep streets around the sanctuary and trails at Parque da Cachoeira. Congonhas hosted the final round of the UCI Mountain Bike Eliminator World Cup in November 2018, the first time the competition was held in South America. Riders started and finished beside the Sanctuary of Bom Jesus de Matosinhos. The Copa Internacional de Mountain Bike also holds cross-country races at Parque da Cachoeira. Its twentieth Congonhas edition took place there in 2025.

== Notable people ==
- Luís Vieira da Silva, a Catholic priest and professor involved in the Inconfidência Mineira, was born at Soledade in 1735 and baptized in Congonhas do Campo. His extensive library was confiscated after his arrest in 1789.
- Lucas Antônio Monteiro de Barros, Viscount of Congonhas do Campo, was born in Congonhas do Campo in 1767. He served as president of the province of São Paulo, as a senator of the Empire of Brazil, and as president of the Supreme Court of Justice from 1832 to 1842.
- Antonio Américo D'Urzedo, born in Congonhas do Campo in 1786, was a physician, professor and army surgeon. He was a founding member of the Sociedade de Medicina do Rio de Janeiro, later the Academia Nacional de Medicina, and served briefly as its vice president in 1831.
- Silvério Gomes Pimenta, born in Congonhas do Campo in 1840, was a Catholic prelate and writer who became the first archbishop of Mariana. He was elected to chair 19 of the Brazilian Academy of Letters in 1919 and became the first Brazilian prelate admitted to the academy.
- Said Paulo Arges, born in Congonhas in 1905, was a football forward for Atlético Mineiro and Fluminense. He scored 142 goals for Atlético and formed the attacking trio called the Trio Maldito with Mário de Castro and Jairo.
- Zé Arigó, born José Pedro de Freitas on a farm near Congonhas, was a faith healer. During the 1950s and 1960s, patients traveled to Congonhas for what he presented as spiritual surgery while claiming to channel a German doctor called "Dr. Fritz". He was prosecuted for practicing medicine without a license.
- Amaury Lorenzo, born in Congonhas, is an actor and dancer. He played Ramiro in the TV Globo telenovela Terra e Paixão, Chico in Volta por Cima, and Gilmar in Três Graças.

== See also ==
- Sanctuary of Bom Jesus de Matosinhos, World Heritage sanctuary and pilgrimage site in Congonhas
- Twelve Prophets of Aleijadinho, soapstone sculptures on the sanctuary forecourt
- List of municipalities in Minas Gerais
- List of municipalities in Brazil
