= Church of Saint Francis of Assisi (Ouro Preto) =

- Igreja de São Francisco de Assis
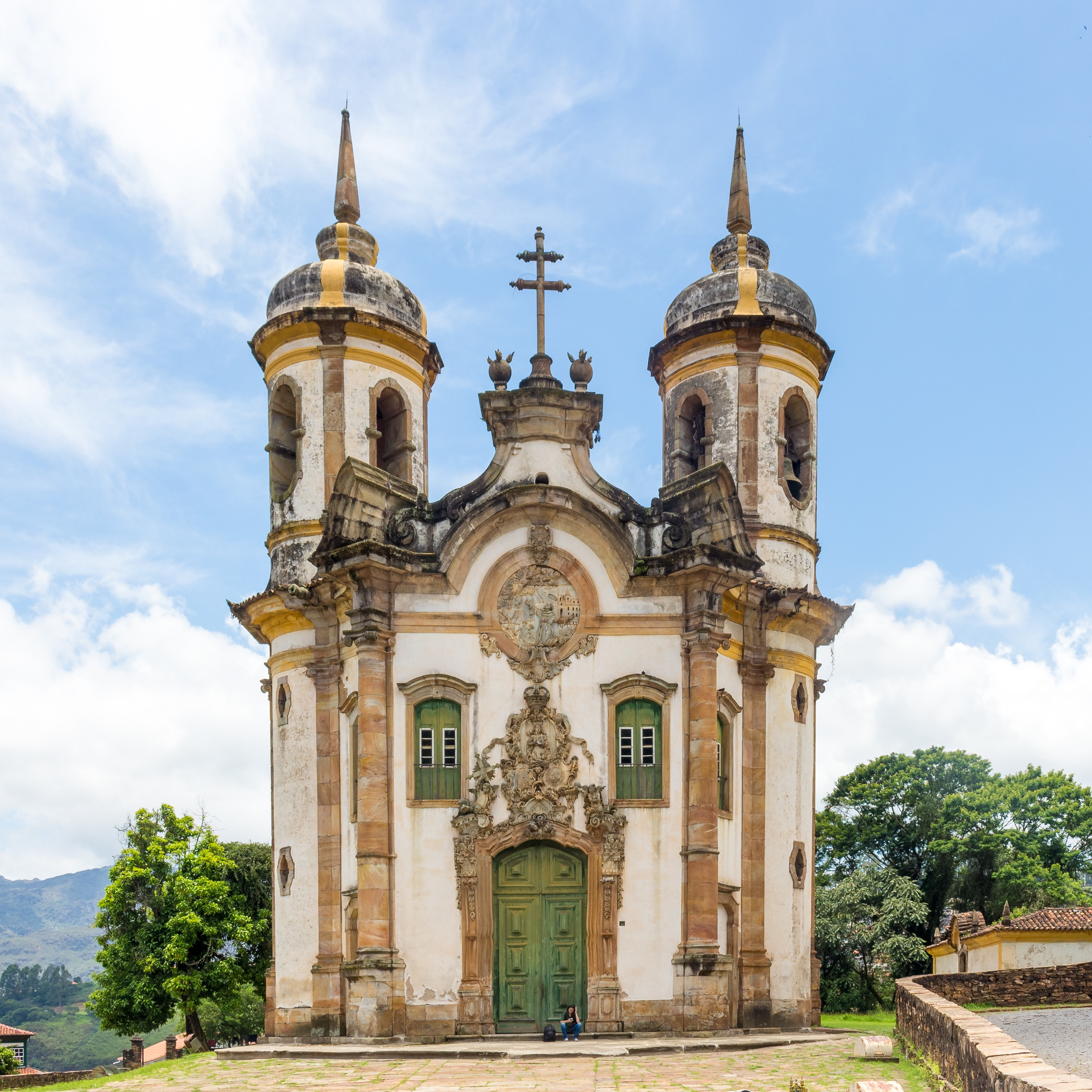
- Church of Saint Francis of Assisi
- 20.386645°S 43.502925°W
- Location: Ouro Preto, Minas Gerais
- Country: Brazil
- Denomination: Roman Catholic Church

Architecture
- Architect: Aleijadinho
- Style: Baroque, rococo
- Years built: 1765-1890

Administration
- Archdiocese: Archdiocese of Mariana

National Historic Heritage of Brazil
- Designated: 1938
- Reference no.: 111

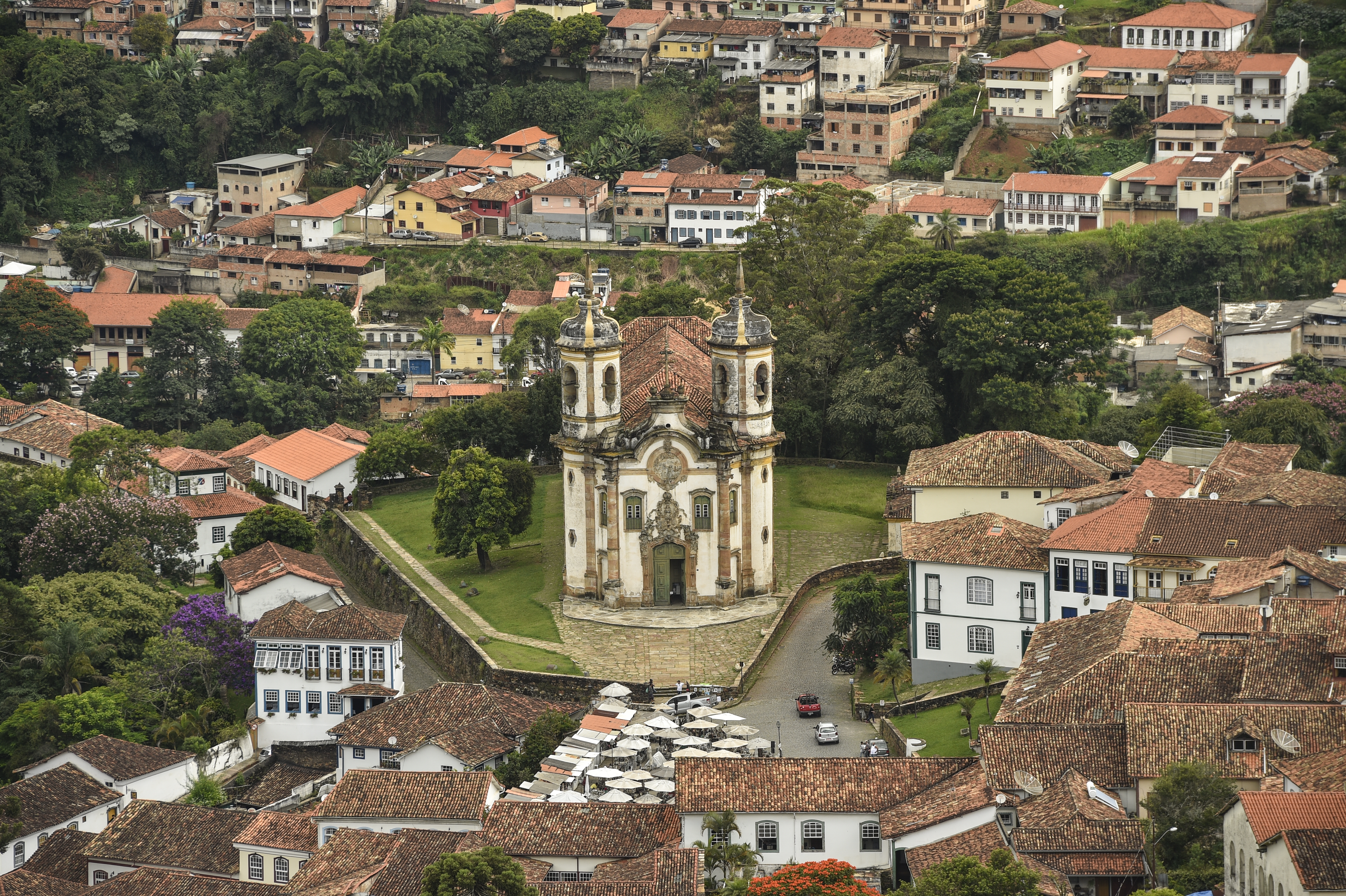
Church of Saint Francis of Assisi and its surrounding area

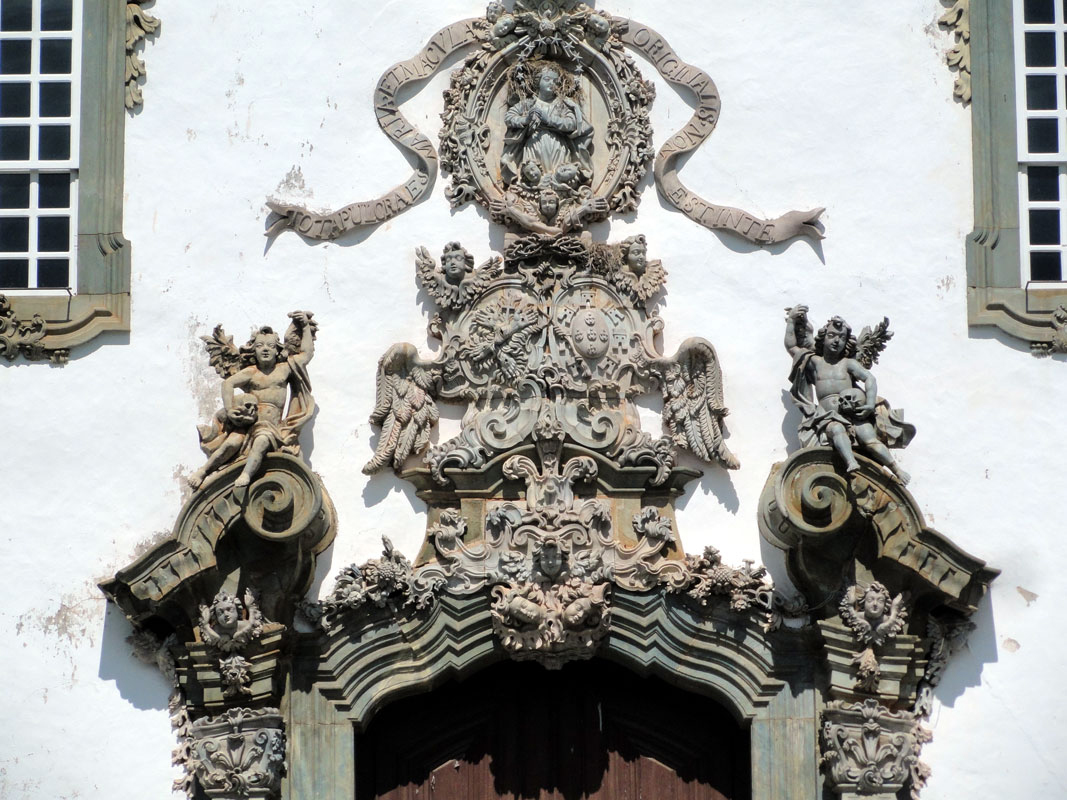
Soapstone frontispiece above main entrance to the church

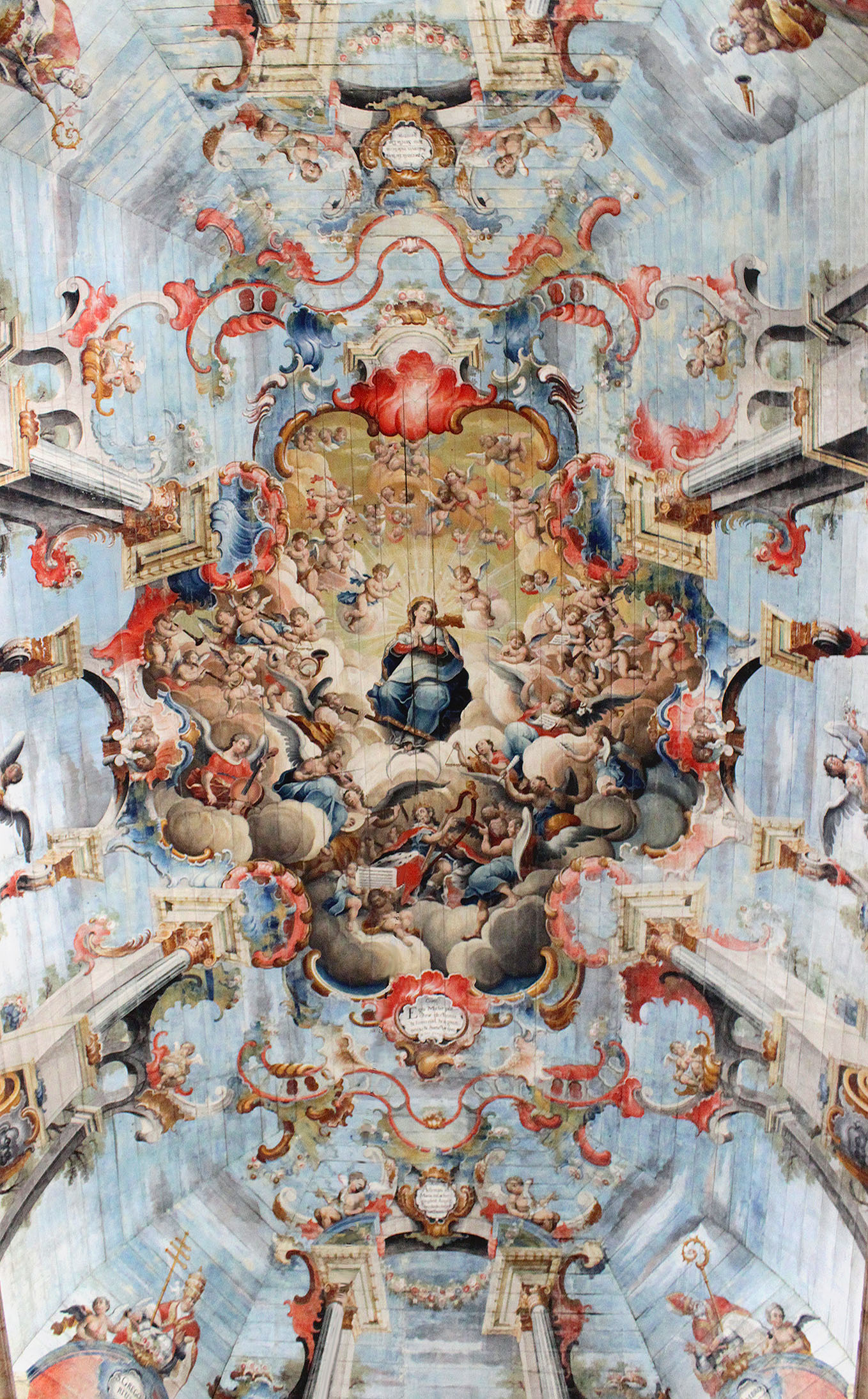
“Glorification of Our Lady Among Musician Angels” by Mestre Ataíde

The Church of Saint Francis of Assisi (Portuguese: Igreja de São Francisco de Assis) is a Rococo Catholic church in Ouro Preto, Brazil. Its erection began in 1766 after a design by the Brazilian architect and sculptor Antônio Francisco Lisboa, otherwise known as Aleijadinho. Lisboa designed both the structure of the church and the carved decorations on the interior, which were only finished towards the end of the 19th century. The circular bell towers and the oculus closed by a relief were original features in religious architecture of that time in Brazil. The façade has a single entrance door under a soapstone frontispiece under a relief depicting Saint Francis receiving the stigmata. The interior is richly decorated with golden woodwork, statues and paintings, and the wooden ceiling displays a painting by Manuel da Costa Ataíde.

The Third Order of São Francisco of Ouro Preto submitted a requested permission to construct the church in 1752 to the Council of Conscience and Orders (Mesa da Consciência e Ordens) in Lisbon. The Council was overwhelmed by requests from Brazil by the 18th century, and permission was only received after 19 years. The Order began construction in 1765 under a two year provisional license. The Council ultimately approved construction of the church in 1771. Due to its architecture and historical significance regarding eighteenth-century gold mining, the church is classified on the UNESCO World Heritage List. It is one of the Seven Wonders of Portuguese Origin in the World.

== Architect ==
Antônio Francisco Lisboa was a Brazilian sculptor and architect in the eighteenth-century. His work primarily consists of Catholic churches and sculptures of religious figures. Born in 1738 as the illegitimate son of Portuguese architect Manuel Francisco Lisboa and an African slave, Lisboa grew up learning architecture and sculpting from his father. Lisboa is commonly known as Aleijadinho, or little cripple, as a description of a condition resulting from syphilis. Rodrigo Bretas describes this condition in his book, Passos da Paixão: O Aleijadinho.

Antonio Francisco [Lisboa] came to lose all of his toes. Consequently, he atrophied and curved, and even some of his fingers fell off leaving him with only the thumbs and forefingers and practically devoid of movement. The excruciating pains he frequently felt in his fingers and the sourness of his choleric temper led him to the paroxysm of cutting off his fingers using the chisel he worked with.

While skilled in both sculpture and architecture, Lisboa was kept out of the circles of local artisans due to his birth status. However, his profession combined with his father's race placed Lisboa's social status significantly above other non-white individuals, as race was highly performative and largely based on visual categorization. His mixed-race status and ability to claim a white father, along with his profession as an artisan, allowed Lisboa to distance himself from the slaves who built his churches without fully claiming whiteness. Lisboa's volume of work is incredibly large, includes this site, and also those such as Congonhas do Campo and the Twelve Prophets (Twelve Prophets of Aleijadinho) with many other doors, alters, facades, and chapels in the region.

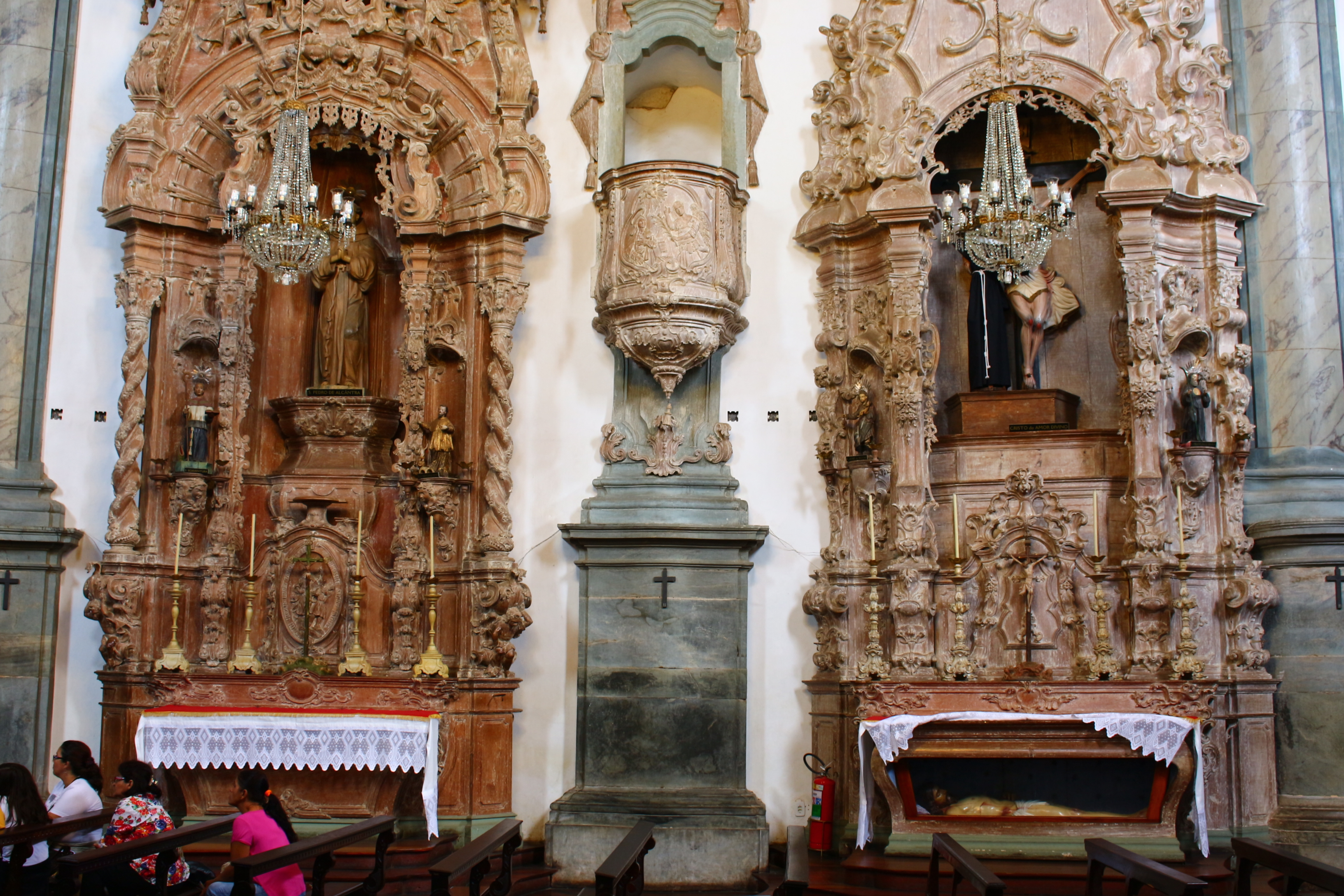
Sculptures on the side of the main chapel

== Art and architecture ==
Both Lisboa and Minas Gerais are known for their Rococo architecture. This architectural style is highly ornate and commonly found in churches built in the eighteenth century, with varying stylistic differences depending on influence of different European countries. Along with these elaborately detailed structures are often baroque paintings and sculptures. As explained by Monika Kaup (Ph.D., Ruhr University, 1991), "the delirious baroque effect is achieved by letting ornamentation run riot on interior walls, retablos, and facades."

The Church of Saint Francis of Assisi adheres to common Rococo elements, as Lisboa included gilded carvings and high-reliefs throughout the chapel and marked the exterior with the façade and soapstone frontispiece. As is consistent with the architectural style, this church also includes colonial Rococo paintings by Mestre Ataíde. Of the paintings, Ataíde’s most notable work is on the ceiling of the chapel. It is titled “Glorification of Our Lady Among Musician Angels” and depicts Mary surrounded by angels with various musical instruments. On the outer edges of the painting are prominent bishops and saints between large columns.

== Historical significance ==
The Church of São Francisco de Assis is located in the city of Ouro Preto in the state of Minas Gerais, Brazil. Ouro Preto is a United Nations Educational, Scientific, and Cultural Organization (UNESCO) World Heritage Site and cited as an example of baroque architecture. This well-preserved colonial Portuguese architecture, including that of the Church of St. Francis of Assisi and the artwork inside of the church, are examples of the baroque revival style (also known as rococo or late baroque).

Ouro Preto has a rich history as a major mining town in colonial Brazil, which played an important role in the colonial economy. The architectural style, with its intricate designs and heavy use of gold, draws from the city’s history and wealth gained from gold mining in the eighteenth century. As art historian Robert C. Smith notes, Brazil did not have the same extent of indigenous influence on architecture as other Latin American countries. Instead Brazilian colonial architecture, particularly in Minas Gerais, is significantly more Portuguese in stylistic influence than that of a synthetic Indigenous-European style. This engages with the conversation about the implications of colonizer influence as evident through colonial architecture. This style of architecture, and its connection to the colonial economy, was supported by the Church.

As the ethnomusicologist Suzel Ana Reily argues,

"In Latin America...the realm of the baroque was most spectacularly represented within the religious sphere. Indeed the baroque ideals were greatly encouraged by the church, particularly through the activities of the Jesuits (Barbosa 1978, 10) in an effort to curtail the expansion of Protestantism in the Iberian colonial strongholds. With the discovery of gold in what is now the state of Minas Gerais in the late 17th century, there was also considerable wealth, which significantly enhanced the baroque orientation towards ostentation. Much of this wealth was invested in the construction and decoration of churches as well as in the production of grand religious festivals with magnificent processions and ceremonious sung masses."

== Holy Week celebrations ==
The church in former mining towns in southern Brazil is the center of Holy Week celebrations. As social anthropologist Suzel Ana Reily (Ph.D., University of São Paulo) notes in her research on the baroque era and local identity:

"In Campanha, as in other former mining towns in the region such as Ouro Preto, São João del-Rey, Prados, Lavras, Baependi and a number of others, Holy Week is the main event on the annual religious calendar. It is enacted following a highly theatrical, ‘baroque’ template that developed during the colonial period and it is propelled by a choral repertoire that centers upon the works of major colonial composers...Through the festivities the population of the town is transported back to the gold mining era, a glorious age of considerable wealth, and the power of these experiences has been central in defining local identity in terms of the legacy of gold."

Reily shows how this convergence of historical consciousness and religiosity, through processions and celebration, renews local visions of economic prosperity. Holy Week celebrations continue through today, with thousands of people participating in the processions, music, and elaborate decoration of the city.

== See also ==
- 18th-century Western domes
