= Manoel da Costa Ataíde =

Brazilian painter and sculptor

- Born: October 18, 1762; Mariana, Minas Gerais, Colonial Brazil, Portuguese Empire
- Died: February 2, 1830 (aged 67); Mariana, Minas Gerais, Empire of Brazil
- Known for: Painting and Sculpture
- Movement: Baroque and Rococo

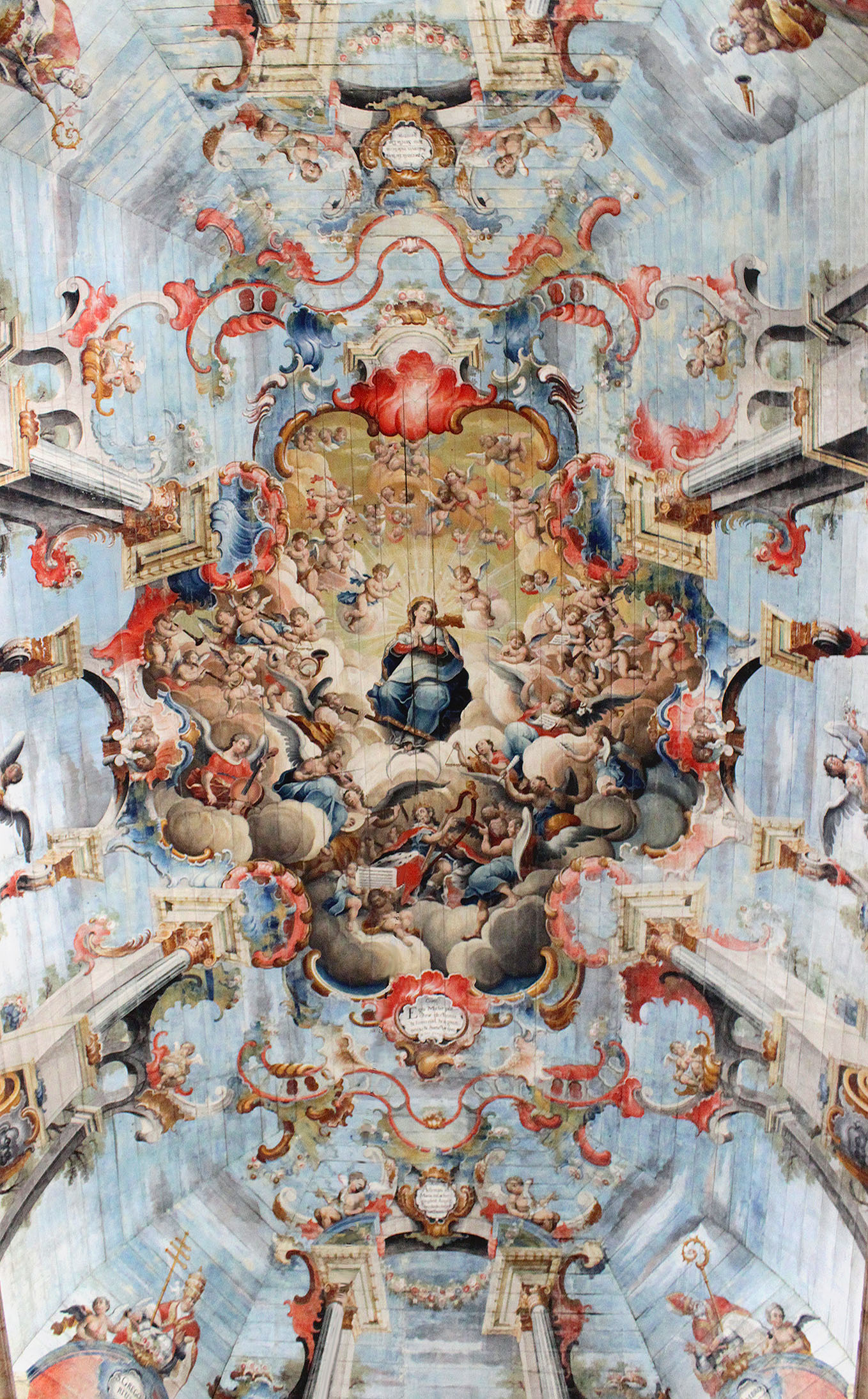
Ceiling of the Church of Saint Francis of Assisi in Ouro Preto

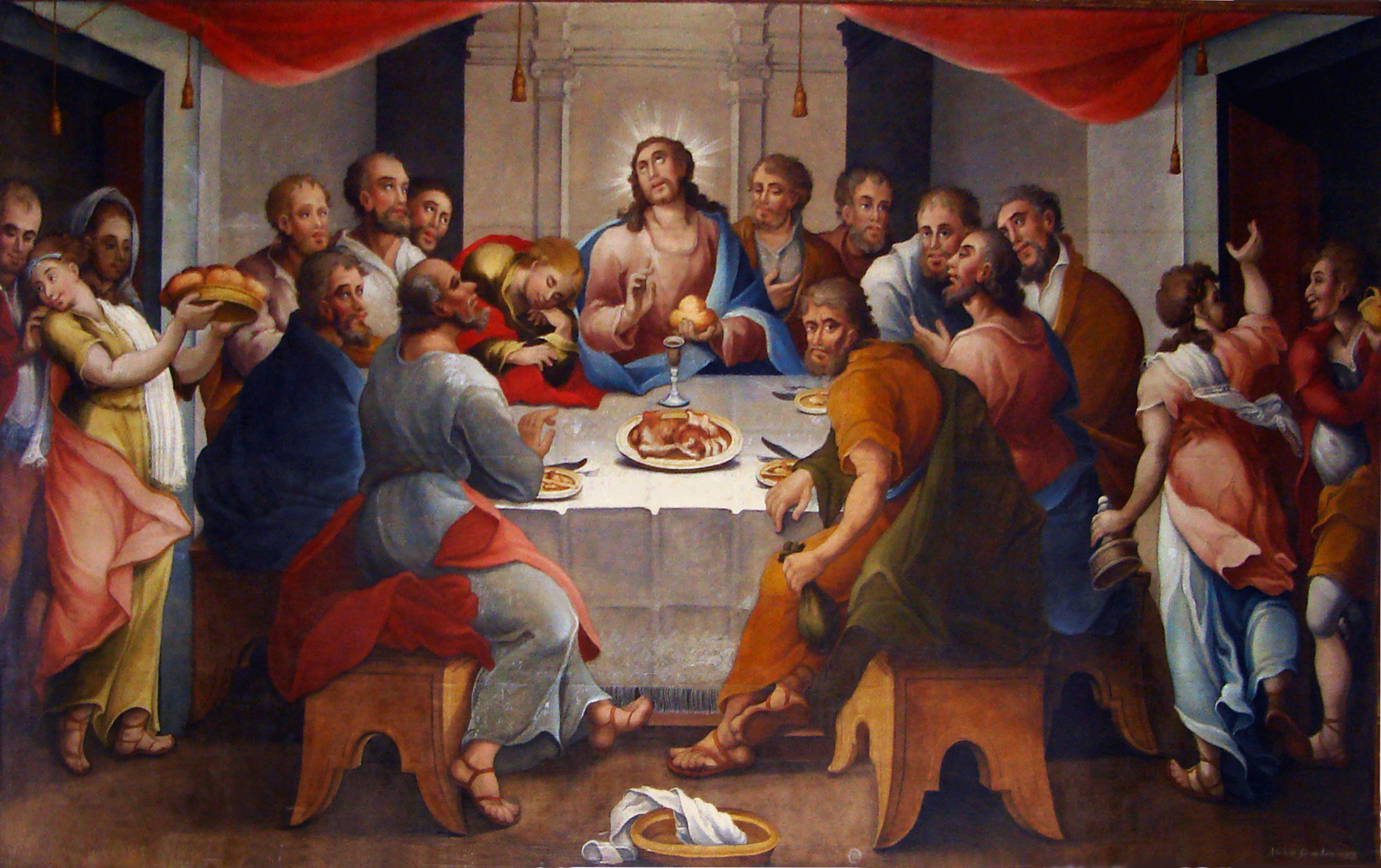
The Last Supper, Ataíde's only easel work. Our Lady Mother of Men Church

Manoel da Costa Ataíde, better known as Mestre Ataíde (18 October 1762 – 2 February 1830), was a Brazilian painter, sculptor, gilder and teacher.

An important artist of the baroque-rococo school in Minas Gerais, Ataíde had a major influence on painting in the region, with many students and followers. His method of composition, particularly in perspective works on church ceilings, continued to be used until the middle of the nineteenth century. Contemporary documents often refer to him as a teacher of painting. In 1818 Ataíde tried without success to obtain official permission to found an art school in Mariana, his home town. He owned technical manuals and theoretical tracts such as Andrea Pozzo's "Perspectivae Pictorum Architectorum" from which he must have studied technique.

His art is characterised by the use of bright colours, especially blue.

He was a contemporary and colleague of Antônio Francisco Lisboa (Aleijadinho). In the period 1781 to 1818 he completed and gilded Aleijadinho's images for the Sanctuary of Bom Jesus de Matosinhos in Congonhas and the Church of Saint Francis of Assisi in Ouro Preto.

== Life ==
Manoel da Costa Ataíde was one of four children of a Portuguese Captain, Luis da Costa Ataíde, originally from Santa Cruz de Alvaida, a small village in the Vila Real region of north central Portugal. His mother was Maria Barbosa de Abreu, also presumably of Portuguese origin. The painter was born in the parish of Mariana and baptized on 18 October 1762 in the town's cathedral. The Ataíde family was established but of comparatively modest means. Manoel was 40 years old when his father died in 1802: an inventory at the time of death lists the father's principal possessions as a smallholding planted with maize, a small pig rearing facility and two houses in Mariana. The inventory also lists, among Luis da Costa Ataíde's possessions, three captive and two escaped slaves.

=== Race ===
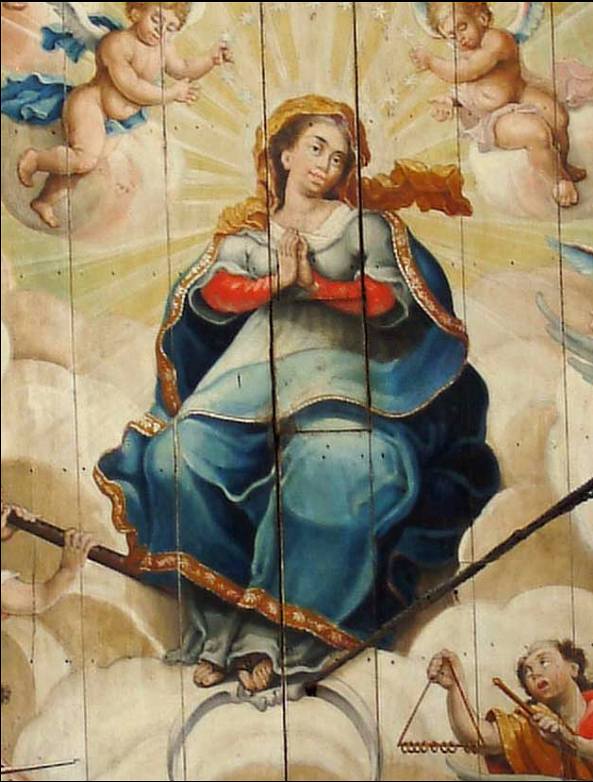
Detail of the Assumption of the Virgin, in the Church of São Francisco of Ouro Preto.

Many critics have celebrated Ataíde's originality in reflecting in his paintings the physical characteristics and facial features of Brazil's mestiço population, most famously in his depiction of the Virgin in the Igreja de Sao Francisco (see image). Ataíde's personal life demonstrates all the complexity of early nineteenth century Brazilian society where race was constantly specified and policed, where slavery was endemic at all levels of society and yet affective relations between people of different races were tolerated and socially structured.

Ataíde remained unmarried through his life but in 1808 the age of 46 began a relationship with the then 20 year old Maria do Carmo Raimundo da Silva. The couple went on to have six children together, four of whom survived to adulthood. While Ataide was classified as white, Maria was classified in church documents as "parda forra" (a free, mixed race person), as were her children with Ataíde. Though it is not known if Ataíde lived with Maria, she was openly recognised as his "concubine." Similarly, Ataíde fully and publicly recognised his children: they were baptized with godparents of high status in Mariana society, who were connected to Ataíde professionally. The children were his principal heirs in his will.

Ataíde was a member of religious brotherhoods bringing together different races. At the same time, it is recorded that at the age of 49 he owned three black slaves, Pedro, aged 44, Maria aged 40 and Victorino aged 13. He paid the full costs of religious education and participation for his slaves - seen as the mark of a generous slave owner.

== Works ==
- Painting of the chapel of Nossa Senhora da Glória of 1742 in Ressaca, Carandai, Minas Gerais.
- Paintings in the Church of Saint Francis of Assisi in Ouro Preto carried out between 1801 and 1812. The "glorification of the Virgin", painted on wood in the roof of the main nave, his best known work.
- Interior of the presbytery of the Church of St. Anthony in Santa Barbara, 1806;
- Details inside the Church of Our Lady of Mount Carmel, in Ouro Preto, 1813.
- "The Last Supper" in the college of Caraça, 1828;
- Ceiling of the presbytery of the Church of St Anthony in Itaverava, 1811;
- Ceiling of the presbytery of the Church of Our Lady of the Rosary, in Mariana, 1823.
