= Basic Education Development Index =

Brazilian public education quality index

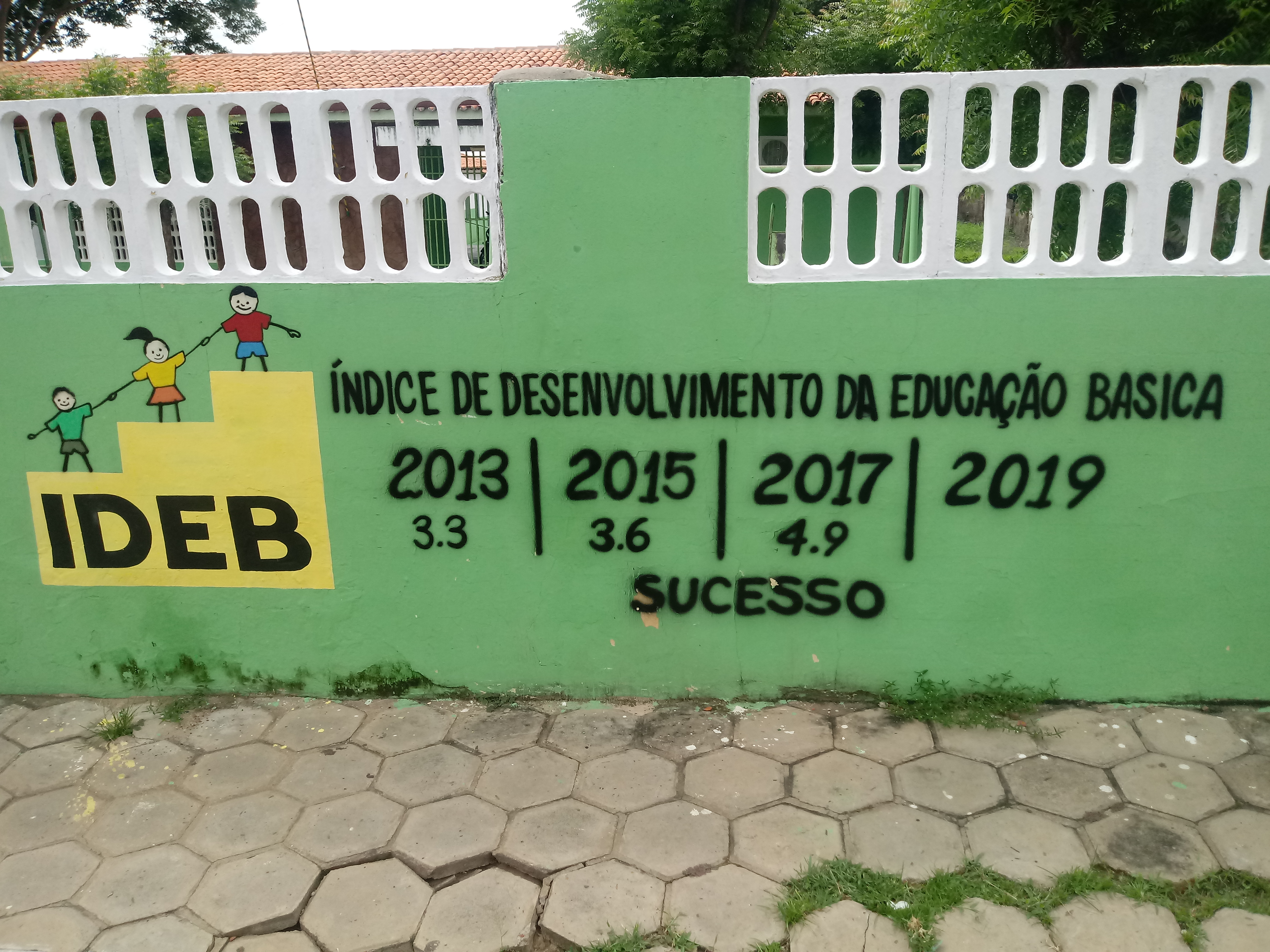
Image about the Basic Education Development Index on a wall at a school in Campo Maior, Piauí.

The Basic Education Development Index (Portuguese: Índice de Desenvolvimento da Educação Básica; IDEB) is an indicator created by the Brazilian federal government to measure the quality of education in public schools. The latest IDEB, conducted in 2023, reports a score of 6.0 for Brazil in the early years, 5.0 in the later years of primary education, and 4.3 in secondary education.

== Data ==
The Ideb was created in 2007 by the National Institute for Educational Studies and Research Anísio Teixeira (INEP) as part of the Education Development Plan to measure the quality of education across the country.

=== Calculation ===
The index is calculated based on school performance (promotion and dropout rates) in the Basic Education Assessment System (SAEB) and the National Assessment of School Achievement (ANRESC).

=== Target ===
The Ideb is measured every two years and presented on a scale from zero to ten. The goal is to reach a score of 6, the same result achieved by Organisation for Economic Co-operation and Development (OECD) countries when applying the Ideb methodology to their educational outcomes. A score of 6.0 was achieved by countries ranked among the top 20 worldwide. More specifically, the federal government's goal was for the national average in education to be 6 or higher by 2022. In total, IDEB assigns scores to 46,000 public schools across the country and, based on the results, identifies schools needing investment and monitors performance. A school is considered to be of good quality if it scores 6 or higher. Tools are available for the public to access Ideb scores of schools by region and state.

=== Disclosure ===
Published every two years, IDEB does not have a fixed release date. Each year it is released on a different date.

- 2007 – June 2008;
- 2009 – July 2010;
- 2011 – 14 August 2012;
- 2013 – 5 September 2014;
- 2015 – 8 September 2016;
- 2017 – 3 September 2018;
- 2019 – 15 September 2020.
