= Sanctuary of Bom Jesus de Matosinhos =

Roman Catholic basilica in Congonhas, Minas Gerais, Brazil

- Santuário do Bom Jesus de Matosinhos
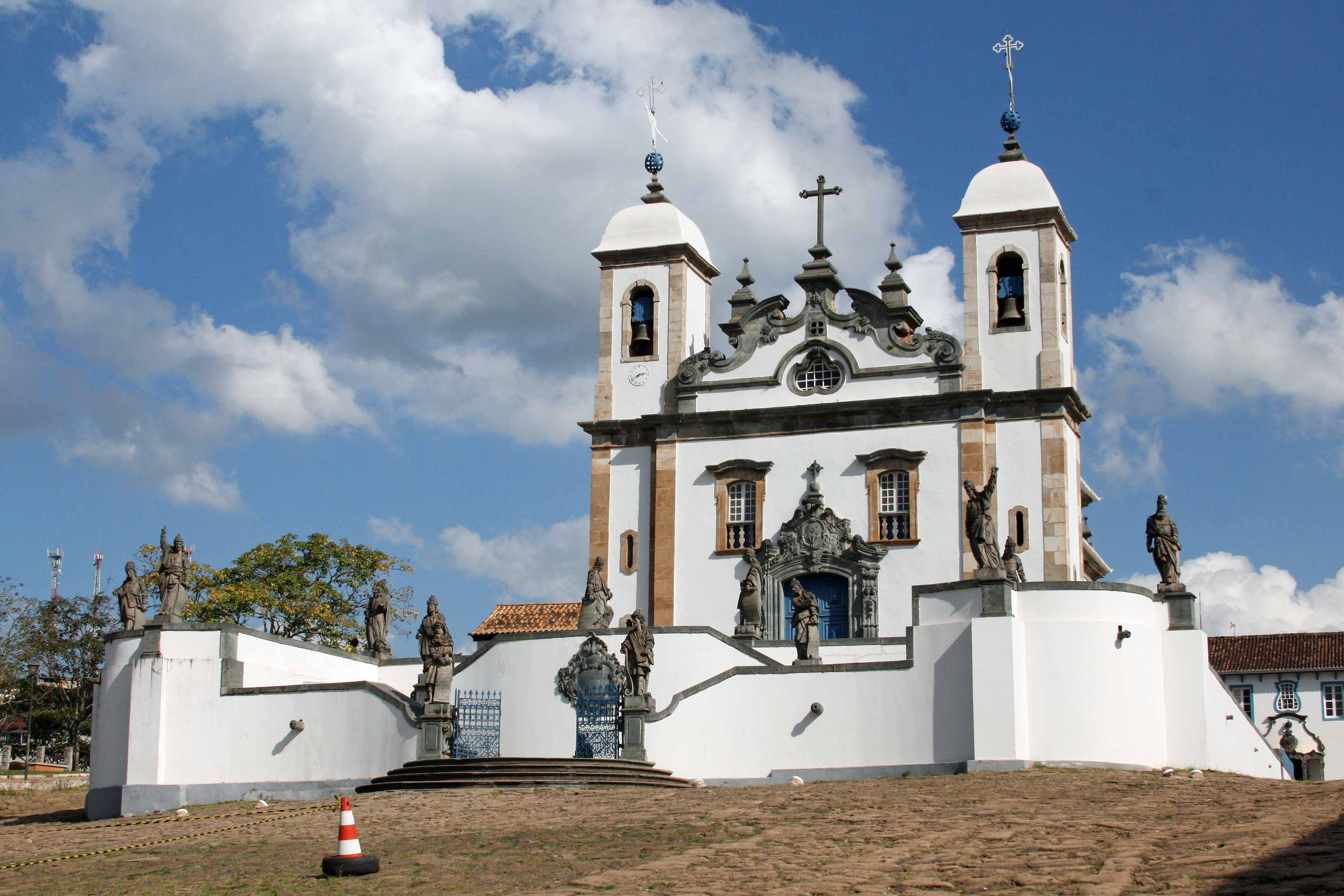
- Façade of the Sanctuary of Bom Jesus de Matosinhos

- Location of the Sanctuary of Bom Jesus de Matosinhos in Brazil

Religion
- Affiliation: Catholic
- Rite: Roman Rite
- Ownership: Roman Catholic Archdiocese of Mariana

Location
- Municipality: Congonhas
- State: Minas Gerais
- Country: Brazil
- Interactive map of Sanctuary of Bom Jesus de Matosinhos
- Coordinates: 20.507778°S 43.860694°W

Architecture
- Style: Baroque
- UNESCO World Heritage Site
- Official name: Sanctuary of Bom Jesus do Congonhas
- Criteria: Cultural: (i)(iv)
- Designated: 1985 (9th session)
- Reference no.: 334
- Buffer zone: 8.77 ha (21.7 acres)

National Historic Heritage of Brazil
- Designated: 1939

Plan of the sanctuary

The Sanctuary of Bom Jesus de Matosinhos (Portuguese: Santuário do Bom Jesus de Matosinhos) is an 18th-century Roman Catholic basilica in Congonhas, Minas Gerais, Brazil. It was designed in the Baroque style with an Italian-inspired Rococo interior. The basilica is noted for its grand outdoor stairway with statues of Old Testament prophets. The interior has seven side chapels which illustrate the Stations of the Cross; each has a polychrome sculpture made by the artist Aleijadinho (b. 1730 or 1738 – 1814) and his assistants. They are considered masterpieces of an original, moving, and expressive form of Baroque art. The basilica was listed as a historic structure by the National Institute of Historic and Artistic Heritage (IPHAN) in 1939, and designated it as a UNESCO World Heritage Site in 1985.

== Location ==
The sanctuary is located on top of the Morro do Maranhão, a bluff that is part of the Serra do Ouro Branco. It is approached by steep, cobbled streets of the historic center of Congonhas.

== Bom Jesus de Matosinhos ==
The Sanctuary of Bom Jesus de Matosinhos is dedicated to Bom Jesus de Matosinhos, an invocation of Jesus related to a polychrome wood sculpture. This sculpture is displayed in Matosinhos, Portugal. People believe that it was created by Nicodemus who knew Jesus in his lifetime. The sculpture was said to be a perfect likeness of Jesus and it is the first depiction of Jesus that arrived in Portugal.

== History ==
The sanctuary was commissioned by Feliciano Mendes. Mendes made a promise to the Bom Jesus de Matosinhos after he recovered from a grave illness in 1757. When Mendes died in 1765, religious services started to be offered by the sanctuary. The sculpture of Bom Jesus at Congonhas do Campo is seen as a powerful vehicle of intercession. It was believed that prayers uttered in front of the sculpture have a good chance of being answered, and it became a famous pilgrimage site with to which people travelled to ask Jesus for help and assistance.

== Structure ==
The plan of the church follows the Portuguese colonial baroque model, and is described as "the largest and most notable architectural and artistic ensemble in the country" by Maria Elisa Carrazzoni. It has a rectangular floor plan, a single nave, a choir over the entrance, and a chancel separated from the nave by a monumental arch. Corridors around the chancel lead to a sacristy at the rear. The façade is also typical of the period, with a central block for the body of the church. A single entrance is adorned with a carved stone frame. The art historian Germain Bazin attributes the design of the elaborate frontispiece to Aleijadinho.

The interior is richly decorated in the Rococo style, consisting of gilded carvings on the altars, statuary, and paintings on the ceilings and walls. The altars of the chancel arch were completed between 1765 and 1769 by Jerônimo Felix Teixeira. They were completed in 1772 by Manuel Rodrigues Coelho, and then gilded and painted by João Carvalhais (altar of Saint Anthony) and Bernardo Pires da Silva (altar of Saint Francis de Paula). João Antunes de Carvalho completed the high altar between 1769 and 1775. Francisco Vieira Servas sculpted two large torch-bearing angels that decorate the chancel in 1778. The four reliquaries are the work of Aleijadinho's workshop, and were painted by Mestre Ataíde. The painting of the chancel ceiling was carried out between 1773 and 1774 by Bernardo Pires da Silva; it depicts the burial of Jesus.

== Protection and management requirements ==
Since the sanctuary was designated an historical site in 1939, the National Institute of Historical and Artistic Heritage (Instituto do Patrimônio Histórico e Artístico Nacional – IPHAN) has worked to protect and conserve it. They aim to preserve the cultural property's significance and the values attributed to the sanctuary.

== Room of Miracles ==
On January 29, 1981, the Room of Miracles was considered a federal heritage site by IPHAN. This is an offering room where devotees donate objects to say thanks for the blessings that they received through Bom Jesus's intercession.

== See also ==
- 18th-century Western domes
