= São Brás do Suaçuí =

Brazilian municipality

Coordinates: 20°37′30″S 43°56′56″W

- Municipality
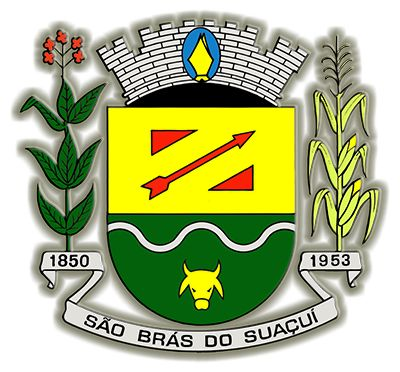
- Coat of arms
- Interactive map of São Brás do Suaçuí
- Country: Brazil
- State: Minas Gerais
- Region: Southeast

Population (2022 Census)
  - Total: 3,989
  - Estimate (2025): 4,161
- Time zone: UTC−3 (BRT)

Location of São Brás do Suaçuí within Minas Gerais

São Brás do Suaçuí is a Brazilian municipality located in the state of Minas Gerais. The city belongs to the mesoregion Metropolitana de Belo Horizonte and to the microregion of Conselheiro Lafaiete. As of 2025, the estimated population was 4,161.

== See also ==
- List of municipalities in Minas Gerais
