= Ouro Branco, Minas Gerais =

Ouro Branco
- Municipality
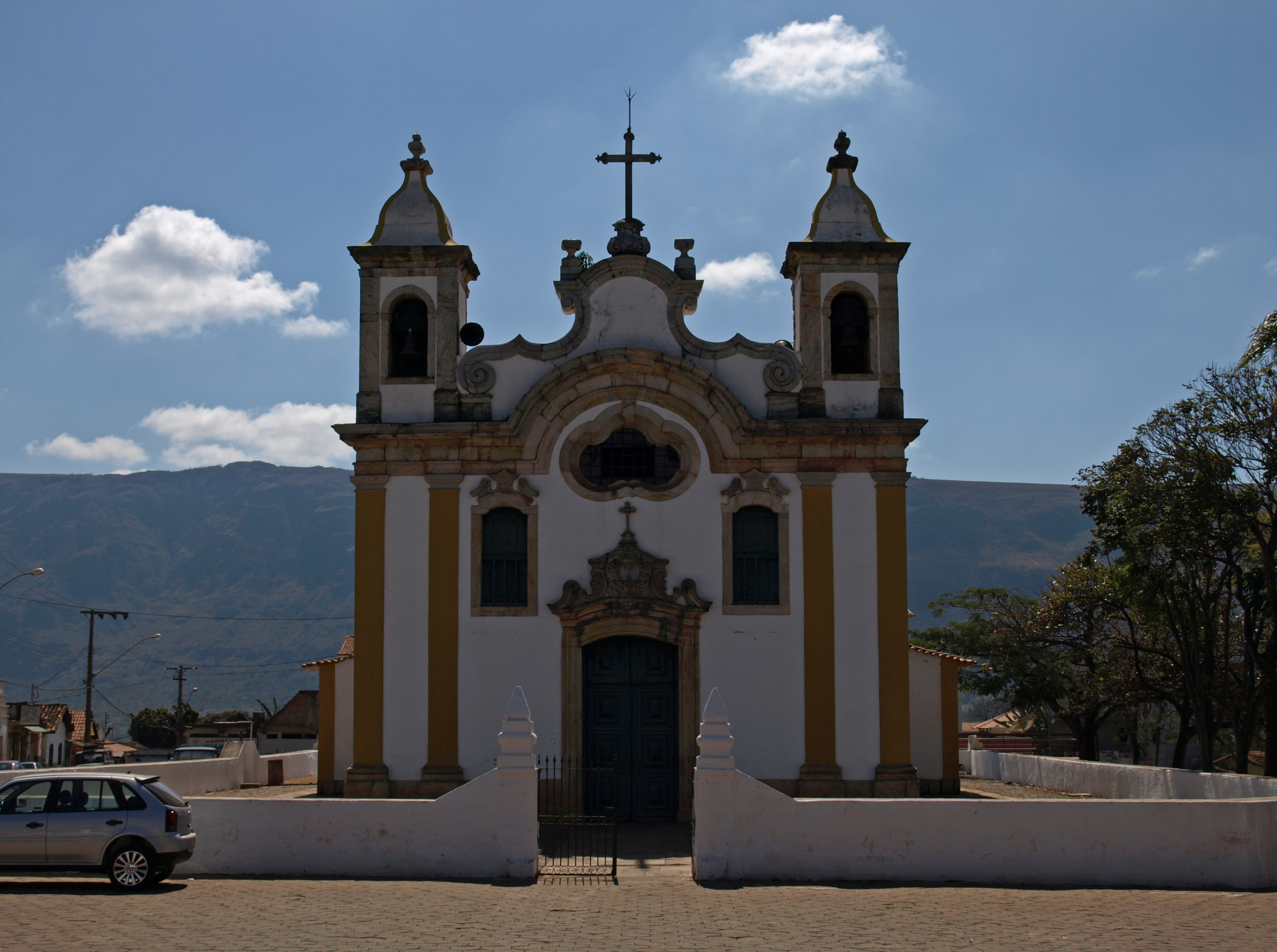

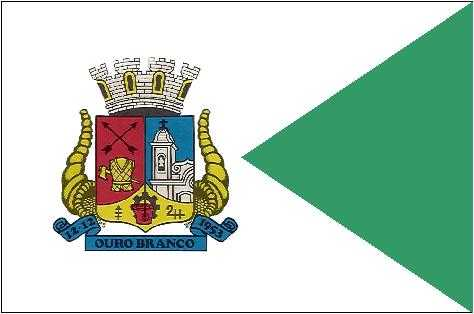
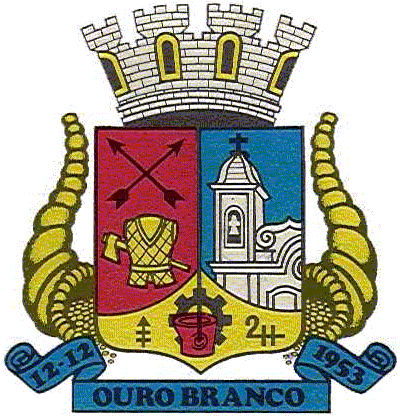
- Flag Coat of arms

- Location of Ouro Branco within Minas Gerais

- Localization of Ouro Branco in Brazil
- Coordinates: 20°31′15″S 43°41′31″W
- Country: Brazil
- Region: Southeast
- State: Minas Gerais

Population (2022 Census)
  - Total: 38,724
  - Estimate (2025): 40,638
- Time zone: UTC−3 (BRT)

Ouro Branco is a Brazilian municipality located in the state of Minas Gerais. The city belongs to the Mesoregion Metropolitana de Belo Horizonte and to the Microregion of Conselheiro Lafaiete. As of 2025, the city has a population of 40,638 inhabitants. The name "Ouro Branco" means "White Gold", as opposed to "Black Gold" - Ouro Preto. The city was an important base on the transportation route from the mines of Minas Gerais to the coast.

== See also ==
- List of municipalities in Minas Gerais
