= Ouro Preto =

- Municipality
- Municipality of Ouro Preto
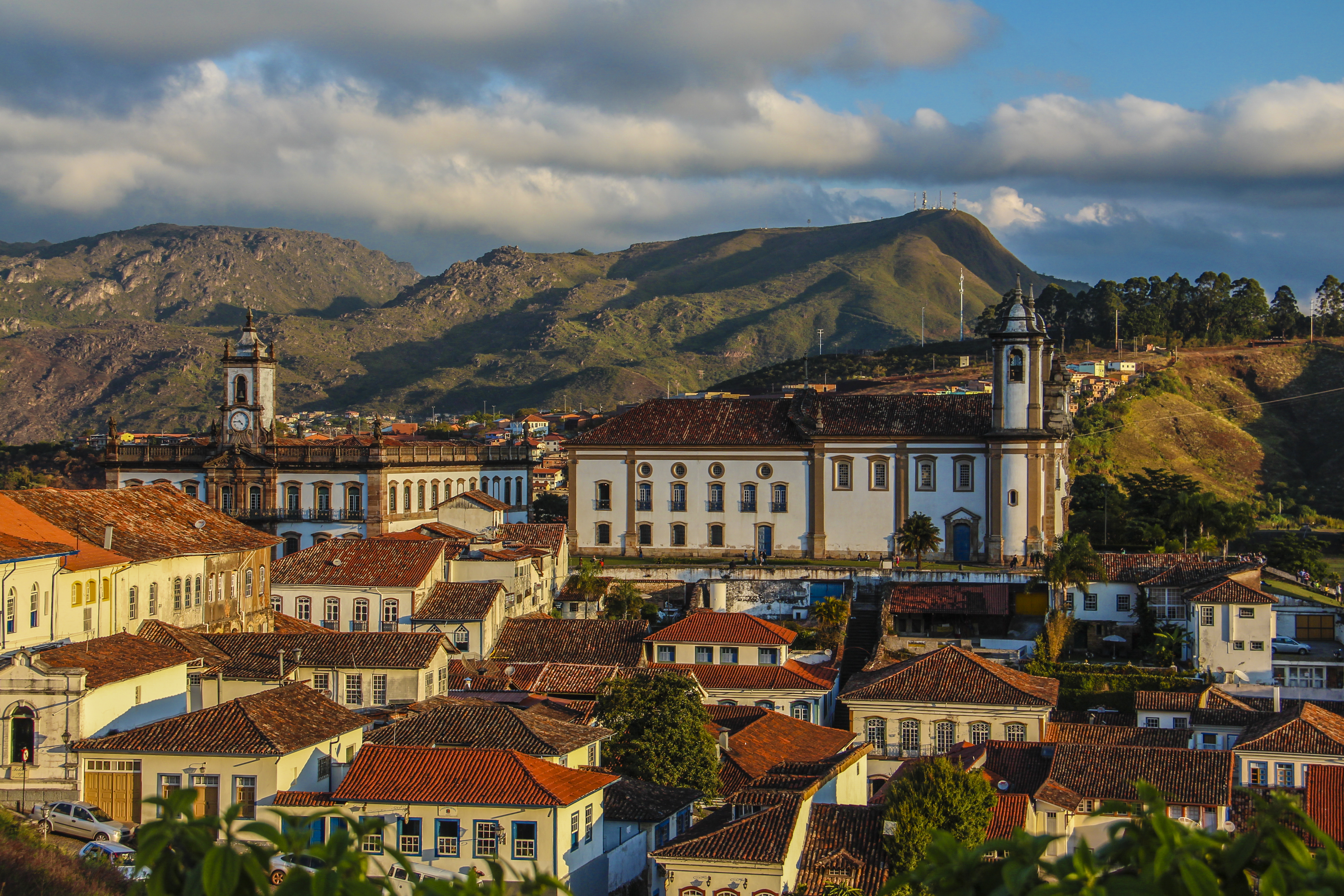
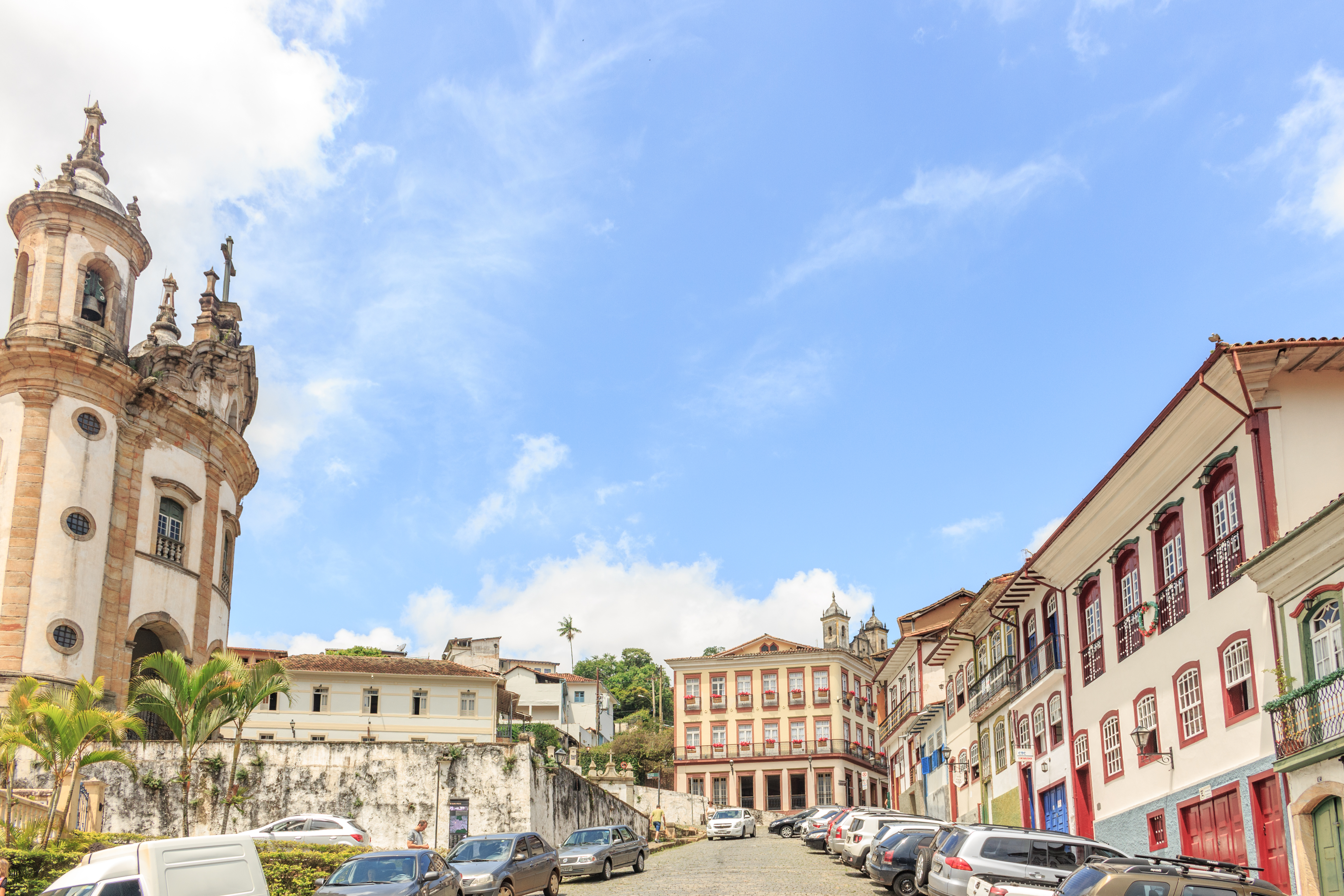
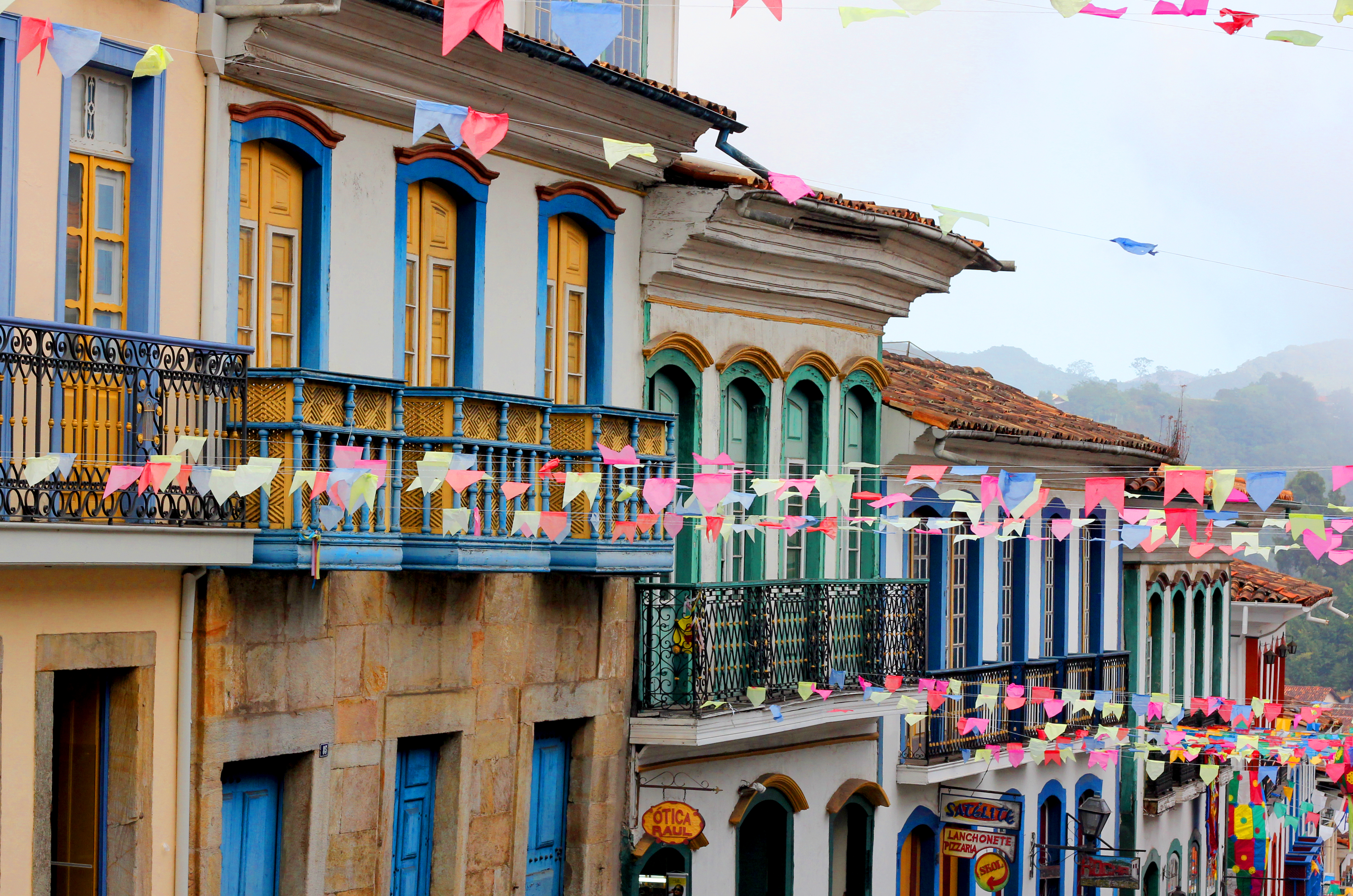
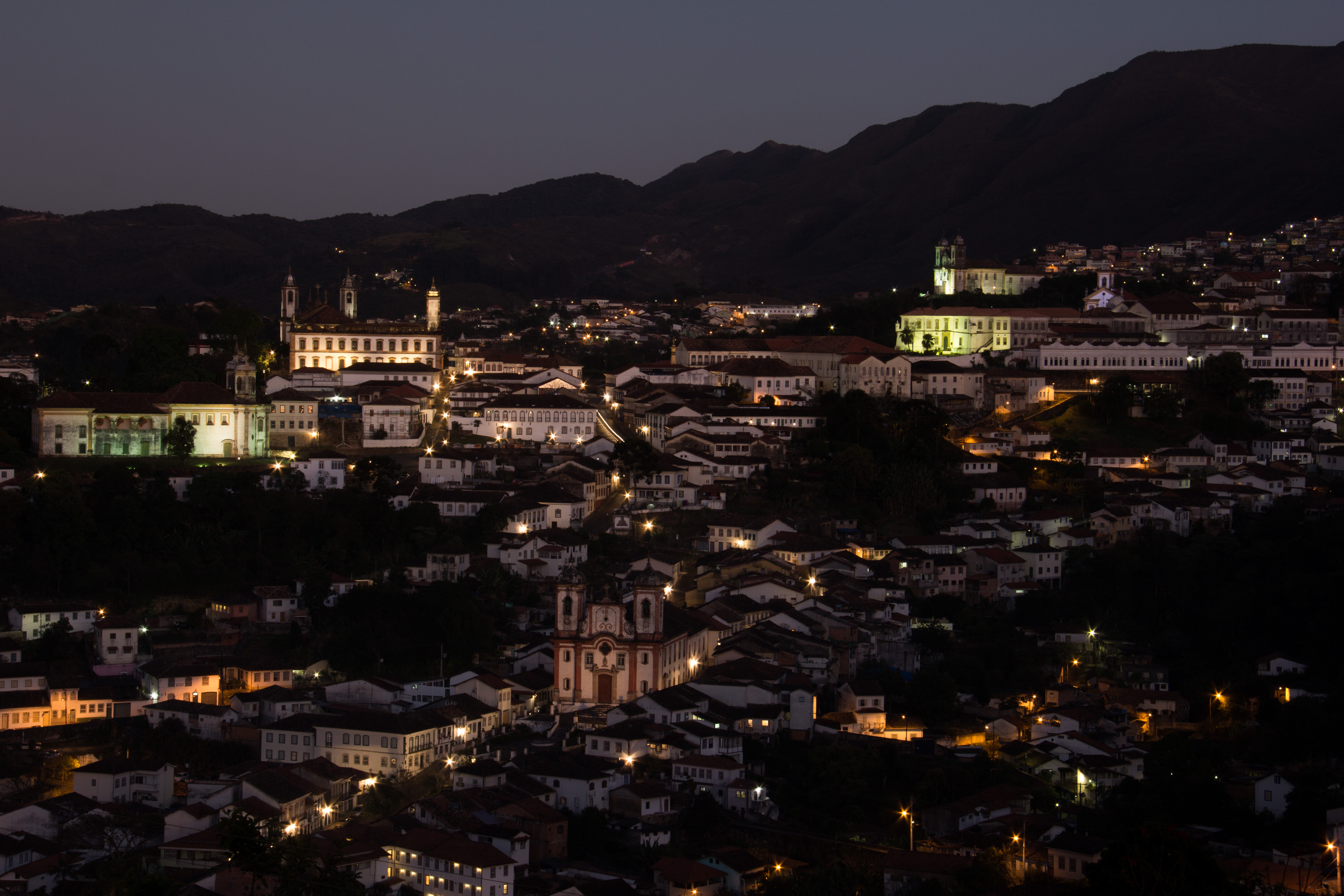
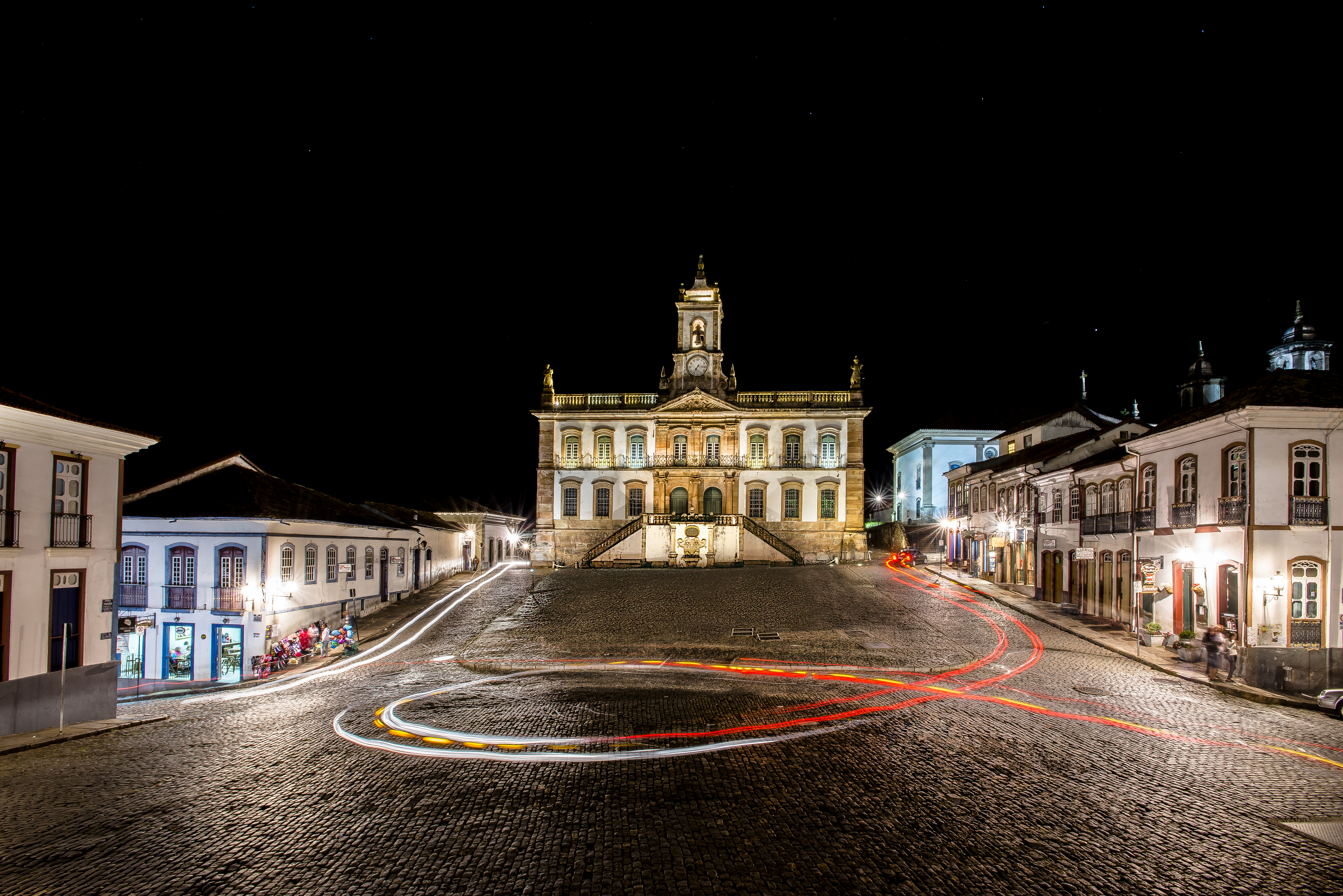
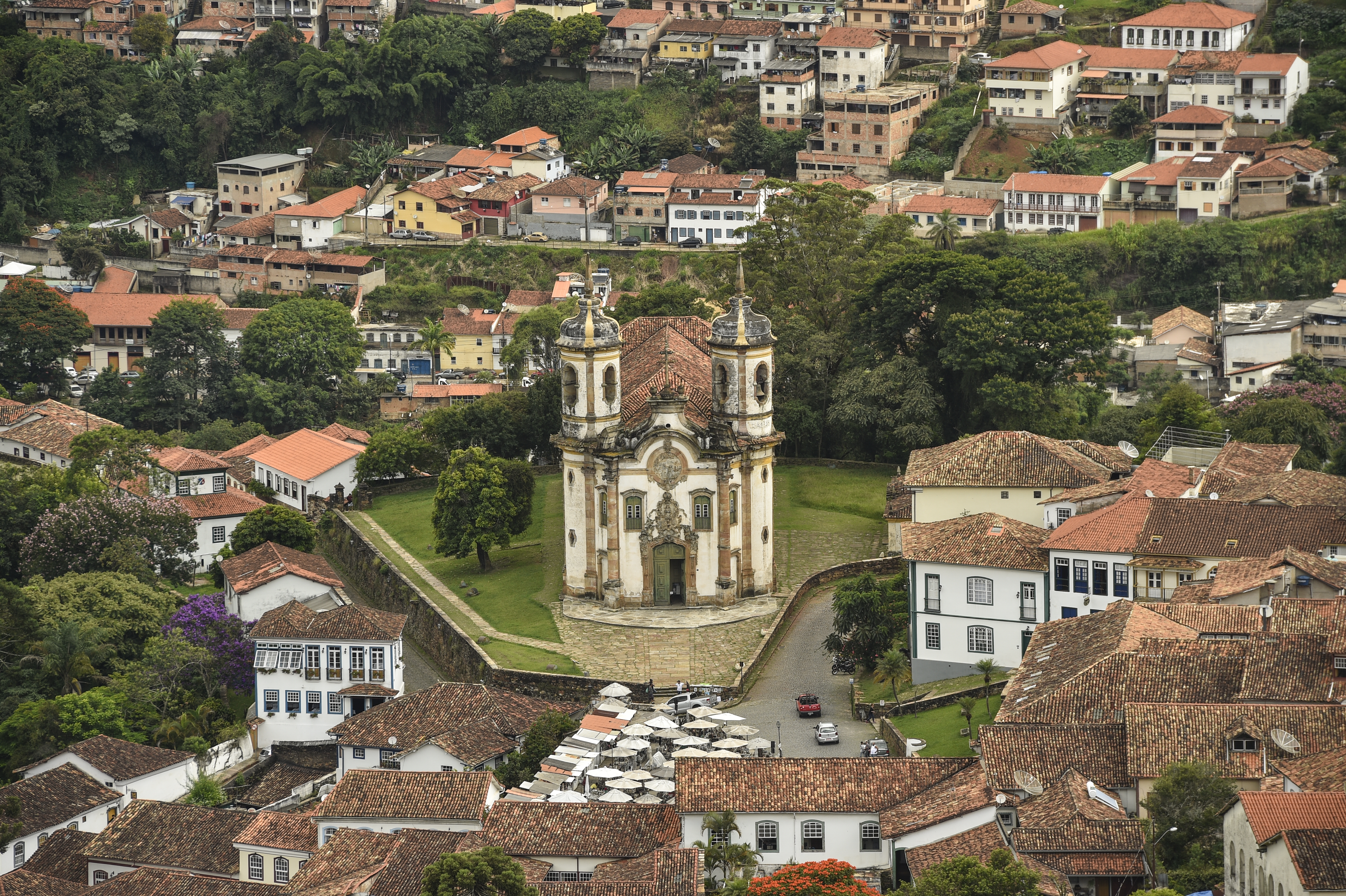
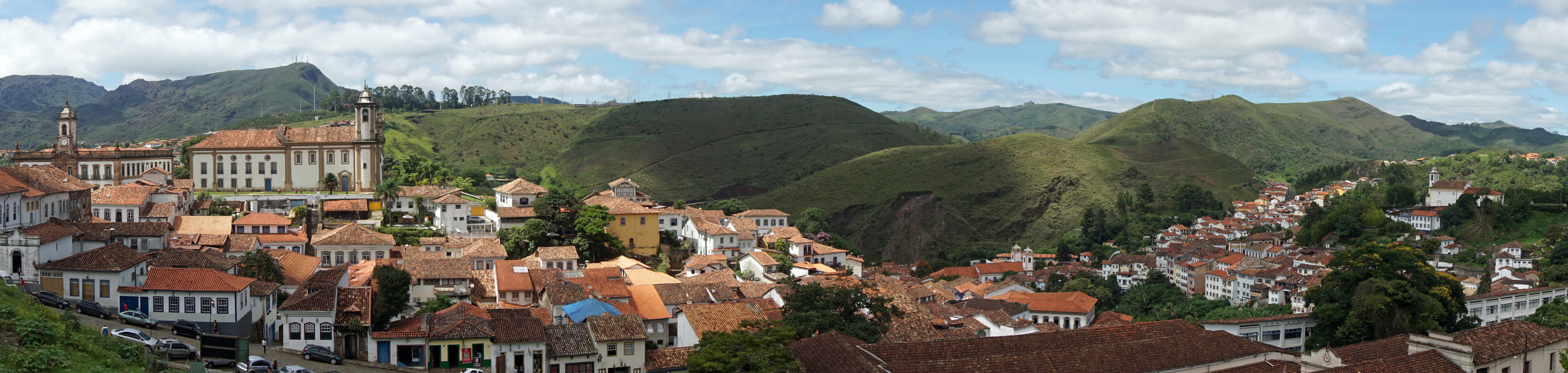

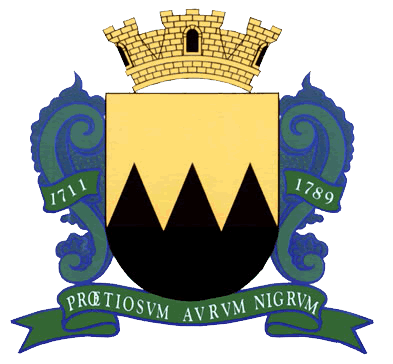
- Flag Coat of arms
- Motto: Proetiosum aurum nigrum (Precious black gold)
- Location in Minas Gerais
- Coordinates: 20°23′07″S 43°30′13″W
- Country: Brazil
- State: Minas Gerais
- Region: Southeast
- Intermediate Region: Belo Horizonte
- Immediate Region: Santa Bárbara-Ouro Preto
- Founded: 8 July 1711

Government
  - Mayor: Ângelo Oswaldo de Araújo Santos (PV)

Area
  - Total: 1,245.865 km^{2} (481.031 sq mi)
- Elevation: 1,150 m (3,770 ft)

Population (2022 Census)
  - Total: 74,821
  - Estimate (2025): 77,914
  - Density: 60.055/km^{2} (155.54/sq mi)
- Demonym: ouro-pretano
- Time zone: UTC−3 (BRT)
- HDI (2010): 0.741 – high
- Website: ouropreto.mg.gov.br

UNESCO World Heritage Site
- Official name: Historic Town of Ouro Preto
- Type: Cultural
- Criteria: i, iii
- Designated: 1980 (4th session)
- Reference no.: 124
- Region: South America

Ouro Preto (Portuguese pronunciation: [ˈo(w)ɾu ˈpɾetu], lit. 'Black Gold'), formerly Vila Rica (Portuguese pronunciation: [ˈvilɐ ˈʁikɐ], lit. 'Rich Town'), is a municipality in the state of Minas Gerais, Brazil. The city, a former colonial mining town located in the Serra do Espinhaço mountains, was designated a World Heritage Site by UNESCO due to its Baroque colonial architecture. Ouro Preto used to be the capital of Minas Gerais from 1720 until the foundation of Belo Horizonte in 1897.

The municipality became one of the most populous cities of Latin America, counting on about 40,000 people in 1730, and 80,000 in 1750. At that time, the population of New York was less than half of that number of inhabitants and the population of São Paulo did not surpass 8,000. Officially, 800 tons of gold were sent to Portugal in the eighteenth century, not to mention what was circulated in an illegal manner, nor what remained in the colony, such as gold used in the ornamentation of the churches.

Other historical cities in Minas Gerais are São João del-Rei, Diamantina, Mariana, Tiradentes, Congonhas and Sabará.

== History ==
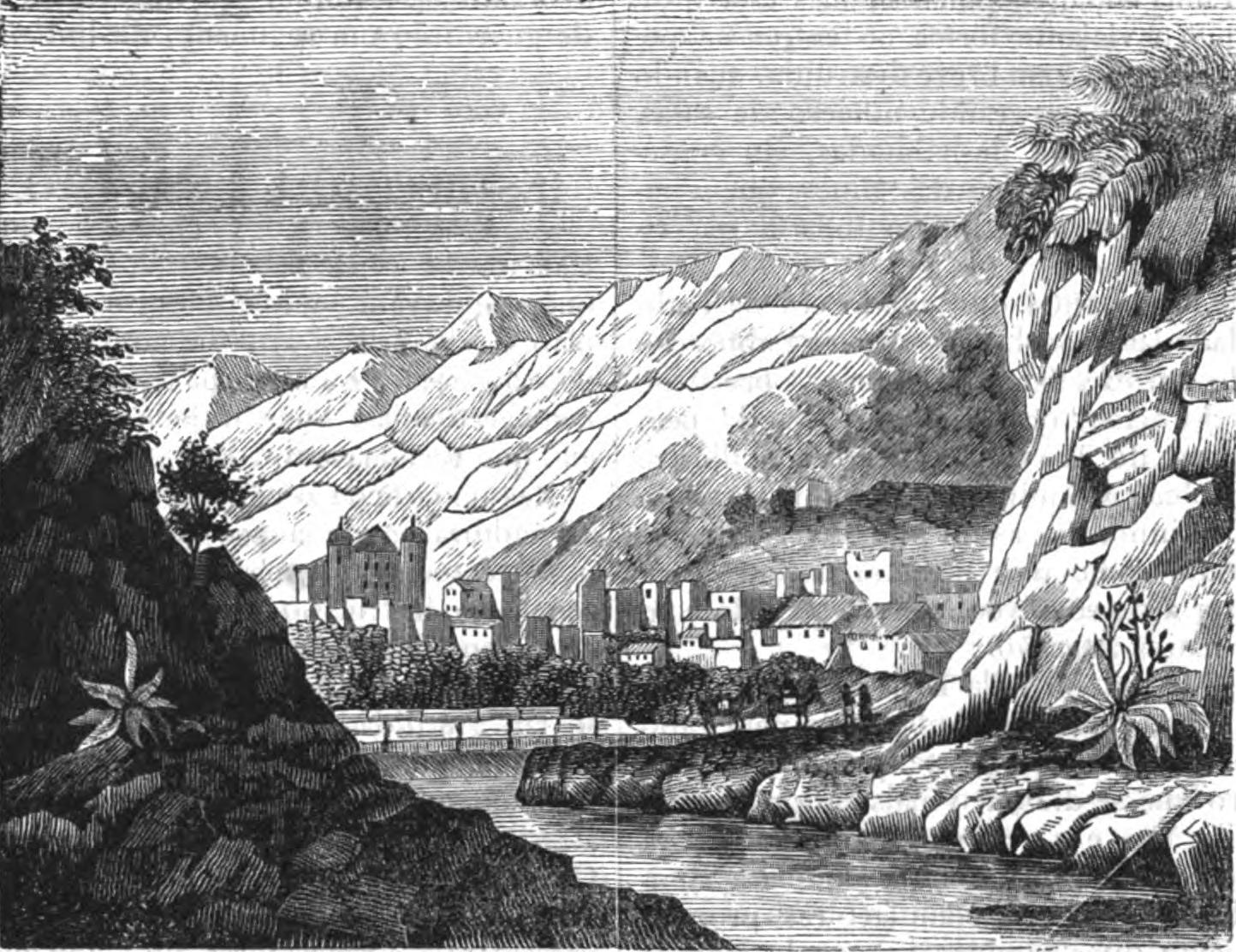
Villa Rica de Ouro Preto (19th century)

In 1695, at Rio das Velhas, Manuel Borba Gato discovered gold, the start of the Brazilian Gold Rush. In 1698, Vila Rica (later Ouro Preto) was established, becoming the capital of Minas Gerais from 1720 to 1897. In 1697, the Estrada Real was established by the crown to promote development of the interior, reaching from the coast through Ouro Preto onwards to Diamantina.

Founded at the end of the 17th century, Ouro Preto (meaning Black Gold) was originally called Vila Rica, or "Rich Village", the focal point of the gold rush and Brazil's golden age in the 18th century under Portuguese rule. Between 1695 and 1696, a gold-bearing stream was discovered in Itacolomi, which would be renamed Gualacho do Sul. In 1711, several small settlements were united as a municipality called Villa Rica, which later came to be called Ouro Preto. This name was adopted on 20 May 1823, when the former Vila Rica was elevated from village to city. The name "Black Gold" comes from the gold covered with a layer of iron oxide that is found in the city.

The city centre contains well-preserved Portuguese colonial architecture, with few signs of modern urban development. New construction must keep with the city's historical aesthetic. 18th- and 19th-century churches decorated with gold and the sculptured works of Aleijadinho make Ouro Preto a tourist destination.

The tremendous wealth from gold mining in the 18th century created a city which attracted the intelligentsia of Europe. Philosophy and art flourished, and evidence of a baroque revival called the "Barroco Mineiro" is illustrated in architecture as well as by sculptors such as Aleijadinho, painters such as Manoel da Costa Ataíde, composers such as Lobo de Mesquita, and poets such as Tomás António Gonzaga. At that time, Vila Rica was the largest city in Brazil, with 100,000 inhabitants.

In 1789, Ouro Preto became the birthplace of the Inconfidência Mineira, a failed attempt to gain independence from Portugal. The leading figure, Joaquim José da Silva Xavier, known as Tiradentes, was hanged as a threat to any future revolutionaries.

In 1876, the Escola de Minas (Mines School) was created. This school established the technological foundation for several of the mineral discoveries in Brazil.

Ouro Preto was the capital of Minas Gerais from 1720 until 1897, when the needs of government outgrew this town in the valley. The state government was moved to the new, planned city of Belo Horizonte.

== Geography ==
=== Important data ===
Population: Data from the 2010 Census (IBGE)

- Resident population: 70,227 (2010 Census)
- Urban area: 56,293
- Rural area: 9,985
- Area of the municipality: 1,245 km^{2}
- Temperature: between 6 and 28 degrees Celsius. In June and July the temperature can reach -2 degrees Celsius.
- Average elevation: 1,116 m. The highest point is Pico de Itacolomi with 1,722 meters.
- The city has twelve districts: Amarantina, Antônio Pereira, Cachoeira do Campo, Engenheiro Correia, Glaura, Lavras Novas, Miguel Burnier, Santa Rita, Santo Antônio do Leite, Santo Antônio do Salto, São Bartolomeu and Rodrigo Silva.
- Rivers: sources for the Velhas, Piracicaba, Gualaxo do Norte, Gualaxo do Sul, Mainart e Ribeirão Funil.
- Per Capita Income: R$23,622 (US$6,270.16)
- HDI: 0.741 (High)

=== Location ===
The city is linked by unlit winding roads to highways for:

- Belo Horizonte 100 km
- Rio de Janeiro 475 km
- São Paulo 675 km
- Brasília 840 km

Bordering municipalities are:

- North: Itabirito and Santa Bárbara
- South: Ouro Branco, Catas Altas da Noruega, Piranga and Itaverava
- East: Mariana
- West: Belo Vale and Congonhas

=== Climate ===
Located at 1,179 m (3,868 ft) above sea level, Ouro Preto has a tropical highland climate (Cwb, according to the Köppen climate classification), with humid summers, dry winters and mild temperatures throughout the year. Frost is occasional and occur in June and July. There is a report of snow in the city in the year of 1843.

Climate data for Ouro Preto, Brazil
Month	Jan	Feb	Mar	Apr	May	Jun	Jul	Aug	Sep	Oct	Nov	Dec	Year
Mean daily maximum °C (°F)	26.0 (78.8)	26.1 (79.0)	25.3 (77.5)	24.0 (75.2)	22.5 (72.5)	21.6 (70.9)	21.3 (70.3)	23.0 (73.4)	24.0 (75.2)	24.2 (75.6)	24.5 (76.1)	24.6 (76.3)	23.9 (75.1)
Mean daily minimum °C (°F)	15.6 (60.1)	15.5 (59.9)	14.0 (57.2)	13.4 (56.1)	10.9 (51.6)	9.1 (48.4)	8.3 (46.9)	9.5 (49.1)	12.0 (53.6)	13.7 (56.7)	14.7 (58.5)	15.2 (59.4)	12.7 (54.8)
Average precipitation mm (inches)	283 (11.1)	208 (8.2)	175 (6.9)	82 (3.2)	29 (1.1)	17 (0.7)	15 (0.6)	24 (0.9)	57 (2.2)	115 (4.5)	223 (8.8)	324 (12.8)	1,552 (61)
Source: Climatedata.org.

== Economy ==
Although Ouro Preto now relies heavily on the tourism industry for part of its economy, there are important metallurgic and mining industries located in town, such as Novelis, formerly Alcan, the most important aluminum factory in the country, Vale S.A., and others. Main economic activities are tourism, transformation industries, and mineral riches such as deposits of iron, bauxite, manganese, talc and marble.

Minerals of note in the city are: gold, hematite, dolomite, tourmaline, pyrite, muscovite, topaz and imperial topaz, which is a stone only found in Ouro Preto.

Soapstone handicraft items are a common souvenir among tourists, and can be found in many shops in the city's town centre and street fairs. Jewelry made of local precious and semi-precious gemstones (such as hematite) can also be found for sale.

== The University and the fraternities ==
Ouro Preto is also a university town with an intense student life. The Universidade Federal de Ouro Preto (Federal University of Ouro Preto or UFOP) has approximately 10,000 students in the city. Many of them live in communal houses that are somewhat similar to fraternity houses as found in North American colleges. These communal or shared houses are called repúblicas, 66 of which are owned by the university, called repúblicas federais, and 250 are privately owned (repúblicas particulares).

The repúblicas system of Ouro Preto is unique in Brazil. No other university city in the country has exactly the same characteristics of the student lodgings found there. It shares traits with the repúblicas of the Portuguese University of Coimbra, where the tradition originated. Before universities were founded in Brazil, Coimbra was where most of the rich students who could afford an overseas education went to. Each república has its own different history. There are repúblicas in which the freshmen, also known as "bixos" (misspelling of "bichos", Portuguese for "animals"), have to undergo a hazing period, called batalha (battle), before being accepted permanently as residents of the houses. The final choice of the freshmen, called escolha, has to be unanimous among the senior students of the house.

The Museu Mineralógico da Escola de Minas (Mineralogy Museum) can be of special interest to visitors. It belongs to the UFOP's School of Mining, which opened its doors on 12 October 1876. The museum is located at the Tiradentes Square No. 20, in the town's historical center, and contains a rich assortment of minerals on display, including precious and semi-precious gemstones and large crystals. Security is tight, however (for example, no cameras are allowed), due to the incalculable value of the gemstones and ores on display.

== Tourist attractions ==
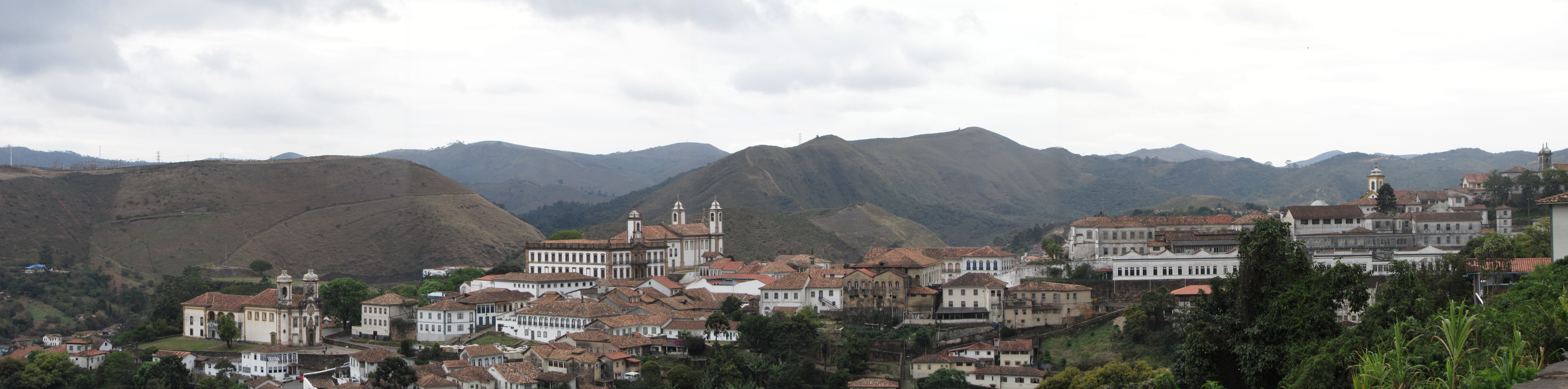
Panoramic view

Ouro Preto is a major tourist destination, for its well-preserved colonial appearance with baroque architecture and cobblestone streets.

=== Churches ===
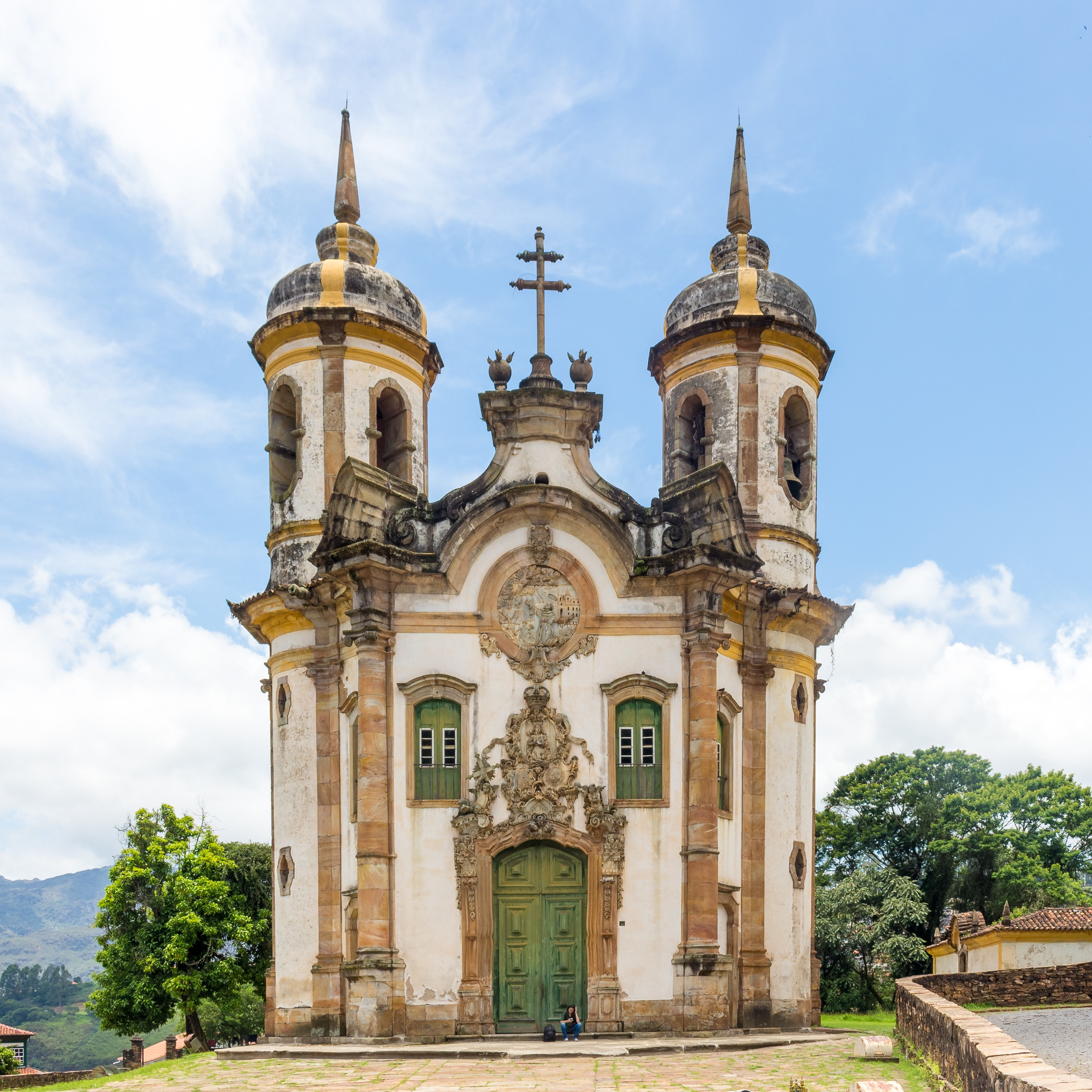
Church of Saint Francis of Assisi

The city contains numerous churches, many known for their religious art and baroque architecture. Some of the best known are:

- Nossa Senhora do Carmo (Our Lady of Mount Carmel) - just off Tiradentes Square, next to the Inconfidência Museum.
- São Francisco de Assis (St. Francis of Assisi)
- Nossa Senhora da Conceiçao (Immaculate Conception)
- Capela do Padre Faria (Father Faria's Chapel)
- Nossa Senhora das Mercês (Our Lady of Mercy)
- Nossa Senhora do Pilar (Our Lady of the Pillar)
- Nossa Senhora do Rosário (Our Lady of the Rosary)

=== Museums ===
- Museu da Inconfidência - In the former municipal palace on Tiradentes Plaza, traces the Inconfidencia independence movement.
- Museu do Oratório (Oratory Museum) - next to the church of Nossa Senhora do Carmo, displays religious art.
- Museu de Ciência e Técnica (Museum of Science and Technology) - in the Ouro Preto School of Mines building on Tiradentes Plaza. The museum is noted for its collection of mineral specimens.
- Casa Dos Contos - Historical museum.
- Capela Padre Fabio de Mello
- Museu do Aleijadinho - In the Antônio Dias plaza, historical museum known for the collection of pieces of Aleijadinho.

=== Mines ===
A number of former gold mines in the city offer tours to tourists. One of the most well known is the Mina do Chico Rei, near the sanctuary of Nossa Senhora da Conceição. Another infamous mine is the Mina da passagem. In the early 19th century, Portugal gave the United Kingdom exclusive use of this mine for 100 years to pay Portugal's sovereign debts. This is the world's largest mine open to the public. The municipality contains about 10% of the 31,270 hectares (77,300 acres) Serra do Gandarela National Park, created in 2014.

=== Carnival ===
The street carnival in Ouro Preto attracts thousands of people every year. Carnival blocks are the most traditional type of parade, where bands play across the town, followed by herds of paraders dressed up in costumes. The block Zé Pereira dos Lacaios, founded in 1867, is the oldest block that is still active in Brazil. Parades with samba schools also happen.

The street party is also celebrated in neighbouring towns such as Mariana.

== Miscellaneous ==
Ouro Preto was a setting in the comedy movie Moon over Parador (1988), with actors Richard Dreyfuss and Sonia Braga.

Mining is Brazil's sixth largest industry.

== Gallery ==
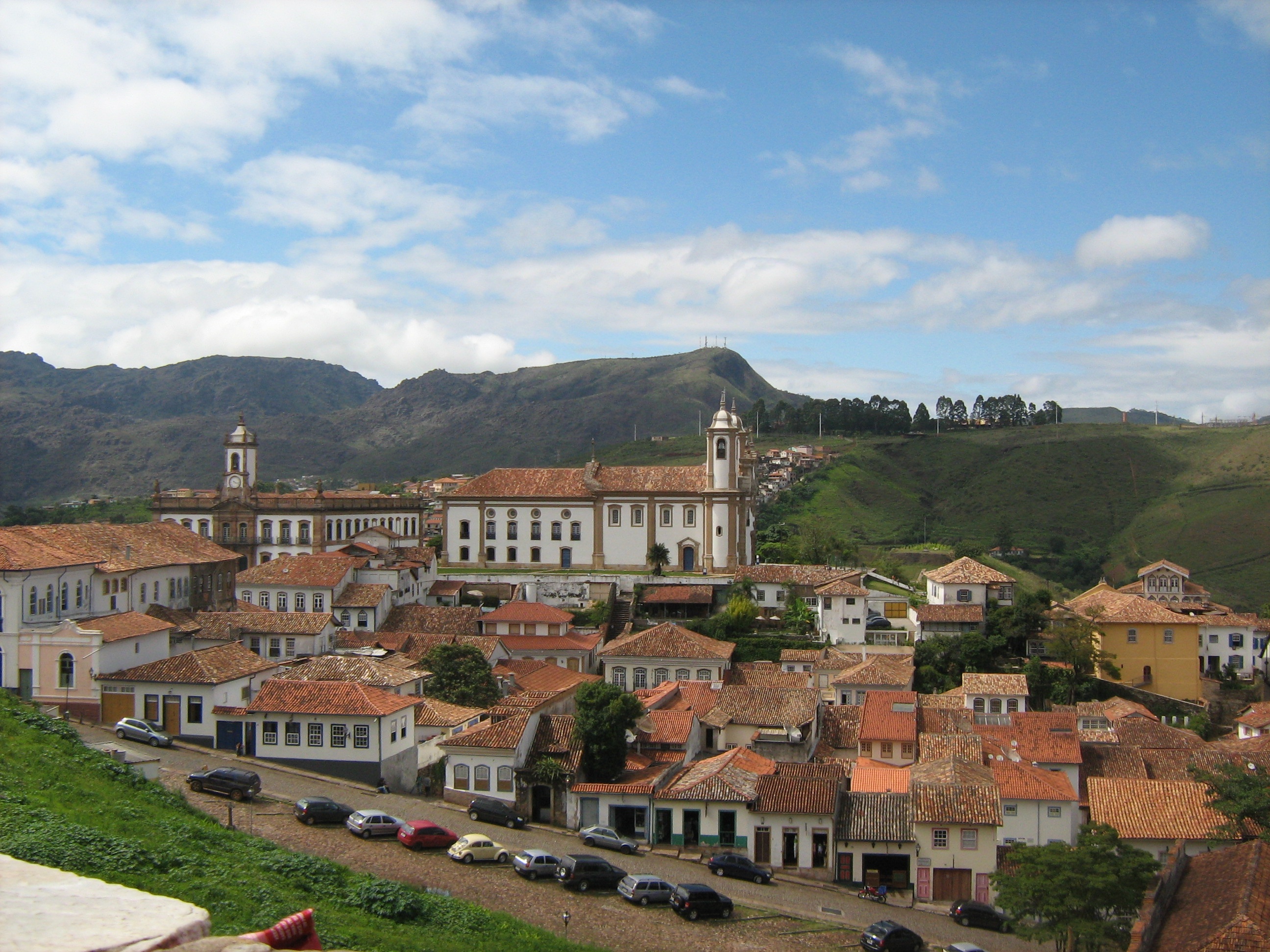

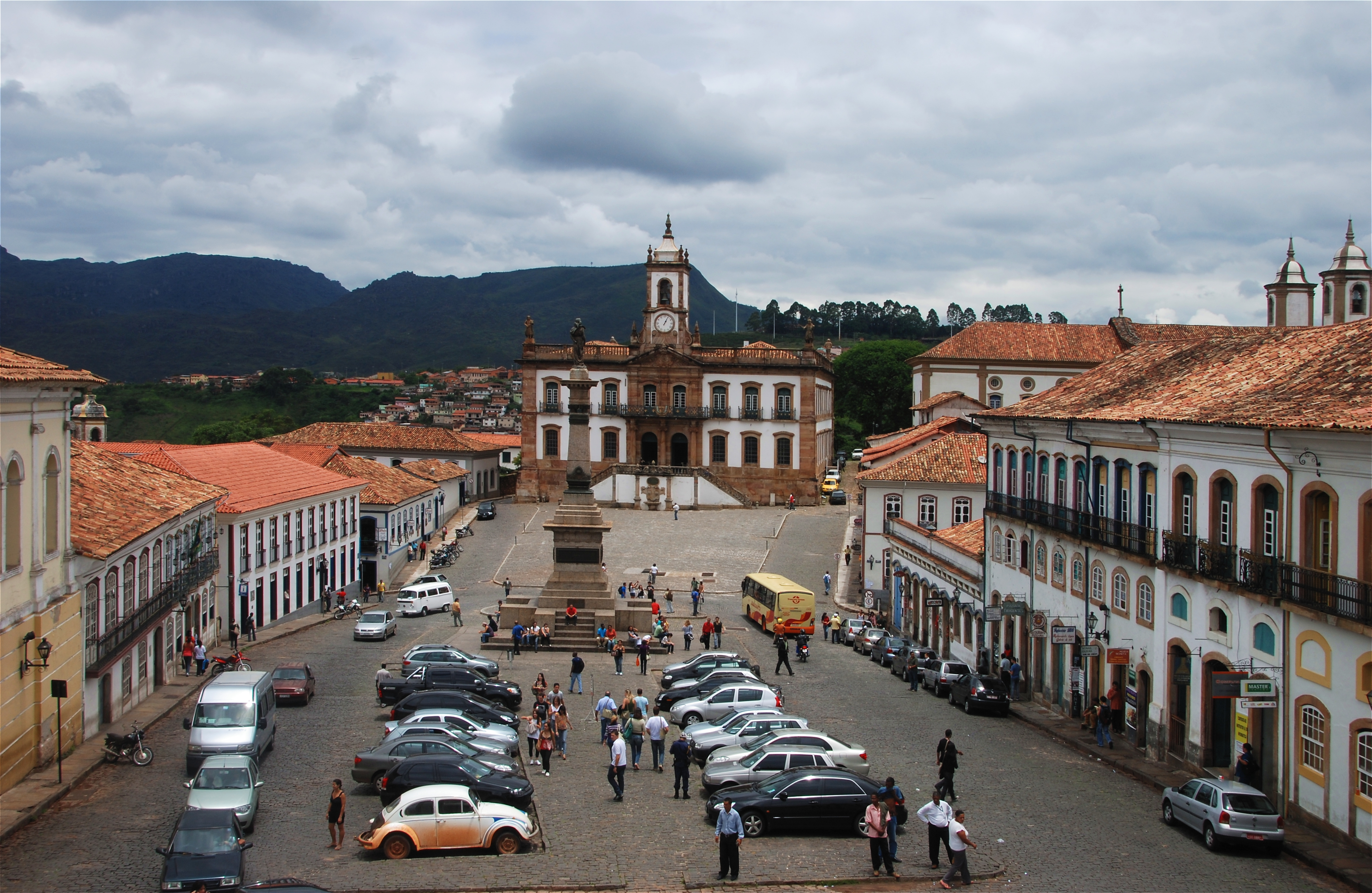

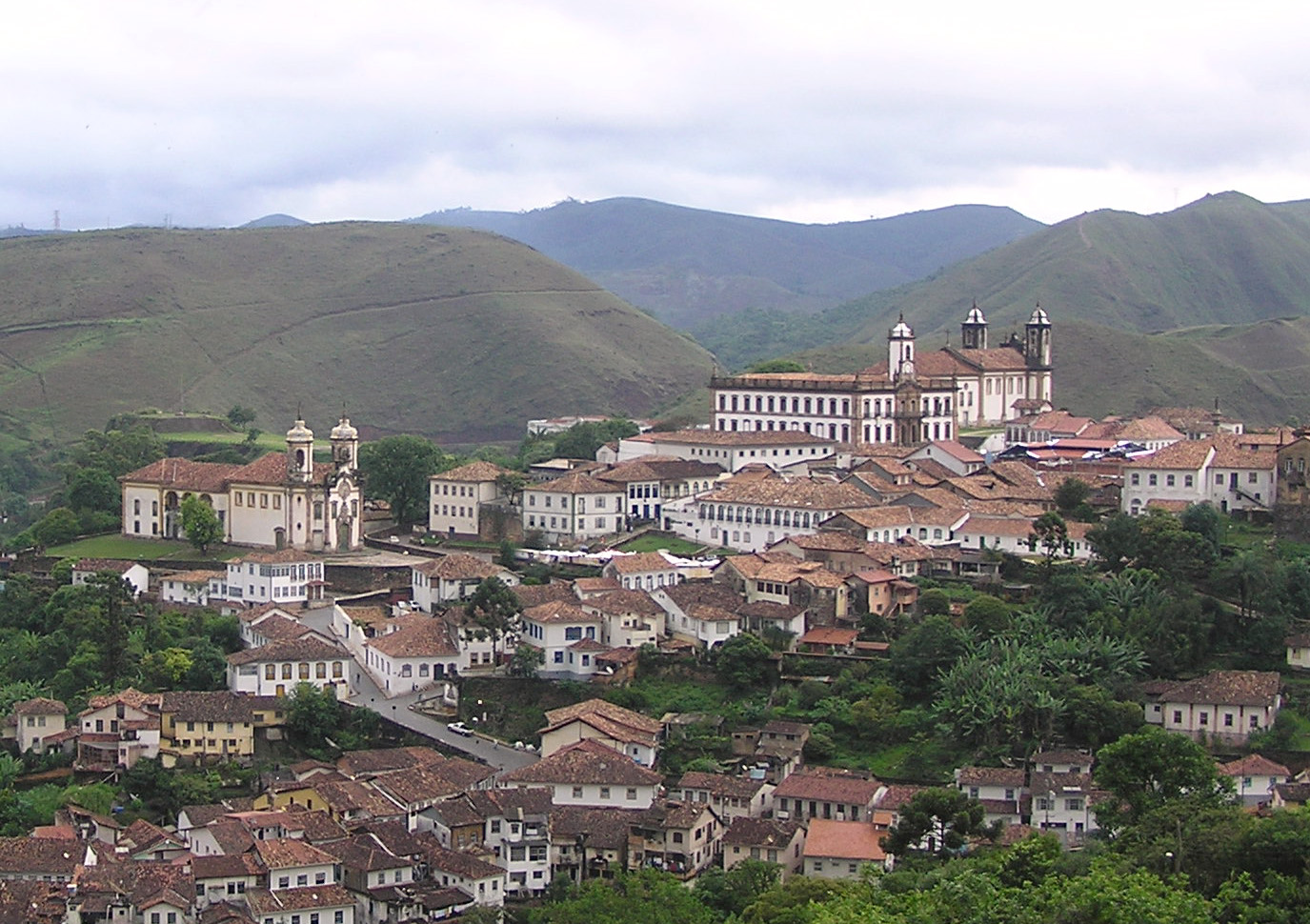

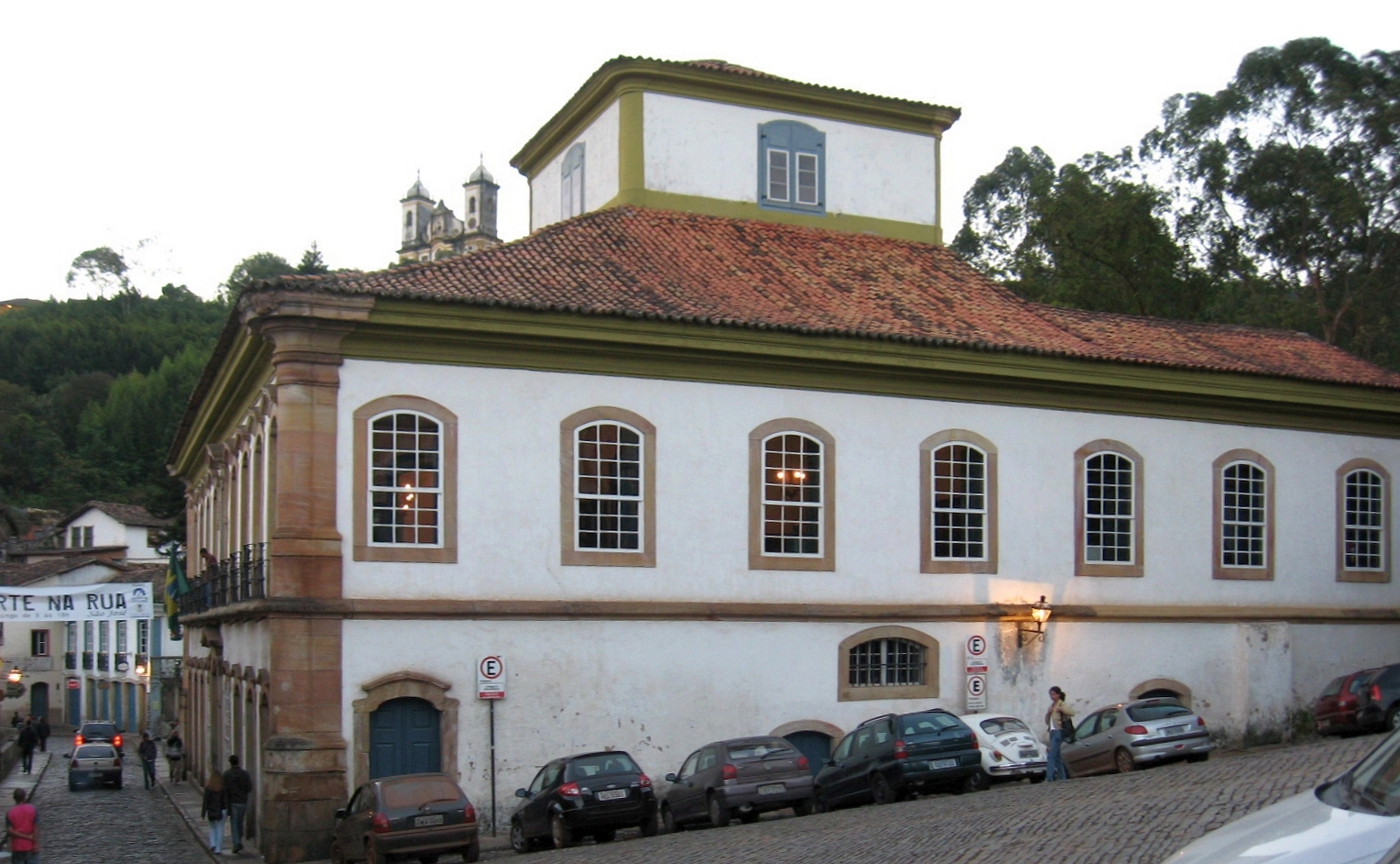

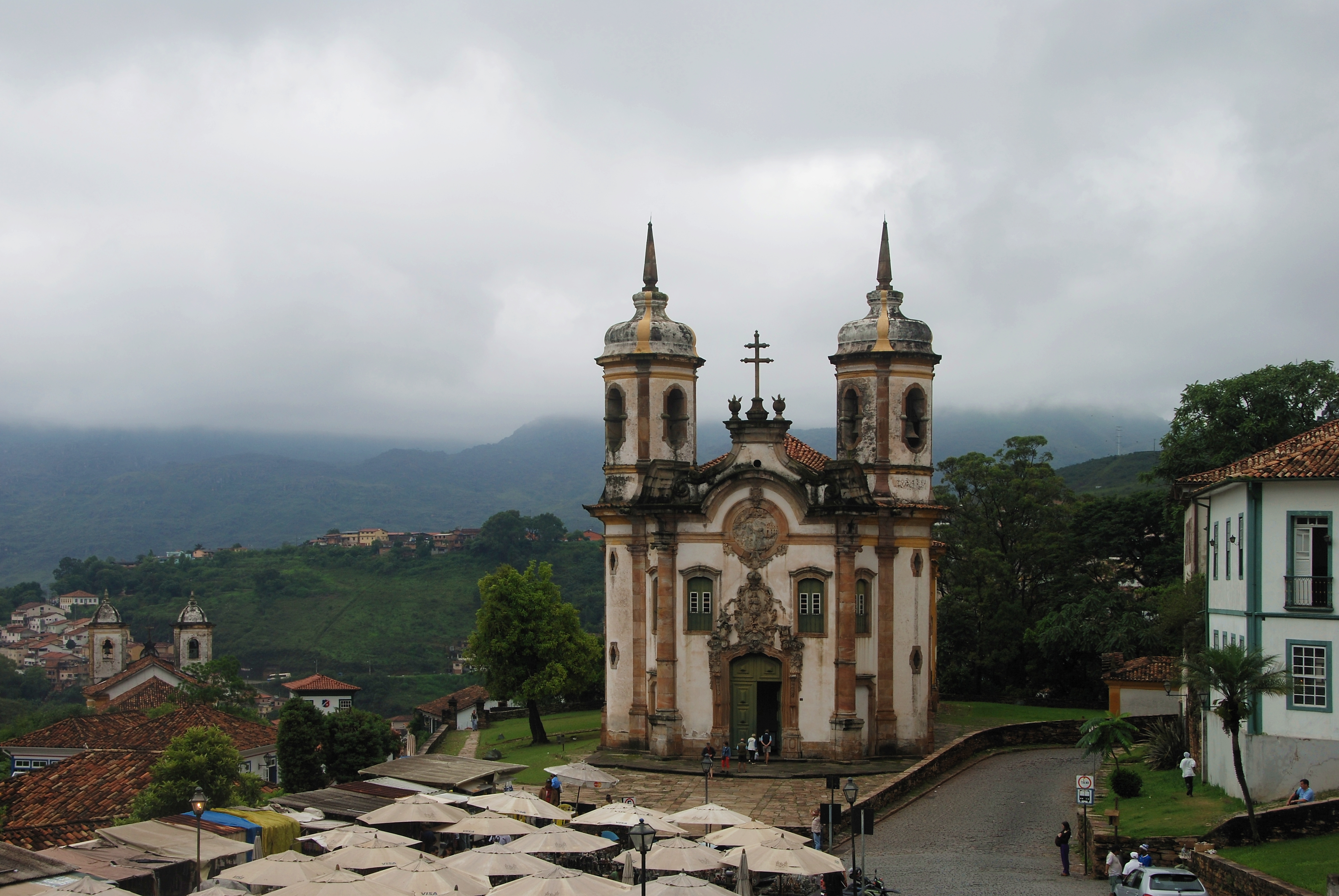

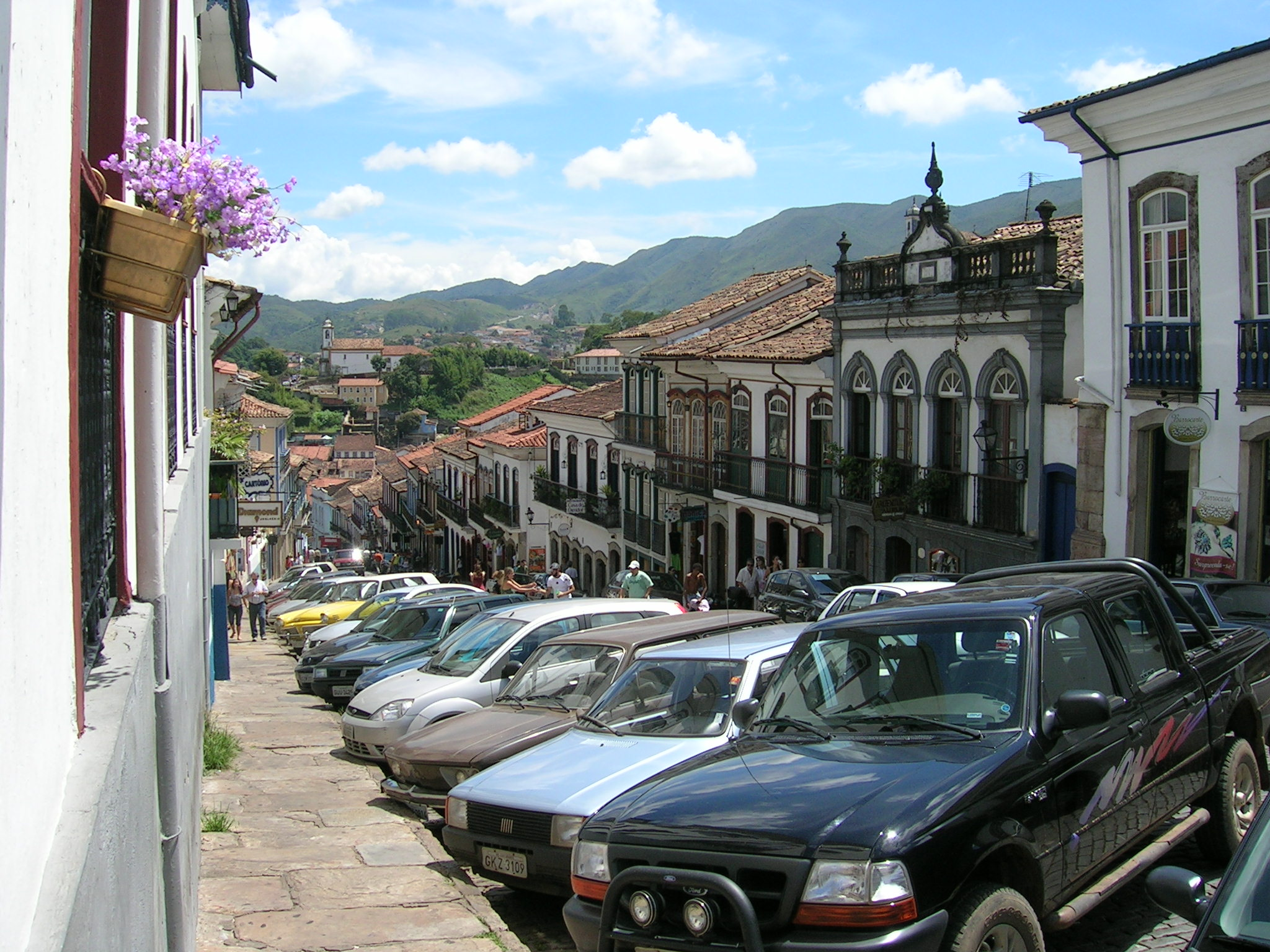

== See also ==
- List of municipalities in Minas Gerais
