= Our Lady of the Pillar Mother Church (Ouro Preto) =

Catholic church in Ouro Preto (Minas Gerais, Brazil)

- Igreja Matriz Nossa Senhora do Pilar
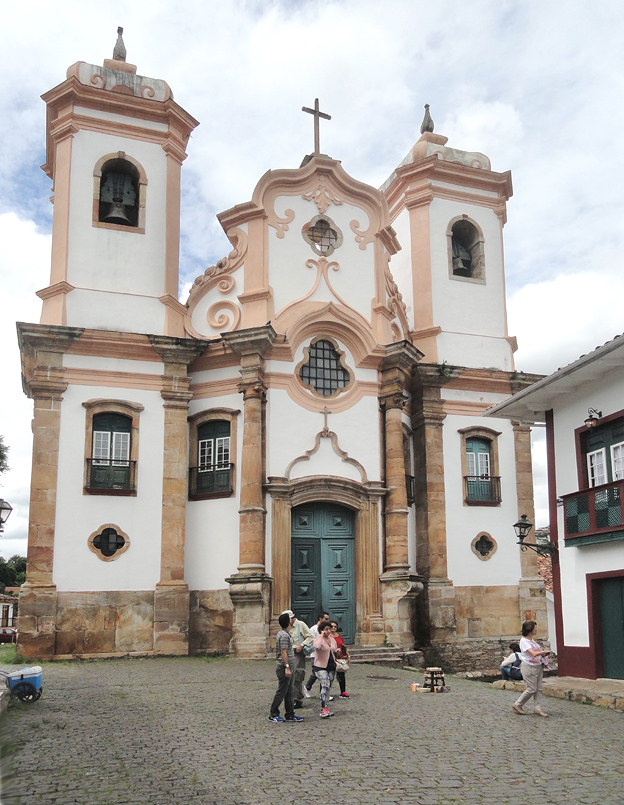
- Our Lady of the Pillar Mother Church
- 20.386823°S 43.507423°W
- Location: Ouro Preto, Minas Gerais
- Country: Brazil
- Denomination: Roman Catholic Church

Architecture
- Architectural type: Basilica
- Style: Baroque, rococo
- Years built: 1696–1712

National Historic Heritage of Brazil
- Designated: 1939
- Process number: 75-T-1938
- IPHAN: Entry No. 246

The Minor Basilica of Our Lady of the Pillar (Brazilian Portuguese: Basílica Menor Nossa Senhora do Pilar) in Ouro Preto, Minas Gerais, popularly called the Our Lady of the Pillar Mother Church (Brazilian Portuguese: Igreja Matriz Nossa Senhora do Pilar), is one of the best known Catholic buildings among those erected during the Brazilian Gold Rush. It is a listed monument by the National Historic and Artistic Heritage Institute (IPHAN). It is located at the Monsenhor Castilho Barbosa Square.

== History ==
The devotion to Our Lady of the Pillar was probably brought from São Paulo, in the flag of Bartolomeu Bueno, and the image was enthroned in the primitive little chapel that preceded the temple.

The present church was built around a chapel erected in 1696 (or the early years of the 18th century), and enlarged in 1712 with resources from the devotees, although the main interventions followed until the end of the century. According to records, the construction was encouraged by the governor himself.

The Parish of the Pillar was the richest and most populous in Vila Rica, since it gathered the largest number of brotherhoods and, therefore, the Mother Church received more ornaments in preparation for a "good death." The brotherhoods had specific places within the temple, a way to represent and express the social hierarchy of the faithful. The Livro de Compromissos (Book of Commitments) listed the participation of the Brotherhood of the Eucharist (1712), in addition to the ones of Our Lady of the Pillar (1712), Saint Michael and Souls (1712), Rosary of the Blacks (1715), Lord of the Steps (1715), Saint Anne (first quarter) and Our Lady of the Conception (until the first third of the 18th century).

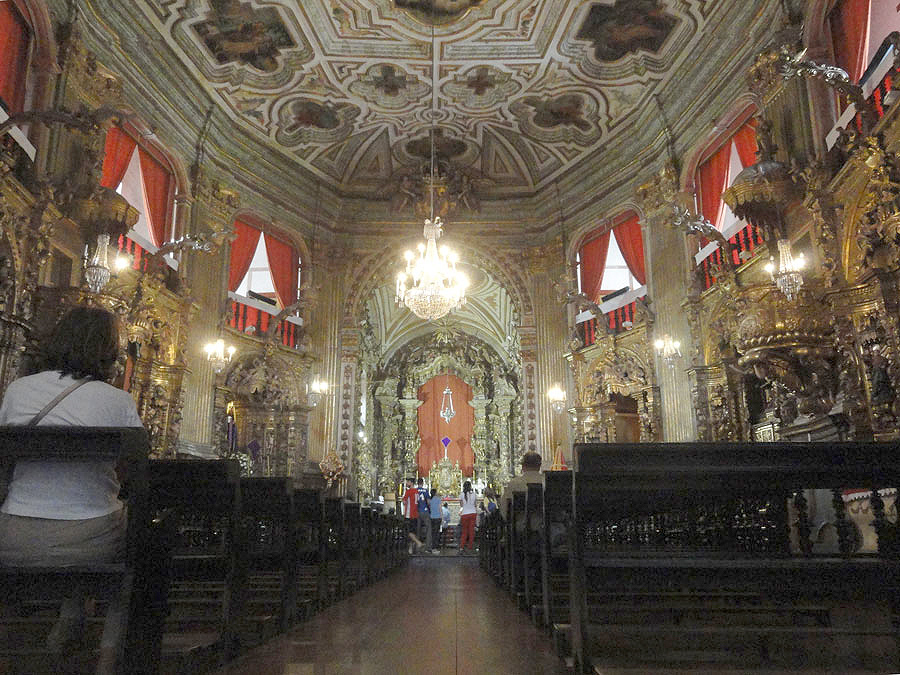
View of the nave.

The construction began with the nave, contrary to the custom of the time, when it was usuallystarted with the chancel. This was due to the need to preserve the primitive chapel so the masses would not be interrupted. However, this occurred between 1731 and 1733, when the chapel was finally demolished. In this period, the Eucharist was transferred to the Rosário Church. Its return to Pillar took place in a great festivity, the procession of the Eucharistic Triumph, which became famous in the history of Ouro Preto.

The decoration took another 20 years to be completed, occurring amid structural problems in the vault, which suffered from rain infiltration. Further difficulties came from the instability of one of the towers, which threatened to collapse, and in 1781 its rammed earth structure was replaced by a stonemasonry one. The same problem later afflicted one of the side walls, replaced in 1825 also by masonry. In 1848 the stone frontispiece and the other tower were completed. The current facade, built in the mid-nineteenth century, replaces the eighteenth-century one, constituting, "a kind of synthesis of the Rosário and São Francisco frontispieces, having also suffered influence from Carmo in the pediment", as pointed out by Germain Bazin.

== Architectural and artistic aspects ==
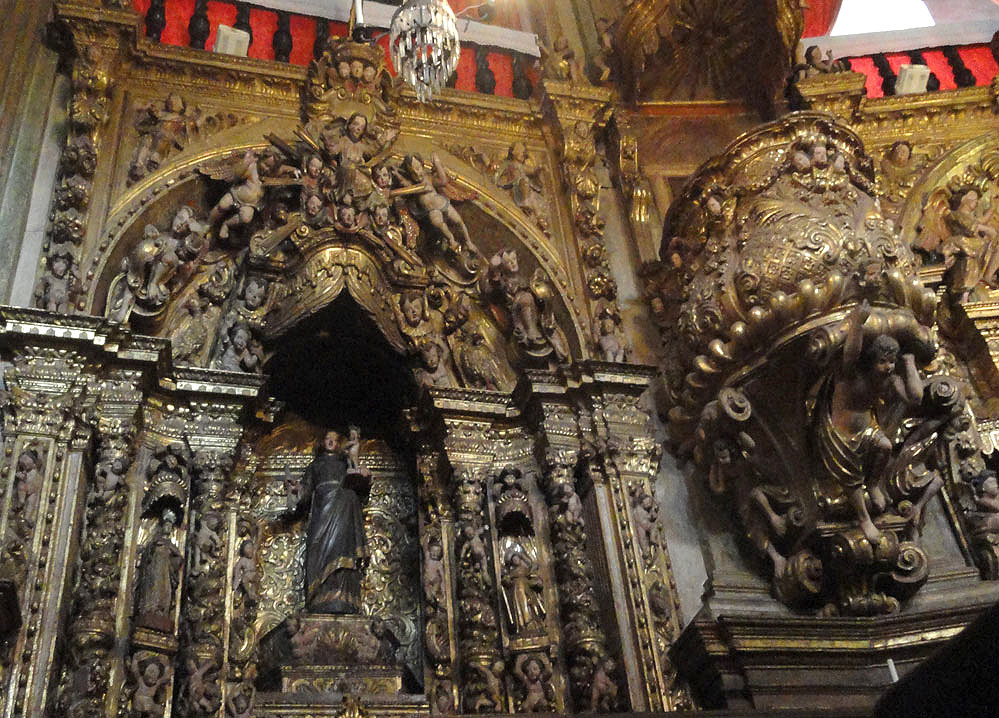
Detail of the Saint Anthony altar and pulpit.

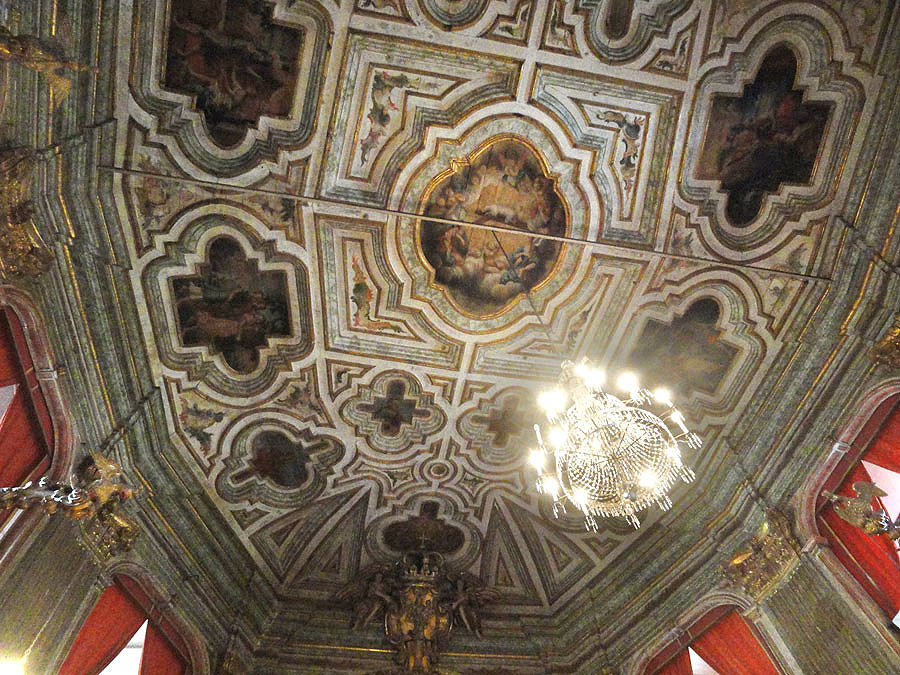
Detail of the nave's ceiling.

Its design is attributed to military engineer Pedro Gomes Chaves Xavier from a 1736 polygonal layout attributed to Antônio Francisco Pombal. In IPHAN's appreciation, the layout follows the traditional Baroque model in Minas Gerais, "[...] characterized by the juxtaposition of two quadrangular forms, the first corresponding to the nave or body of the church, and the second, more elongated, to the chancel and sacristy, with the traditional consistory on the second floor. The access to the sacristy is made by side aisles topped by tribunes. The polygonal shape of the nave comes from a posthung wooden structure, with heavy struts that support the frame of the altarpieces and the tribunes, extending to the roof."

One of the peculiarities of this temple is the transposition of the entrance door, a feature used to cause "a sense of surprise and delight."

Its interior is decorated with carpentry work, done by Antônio da Silva and Antonio Francisco Pombal, brother of Aleijadinho's father. She also mentions that the altars of Saint Michael, Steps, Rosary of the Blacks and Lord of the Steps, Saint Anne (were done between 1733 and 1735 by Manoel de Brito. The only altar that did not have his work was that of Saint Anthony. The IPHAN, on the other hand, states that "[...] nothing is known about the side altars and pulpits built by private brotherhoods. Six in number, it is known that the altars dedicated to Saint Anthony and Our Lady of Pains (the first and third on the Gospel side) are prior to the others and may have belonged to the primitive church. The crowns were probably remade by Antonio Francisco Pombal. The four remaining altars and the two pulpits are entirely gilded and are characterized by refined Baroque, with profuse ornamentation. The entire ensemble is probably situated in the period between 1730 and 1740."

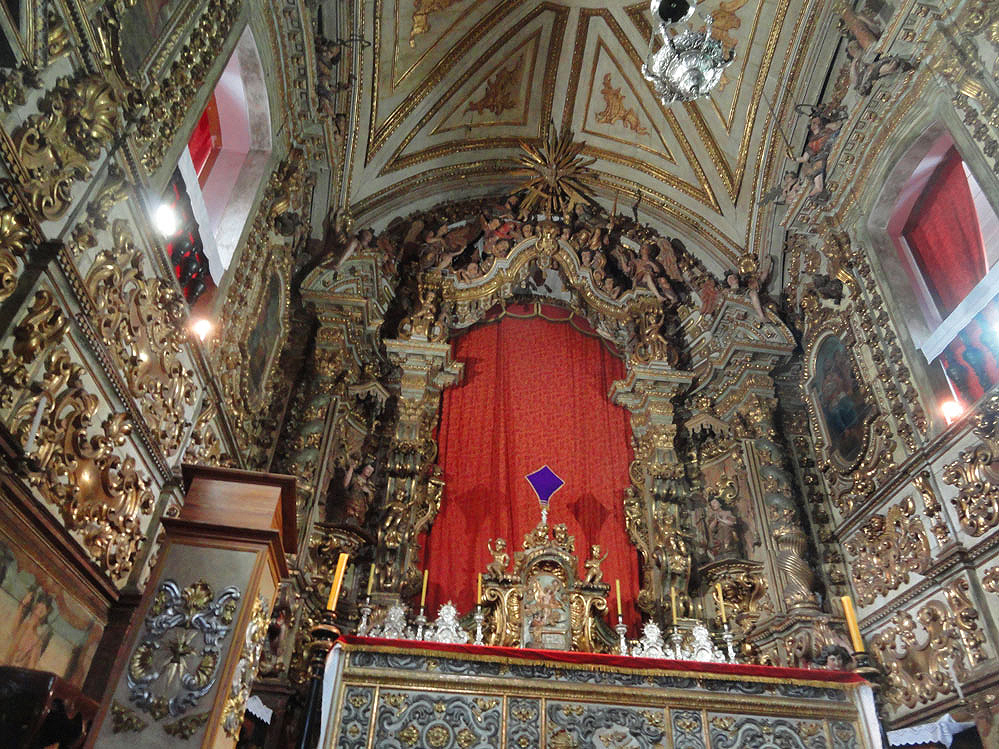
Detail of the chancel.

The carving ranged from the Portuguese National Style to the Joanine Style, which comprise two phases of the Baroque. The painting work and the marbling "scenic" artifice were done by João de Carvalhais and Bernardo Pires.

The carving of the chancel, considered the masterpiece of the genre in the period, was made by Francisco Xavier de Brito and executed from 1746 to 1751, that is, until his death. The work includes the Virgin of the Pillar enthroned in a place traditionally reserved for the Eucharist and the coronation is surrounded by several angels and cherubs of different sizes. Solomonic columns and corbelled pilasters called quartelões were adopted as supporting elements, but they also exalt strength and manliness.

The cross arch was carved by Ventura Alves Carneiro in 1751. The throne resplendor of the chancel received a carving by José Coelho de Noronha in 1754.

The nave lining has a rococo pictorial set from 1768 also attributed to João de Carvalhais. There are fifteen panels with marbled and sparkled frames depicting passages from the Old Testament.

== Museum of Sacred Art of Pillar ==
In the sacristy is the Museum of Sacred Art of the Pillar, which brings together about 8,000 pieces from the 17th to 19th centuries, as well as documents and some of the vestments used in the celebration of the Eucharist and Holy Week.

== Heritage interventions ==
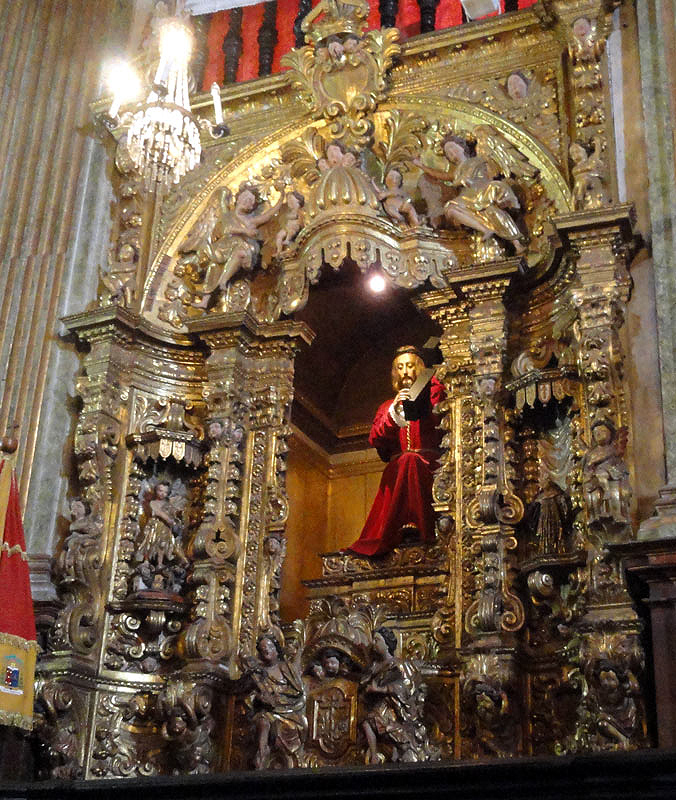
Detail of the Lord of the Steps altar.

Periodically, extensions of ornaments occurred, but among the works necessary to maintain the physical structure of the temple, it must be highlighted: the urgent repair of a tower in 1781; the replacement of a rammed earth wall in 1825, since it had been threatening to collapse since 1818; and the completion of the frontispiece and gospel tower in 1848.

IPHAN declared it a national heritage site in 1939. The institute carried out gilding and painting works between 1952 and 1965.

In March 2010, IPHAN began to perform the external painting and cleaning of the stonework and facades of the temple. The church is also declared heritage by the State Institute of Historical and Artistic Heritage of Minas Gerais (IEPHA).

The temple also had work done on the roof and installation of lightning rods.

The colors follow the current chromatic pattern and the characteristics of a photograph dated 1988, the last time the temple was painted. The colors are oxide red, fir green, and ochre yellow on the windows, doors, and frames; pure white masonry; and black railings. The mass frames, in light yellow, are on the corners, architraves, and volutes of the pediment of the main facade.

The paint used, in the current interventions, is more natural, silicate-based and with lime, aspects that confer more durability, resistance, impermeability and technical performance.

== Elevation to Basilica ==
On December 1, 2012, in a solemn ceremony, the Our Lady of the Pillar Mother Church was elevated to the status of Minor Basilica.

== See also ==
- Aleijadinho
- Baroque in Brazil
- Colonial architecture of Brazil
- Church of Saint Francis of Assisi (Ouro Preto)
