= Church of Our Lady of Mount Carmel (Ouro Preto) =

Church in Ouro Preto, Minas Gerais, Brazil

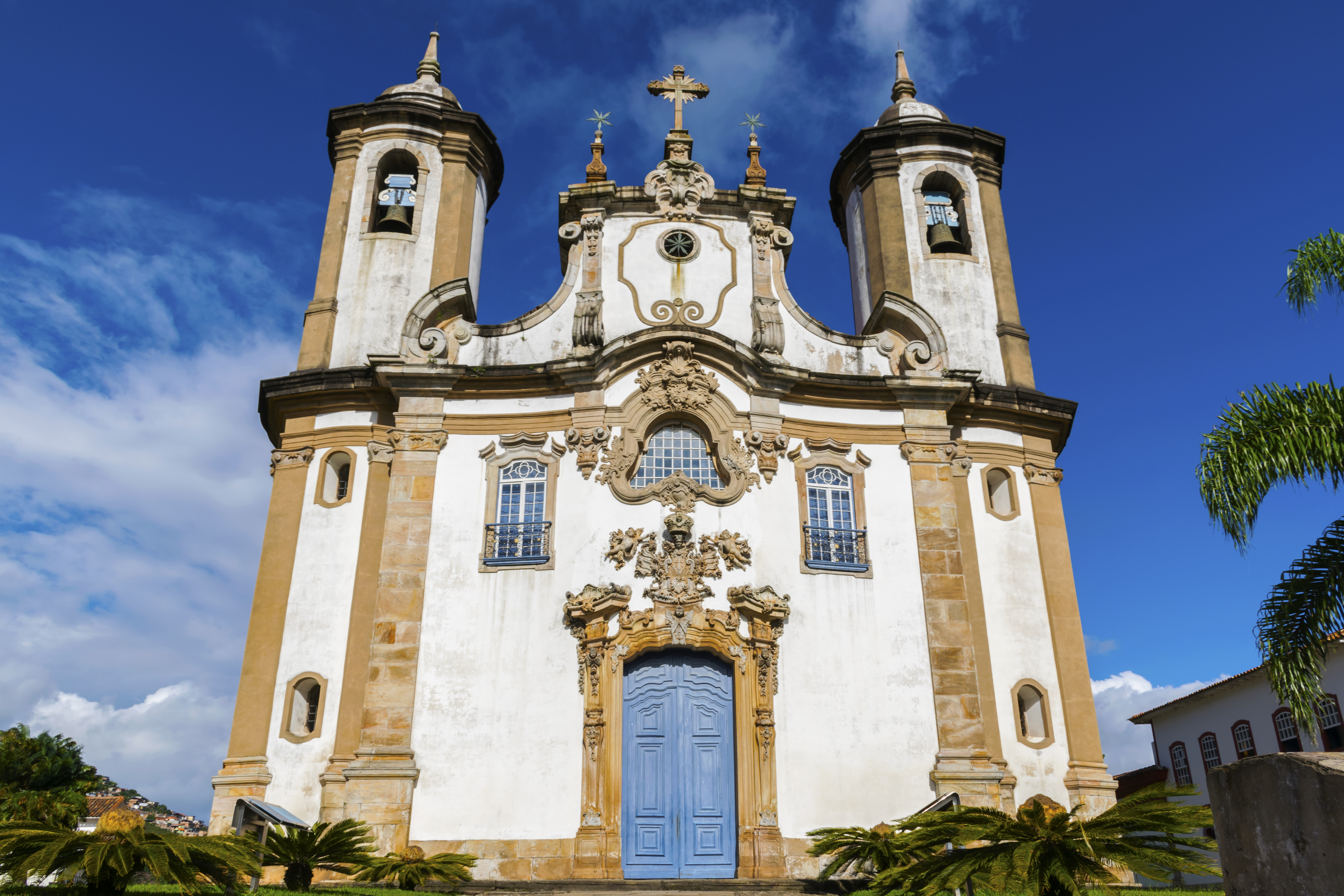
- Church of Our Lady of Mount Carmel
- 20°23′9.643″S 43°30′17.777″W
- Location: Ouro Preto, Minas Gerais, Brazil

History
- Founded: 1813

The Church of Our Lady of Mount Carmel (Portuguese: Igreja de Nossa Senhora do Carmo) is a Catholic church in the Brazilian city of Ouro Preto, and an important example of the Rococo tradition in Brazil. It is a listed monument by the National Institute Historic and Artistic Heritage (IPHAN).

== History ==
Its construction was the result of the initiative of the brothers from the Carmelite Order of Rio de Janeiro who had moved to the old Vila Rica, today Ouro Preto. In this village, they did not have a temple of their own for their devotions, gathering in the chapel of Saint Quiteria. In 1751, the devotees founded a brotherhood in Vila Rica, which started the project to build a church dedicated to Our Lady of Mount Carmel. The project was entrusted to Manuel Francisco Lisboa, who was a member of the Brotherhood, and the master builder was José Pereira dos Santos, who started work in 1756.

The construction work was interrupted several times due to conflicts with the Saint Quiteria Brotherhood, which donated the land. In 1767, the ground was not yet well prepared, but the foundations were already being laid. The builder João Alves Viana was then hired to effectively carry out the works. Viana started the masonry work in the main chapel, as was the custom at the time, while the old chapel of Saint Quiteria remained in use for the cult to continue. Viana completed the main chapel and the stonework of the doors and windows between 1767 and 1769. In 1771, when the chapel of Saint Quiteria was probably demolished, the carpentry was finished. Work on the nave extended until 1779, and in 1780, the stonework of the doorway, the sacristy toilet and the choir arch were finished by Francisco de Lima Cerqueira.

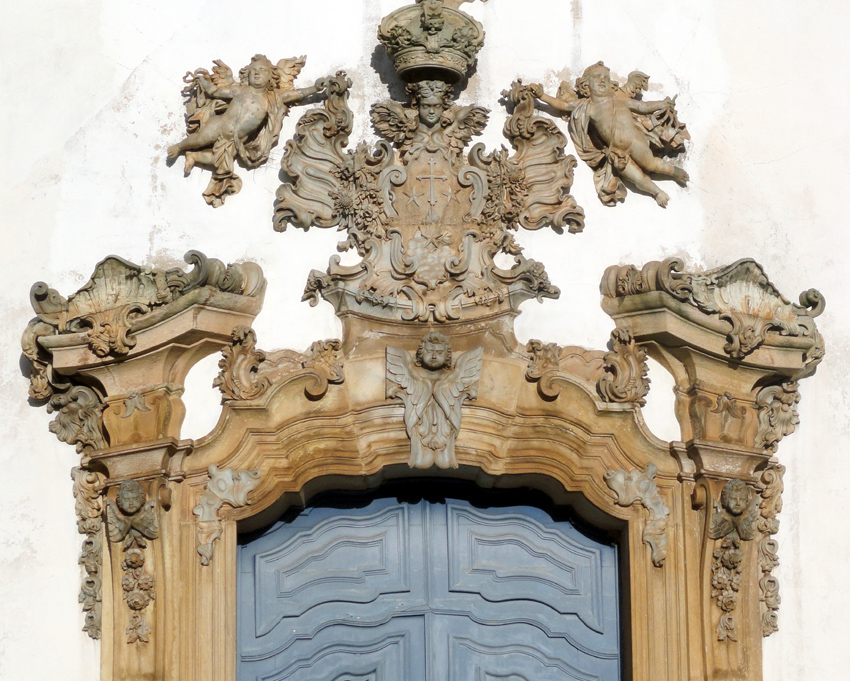
Detail of the frontispiece.

The carved stone frontispiece is assigned to Aleijadinho. The side altars were designed in 1779 by an unknown artist, and later João Nepomuceno Correia e Castro modified their layout. The main altar was designed by Mestre Ataíde, and the pulpits follow the project of João Gomes. The works of internal decoration were completed by Manuel Francisco de Araújo in 1784, but the renovations were carried out slowly, remaining until the early twentieth century.

By 1795, only the altars of Saint Quiteria and Saint Lucy, next to the cross arch, had been completed. The next two, dedicated to Saint John and Our Lady of Sorrows, were built by Aleijadinho and his assistants between 1807 and 1809. The other altars and the pulpits were made between 1812 and 1814 by Justino Ferreira de Andrade, disciple of Aleijadinho, and his team. The gilding and painting of the woodcarving were commissioned to Mestre Ataíde, who carried them out in 1813. In that year, Vicente da Costa began construction of the main altar, and also did the carving, completed in 1824, being gilded in 1825 by Ataíde. The paintings on the ceiling of the nave and chancel were done by the Italian Angelo Clerici and date from 1908 to 1909.

The church has some annexed buildings. The two-story house was built in 1753 to receive the novices and the Brotherhood's collection. Until 1942, it served as the dwelling of the Church's sacristans. There is also an old ground floor house next to the two-story house, built in 1755 to accommodate the Brotherhood's belongings. Today, these buildings house the Oratory Museum. Construction of the cemetery began in 1824 under the direction of Manuel Fernandes da Costa, later replaced by João Miguel Ferreira. In 1861, the project was altered by Henrique Gerber, who continued the work until 1868.

Throughout the 20th century, the church underwent several conservation and restoration works. In 1965, the cemetery wall was replaced with iron railings, when a new landscaping of the site was done, under a project by José Zanine.

== Structure ==
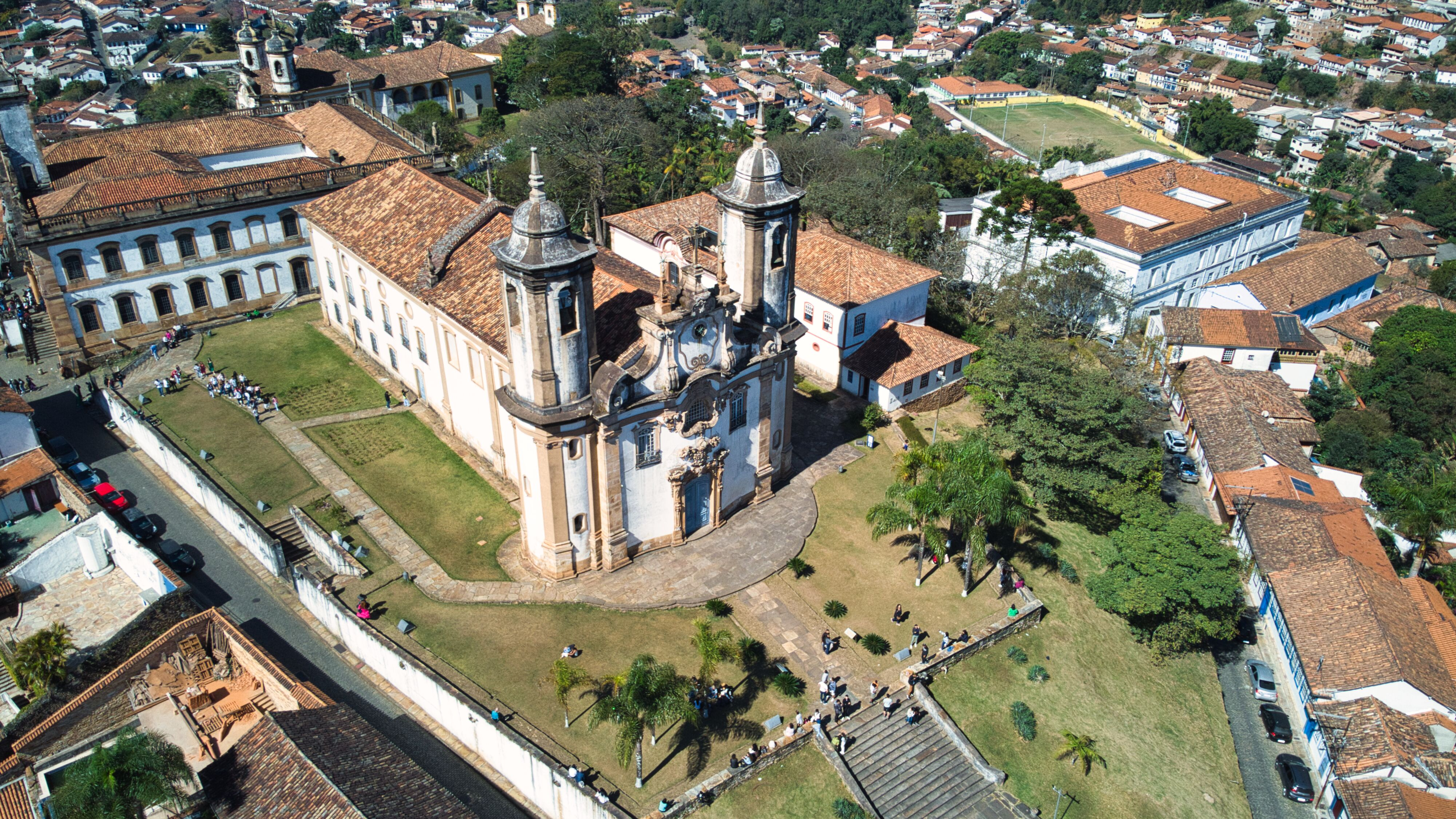
Area view of the Church of Our Lady of Mount Carmel and surroundings.

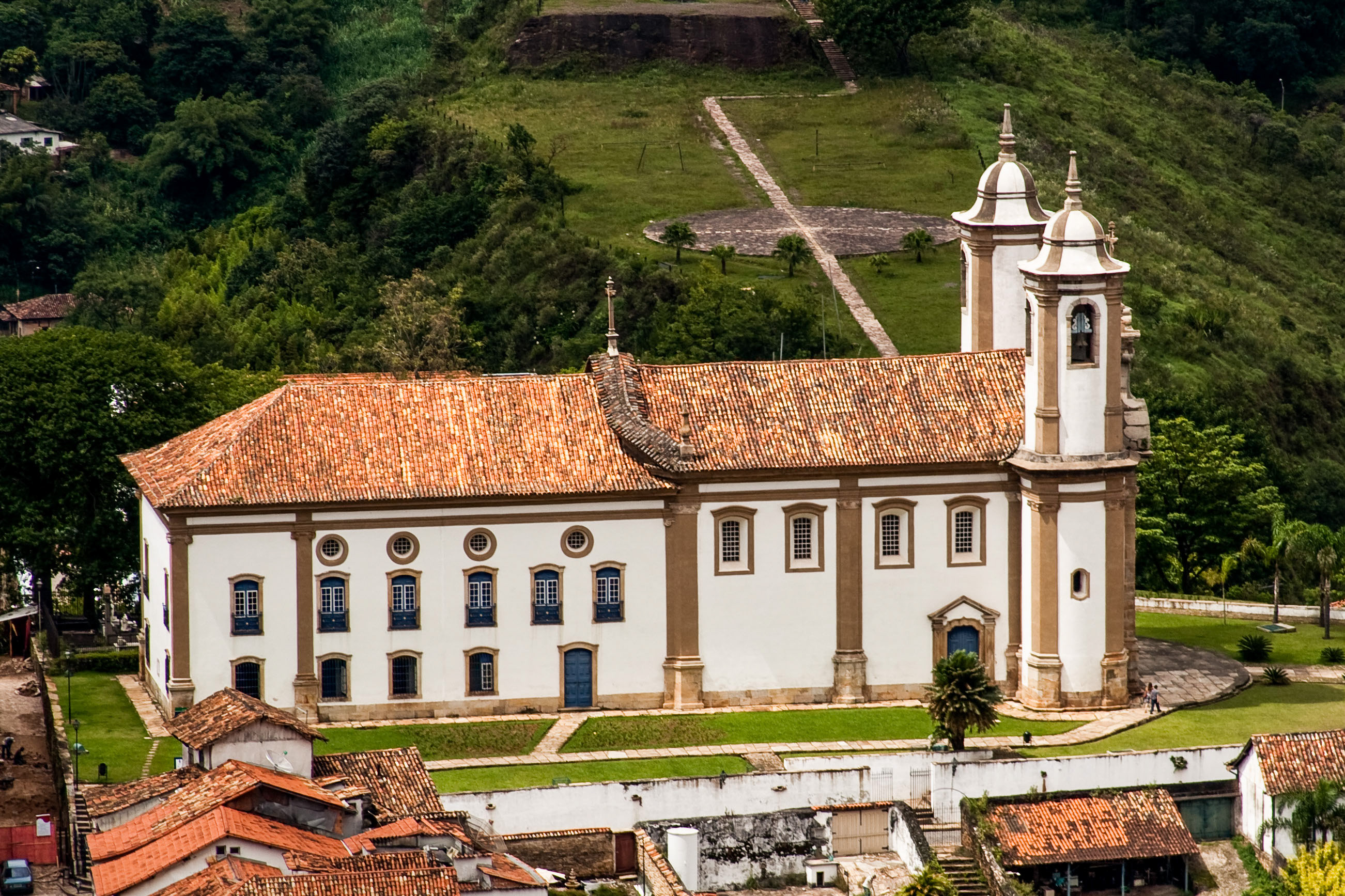
Side view.

The building's project was the last to be done by Manuel Francisco Lisboa, but later the layout would be changed several times, and it is speculated that Aleijadinho, the designer's son, may have participated in these modifications, which gave the original plan typical Rococo features. The facade has a gentle curvature, with a large central gateway crowned by a carved stone frontispiece. The two bell towers on the sides have a square section base which, in the upper sections, becomes an almost circular section, and are topped by bell-shaped corbels topped by pinnacles. The side facades have a regular series of arched lintel windows, over which are open mismatched oculus (four oculus for five windows).

The interior is divided into a single nave and a chancel. The wall of the cross arch is chamfered in three parts arranged at angles, where doors open into corridors leading to the sacristy, located at the back of the building, behind the chancel. The nave has a ceiling of sliding boards, with an undulation in the shape of a kanga, and six side altars; instead of the traditional tribunes on the upper level, windows are opened to provide ample illumination for the interior of the temple. In the chancel, the rostrums remain, flanking the main retable. The ceiling is vaulted.

== Decoration ==
The large frontispiece carved in soapstone, showing the coat of arms of the Order of Carmelites flanked by two cherubs and topped by the head of a third, which holds the crown of the Virgin, stands out on the facade. The frontispiece is traditionally attributed to Aleijadinho, but according to Germain Bazin, other craftsmen must have participated, especially in the parts of the doorposts, the eye window ornaments and the cherubic heads.

The interior has rich Rococo style decoration. In IPHAN's description,

The main altar, designed by Manuel da Costa Athaíde in 1813, as already mentioned, is an interesting example of rococo carving in Minas Gerais, in a different style from that introduced by Aleijadinho, who, according to Germain Bazin, is affiliated to the rococo from the cities of Braga and Porto, both in Portugal. In the altars of Saint John and Our Lady of Sorrows, Aleijadinho tried to respect the style of the preceding ones, adopting, however, the fluted columns, surrounded by spiral garlands and rocaille capitals. The urns of these two altars present sculpted reliefs that are perhaps the last works of Aleijadinho in this genre. The one in the altar of Saint John represents the prophet Jeremiah in prison, and the one of Our Lady of Sorrows, the patience of Job. Both reliefs are surrounded by inscriptions allusive to the theme. It is worth noting the incorporation of the pelmets introduced by Aleijadinho in all the other altars of the nave. As for the imagery, the great majority is composed of rattle images, such as the lateral images of the main altar (Saint Elijah and Saint Teresa) and the six images placed in the niches of the altars of the nave. Beautiful panels of tiles decorate the lower registers of the walls of the chancel, illustrating themes related to the iconography of the Order of Carmelites.

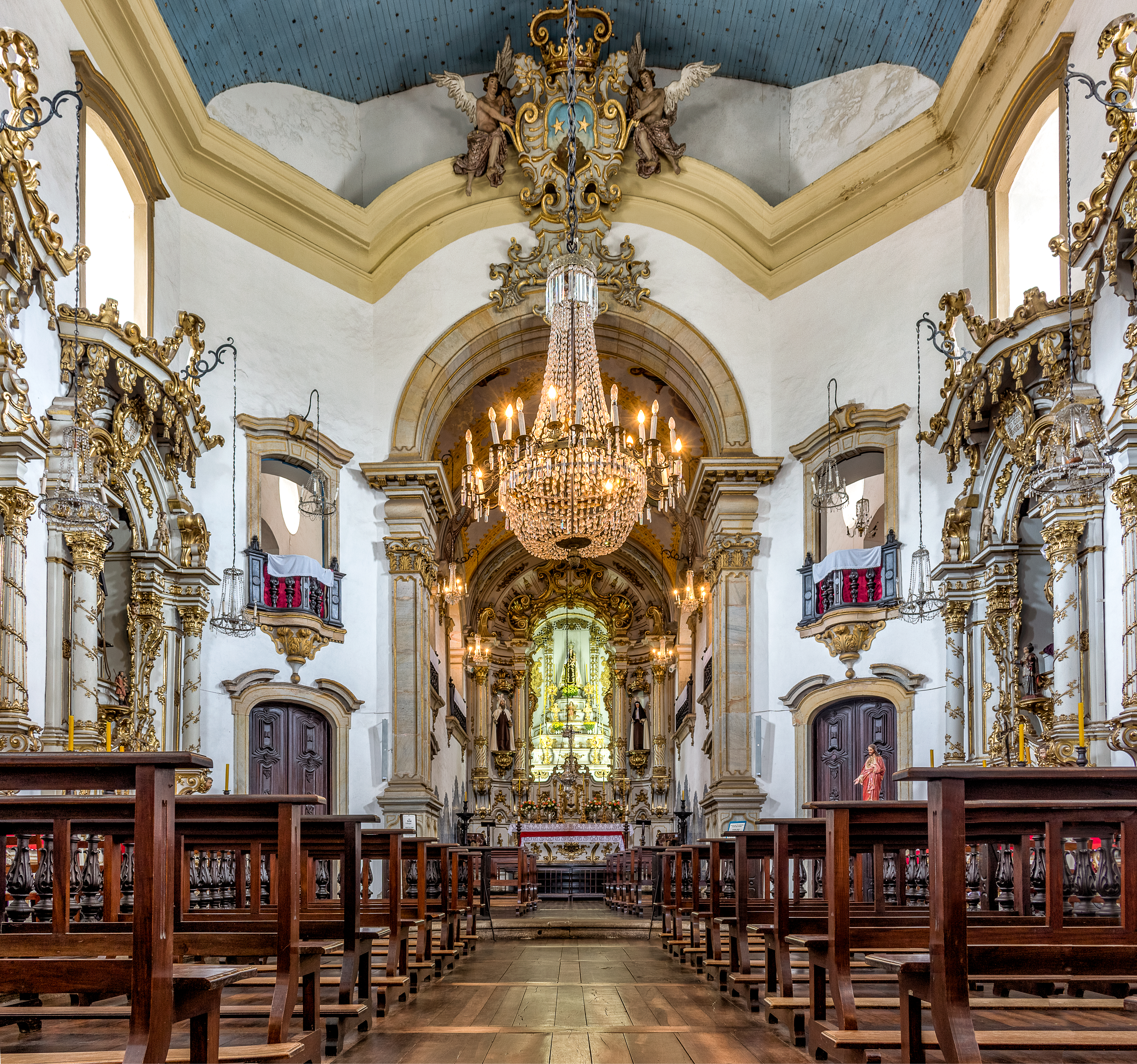
Inside view facing the altar.

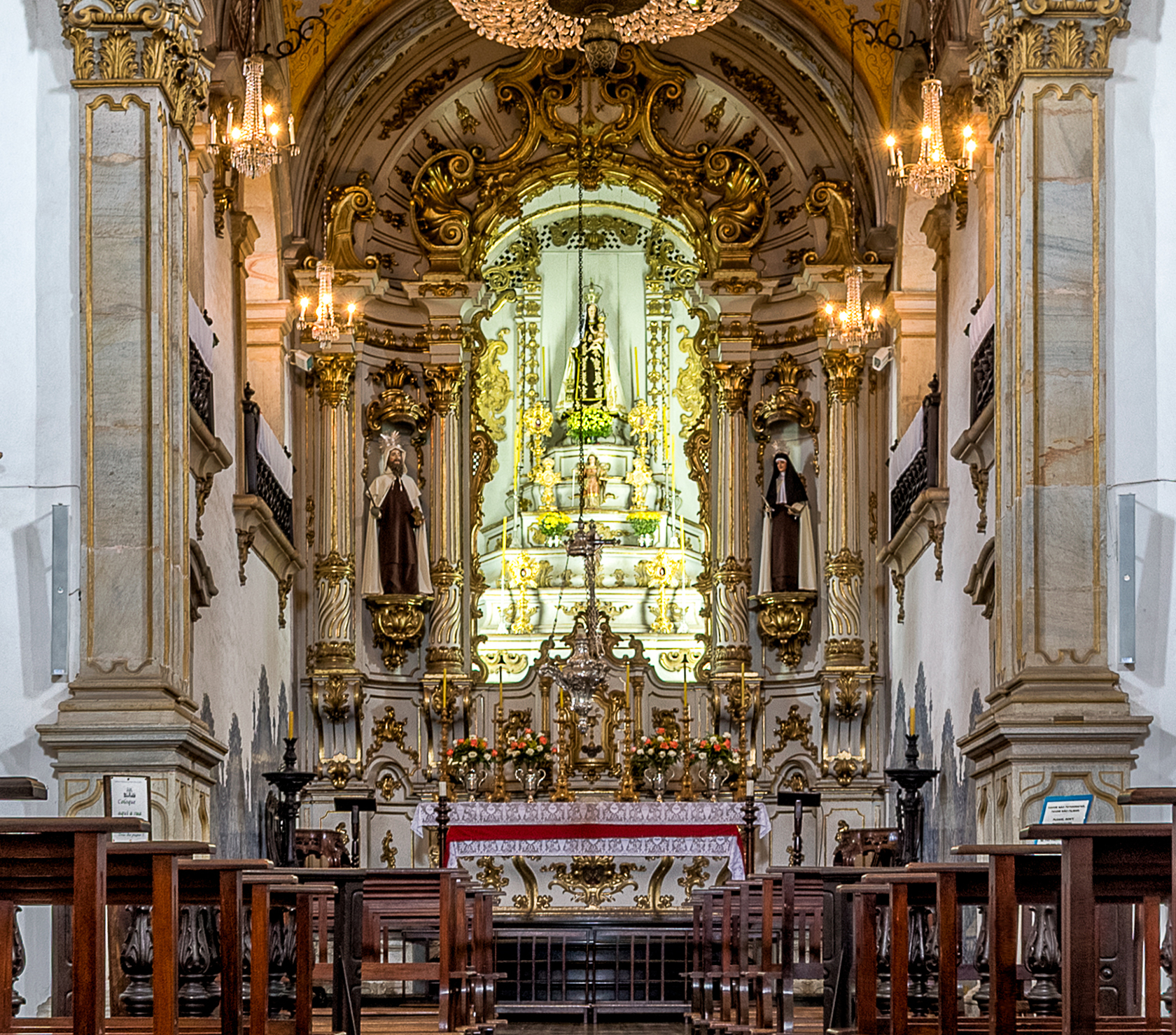
Altar.

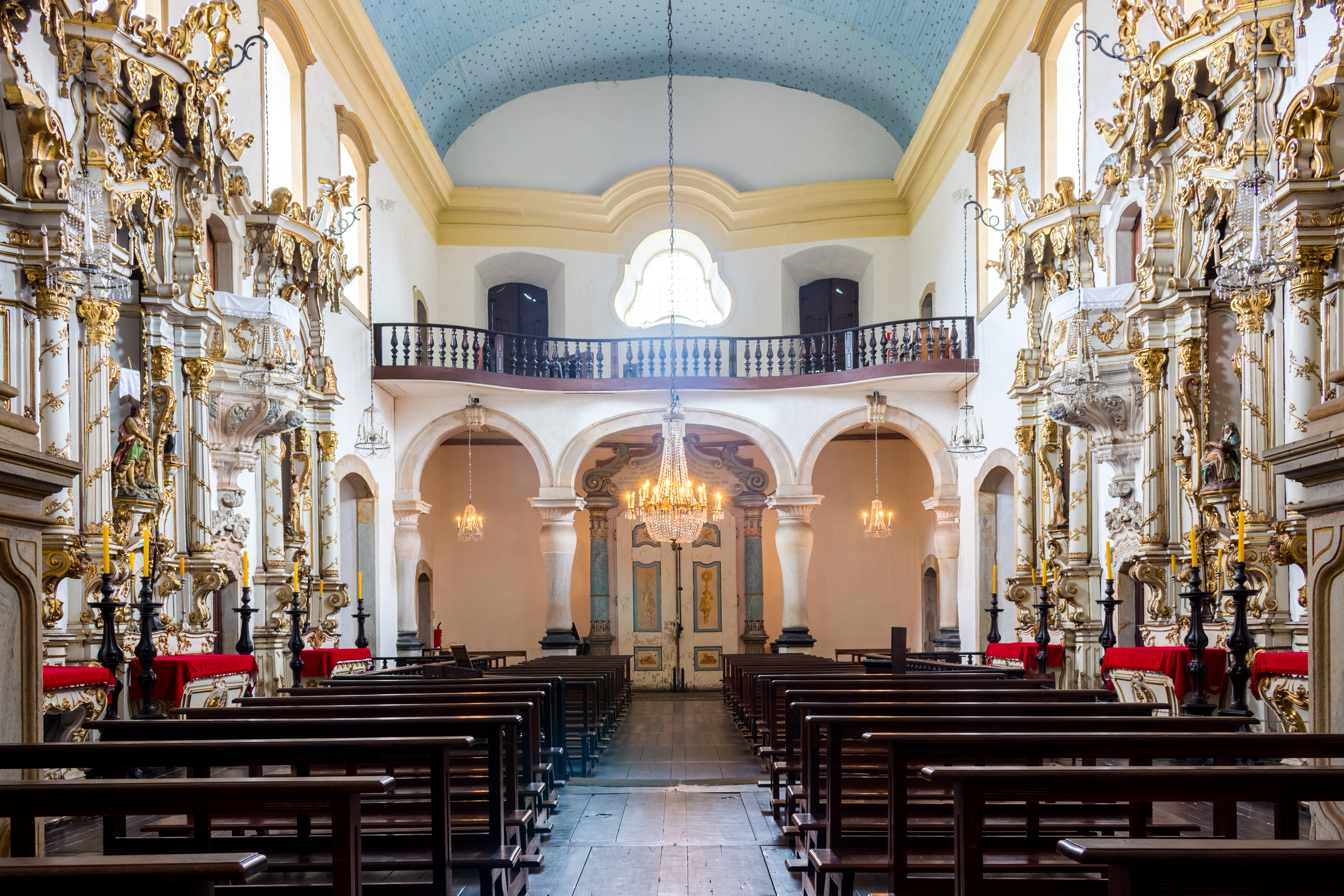
Inside view of the entrance.

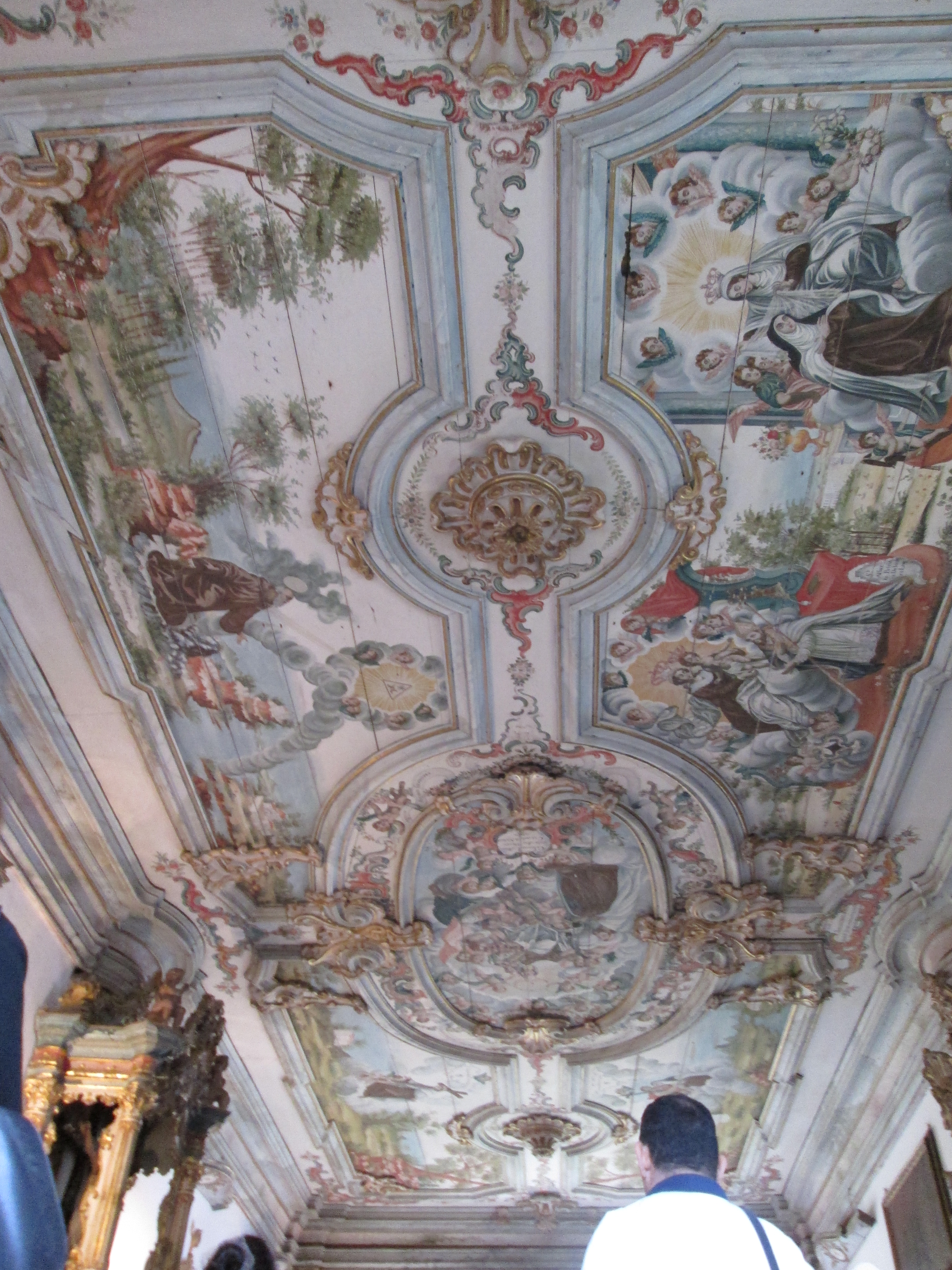
The decorated ceiling in the sacristy.

== See also ==
- Colonial architecture of Brazil
- Baroque in Brazil
