= Zé Pereira dos Lacaios =

Carnival block from Ouro Preto, Brazil

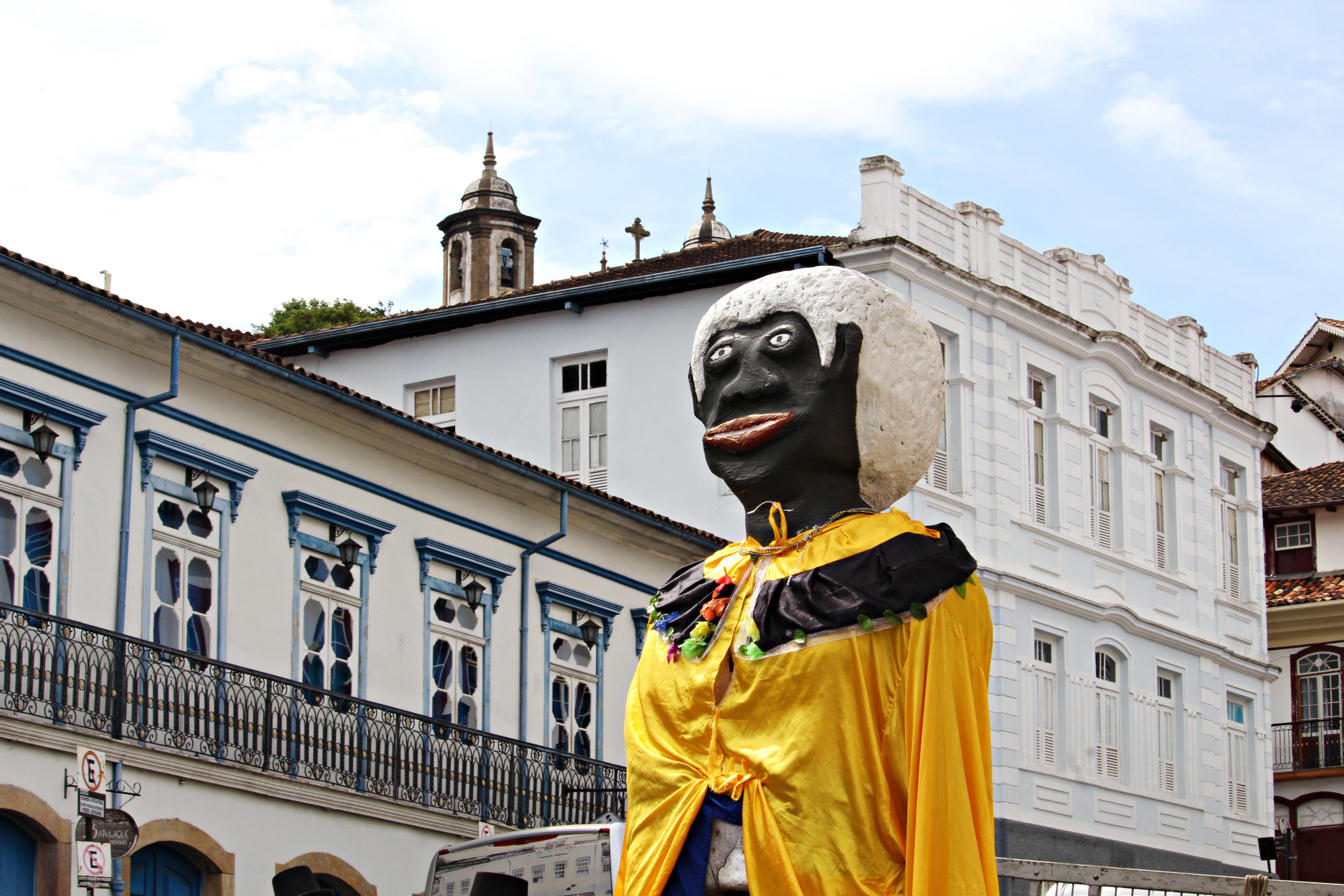
- Processional giant parading
- Full name: Bloco Zé Pereira do Clube dos Lacaios
- Foundation: 1867; 159 years ago
- Location: Ouro Preto
- President: Arthur Ramos Carneiro

Zé Pereira dos Lacaios is a carnival block from Ouro Preto, Brazil. Founded in 1867, it is one of the oldest carnival block in the country which is still active.

== History ==
The Portuguese shoemaker José Nogueira Paredes paraded at the first day of the 1846 carnival in the center of Rio de Janeiro. His block gained attention from enthusiasts, musicians and organizers for the carnival proceedings.

José relocated to Ouro Preto in 1867 to work at the local Governor's palace (the city was then the capital of Minas Gerais). Together with other workers from the palace, he created the block "Zé Pereira Clube dos Lacaios".

== The block ==
The use of smoking jackets, top hats and lanterns is a characteristic of the block since its inception.

Another characteristic are the gigantones. The first three where the characters Catitão, Baiana and Benedito. Later other gigantones were added, such as Tiradentes, Jair Boêmio and Sinhá Olímpia.

== See also ==
- Zé Pereira da Chácara
- Zé Pereira
