= Church of Our Lady of the Rosary of Black Men (Ouro Preto) =

Brazilian Catholic temple in Minas Gerais

- Igreja de Nossa Senhora do Rosário dos Homens Pretos
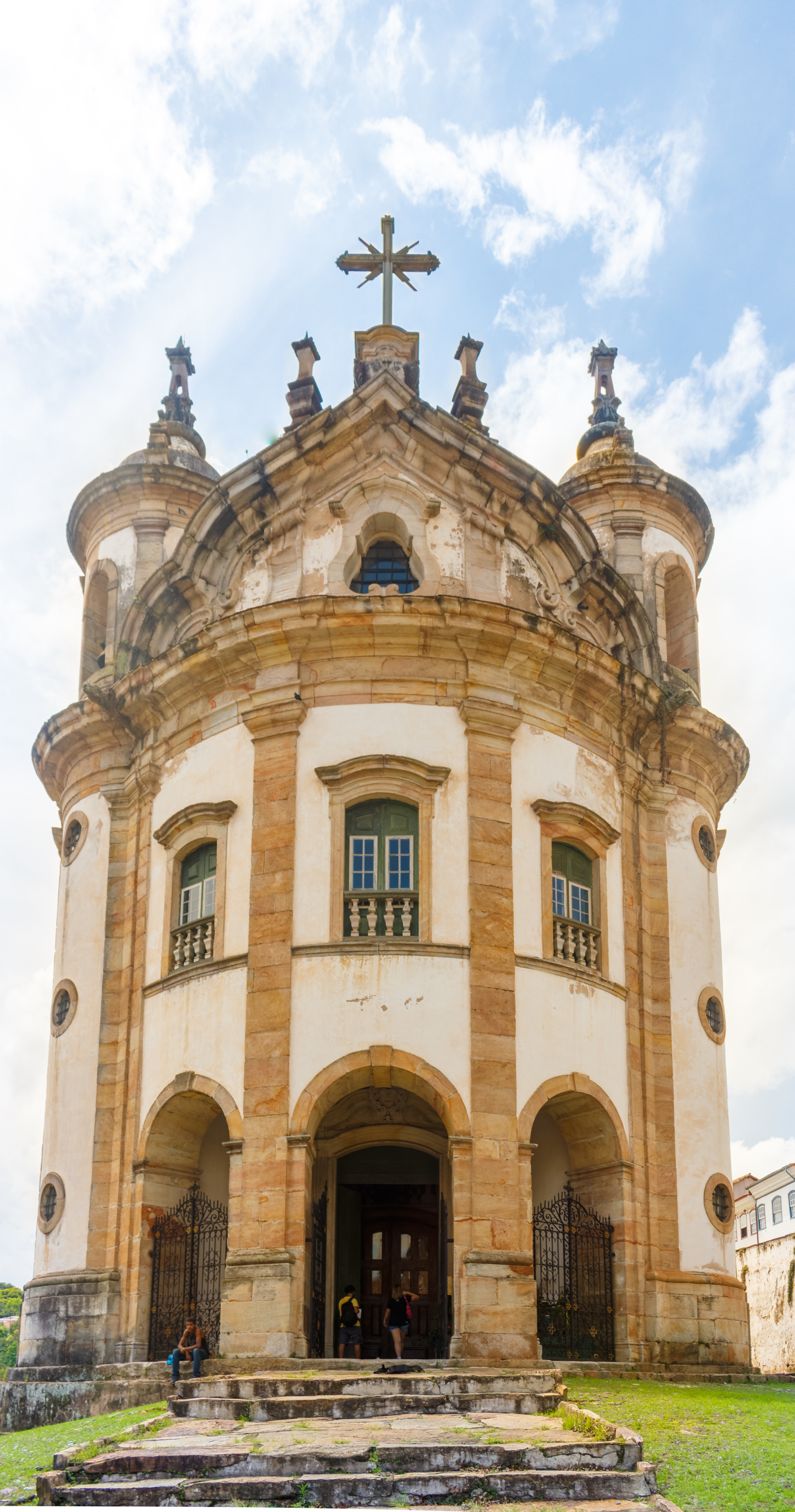

- Location of the Church of Nossa Senhora do Rosário dos Homens Pretos in Brazil

Religion
- Affiliation: Catholic
- Rite: Roman

Location
- Municipality: Ouro Preto
- State: Minas Gerais
- Country: Brazil
- Interactive map of Church of Our Lady of the Rosary of Black Men
- Coordinates: 20°23′01″S 43°30′36″W

Architecture
- Style: Baroque
- Completed: 1822-1823

The Church of Our Lady of the Rosary of Black Men (Portuguese: Igreja de Nossa Senhora do Rosário dos Homens Pretos), also known as the Church of Our Lady of the Rosary, is a Catholic temple in Ouro Preto, Minas Gerais, Brazil. Landmarked by IPHAN, it is one of the most original sacred buildings dating from the colonial period in Brazil.

== History ==
The church was founded by the Brotherhood of Nossa Senhora do Rosário dos Homens Pretos, which was established in 1715. At first, the Brotherhood did not have its own place of worship, and it operated next to the Parish Church of Nossa Senhora do Pilar. A year after it was founded, the members bought a chapel in the district of Kaquende, where they continued their devotions until 1733, when the Blessed Sacrament, which was kept there while the parish church was being renovated and operated as a parish church, was moved from the original chapel of the Rosário back to its home in Pilar. For the passage of the procession, a sumptuous festivity that became famous in local history, known as the Eucharistic Triumph (Portuguese: Triunfo Eucarístico), the Brotherhood of the Pretos created a street, known now as Getúlio Vargas street. In return for this favor, in 1753 it was granted permission for the construction of a more magnificent temple, and in 1761 the Town Council of Ouro Preto granted the Brotherhood a large plot of land in the surroundings of its chapel.

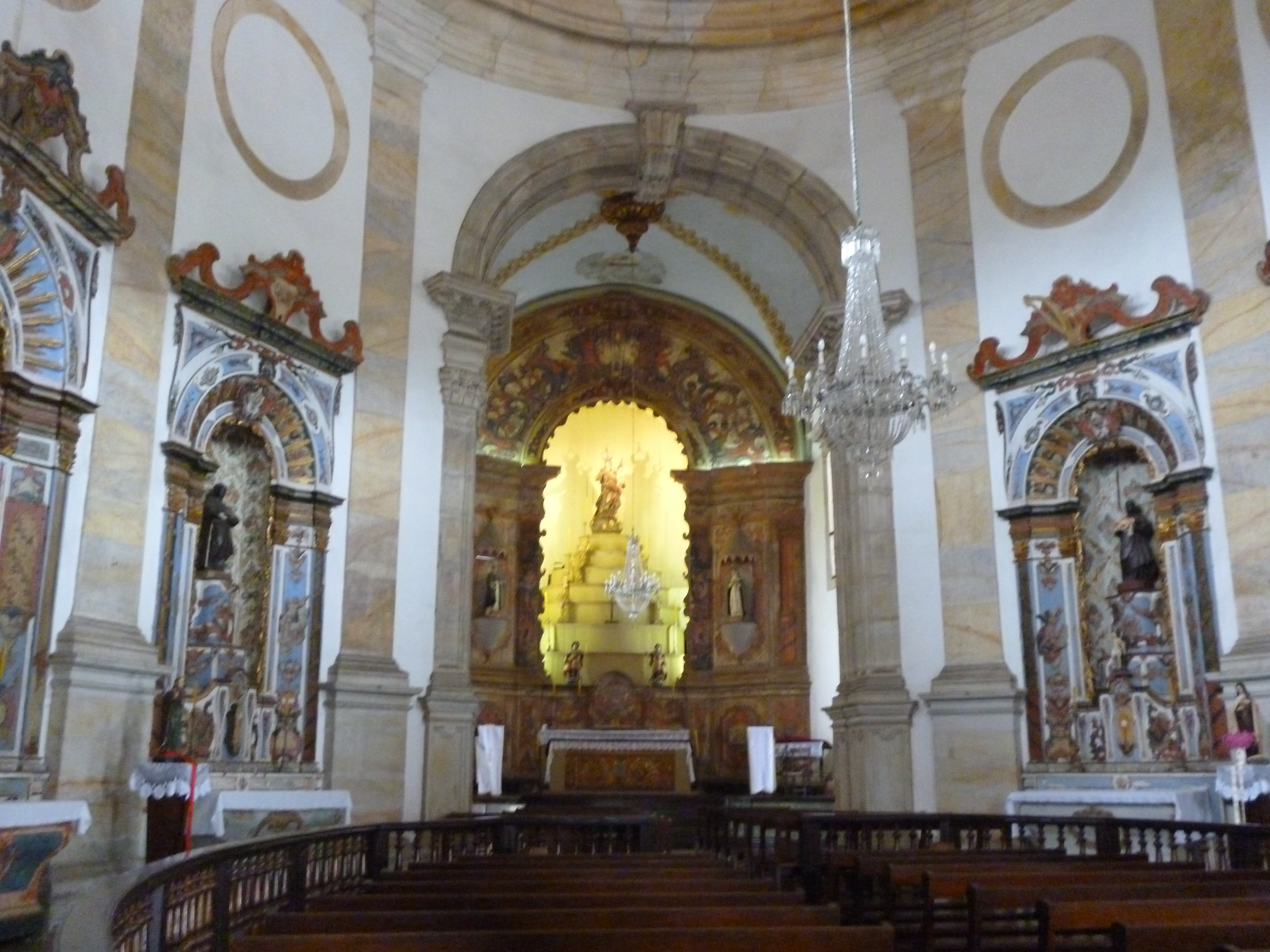
The church's nave.

Based on the historical testimony of José Joaquim da Silva, the project is attributed to Antônio Pereira de Sousa Calheiros, with the work entrusted to José Pereira dos Santos, but there is no reliable documentation on this matter and these attributions have been contested by recent studies. John Bury has stated that there have been good arguments that the design came from Portugal or Italy, and for some time it was thought that José Pereira Arouca was involved, but there is evidence to suggest that Manuel Francisco de Araújo was at least partly involved in the planning, and may indeed have been the author of the full design we see today. However, Bury also ponders that Araújo, known for being a carpenter, probably did not have the necessary qualifications to conceive of such a sophisticated and well-integrated project as this. On the other hand, he suggests that the design may be a derivation of architectural plans created in Italy and the Germanic region by authors such as Fischer von Erlach, Filippo Juvarra, Nicolau Nasoni and Carlo Andrea Rana.

It is unknown when the actual construction of the structure began, but it was probably underway soon after the land was received, in mid-1762, and there are signs that some modifications to the original project were being implemented, with the oculus being replaced by portals. A new design for the gable and the frontispiece was commissioned in 1784 by Araújo, and the work was completed in 1785 by José Ribeiro de Carvalhais, who also executed the towers, finishing this stage in 1793.

At this time the internal decoration was already well advanced, as it began in 1784 with the construction of two altars, a work of Manuel José Velasco. José Rodrigues da Silva built another five altarpieces from 1790 to 1792, painted and gilded by Manuel Ribeiro Rosa and José Gervásio de Sousa. Sousa also painted the apse from 1798 to 1799, the altars of Saint Anthony, Saint Benedict and Saint Ephigenia, and the panels of the sacristy from 1792 to 1794.

The churchyard was built in 1820 by Manuel Antônio Viana and José Veloso Carmo. The church was only completed in the years 1822–1823, when the choir, the windshield and the doors to the chancel were built. Several repairs were carried out in the 19th century. Others were carried out by the former National Monuments Inspectorate in the 1930s, adding an iron railing to close the galilee and 40 wooden benches in the nave, designed by José Wasth Rodrigues. The church is still linked to the Parish Church of Pilar as one of its communities.

== Aesthetic significance ==
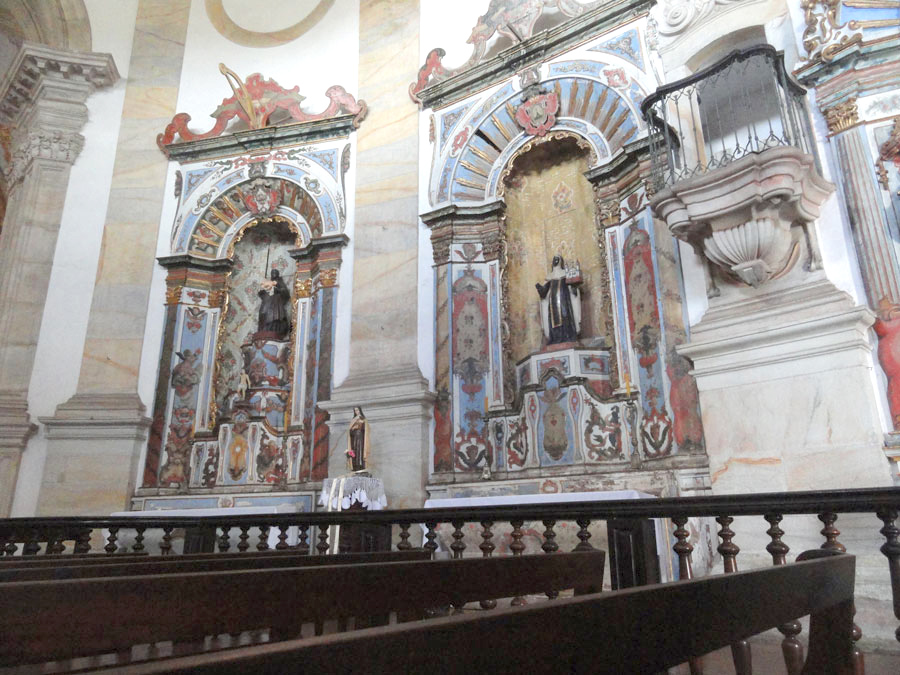
The side altars.

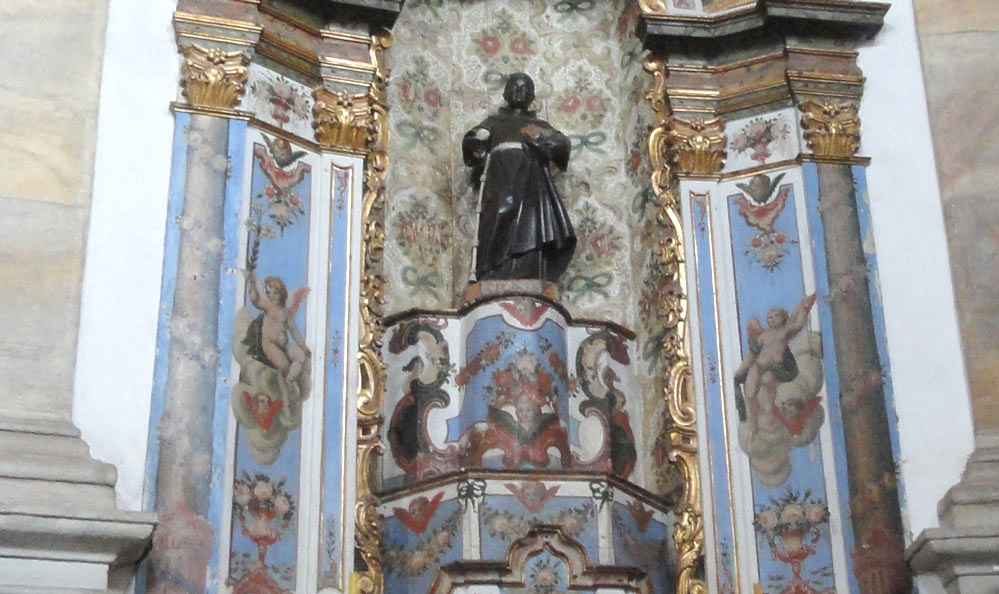
Closer look at one of the side altars.

The building is listed by the National Institute of Historical and Artistic Heritage, and as stated in its analysis,

"The Church of Nossa Senhora do Rosário is the highest expression of the colonial Baroque of Minas Gerais, according to experts. It has an elliptical floor plan, with aisles around the chancel and a quadrangular sacristy at the end. The cylindrical frontispiece has three arches on the first floor, three balcony doors on the second one and a three-lobed pediment at the top. The use of stonework is evident in the arcades, entablature, pediment, consoles and spires which, in contrast to the white of the pediment and the architrave that finishes the entablature, give the frontispiece an imposing effect.
"According to Paulo Ferreira Santos, the Church of Nossa Senhora do Rosário was influenced by the churches of São Pedro dos Clérigos in Porto and Rio de Janeiro, as well as the church of San Carlo alle Quattro Fontane by Francesco Borromini. The chain of influences also includes the Church of São Pedro dos Clérigos in Minas Gerais and São Francisco de Assis in Ouro Preto. Inside, the monumental character is confirmed by the architectural elements, such as the Tuscan pilasters that delimit the nave's internal space. However, the altars, built from 1784 to 1792 by Manuel Velasco and José Rodrigues da Silva, are extremely simple".

There is some controversy about its style, and it is sometimes classified as a Rococo building. John Bury, a great scholar of Brazilian colonial art, considers it a sui generis specimen in Minas Gerais architecture, where Rococo came to prevail, and comparing the Rococo and Mannerist styles, he said:

"Mário de Andrade tried to classify it as a transitional church, but in fact the importance and exceptionality of this building must be attributed precisely to the fact that it belongs neither to the Mannerist nor to the Rococo style, and even less to a transitional style between the two. On the contrary, it is a Baroque monument, representative of a brief phase of architecture in Minas Gerais, which until today has been little known and the target of many incorrect interpretations. [...]
"Although due attention has not yet been paid to the stylistic significance of this church, it is certain that Nossa Senhora do Rosário de Ouro Preto has always been recognized as a monument of major importance. [...]

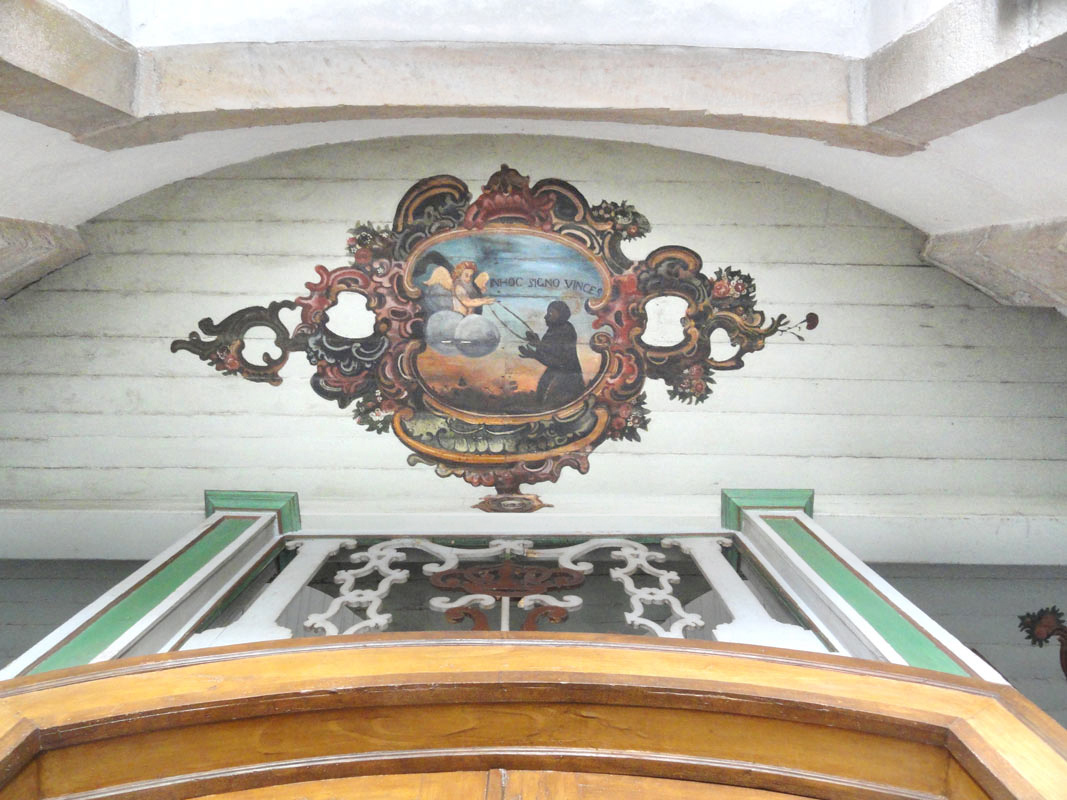
Atrium ceiling.

"In São Pedro in Mariana and the Rosário in Ouro Preto [...] a direct Central European influence seems to be clearly detectable. Although there is a great distance between the heavy proportions and dismal composition of São Pedro in Rio de Janeiro and the harmonious maturity of Nossa Senhora do Rosário in Ouro Preto, stylistically these two churches, along with São Pedro dos Clérigos in Mariana, constitute an isolated Baroque episode in the history of architecture in Brazil. Closely related, if not directly derived from Central European and Italian sources, it is an exotic episode, not only when it comes to Brazil, but in the entire Lusitanian world, only finding a parallel in the intervention of the Tuscan Nasoni in Porto".

Although the building bears Baroque features, the altars are typically Rococo. The internal decoration is quite simple but efficient, with altars built of wooden planks almost stripped of carvings, and ornaments provided through illusionist painting. The niches are mostly occupied by saints associated with black devotion, such as Saint Anthony of Nubia and Saint Benedict, whose images are attributed, without certainty, to the priest Antônio Félix Lisboa, Aleijadinho's half-brother. Saint Ephigenia, patron saint of slaves, and little-known saints, such as Saint Anthony of Catingeró, are also venerated. There is documentation that indicates the making of five wooden images by Manuel Dias da Silva e Sousa between 1800 and 1801, but no identification of them is made.

== See also ==
- Colonial architecture of Brazil
- Baroque architecture
- Rococo architecture
- Baroque in Brazil
- 18th-century Western domes
