= Alphonsus =

Alphonsus is a masculine given name and surname which may refer to:

== Given name ==
- Alphonsus Carroll (1895–1974), New Zealand dual-code international rugby union and rugby league footballer
- Alphonsus Cassell (1949–2010), aka Arrow (musician), Montserratian calypso and soca musician
- Alphonsus Ciacconius (1530–1599), Spanish Dominican scholar
- Alphonsus Cullinan (born 1959), Irish Roman Catholic prelate and Bishop of Waterford and Lismore
- Alphonsus Rick Doerr (born 1960), American Paralympic sailor
- Alphonsus J. Donlon (1867–1923), American Jesuit
- Alphonsus F. D'Souza (1939–2016), Indian Jesuit priest and Roman Catholic bishop
- Fonse Faour (born 1951), Canadian politician
- Alphonsus de Guimaraens (1870–1921), Brazilian poet
- Alphonsus Obi Igbeke (born 1962), Nigerian politician
- Alphonsus Gerald Irona, 21st century Nigerian politician
- Alphonsus Longgap Komsol, 21st century Nigerian politician
- Alphonsus Liguori (1696–1787), Roman Catholic Saint
- Alphonsus Mathias (1928–2024), Indian Roman Catholic archbishop
- Alphie McCourt (1940–2016), Irish-American writer
- Alphonsus Uche Mefor (born 1972), British-Nigerian pro-Biafra political activist
- Alphonsus Nwosu (born 1944), Nigerian politician, parasitologist, academic, administrator and former Minister of Health
- Alphonsus Liguori Penney (born 1924), Canadian Roman Catholic priest
- Alphonsus Josephus de Ridder (1882–1960), pen name Willem Elsschot, Belgian writer and poet
- Alphonsus Rodriguez (1532–1617), Spanish Jesuit and saint
- Alphonsus a Sancta Maria (1396–1456), Spanish historian
- Alphonsus Salmeron (1515–1585), Spanish biblical scholar, Catholic priest and one of the first Jesuits
- Alphonsus Augustus Sowada (1933–2014), American Roman Catholic bishop, cultural anthropologist and bishop
- Alonso Tostado (c. 1410–1455), also known as Alphonsus Tostatus, Spanish theologian, councillor of John II of Castile and briefly bishop of Ávila

== Surname ==
- Aniekeme Alphonsus (born 1999), Nigerian sprinter and middle-distance runner
- Joy Alphonsus (born 1987), Nigerian-born actress

== See also ==
- Petrus Alphonsi (or Petrus Alfonsus) (1062–1110), Spanish Jewish writer
- St. Alphonsus Church (disambiguation)
