= Alphonsus de Guimaraens Filho =

- Born: Afonso Henriques de Guimarães Filho; June 3, 1918; Mariana, Minas Gerais, Brazil
- Died: August 28, 2008 (aged 90); Rio de Janeiro, Brazil
- Education: Federal University of Minas Gerais
- Occupations: Civil server, journalist
- Writing career
- Period: 1940 - 2003
- Notable work: Nó (1984)
- Notable awards: Prêmio Jabuti for Poetry (1985)
- Movement: Modernism in Brazil

Afonso Henriques de Guimarães Filho (June 3, 1918 in Mariana – August 28, 2008 in Rio de Janeiro), better known as Alphonsus de Guimaraens Filho, was a Brazilian poet.

Son of the symbolist poet Alphonsus de Guimaraens, he was acknowledged by Carlos Drummond de Andrade as ''one of the purest voices ever heard in verse in Brazil''.

== Works ==
- Lume de estrelas, 1940
- A cidade do sul, 1946
- Poesias, 1946
- O irmão, 1950
- O mito e o criador, 1954
- Sonetos com dedicatória, 1956
- Novos poemas, 1968
- Poema da ante-hora, 1971
- Discurso no deserto, 1982
- Nó, 1984
- Luz de agora, 1991
- Todos os sonetos, 1996
- Só a noite é que amanhece, 2003
