= Antônio Ferreira Viçoso =

Brazilian Venerable

Venerable Antônio Ferreira Viçoso CM
- Bishop of Mariana
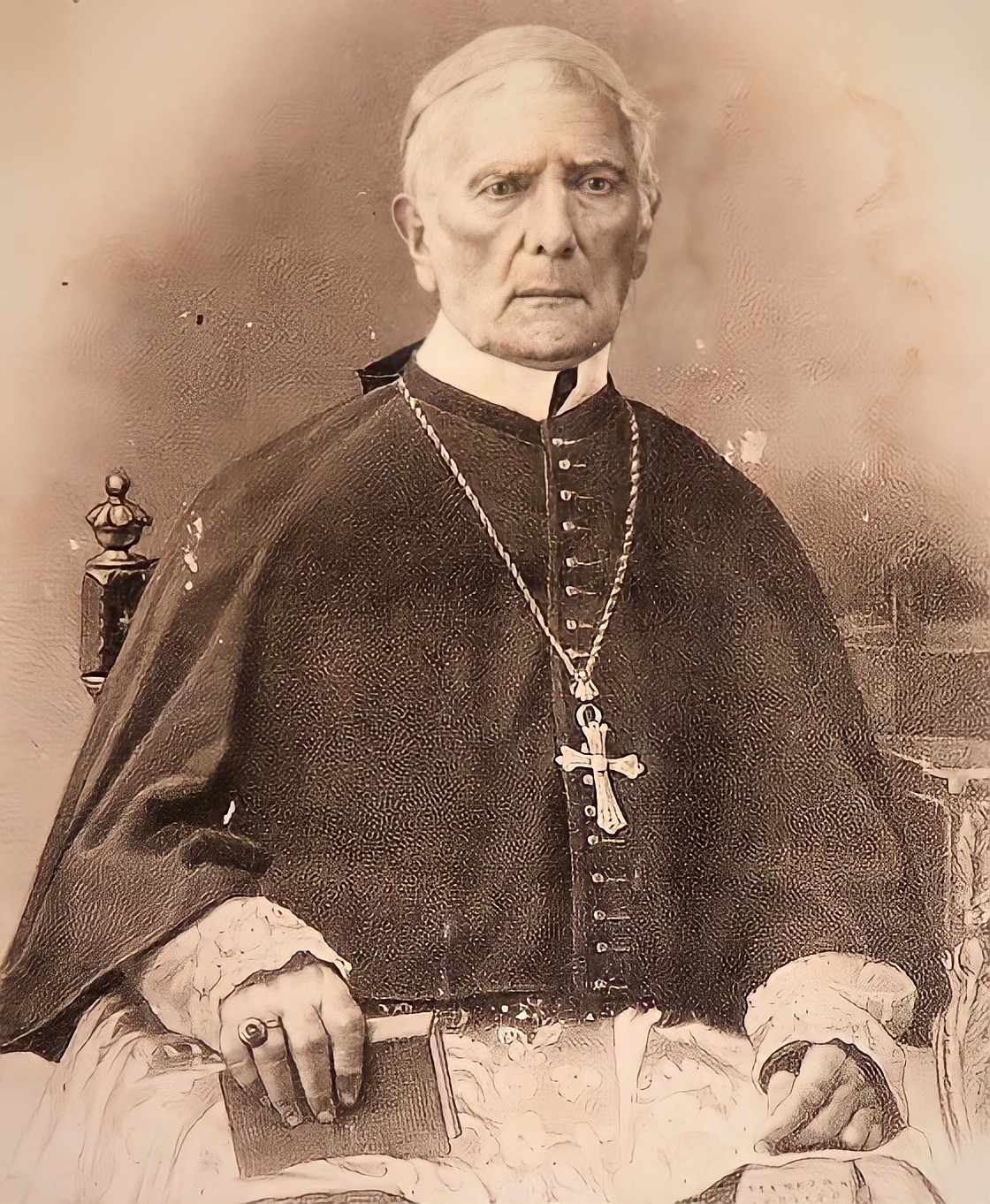
- Viçoso, c. 1870
- Church: Roman Catholic Church
- Diocese: Mariana
- See: Mariana
- Appointed: 15 July 1843
- Term ended: 7 July 1875
- Predecessor: Carlos Pereira Freire de Moura
- Successor: Antônio Maria Corrêa de Sá e Benevides

Orders
- Ordination: 7 March 1818
- Consecration: 5 May 1844 by Manoel de Monte Rodrigues de Araújo
- Rank: Bishop

Personal details
- Born: Antônio José Ferreira Viçoso; 13 May 1787 Peniche, Leiria, Kingdom of Portugal
- Died: 7 July 1875 (aged 88) Mariana, Minas Gerais, Empire of Brazil
- Buried: Cathedral Basilica of Our Lady of Assumption, Mariana
- Motto: Fides, spes et caritas ("Faith, hope and charity")
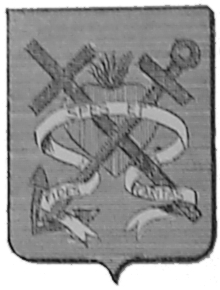
- Coat of arms: Antônio Ferreira Viçoso's coat of arms

Ordination history of Antônio Ferreira Viçoso
History
Episcopal consecration
- Principal consecrator: Manoel de Monte Rodrigues de Araújo
- Co-consecrators: Pedro de Santa Mariana e Souza & José Affonso de Moraes Torres
Episcopal succession
Bishops consecrated by Antônio Ferreira Viçoso as principal consecrator
- Luiz Antônio dos Santos: 14 April 1861
- João Antônio dos Santos: 1 May 1864
- Pedro Maria de Lacerda: 10 January 1869

Antônio José Ferreira Viçoso (13 May 1787 – 7 July 1875) was a Portuguese religious priest of the Congregation of the Mission. He served as bishop of Mariana from 1843 until his death. He relocated to Brazil prior to his episcopal appointment where he worked to establish the ecclesial institutions on a solid basis and opposed government efforts to control the ecclesial workings that he believed were under the domain of the episcopal superiors while he also was attentive to the needs of the poor in his diocese. In the face of strong opposition he ordained the first black slave ever to become a priest who was Blessed Francisco de Paula Victor.

His patron was Pedro II who titled him the "Count of Conceição" and made him an Imperial Counselor. Pedro II held the bishop in high esteem enough to the point that the two were collaborators and that Pedro II had granted him the Imperial Order of Christ and gave him the rank of officer of the Imperial Order of the Rose.

The cause for his beatification commenced after the bishop had died and culminated in 2014 after he was titled as venerable once Pope Francis confirmed Viçoso's life of heroic virtue.

== Life ==
Antônio José Ferreira Viçoso was born in mid-1787 in Peniche in the Kingdom of Portugal to Jacinto Ferreira Viçoso and Maria Gertrudes; his paternal grandparents were Francisco Ferreira Viçoso and Joana Maria while his maternal grandparents were Luis dos Remédios and Joana Francisca.

In 1796 his father entrusted him to the Carmelite friars for his initial education. In 1802 he felt drawn to service as a priest and so commenced his studies for that in Santarém. He studied there until 1809 after which he returned to his home.

During his time back home he examined his future course in life and at last felt a call to enter the Congregation of the Mission. He enrolled in their institute as a seminarian in the Rilhafoles sector of Lisbon on 11 July 1811 to prepare himself for his ordination and began his novitiate with the order on 25 July. He received his ordination to the priesthood on 7 March 1818 after which he was sent to teach philosophical studies to seminarians at the order's institute in Évora.

In 1819 he was assigned to establish his order in Brazil which was then part of the Portuguese empire. He arrived alongside a companion - Leandro Rebelo Peixoto e Castro - in 1820 and the two settled in the Minas Gerais province. It was there that the pair founded the Colégio do Caraça and another in Jacuecanga before establishing another later in Angra dos Reis. He also assisted in a number of parishes throughout the province. He spent almost two decades in these ministries, until he was appointed in 1837 as the first superior of the order's newest ecclesiastical province in Brazil.

His patron and friend Pedro II nominated for the office of Bishop of Mariana on 15 July 1843 and this received official papal confirmation from Pope Gregory XVI on 22 January 1844. He then received his episcopal consecration as a bishop from Manoel de Monte Rodrigues de Araújo - the Archbishop of Rio de Janeiro - on 5 May 1844 at the Nossa Senhora do Monserrate in Rio de Janeiro. The new bishop first focused on the reform of the education seminarians were receiving in order to bring it into line with the mandates of the Council of Trent on the formation of prospective priests. To accomplish this he entrusted its operation to colleagues in his order in keeping with one of the goals of their congregation. He was an ultramontane and sought to establish the independence of the Roman Catholic Church from the efforts of the imperial court of Brazil to dominate it.

In a controversial case he became the first bishop to accept a black slave as a candidate for the priesthood and when he was called upon in 1849 to consider the desire of Blessed Francisco de Paula Victor to pursue this calling he chose to break all precedent and overrule canon law in accepting him as a seminarian. In the process he risked jeopardizing the position of the ecclesial authorities in a social landscape in which possessing slaves was still legal and formed a crucial part of the Brazilian economic enterprise. He himself ordained the former slave in 1851.

In 1854 he sent a letter to Pope Pius IX after the latter proclaimed the dogma of the Immaculate Conception while Viçoso praised the pope for the move in his letter to him. He admired Saint Anthony of Lisbon and Saint Teresa of Ávila while striving to base his episcopal mission on the example of Saint Alphonsus Maria de' Liguori. The bishop created the parish of São Sebastião de São Gotardo on 19 July 1872 and he also oversaw the construction of new schools and kindergartens. On 7 March 1868, his patron Pedro II titled him as the "Count of Conceição" and also made him an Imperial Counselor. The relationship between the pair was great enough to the point that Pedro II also granted Viçoso with the Order of the Rose (with the rank of officer) and the Order of Christ.

He died in his residence in mid-1875. The Archbishop of Mariana Silvério Gomes Pimenta - also the late bishop's godson - wrote a biographical of his predecessor.

== Beatification process ==
The process for Viçoso's beatification was initiated in Mariana on 16 July 1916 during World War I and later oversaw its successful conclusion on 22 February 1922. But Archbishop Silvério Gomes Pimenta's death in August 1922 put a halt to the cause which was not re-opened before 1985. The Congregation for the Causes of Saints under Pope John Paul II issued the official nihil obstat to the cause which would allow for its resumption. The archdiocese opened a diocesan process in 1985 which concluded on 10 October 1986. Pope Francis confirmed on 8 July 2014 that Viçoso had lived a life of heroic virtue and so named him as venerable. The postulator for this cause is Shijo Kanjirathamkunnel.
