= Luciano Mendes de Almeida =

Servant of God Luciano Pedro Mendes de Almeida SJ
- Archbishop of Mariana
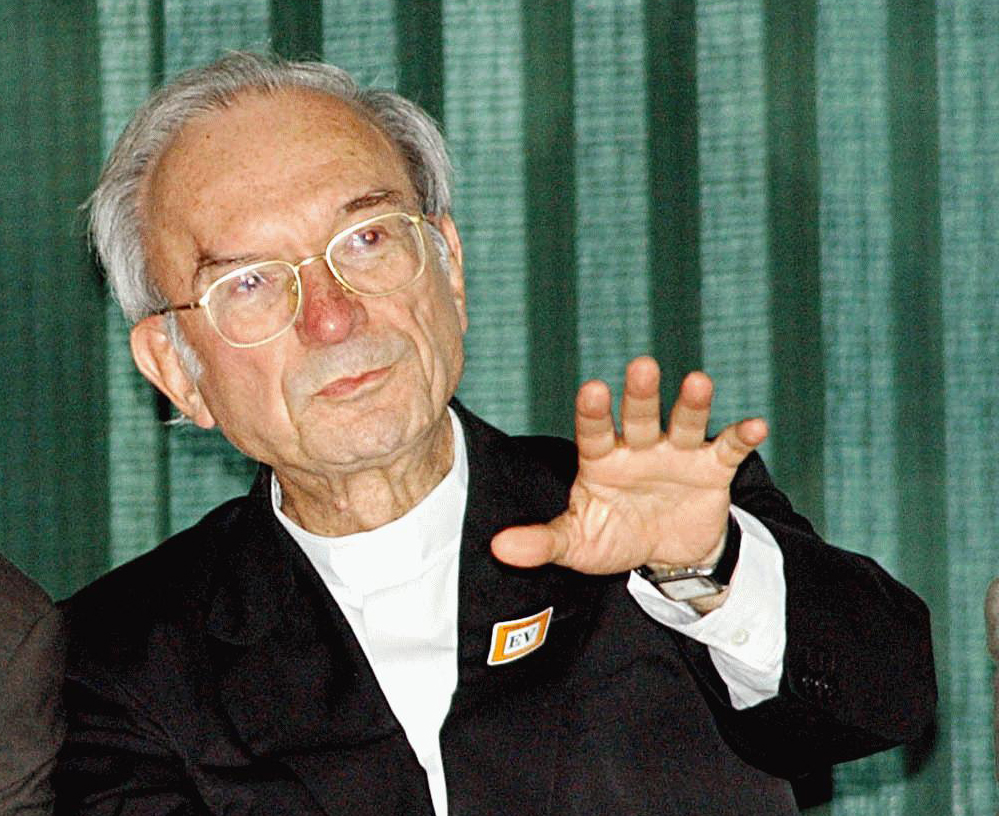
- The archbishop on 13 May 2003.
- Church: Roman Catholic Church
- Archdiocese: Mariana
- See: Mariana
- Appointed: 6 April 1988
- Term ended: 27 August 2006
- Predecessor: Oscar de Oliveira
- Successor: Geraldo Lyrio Rocha
- Previous posts: Titular Bishop of Turris in Proconsulari (1976-88); Auxiliary Bishop of São Paulo (1976-88); Secretary General of the Brazilian Episcopal Conference (1979-87); President of the Brazilian Episcopal Conference (1987-95); First Vice-President of the Latin American Episcopal Conference (1995-99)

Orders
- Ordination: 5 July 1958 by Luigi Traglia
- Consecration: 2 May 1976 by Paulo Evaristo Arns

Personal details
- Born: Luciano Pedro Mendes de Almeida; 5 October 1930 Rio de Janeiro, Brazil
- Died: 27 August 2006 (aged 75) São Paulo, Brazil
- Buried: Cathedral Basilica of Our Lady of Assumption, Mariana
- Education: Pontifical Gregorian University
- Motto: In nomine Jesu ("In the name of Jesus")

Ordination history of Luciano Mendes de Almeida
History
Priestly ordination
- Ordained by: Luigi Traglia
- Date: 5 July 1958
- Place: Rome, Italy
Episcopal consecration
- Principal consecrator: Paulo Evaristo Arns
- Co-consecrators: Clemente José Carlos Isnard; Benedito de Ulhôa Vieira
- Date: 2 May 1976
- Place: São Paulo, Brazil
Episcopal succession
Bishops consecrated by Luciano Mendes de Almeida as principal consecrator
- Jacyr Francisco Braido, CS: 30 April 1995
- Alessio Saccardo, SJ: 6 April 2002
- José Geraldo da Cruz, AA: 16 August 2003
- Armando Bucciol: 17 April 2004

Luciano Pedro Mendes de Almeida (5 October 1930 – 27 August 2006) was a Brazilian Jesuit who served as the Archbishop of Mariana from 1988 until his death. He was a noted pastor passionate about the defence of human rights and for the participation of the faithful in ecclesial affairs; he oversaw the establishment of retirement homes and facilities for disabled people during his tenure as archbishop.

In 2011 calls were made for his cause for beatification to be introduced and the national episcopal conference made a formal application to officials in Rome to commence the cause. The start to the cause saw the late archbishop titled as a Servant of God.

== Life ==
Luciani Pedro Mendes de Almeida was born in Rio de Janeiro on 5 October 1930. He received his First Communion on 8 September 1937.

His initial schooling was spent at the Colégio Santo Inácio in Rio de Janeiro. He entered the Jesuits on 2 March 1947 and then underwent his ecclesial studies first at Nova Friburgo from 1951 to 1953 (at the Colégio Anchieta) and then at the Pontifical Gregorian from 1955 until 1959 for his theological studies. His philosophical course at the Gregorian spanned from 1960 to 1965 and he earned his doctorate in Thomism. He received his ordination to the priesthood in Rome on 5 July 1958, and made his solemn profession as a Jesuit on 15 August 1964. He mastered Latin and Italian during his studies as well as English while also learning Spanish and German.

Mendes de Almeida served after his ordination as a professor in the philosophical department in a school back in Brazil from 1965 until 1972. In 1976 he was made an auxiliary bishop of the Archdiocese of São Paulo, where he founded Pastoral do Menor, to help children and adolescents from the outskirts of São Paulo. He served in various capacities in the Brazilian Episcopal Conference and was vice president of the Latin American Episcopal Conference from 1995 to 1998.

He was a vocal advocate for human rights and democratic freedom while serving in the two conferences. He offered his support to the embattled Bishop Pedro Casaldaliga after the bishop had been summoned to Rome to be interviewed about his association with Leonardo Boff and his leftist views as the Vatican perceived them. Mendes de Almeida was present in 1980 at the funeral of the slain archbishop Óscar Romero.

In 1988 he was appointed Archbishop of Mariana. He prioritized himself on greater investment in the media including the creation of the Archdiocesan Department of Communication while also dedicating himself to the greater formation and participation of the faithful. He wrote a weekly column for the Folha de S. Paulo newspaper, Brazil’s largest, focusing largely on human rights. He likewise sought the multiplication of retirement homes and facilities for disabled people. It had been rumored prior to his appointment that he would become the next Archbishop of São Salvador de Bahia but was sent to Mariana instead. But he was calm at his appointment and said that "I am at peace" even though some considered his move to Mariana instead of São Salvador da Bahia was a lack of papal consideration on the part of Pope John Paul II.

Mendes de Almeida served as a member of the Pontifical Council for Justice and Peace and worked alongside its head Cardinal Văn Thuận with the prelate later expressing thanks for having had the "great grace to have met him". The archbishop offered his resignation to Pope Benedict XVI on the eve of turning 75 but the pope turned the offer down and asked that he continue in his position.

He died on 27 August 2006. His remains were flown out to Belo Horizonte and then transported via vehicle to Mariana for the funeral which Cardinal Cláudio Hummes presided over.

== Beatification process ==
On 4 May 2011 his successor in Mariana requested that the national episcopal conference consider lodging a petition to the Congregation for the Causes of Saints to initiate the cause for beatification for the late archbishop; the conference announced in June the formal application would be made that August. The transfer of the forum for the local investigation of the process was made on 5 November 2011 from São Paulo (where he died) to Mariana. The Congregation approved the application and issued the edict declaring nihil obstat ("nothing against") while titling Mendes de Almeida a Servant of God on 13 May 2014. The diocesan phase of investigation opened on 27 August 2014 in Mariana and concluded on 15 June 2018.
