= Saint Alphonsus =

Saint Alphonsus may refer to the following Roman Catholic saints:

- Alphonsus Liguori, founder of the Redemptorists and devotional writer
- Alphonsus Rodriguez, Spanish-born widower, Jesuit lay brother

== See also ==
- St. Alphonsus Church (disambiguation)
