= Francisco de Paula Victor =

Afro-Brazilian Catholic priest

Blessed Francisco de Paula Victor
- Born: 12 April 1827; Campanha da Princesa da Beira, Minas Gerais, Empire of Brazil
- Died: 23 September 1905 (aged 78); Três Pontas, Minas Gerais, Brazil
- Venerated in: Roman Catholic Church
- Beatified: 14 November 2015, Três Pontas, Minas Gerais by Cardinal Angelo Amato, SDB
- Major shrine: Basilica of Nossa Senhora d'Ajuda, Três Pontas, Minas Gerais, Brazil
- Feast: 23 September

Francisco de Paula Victor (12 April 1827 – 23 September 1905) was an Afro-Brazilian Catholic priest. He is known in Brazil as the "Apostle of Charity" for his charitable treatment of the poor. He is the first black Brazilian national to be beatified in the Catholic Church and the first slave-turned-priest to be considered for canonization.

He was beatified on 14 November 2015 in Brazil; Cardinal Angelo Amato presided over the Mass on behalf of Pope Francis, who approved his beatification the previous June.

== Life ==
=== Early life ===
Victor was born on 12 April 1827 in the town of Campanha da Princesa da Beirathe (now the City of Campanha), then part of the Empire of Brazil, to a slave, Lourença Justiniana de Jesus, and an unknown father. He was baptized on the following 20 April. His godmother was his mother's owner, Marianna Santa Barbara Ferreira, who was known for her treatment of her slaves with dignity.

Under the tutelage of Ferreira, Victor learned how to read and write in addition to learning the French language and the nuances of the piano. Victor was apprenticed to a tailor but his sole desire was to become a priest, which his mother held as being unthinkable; even more so as black men had never become priests. This was a prospect that others around him were quick to shoot down. Additionally, there was an obstacle to this under church law as a child born out of wedlock. His owner approached the town pastor, Antonio Felipe de Araújo, who supported Victor in this quest. He invited the local bishop, Antônio Ferreira Viçoso, C.M., the Bishop of Mariana, to come meet the boy and determine if he would waive these impediments to his pursuing Holy Orders.

The bishop made a positive determination in his favor and Victor began his seminary studies in Mariana under the guidance of his pastor from 5 June 1849, having been given his freedom by his owner. Once there, however, he endured much discrimination from his fellow seminarians, being treated like a slave and assigned chores from polishing the shoes of the other seminarians to mopping the floors. One seminarian recognized later his merits: "Victor was patient, always patient" while another wrote that "Victor always had hope". It was because of his humble nature as well as his sheer determination to become a priest that he managed to win the sympathy of all.

=== Pastor ===
Victor was ordained to the priesthood on 14 June 1851 by Viçoso – himself now honored as Venerable – to the surprise of his fellow seminarians. Much of the population did not accept that a former black slave could be a priest and so refused to receive the Blessed Sacrament from him. A year later he was sent by the bishop to serve as the vicar of the Parish in Três Pontas, where he would serve until his death, soon succeeding the pastor after his death. He was met at the outset with both confusion and anger by the white, slave-owning elite of the town who comprised a third of the population, the rest being slaves. At Masses he celebrated, he was subjected by the white parishioners to offensive jokes and other humiliations hurled at him. Despite this, he was resolute in preaching the Word of God and in fulfilling his duties as a parish priest.

Victor was humble and patient and his determination in parish affairs led to much support from the public. Victor lived on donations alone and lived in a simple farmhouse where he soon became known for his humble and charitable nature to all those whom required aid. One of the initiatives that he led was the establishment of the College of the Holy Family (Sagrada Familia). It was open to all children, regardless of race, and there he taught children music and the French language, as he had himself once learned, and also instructed them in the catechism of the Catholic faith. Eventually he built the Church of Nossa Senhora d'Ajuda (Our Lady of Help), which was the largest church in the state and is now honored as a minor basilica.

Victor died on 23 September 1905 after suffering a stroke. After his remains lay in state for a period of three days due to the widespread mourning, he was buried in his parish church.

== Veneration ==
The cause for Victor's beatification was opened by the Diocese of Campanha, to which Três Pontas now belongs, after the Congregation for the Causes of Saints approved its opening on 10 August 1992. Two local processes opened from 1993 to 1995 and in 1998. Both were validated on 18 December 1998. His remains were exhumed in 1999 as part of the beatification process after which they were re-buried in a new sarcophagus in the church.

The positio for Victor's beatification was submitted by the diocese to the Holy See in 2002 for evaluation. Pope Benedict XVI proclaimed Victor to be Venerable in 2012 after the recognition of his life of heroic virtue. A miracle attributed to his intercession was investigated and declared to be such by the theological experts of the Vatican on 17 October 2013. This was approved by Pope Francis on 5 June 2015 and allowed for his beatification, which took place on 14 November 2015. Cardinal Angelo Amato, SDB, Prefect of the Congregation for the Causes of Saints presided over the beatification ceremony – on behalf of the pope – on 14 November 2015 in Victor's former parish church.

The cause now proceeds to seek Victor's canonization. The postulator of the cause is Paolo Vilotta.
