= Archdiocese of Mariana =

Latin Catholic jurisdiction in Brazil

Coordinates: 20.3782°S 43.4164°W

Archdiocese of Mariana Archidioecesis Marianensis Arquidiocese de Mariana

Catholic
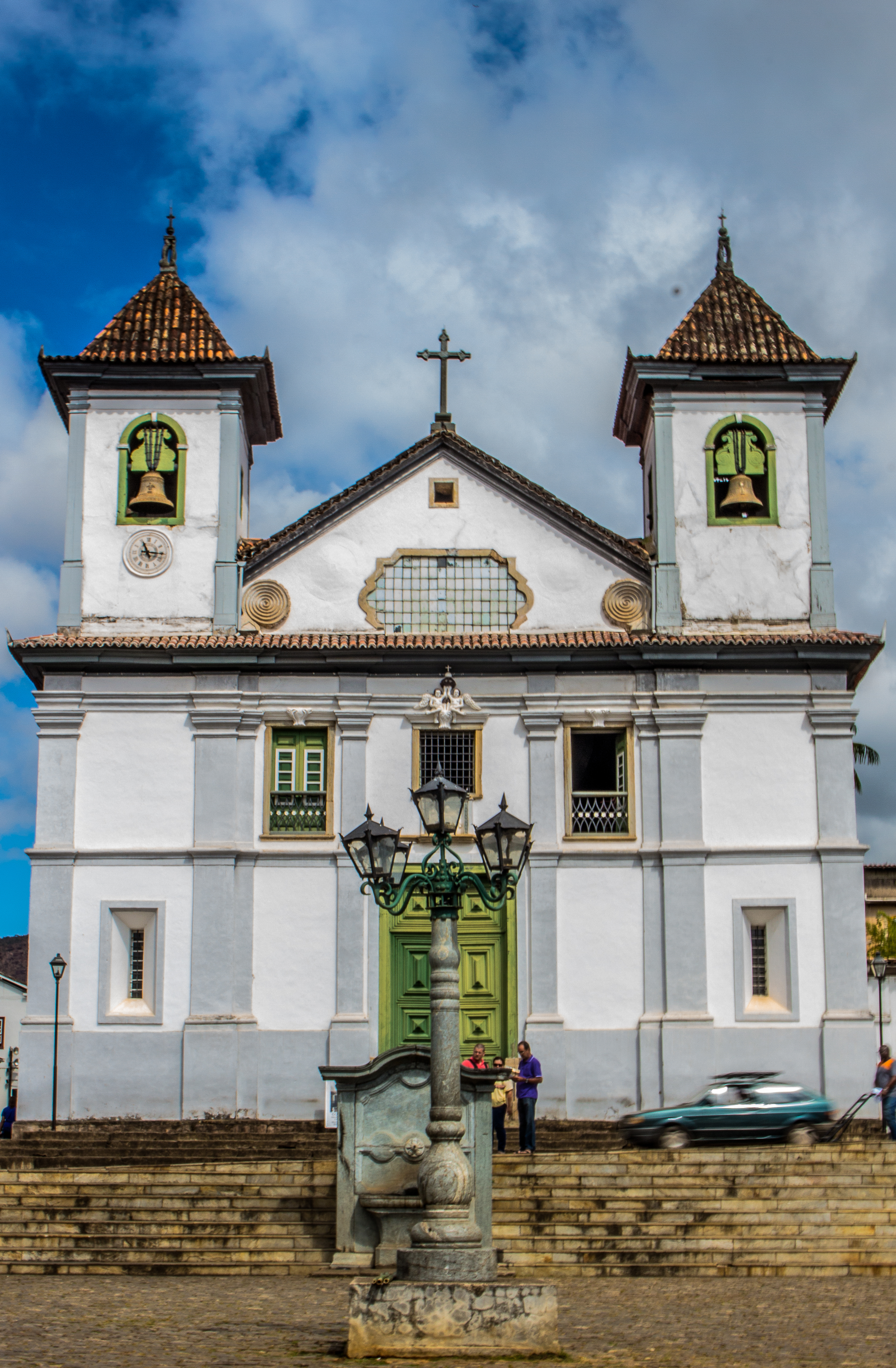
- Cathedral Basilica of Our Lady of Assumption, Mariana

- Coat of arms

Location
- Country: Brazil

Statistics
- Area: 22,680 km^{2} (8,760 sq mi)
- Population: Total; Catholics: (as of 2013); 1,274,000 (est.); 1,069,000 (est.) (83.9%)

Information
- Denomination: Catholic Church
- Sui iuris church: Latin Church
- Rite: Roman Rite
- Established: 6 December 1745 (280 years ago)
- Cathedral: Catedral Metropolitana Basílica Nossa Senhora da Assunção
- Secular priests: 171 (diocesan); 24 (Religious Orders)

Current leadership
- Pope: Leo XIV
- Archbishop: Airton José dos Santos

Website
- www.arqmariana.com.br

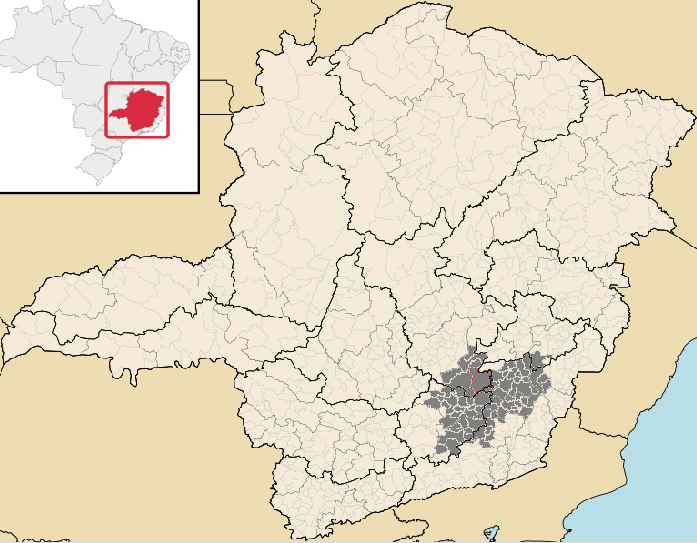
Map of the Archdiocese of Mariana

The Archdiocese of Mariana (Latin: Archidioecesis Marianensis, Portuguese: Arquidiocese de Mariana) is a Latin Church archdiocese of the Catholic Church based in the city of Mariana in the Brazilian state of Minas Gerais.

== Geography ==
The archdiocese owns the parishes in seventy-nine municipalities in four main regions in the state of Minas Gerais.

- Intermediate Geographic Region of Belo Horizonte
- Intermediate Geographic Region of Barbacena
- Intermediate Geographic Region of Juiz de Fora
- Intermediate Geographic Region of Ipatinga

== History ==
On 6 December 1745, the Diocese of Mariana was established with territory taken from the Diocese of São Sebastião do Rio de Janeiro.

In 1748, after being released from prison, formerly enslaved prostitute Rosa Egipcíaca began to preach to crowds about her religious visions. In 1749, she was accused of witchcraft by the Bishop of Mariana and whipped as a punishment. This punishment paralysed the right side of her body for the rest of her life. She became the first black woman in Brazil to write a book, entitled Sagrada Teologia do Amor Divino das Almas Peregrinas.

On 1 May 1906, it was promoted to Metropolitan Archdiocese of Mariana. By 2013, there was one priest for every 5,482 Catholics.

== Special churches ==
- Minor Basilicas:
  - Catedral Basílica Nossa Senhora da Assunção, Mariana
  - Basílica do Senhor Bom Jesus, Congonhas do Campo
  - Basílica Sagrado Coração de Jesus, Conselheiro Lafaiete
  - Basílica São José Operário, Barbacena
  - Basílica de Nossa Senhora do Pilar, Ouro Preto

== Bishops ==
=== Ordinaries, in reverse chronological order ===
- Archbishops of Mariana, below
  - Airton José dos Santos (2018.04.25 – currently)
  - Geraldo Lyrio Rocha (2007.04.11 – 2018.04.25)
  - Luciano Mendes de Almeida, S.J. (1988.04.06 – 2006.08.27)
  - Oscar de Oliveira (1960.04.25 – 1988.04.06)
  - Helvécio Gomes de Oliveira, S.D.B. (1922.11.10 – 1960.04.25)
  - Silvério Gomes Pimenta (1906.05.01 – 1922.09.01)
- Bishops of Mariana, below
  - Silvério Gomes Pimenta (later Archbishop) (1897.12.03 – 1906.05.01)
  - Antônio Maria Corrêa de Sá e Benevides (1877.06.25 – 1896.07.15)
  - Antônio Ferreira Viçoso, C.M. (1844.01.12 – 1875.08.05)
  - Carlos Pereira Freire de Moura (1840 – 1840)
  - José da Santíssima Trindade Leite, O.F.M. (1819.09.27 – 1835.09.28)
  - Cypriano de São José, O.F.M. (1797.07.24 – 1817.08.14)
  - Domingos da Encarnação Pontevel, O.P. (1779.03.01 – 1795.06.16)
  - Bartolomeu Manoel Mendes dos Reis (孟主教) (1773.03.08 – 1778.08.28)
  - Joaquim Borges de Figueroa (later Archbishop) (1771.06.17 – 1773.03.08)
  - Manoel da Cruz Nogueira, O.Cist. (1745.12.15 – 1764.01.03)

=== Coadjutor bishops ===
- Helvécio Gomes de Oliveira, S.D.B. (1922)
- Oscar de Oliveira (1959-1960)

=== Auxiliary bishops ===
- Silvério Gomes Pimenta (1890-1896), appointed Bishop here
- Modesto Augusto Vieira (1914-1916)
- Antônio Augusto de Assis (1918-1931) (appointed Archbishop (personal title) when appointed Auxiliary Bishop here); appointed Archbishop (personal title) of Jaboticabal, São Paulo
- Daniel Tavares Baeta Neves (1947-1958), appointed Bishop of Januária, Minas Gerais

=== Other priests of this diocese who became bishops ===
- João Antônio dos Santos, appointed bishop of Diamantina, Minas Gerais in 1863
- Silvério Gomes Pimenta, appointed Auxiliary Bishop of Mariana, Minas Gerais in 1890
- Joaquim Silvério de Souza, appointed Coadjutor Bishop of Diamantina in 1901
- Prudêncio Gomes da Silva, appointed Bishop of Goias in 1908
- Modesto Augusto Vieira, appointed Bishop of São Luíz de Cáceres, Mato Grosso in 1911
- José Maria Parreira Lara, appointed Bishop of Amazonas on March 27, 1924, and then Bishop of Santos, São Paulo on December 18, 1924
- Aristides de Araújo Porto, appointed Coadjutor Bishop of Montes Claros, Minas Gerais in 1931
- Carlos Carmelo de Vasconcellos Motta, appointed Auxiliary Bishop of Diamantina, Minas Gerais in 1932; future Cardinal
- Rodolfo das Merces de Oliveira Pena, appointed Bishop of Barra (do Rio Grande), Bahia in 1935
- Geraldo de Proença Sigaud, S.V.D., appointed Bishop of Jacarezinho, Parana in 1946
- Daniel Tavares Baeta Neves, appointed Auxiliary Bishop of Mariana, Minas Gerais in 1947
- José Alves de Sá Trindade, appointed Bishop of Bomfim, Bahia in 1948
- Oscar de Oliveira, appointed Coadjutor Bishop of Pouso Alegre, Minas Gerais in 1954
- Jose Nicodemes Grossi, appointed Bishop of Bom Jesus da Lapa, Bahia in 1962
- José Francisco Versiani Velloso, appointed Bishop of Itumbiara, Goias in 1966
- José Heleno, appointed Coadjutor Bishop of Governador Valadares, Minas Gerais in 1976
- Hélio Gonçalves Heleno, appointed Bishop of Caratinga, Minas Gerais in 1978
- Geraldo Majela Reis, appointed Bishop of Três Lagoas, Mato Grosso do Sul in 1978
- Getúlio Teixeira Guimarães, S.V.D., appointed Auxiliary Bishop of Ponta Grossa, Paraná in 1980
- Aloísio Hilário de Pinho, F.D.P., appointed Bishop of Tocantinópolis, Tocantis, in 1981
- José Belvino do Nascimento, appointed Bishop of Itumbiara, Goias in 1981
- Francisco Barroso Filho, appointed Bishop of Oliveira, Minas Gerais in 1983
- Raymundo Damasceno de Assis, appointed Auxiliary Bishop of Brasilia, Distrito Federal in 1986, future Cardinal
- Joaquim Gioavani Mol Guimarães, appointed Auxiliary Bishop of Belo Horizonte, Minas Gerais in 2006
- José Eudes Campos do Nascimento, appointed Bishop of Leopoldina, Minas Gerais in 2012
- Geovane Luís da Silva, appointed Auxiliary Bishop of Belo Horizonte, Minas Gerais in 2016
- Walter Jorge Pinto, appointed Bishop of União da Vitória, Parana in 2019
- Valter Magno de Carvalho, appointed Auxiliary Bishop of São Salvador da Bahia, Bahia in 2020
- Nivaldo dos Santos Ferreira, appointed Auxiliary Bishop of Belo Horizonte, Minas Gerais in 2020
- Lauro Sérgio Versiani Barbosa, appointed Bishop of Colatina, Espirito Santo in 2021
- Geraldo de Souza Rodrigues, appointed Bishop of Januária, Minas Gerais in 2023
- Danival Milagres Coelho, appointed Auxiliary Bishop of Goiana, Goias in 2024
- Edmar Jose da Silva, appointed Auxiliary Bishop of Belo Horizonte, Minas Gerais in 2024

== Personalities ==
- Antônio Ferreira Viçoso (1787–1875), Bishop of Mariana for 29 years: he was then a loving father to the poor and orphans, protector of slaves, selfless missionary, reformer of the clergy, defender of the rights of the Church, and an exemplary devotee of the Virgin Mary. During his time as Bishop of Mariana, he invited his confreres the Priests of the Congregation of Mission to take the responsibility to form the clergy in the Seminary of Mariana. Bishop Viçoso also invited the Sisters of Charity to open a boarding School for Girls in Mariana.
- Francisco de Paula Victor (12 April 1827 – 23 September 1905) was an Afro-Brazilian Catholic priest. He is known in Brazil as the "Apostle of Charity" for his charitable treatment of the poor. He is the first black Brazilian national to be beatified in the Catholic Church and the first slave-turned-priest to be considered for canonization. He was beatified on 14 November 2015 in Brazil; Cardinal Angelo Amato presided over the Mass on behalf of Pope Francis, who approved his beatification the previous June.
- Isabel Cristina (1962–1982), a young woman who wanted to be a pediatrician to take care of poor children. She was brutally murdered in her apartment for resisting a sexual attacker. She is the first blessed of the Archdiocese.
- Floripes Dornellas de Jesus (1913–1999), a woman who lived for around 60 years reportedly consuming only the Eucharist. (She became known as the "Brazilian Therese Neumann".) Promoter of devotion to the Sacred Heart of Jesus and founder of the male branch of the Apostleship of Prayer.
- Luciano Pedro Mendes de Almeida (1930–2006), Bishop of Mariana from 1988-2006. He exercised, in an edifying way his episcopal ministry from 1988 until his death.

== Suffragan dioceses ==
- Diocese of Caratinga
- Diocese of Governador Valadares
- Diocese of Itabira–Fabriciano

== Sources ==
- Gams, Pius Bonifatius (1873). Series episcoporum Ecclesiae catholicae: quotquot innotuerunt a beato Petro apostolo (in Latin). Ratisbon: Typis et Sumptibus Georgii Josephi Manz.
- Ritzler, Remigius; Sefrin, Pirminus (1958). Hierarchia catholica medii et recentis aevi VI (1730-1799). Patavii: Messagero di S. Antonio.
