= Alphonsus Nwosu =

Nigerian politician and academic

- Born: 17 July 1944 (age 81)
- Citizenship: Nigeria
- Education: B.Sc. University of Nigeria, Nsukka Ph.D. Imperial College of Science and Technology London
- Occupations: Politician, parasitologist, academic, administrator
- Children: 5

Alphonsus Bosah Chukwurah Nwosu (born 17 July 1944), also known as ABC Nwosu, is a Nigerian politician, parasitologist, academic, and administrator who served as minister of health from 2001 to 2003. He also served as commissioner for health in Anambra State from 1986 to 1992.

== Early life and education ==
Nwosu was born in Obiuno Udede, Otolo, Nnewi, Anambra State, Nigeria. He completed his early education at local primary and secondary schools before attending the University of Nigeria, Nsukka (UNN), where he graduated in 1971 with a B.Sc. in zoology. He later earned a Ph.D. in parasitology from Imperial College of Science and Technology, London.

== Academic career ==
Nwosu worked as a lecturer at UNN from 1981 to 1986 and concurrently served as the dean of the Faculty of Science at Anambra State University of Technology, Enugu, from 1981 to 1984. At the age of 37, he became a professor.

== Political and administrative career ==
From 1986 to 1992, during his tenure as commissioner for health in Anambra State, Nwosu spearheaded significant advancements in public health initiatives, infrastructure, and healthcare services. He was a member of the Presidential Advisory Committee on Health and later served as special adviser to President Olusegun Obasanjo on political matters. In February 2001, he was appointed minister of health, where he led efforts to combat infectious diseases and implement healthcare reforms, including the establishment of the National Health Insurance Scheme (NHIS).

== Personal life ==
He is married to Lady Ngozi Nwosu, and they have five children.

== Awards and achievements ==
Nwosu has received several awards, including the Healthcare Leadership Award for his work in healthcare reforms, the Officer of the Order of the Niger (OON) for his services to national development, and the Academic Excellence Award for his contributions to parasitology and science.
