= Alphonsus Longgap Komsol =

Nigerian politician

Alphonsus Longgap Komsol is a Nigerian politician. He was a member of the House of Representatives, representing Shendam/Qua’anpan/Mikang Federal Constituency of Plateau State.

In 2023, there were allegations that he had worked against the interests of his party, the All Progressives Congress, leading to a vote of no-confidence in their youth wing.
