= St. Alphonsus Church =

St. Alphonsus Church may refer to:

- Church of St Alphonse Liguori, Birkirkara, Malta
- Novena Church, Singapore (officially the Church of Saint Alphonsus)

Italy

- Church of St. Alphonsus Liguori, Rome, Italy
- Santa Maria della Mercede e Sant'Alfonso Maria de' Liguori, in the historic center of Naples, Italy

United Kingdom

- Our Lady and St Alphonsus Church, Worcestershire, England

United States

- Saint Alphonsus Church, New Orleans, Louisiana
- National Shrine of St. Alphonsus Liguori, in the Archdiocese of Baltimore, Maryland, United States
- St. Alphonsus Liguori Catholic Church (St. Louis), Missouri
- St. Alphonsus Ligouri Church (New York City)
