= Alphonsus de Guimaraens =

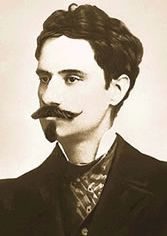
- Born: Afonso Henrique da Costa Guimarães; July 24, 1870; Ouro Preto, Brazil
- Died: July 15, 1921 (aged 50); Mariana, Brazil
- Occupation: Poet
- Writing career
- Movements: Symbolist, Neo-romanticism

Afonso Henrique da Costa Guimarães, known as Alphonsus de Guimaraens; (July 24, 1870 in Ouro Preto – July 15, 1921 in Mariana) was a Brazilian poet.

The poetry of Alphonsus de Guimaraes is substantially mystical and involved with Catholicism. His sonnets display a classical structure, and are profoundly religious. They become increasingly sensitive as he explores the meaning of death, of the impossible love, of solitude and of his inadequacy regarding the world. However, the mystical tone marks in his works a feeling of acceptance and of resignation towards life, suffering and pain. Another characteristic aspect of his work ids the use of spirituality in relation to the feminine figure, which is considered to be an angel, or a celestial being. As a result of that, Guimaraes shows himself not one as a Symbolist but also a follower of Neo-romanticism.

His works, predominantly poetic, made him one of the main Symbolist authors in Brazil. In reference to the city he spent most of his life in, he is also called the "loner of Mariana", his "ivory tower of Symbolism" ("o solitário de Mariana" and "torre de marfim do Simbolismo", respectively, in Portuguese).

== Biography ==
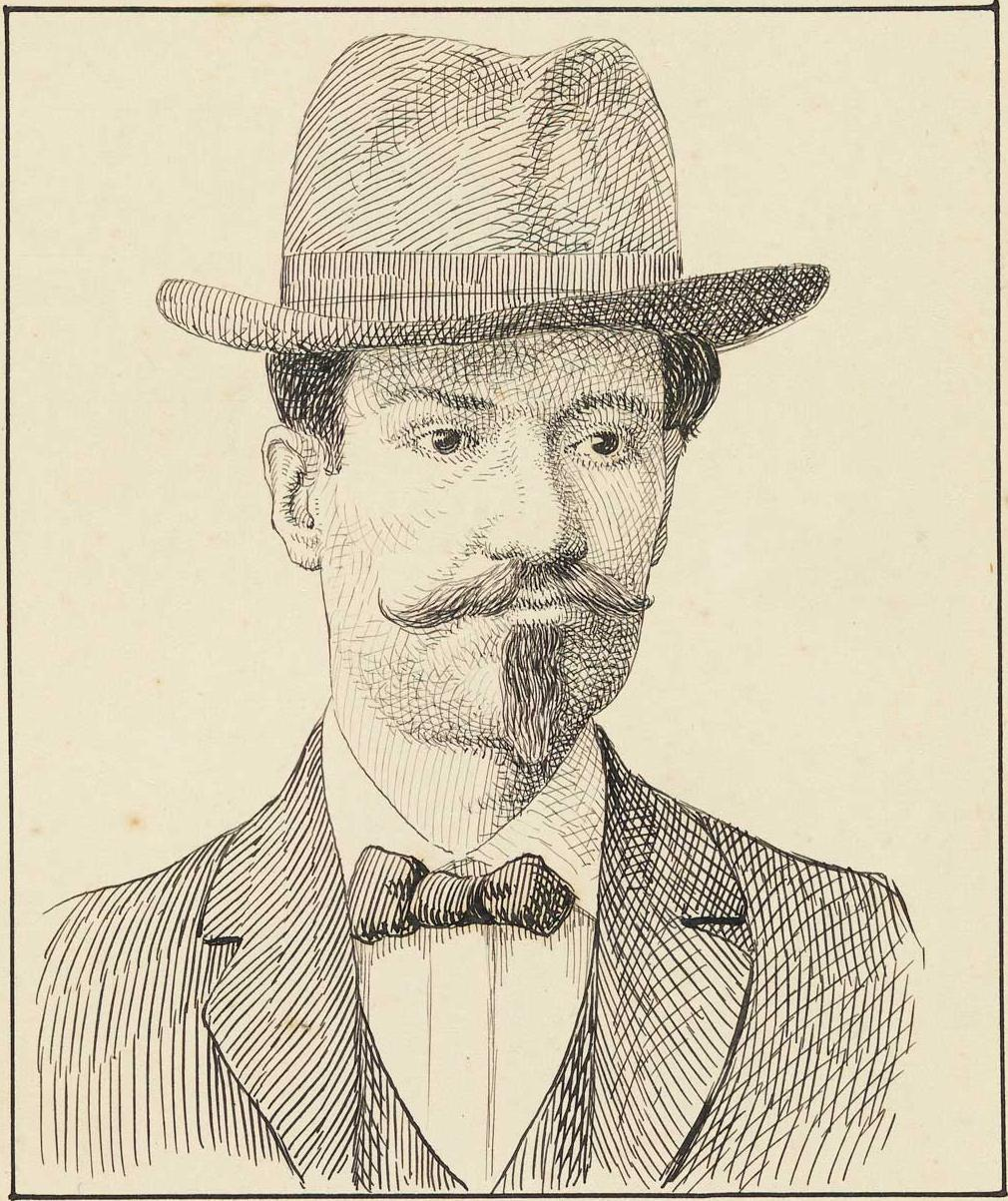
Alphonsus Guimarães.

Afonso Henriques da Costa Guimarães was born on July 24, 1870, in the city of Ouro Preto in Minas Gerais. He was son of a Portuguese trader, Albino da Costa Guimarães and Francisca de Paula Guimarães Alvim, niece of the Romantic writer Bernardo Guimarães. He enrolled in 1887 in the engineering course of his city. During his early life he suffered the premature loss of his cousin and fiancée, Constança, a fact that deeply affected him emotionally and physically.

Sick, he moved to São Paulo in 1891 to study Law in the University Largo do Francisco. There he collaborated with the local newspapers Diário Mercantil, Comércio de São Paulo, Correio Paulistano, O Estado de S. Paulo and A Gazeta and attended Vila Kyrial, where the young Symbolists gathered. After three years, he returned to Ouro Preto, graduating in Law in 1894. In 1895, in the city Rio de Janeiro, Guimaraes met Cruz e Sousa, a poet whom he already admired, and became a close friend of him. In 1897, he marries Zenaide de Oliveira.

In the year of 1899, he premiered in literature with two volumes of verses: Septenário das Dores de Nossa Senhora e Câmara Ardente and Dona Mística; both showing clear Symbolistic influences. In 1902 he published Kiriale, under the pseudonym of Alphonsus de Guimaraens; this opened opportunities in the literary world, giving him recognition, however restricted. He had been working as substitute judge in Conceição do Serro, but in 1903 he lost his position, which led him to grave financial difficulties.

After refusing a prominent position in the newspaper A Gazeta, Alphonsus de Guimaraens was appointed to direct the political newspaper of Conceição do Serro, where he would collaborate with his brother Archangelus de Guimaraens, Cruz e Souza and José Severino de Resende. In 1906, he became judge of Mariana, a job he would exercise for the rest of his life.

He lived his last years with his wife Zenaide de Oliveira, with whom he had 14 children, including Alphonsus de Guimaraens Filho, who, following the steps of his father, would later become a poet. He was occasionally visited by a few friends and admirers, until his death on July 15, 1921, in Mariana.

== Works ==
- Septenário das Dores de Nossa Senhora e Câmara Ardente (1899)
- Dona Mística (1899)
- Kiriale (1902)
- Pauvre Lyre

=== Posthumous ===
- Pastoral aos crentes do amor e da morte (1923)
- Escada de Jacó
- Pulvis
- Salmos da noite
- Poesias (1938).
- Jesus eu sei que ela morreu, Viceja...
- Teste
