= Mariana, Minas Gerais =

Oldest city in Minas Gerais, Brazil

Mariana
- Municipality
- Municipality of Mariana
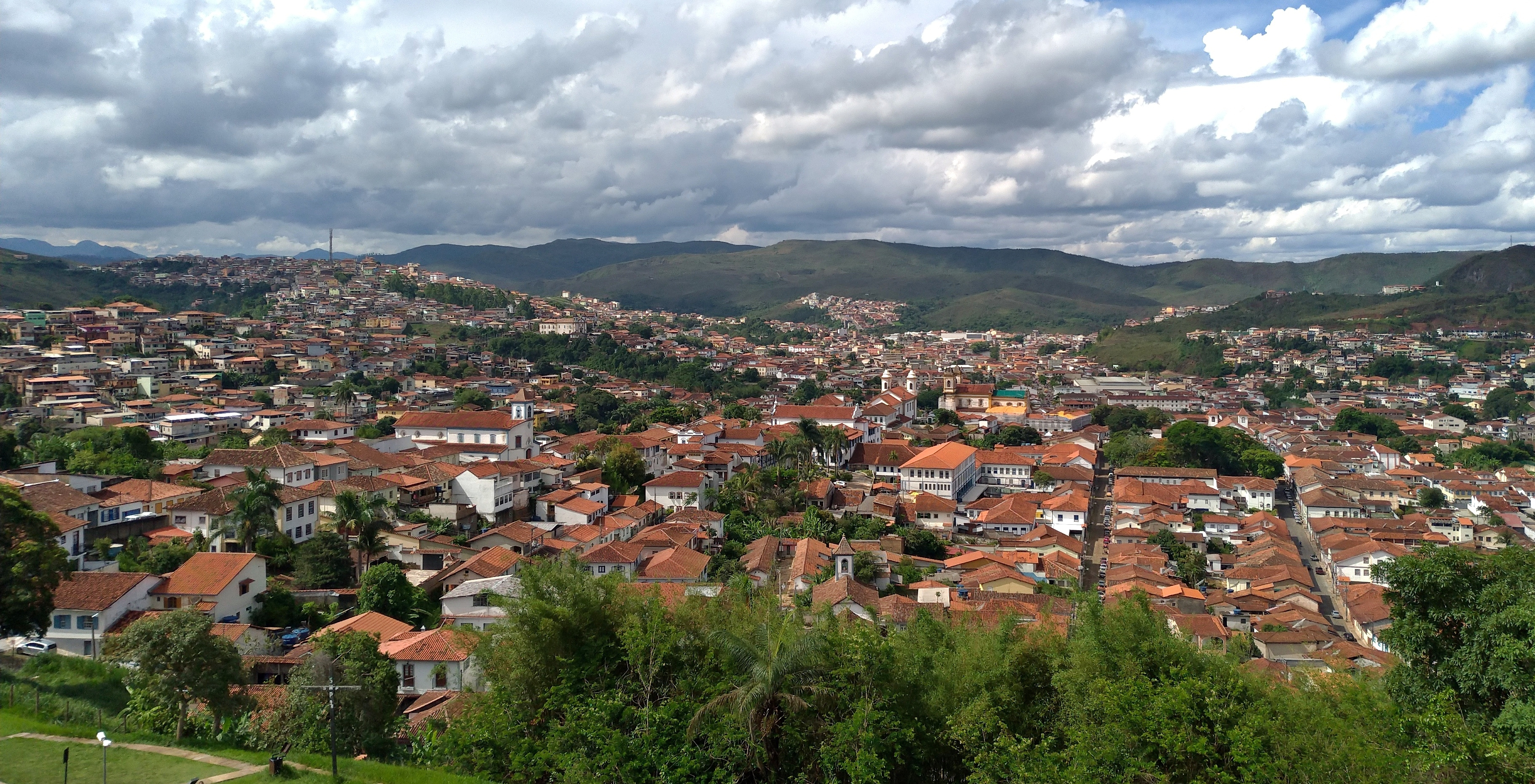
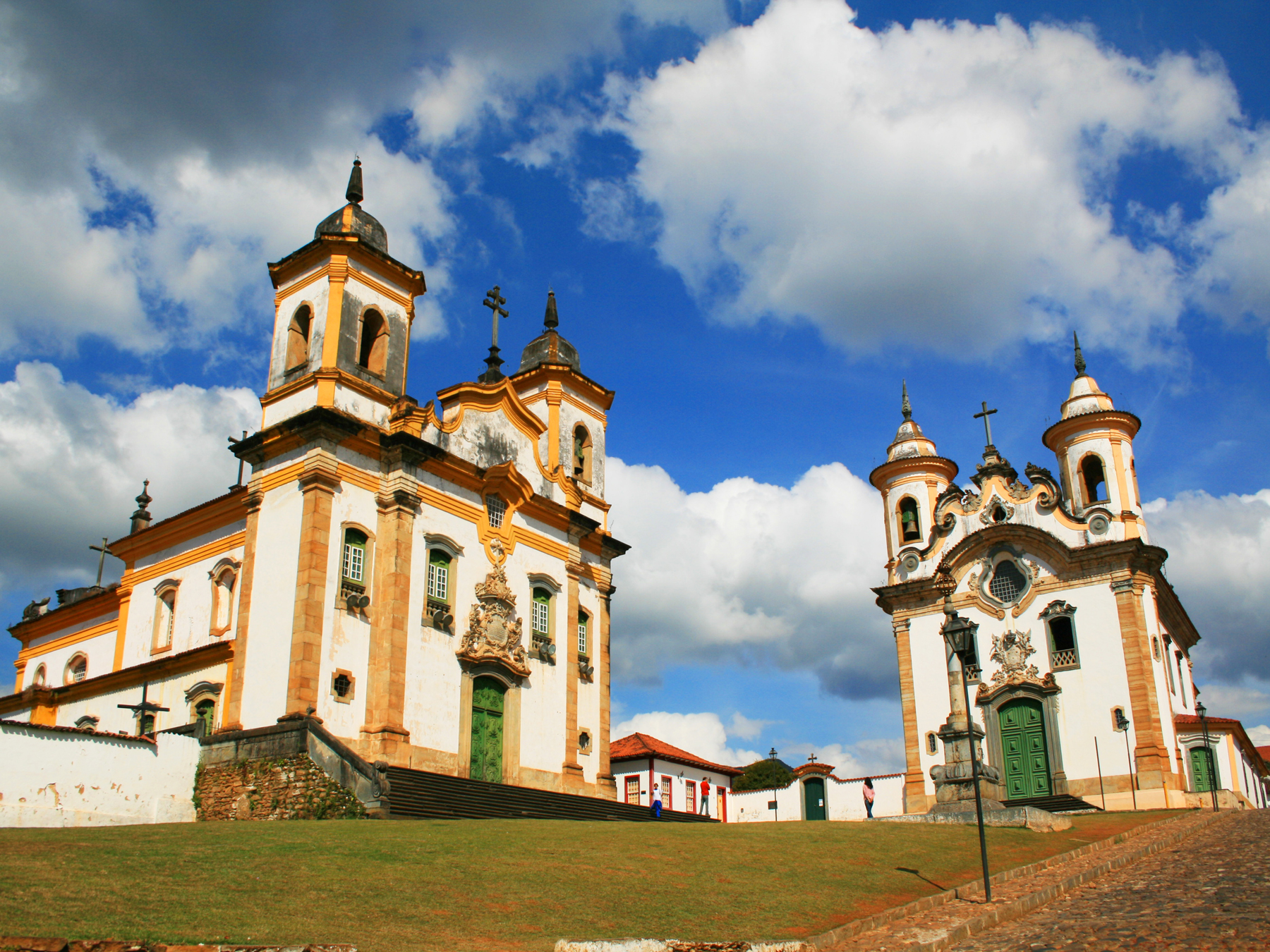
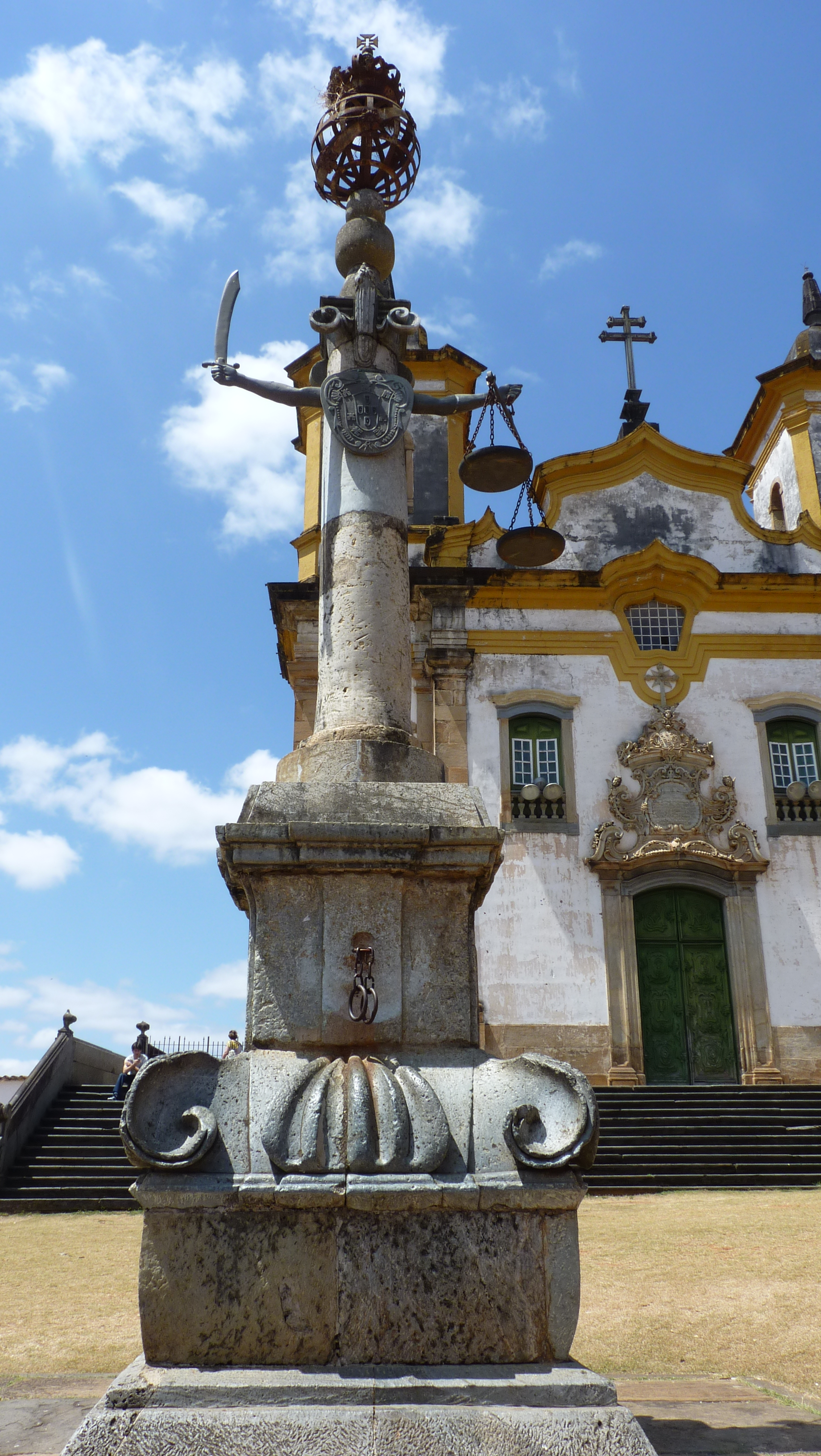
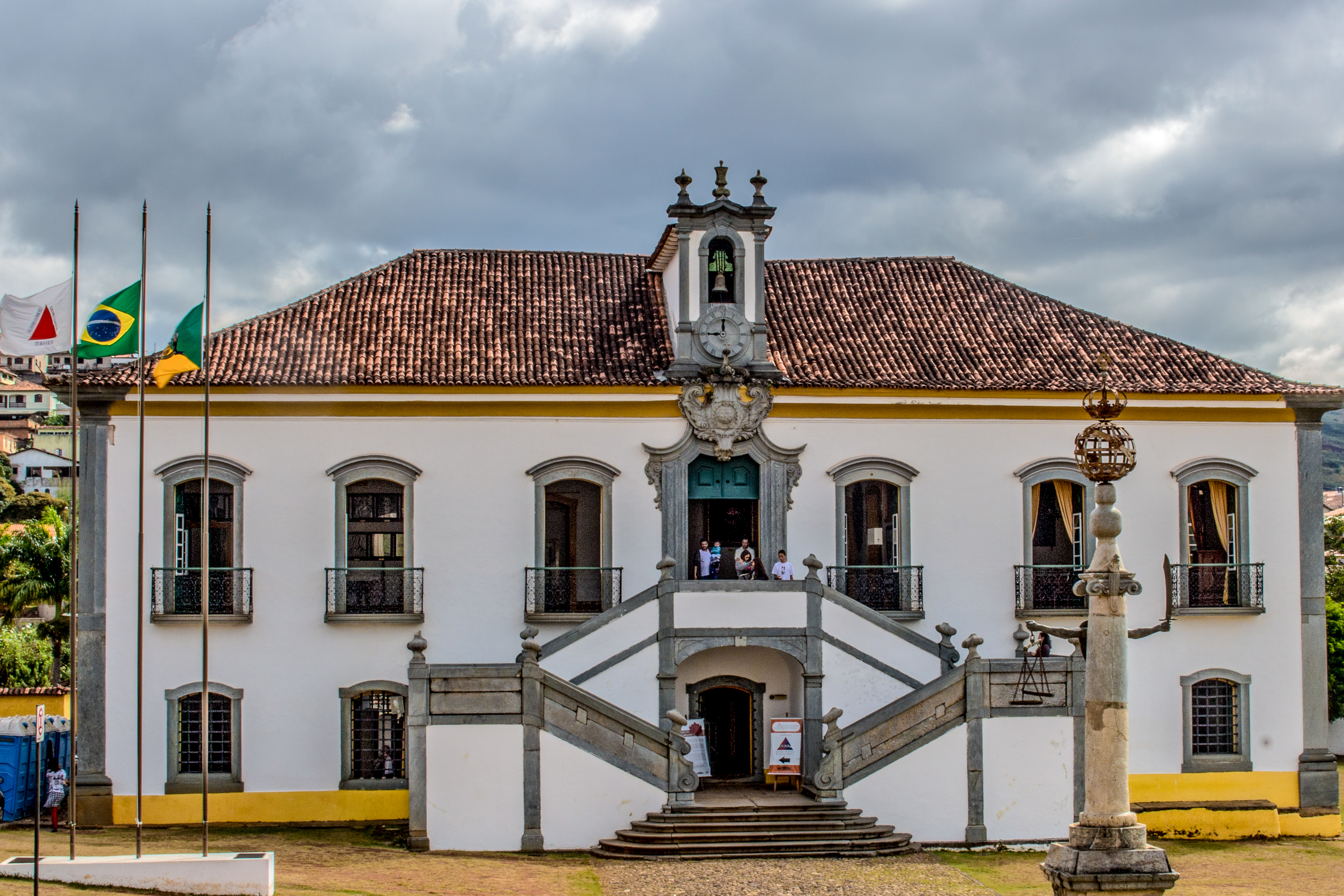
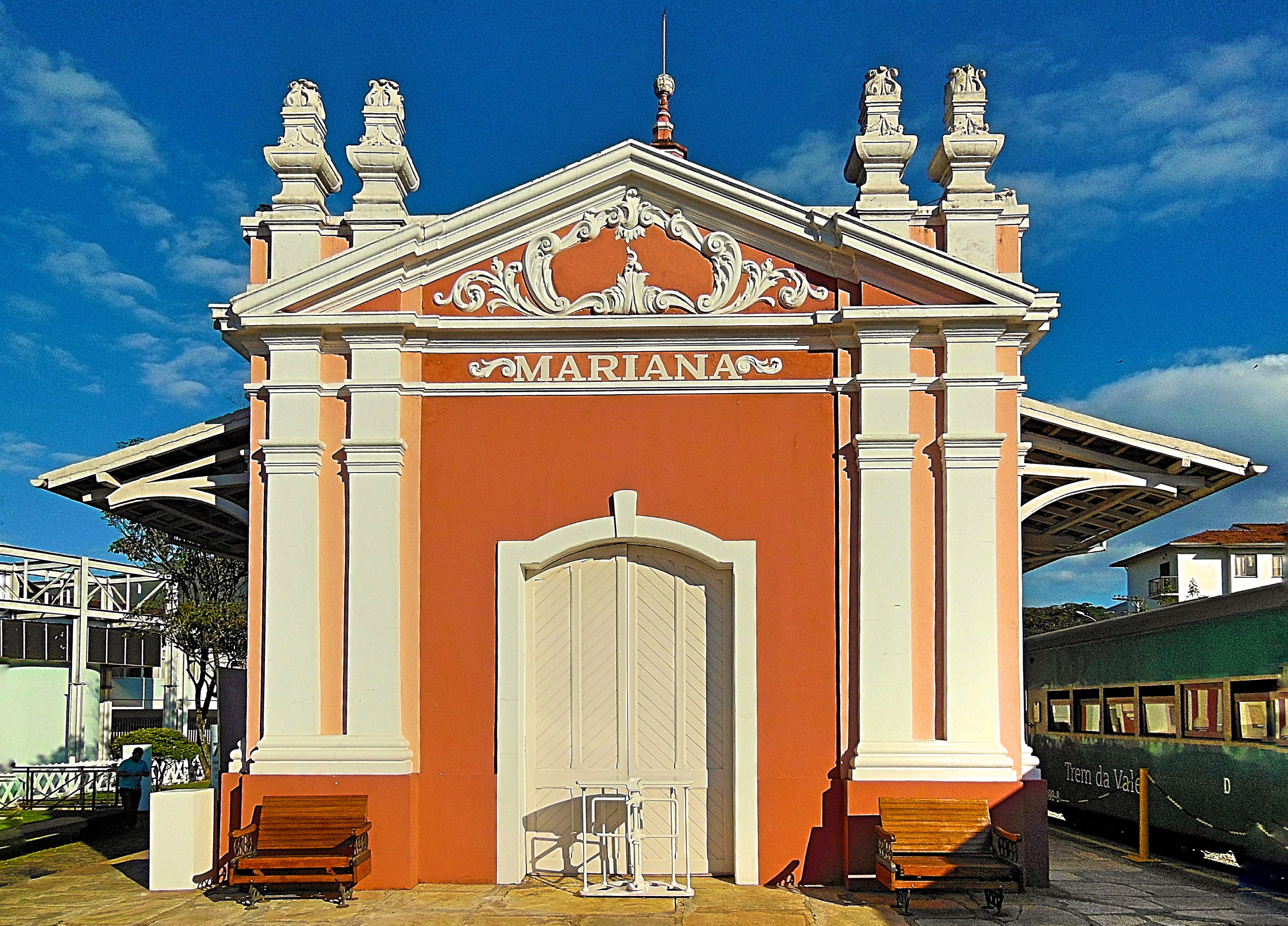

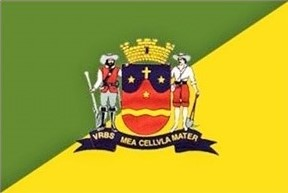
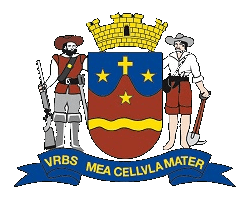
- Flag Coat of arms
- Anthem: Hino de Mariana
- Location in Minas Gerais
- Coordinates: 20°22′42″S 43°23′59″W
- Country: Brazil
- Region: Southeast
- State: Minas Gerais
- Founded: July 16, 1696
- Incorporated (city): April 23, 1745
- Named for: Maria Anna of Austria

Government
  - Mayor: Juliano Vasconcelos Gonçalves (PSB)

Area
  - Municipality: 1,194.208 km^{2} (461.086 sq mi)
  - Urban: 11.77 km^{2} (4.54 sq mi)
  - Rank: Local Centre (5)
- Elevation: 697 m (2,287 ft)
- Highest elevation (Pico do Itacolomi): 1,772 m (5,814 ft)

Population (2022)
  - Municipality: 61,387
  - Density: 5,140/km^{2} (13,300/sq mi)
- Demonym: marianense
- Time zone: UTC−3 (BRT)
- CEP (postal code): 35420-000
- Area code: 31
- HDI (2010): 0.742 – high
- Website: www.mariana.mg.gov.br

Mariana (Portuguese: [maɾiˈɐ̃nə]) is a municipality in the Southeastern state of Minas Gerais, Brazil. As of 2022, the city had a population of 61,387, estimated to be at around 64,058 in 2024, making it the 59th most populous city in its state. Known for its characteristic colonial-style architecture, Mariana is the oldest settlement in Minas Gerais, as well as the first to be officially ordained with the status of "city", in the mid-18th century.

Situated along the lower contours of a river valley and surrounded by many rocky escarpments, Mariana has both historical and contemporary ties to the mining industry, having been founded on the very same spot where gold was first spotted by Portuguese explorers in the late 17th century. Although mining is largely responsible for the historical economic development of the region, the city of Mariana has also been at the centre of an unprecedented disaster brought about by the mining industry, with the 2015 Samarco levee rupture and floods.

Due to its cultural legacy and the active conservation of its many historical sites, Mariana is a popular tourist destination, making tourism another important component of the local economy. As such, the city is part of the Caminho dos Diamantes (Portuguese for 'Diamonds Path') section of the Estrada Real, the largest tourist route in Brazil, (Note: For more information, see https://institutoestradareal.com.br/en/estrada-real) featuring dozens of other historically significant destinations – such as the town of Ouro Preto, only 18 kilometres (11 mi) west of Mariana.

== History ==
=== Pre-colonial period ===
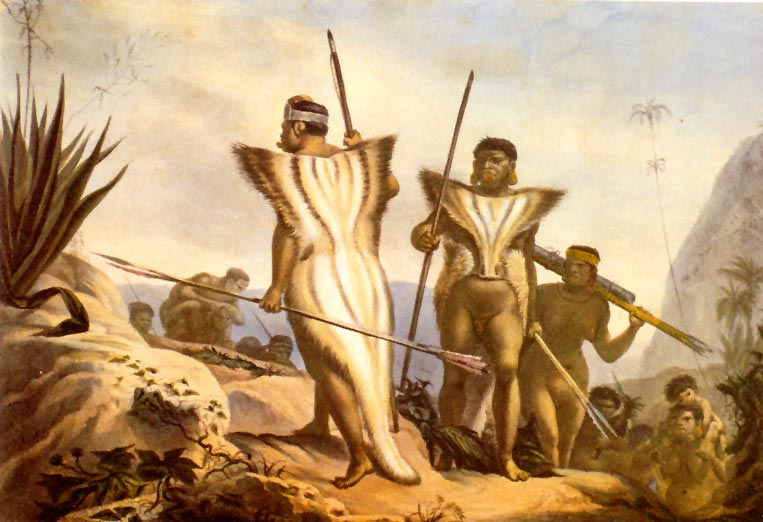
Jean-Baptiste Debret, 1834.

Although the official historiography around the city is primarily focused on the Portuguese colonial efforts that formally originated it, many contemporary researchers have been dedicating their efforts into further investigating and revealing the pre-colonial history of the native peoples that inhabited the area before European contact, a still poorly understood topic.

However, ethnic studies have shown that the indigenous population that contemporarily inhabits some of the regions around Mariana, known as the Krenak (also known as Aimoré), originally came from the coastal regions of southern Bahia, being part of a larger family-group the Portuguese called Botocudos (lit. 'Labret Wearers') and which were gradually relocated – through coercion, displacement and extermination – to the valleys of the Doce River Basin, up until the early 20th century.

=== Colonial period ===
The modern city of Mariana was born out of the Bandeiras period of Brazil's colonial history: during the second half of the 17th century and up until the late 18th, many members of the colonial aristocracy either financed or personally commanded expeditions into the interior of the colony, with the intent of exploring the regions still unknown to the Portuguese Crown and in hopes of finding new untapped riches such as gold and silver.

Around the 16th of July, 1696, a group of bandeirantes (Note: Portuguese: [bɐ̃deɪ̯ˈɾɐ̃tɪs]) led by explorers Salvador Fernandes Furtado de Mendonça and Miguel Garcia da Cunha, camped on the banks of a brooklet, which they named Ribeirão do Carmo (lit. 'Carmel Brook'), after Our Lady of Mount Carmel. While resting, the Portuguese explorers found that the unremarkable stream of water sported rich auriferous alluviums and promptly decided to establish a permanent camp in the area, giving rise to a small settlement that came to be homonymously known by the stream's name.

Attracting more and more settlers and gold prospectors, by 1711 the settlement came to be known as Vila Albuquerque (lit.. 'Albuquerque Town') through a royal decree that established the São Paulo and Gold Mines Captaincy, splitting the administrative region in and around Mariana from the São Vicente Captaincy (today, the state of Rio de Janeiro) and nominated Antônio Albuquerque Coelho de Carvalho as its first governor-general (giving the town its new namesake). Through this, Vila Albuquerque became the de facto capital of the captaincy, and although the administrative headquarters of the colony were still located in the much older town of São Paulo of Piratininga, Antônio Albuquerque – as well as both of his successors – decided to take up residence in the emerging township, mainly due to the Portuguese Crown's riveting interest in the area's burgeoning gold-mining capacities. Only a year later, on April 14, 1712, when news of the town's incorporation into the colonial administration reached the metropole, the town's establishment was officially ratified and it was registered under its originating namesake brook: Vila de Nossa Senhora do Ribeirão do Carmo (lit. 'Town of Our Lady of Carmel Brook'), or simply, Vila do Carmo.

In 1720, a major rebellion broke out in the neighbouring municipality of Vila Rica (today, Ouro Preto), mainly sparked by the local elite's growing dissent of the colonial administration's taxation of gold production – one of many similarly motivated rebellions the region saw throughout the 18th century. After violently quelling the rebellion by employing his personal dragoon brigade, the Third Count of Assumar, the region's then governor-general, under the guise of the Crown, established the new Captaincy of Minas Gerais, severing administrative ties with São Paulo and, in order to closely surveil the region's rebellious tendencies, moving the colonial capital from Vila do Carmo to Vila Rica (lit. 'Wealthy Town').

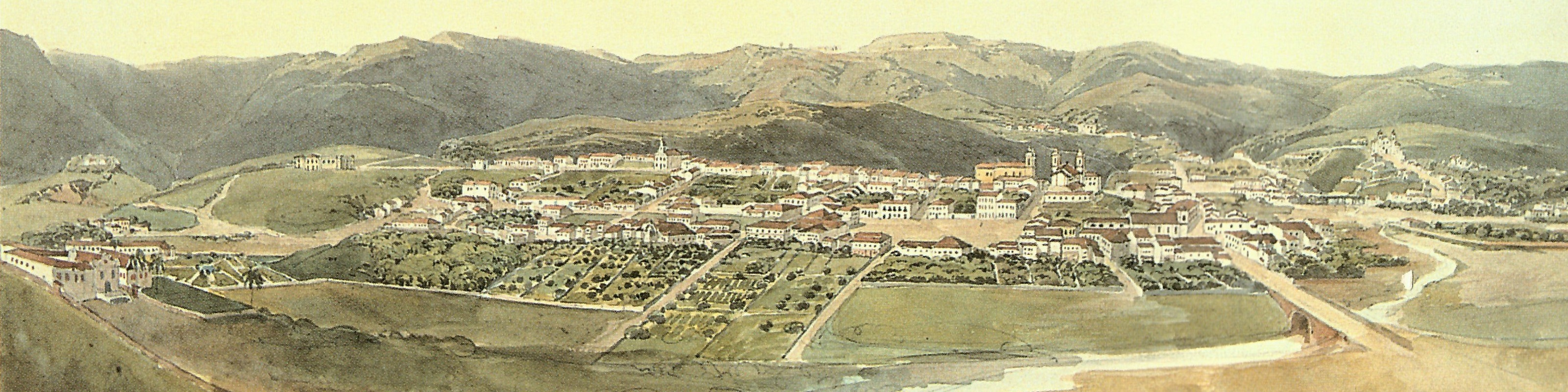
Birds-eye depiction of Mariana, with the Carmo Creek at the foreground, around the early 19th century, by Austrian painter Thomas Ender

=== Slavery and the gold rush ===
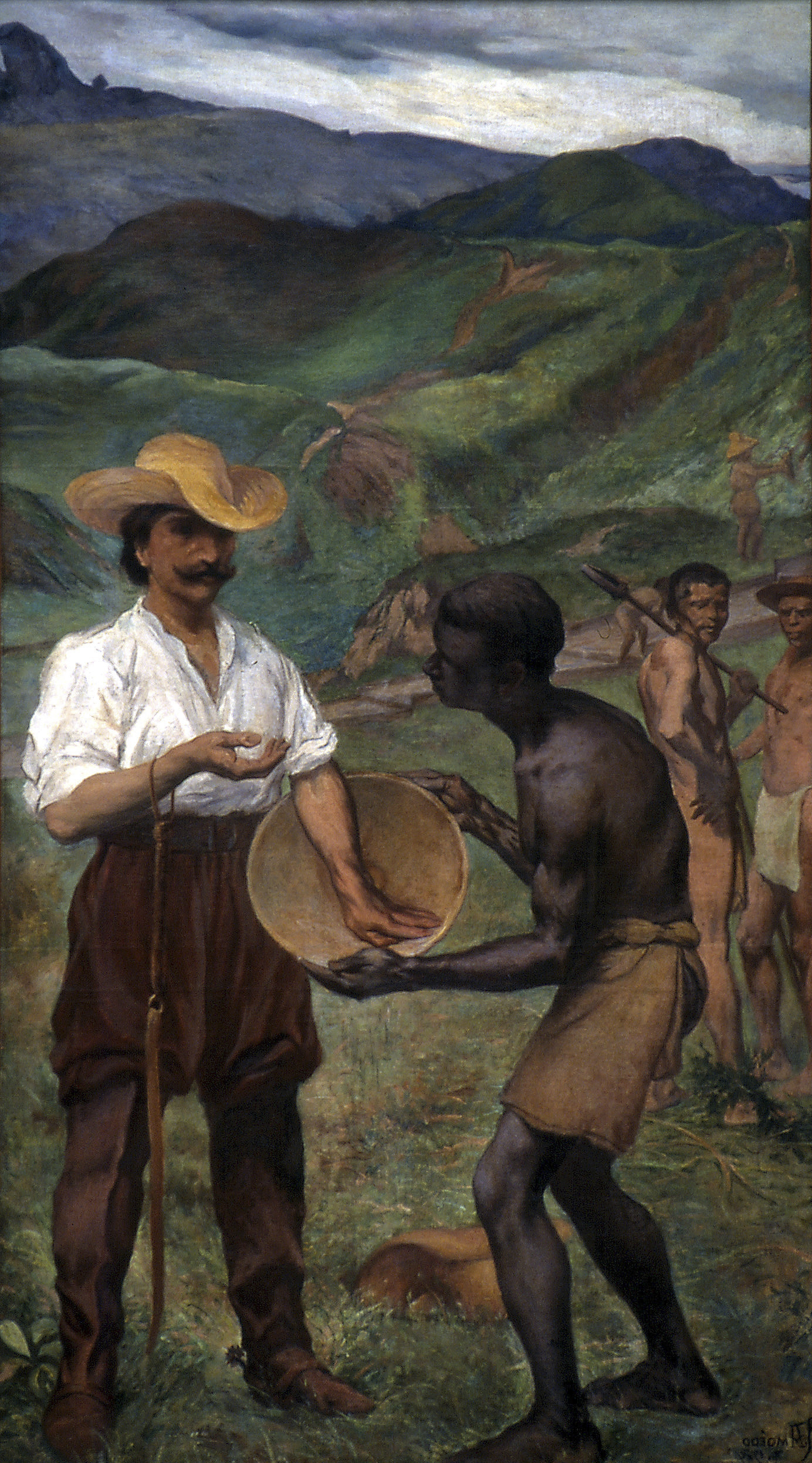
O ciclo do ouro (lit. 'The gold cycle'), 1923 painting by Rodolfo Amoedo.

All throughout the 18th century and especially so during its first half, gold prospecting, panning and mining came to be the Mariana's primary economic activity, giving rise to an affluent local elite and further strengthening the exploitation of slave labour in the region.

According to historical demographic research, by the mid-18th century, Mariana was one of the most prominent destinations in the slave trade throughout all of the Americas, undergoing a rapid growth of its enslaved population in a short period of time: in 1716, the town had a population of 6,834 slaves; by 1718, that number jumped to 10,937, and by 1723, it became 15,828 – more than 1,200 additional slaves per year. The enslaved labour force of the town would peak in 1735, at more than 26,000 people, or roughly a third of all of the captaincy's slaves, mostly employed in gold-mining. For such, the town's gold output was estimated at half a metric ton (around 2.5 million carats) per year, starting in 1720.

Under such economic incentives, the region soon began to transform into one of the New World's most diverse societies in terms of coinhabiting African ethnicities, estimated to be, up until 1723, at around 40 different ethnic groups. Consequently, the town's cultural legacy has been greatly influenced by black culture: the region encompassing Mariana and its neighbouring towns is second only to Salvador, Bahia, in harbouring Brazil's largest percentage of black people, most of which directly descend from either freed, indentured or, most notably, escaped slaves, who founded small, secluded settlements around the region known as quilombos, (Note: Portuguese: [kiˈlõbʊ]) where runaway slaves and other oppressed peoples could establish new lives in liberty. Additionally, Mariana's racial legacy is also illustrated in its current population, with around 73% of its people identifying as either 'black' or 'pardo' (Portuguese for 'mixed-race').

=== The city of Mariana and the Catholic Church ===
Alongside the Portuguese colonial efforts in the region, there was the ever-present authority of the Vatican; running hand-in-hand with state power, the Church and its symbols were a decisive assertion of dominium and consecration for Portuguese settlers. Since Mariana's founding, in 1696, one the first buildings to ever be erected was precisely that of a Christian place of worship: the small chapel of Our Lady of Assumption, built by the founding expedition's priest, and which, in 1701, was officially made into a Catholic parish by the bishop of Rio de Janeiro.

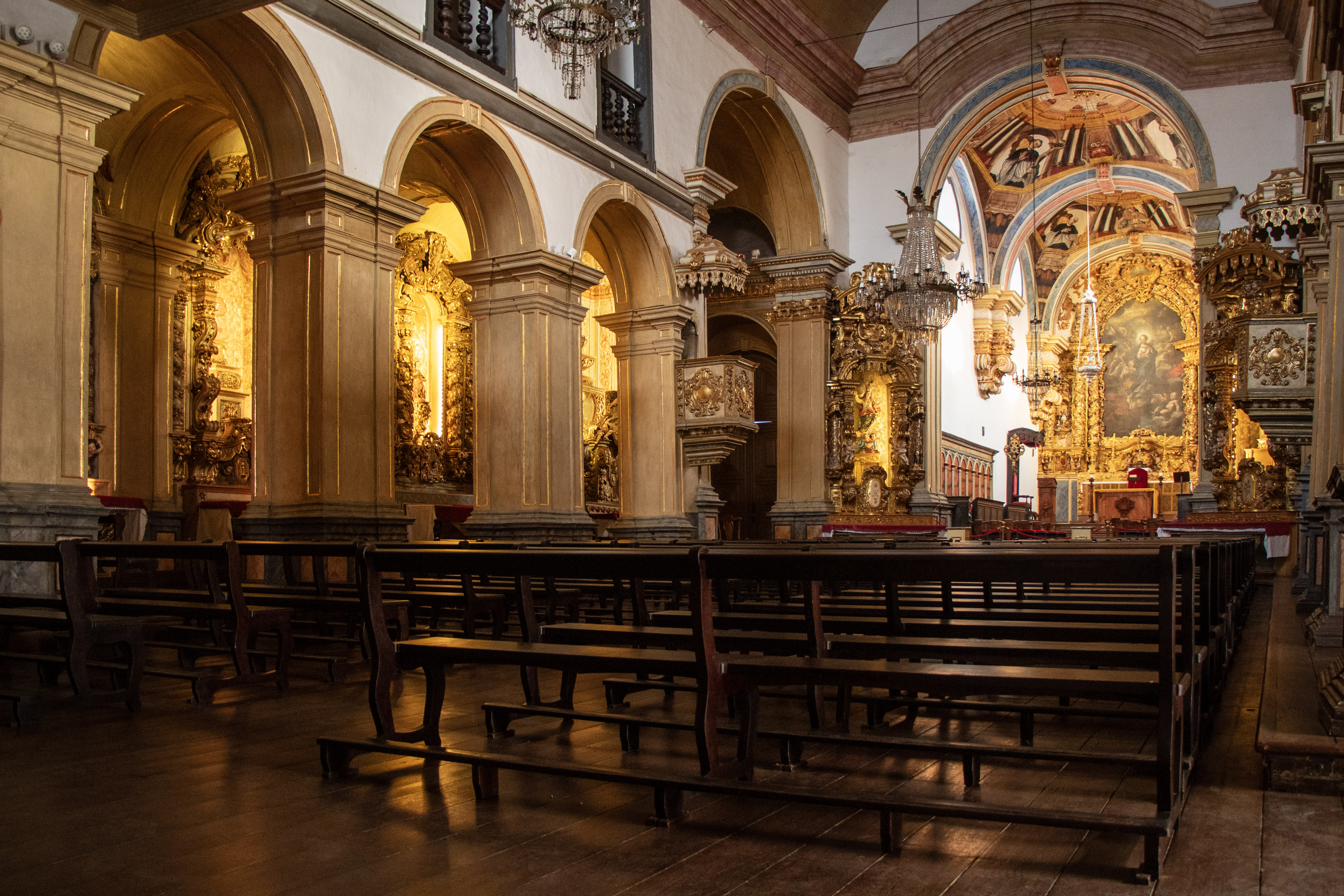
Interior view of Mariana's mother church, locally known as Igreja da Sé.

Having grown both in population and economic prestige by the middle of the 18th century, the town underwent several major urbanistic changes, with much of its civil infrastructure being built around the founding chapel, itself becoming the town's matrice, in 1712. Three decades later, in 1745 – the pinnacle of gold extraction in the region – the town was elevated to the status of city by King John V, who assigned José Fernandes Alpoim as the lead-engineer responsible for designing and erecting a new urban plan for the city. By the same royal decree, the town was officially renamed Mariana (at the time, spelled 'Marianna'), in honour of Portugal's queen at the time, Maria Anna of Austria.

In the same year (though only taking effect in 1748) the Holy See reorganized the local ecclesiastical subdivision into the Diocese of Mariana, making it, at the time, the sixth bishopric in Colonial Brazil (Bahia, 1551; Rio de Janeiro, 1676; Olinda 1676; Maranhão, 1677; Belém do Pará, 1720). For such, Pope Benedict XIV assigned Mons. Manuel da Cruz as the diocese's first bishop, conferred with the religious stewardship of around forty local parishes, whilst headed by the Basilica of Our Lady of Assumption. In 1906, Pope Pius X elevated its ecclesiastical status once again, to that of the Archdiocese of Mariana, which it still holds to this day.

=== Recent history ===
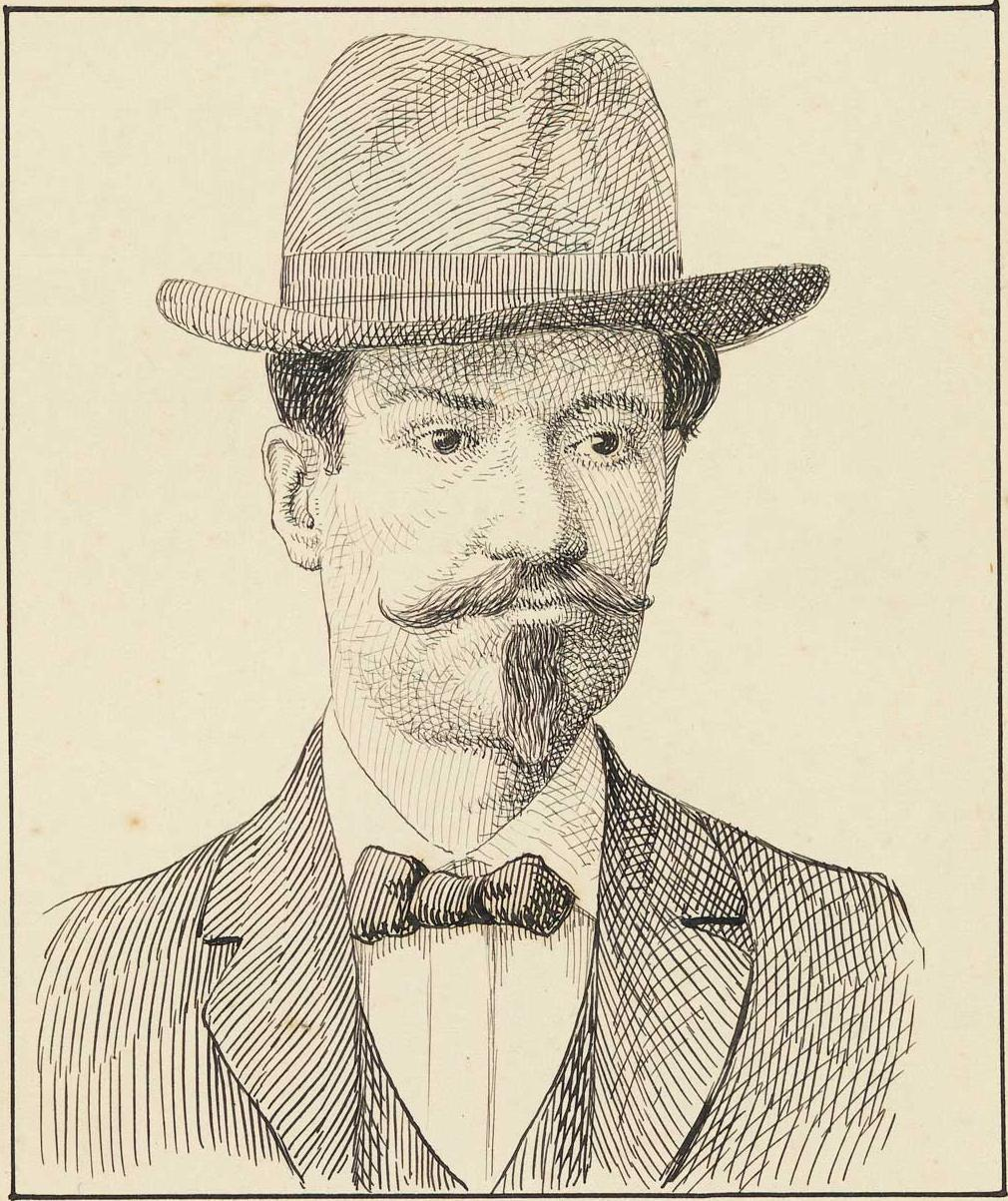
Late 19th century quill drawing of Alphonsus de Guimaraens, by Laudelino Freire.

By late 19th century, long after the independence of Brazil, Mariana and its surrounding region slowly began to lose its prominence amongst the urban centres of Minas Gerais; not only had the gold mines long been exhausted, no longer providing any substantial economic gains, but also, with the founding of the new state capital of Belo Horizonte in 1897 (a title previously held by Mariana's neighbouring city of Ouro Preto), the city would no longer be viewed as a major economic centre.

Nonetheless, the city still managed to claim a few instances of historical notoriety: in 1906, a newly appointed municipal judge would set up residence in Mariana with his family, one that would later be widely known throughout much of the Lusophony as the famous symbolistic poet Alphonsus de Guimaraens. In 1987, the city would inaugurate the Casa Alphonsus de Guimaraens Museum, situated in the poet's former home, dedicated to his life and poetic oeuvre.

In 1945, Brazil's president Getúlio Vargas would grant Mariana the title of National Monument, for its significant role in the formation of the national identity of the Brazilian nation, both through its cultural, religious, and historical heritage and its active civic participation in the national sphere.

Another relevant historical attribution the city would be remembered by can be found in its direct connection to the history of the Brazilian Central Railway: by 1955, one could board a train in Mariana's main train station and travel to one of seven locally serviced destinations: Alvinópolis, Barra Longa, Guaraciaba, Ouro Preto, Santa Bárbara, Belo Horizonte and Rio de Janeiro.

=== 2015 Catastrophe ===
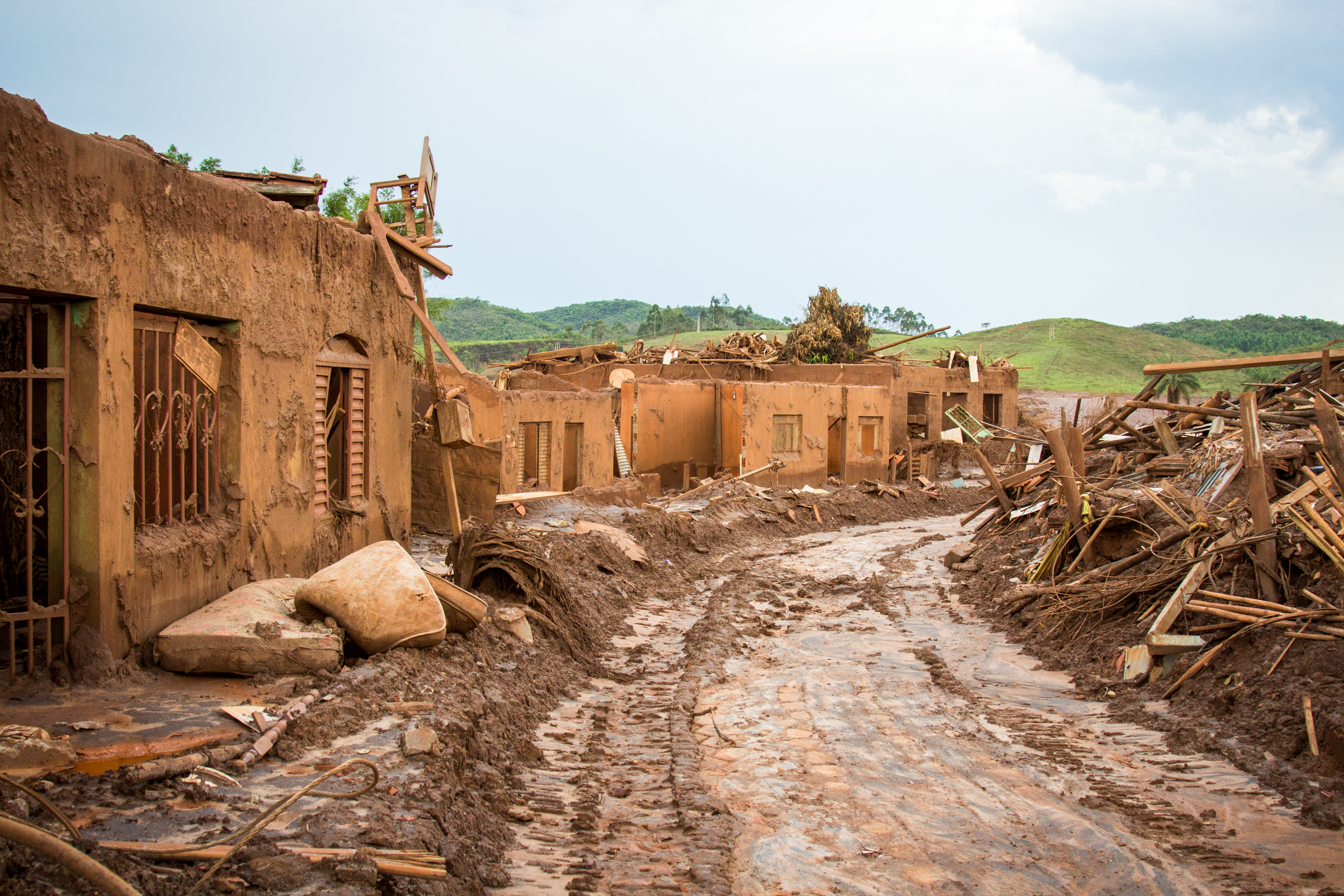
A street in Bento Rodrigues, a municipal district of Mariana, after the catastrophe.

Mariana would rise to national notoriety once again in 2015, though, unfortunately, for disastrous reasons. On November 5, just 35 kilometres (22 mi) from Mariana's city centre, a local tailings dam owned and maintained by the Samarco mining corporation gave way after a major structural failure of the levee, unleashing an insurmountable slew of mud and mining refuse throughout most of the Doce River Basin, eventually reaching the Atlantic Ocean.

Although direct fatalities were restricted to under 20 people, a major displacement crisis ensued: two of Mariana's municipal districts were all but entirely destroyed, with many others being severely damaged by the flooding and mudslides. If taken by the estimated total volume of unleashed tailings, as of 2015, Mariana's dam break was the largest chemical contamination incident in recorded history, more than twice as impactful as the Mount Polley tailings pond breach.

After a period of time spent building up the case, a legal task-force composed of the Public Prosecutor's Offices for the states of Minas Gerais, Espírito Santo and the Federal Union, set forth an indictment against Samarco, Vale S.A. and BHP Billiton, for the crimes of "qualified murder, pollution, inundation, and crimes against fauna, flora, urban order, and the cultural heritage". As of November 2024, federal judge Patricia de Carvalho has acquitted all indicted individuals of these charges.

== See also ==
- List of municipalities in Minas Gerais
- Ouro Preto
- Minas Gerais

== Bibliography ==
Martins, Vittor P. (2023-08-14). Os batuques do silêncio: patrimônio e educação quilombola no município de Mariana (Minas Gerais); uma análise transecular [Drums of silence: Quilombola education and heritage in the municipality of Mariana, MG; a transsecular analysis] (Thesis thesis) (in Portuguese). Federal University of Ouro Preto. pp. 23–32.

Frejat, Adolpho, ed. (1959). "Mariana". Enciclopédia dos Municípios Brasileiros [Encyclopaedia of Brazilian Municipalities] (PDF) (in Portuguese). Vol. XXVI. Rio de Janeiro: Brazilian Institute of Geography and Statistics (published 1959-05-29). pp. 49–57.

Fonseca, Cláudia D. (1998). "O Espaço Urbano de Mariana: sua formação e suas representações" [The Urban Space of Mariana: formation and representations] (PDF). Termo de Mariana – História e Documentação (in Portuguese). Editora UFOP. pp. 27–66. ISBN 85-288-0024-5.
