= Cathedral Basilica of Our Lady of Assumption, Mariana =

Roman Catholic cathedral in Mariana, Brazil

Cathedral Basilica of Our Lady of the Assumption
- Catedral Metropolitana Basílica Nossa Senhora da Assunção
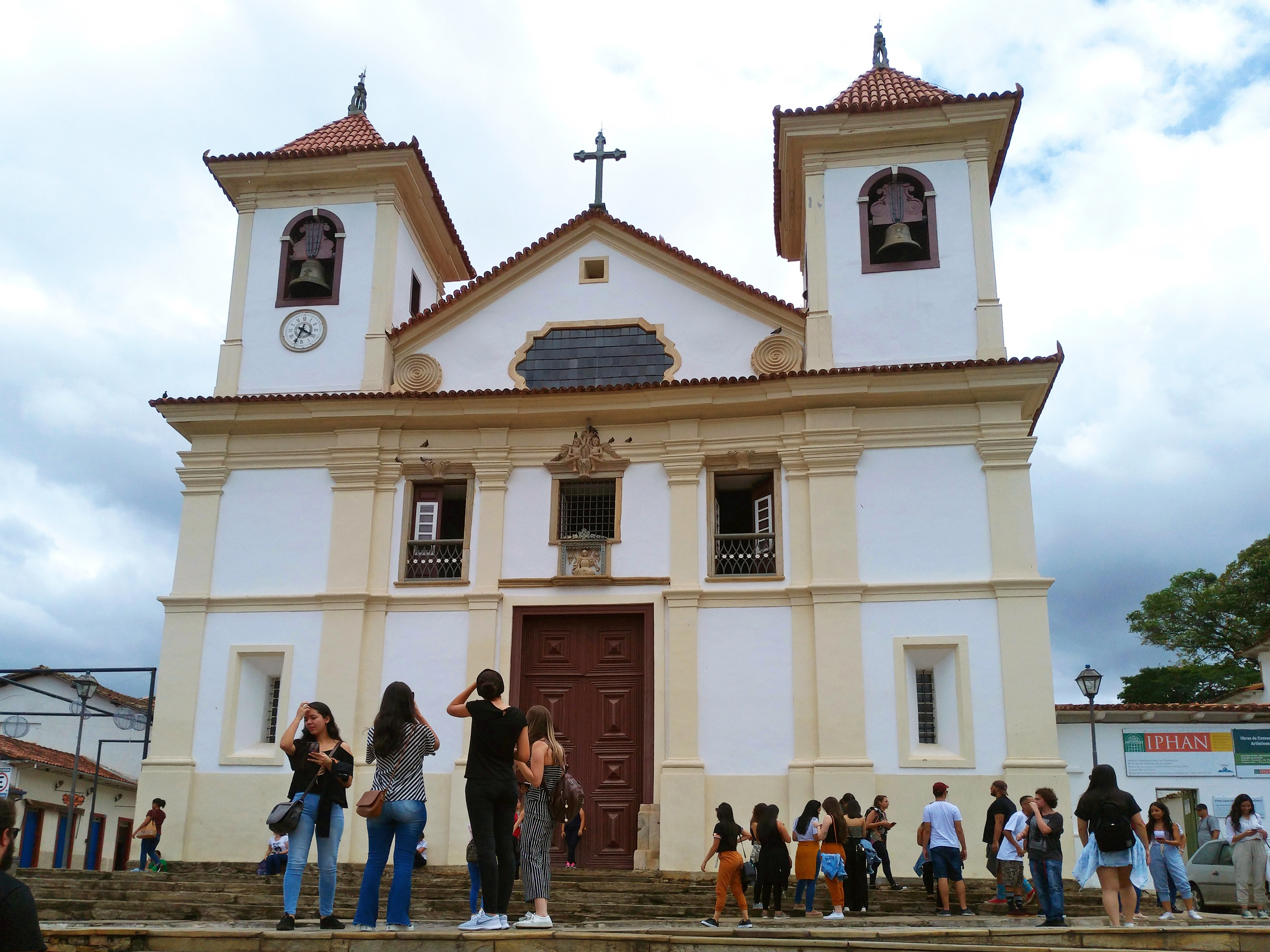
- Façade of the cathedral
- Cathedral Basilica of Our Lady of the Assumption
- 20°22′41″S 43°24′59″W
- Location: Mariana, Minas Gerais
- Country: Brazil
- Denomination: Catholic Church

History
- Status: Cathedral and minor basilica
- Dedication: Our Lady of the Assumption

Architecture
- Functional status: Active
- Heritage designation: IPHAN
- Designated: 8 September 1939
- Style: Portuguese colonial, Baroque and Rococo

Administration
- Archdiocese: Mariana

The Cathedral Basilica of Our Lady of the Assumption (Portuguese: Catedral Basílica Nossa Senhora da Assunção), often called the Mariana Cathedral or the Sé of Mariana (Portuguese: Catedral da Sé de Mariana), is a Catholic cathedral in Mariana, Minas Gerais, Brazil. It is the seat of the Archdiocese of Mariana. The church became the cathedral of the newly created Diocese of Mariana in 1745 and has held the title of minor basilica since 1963.

The present building grew from an early eighteenth-century parish church. Its plain twin-towered exterior encloses carved and gilded retables from successive phases of the Brazilian Baroque, a painted chancel ceiling, choir stalls, and an eighteenth-century pipe organ. The Instituto do Patrimônio Histórico e Artístico Nacional (IPHAN) listed the cathedral and its contents in 1939. It reopened in December 2022 after nearly seven years of conservation work.

== History ==
=== Parish church ===
The mining settlement of Ribeirão do Carmo had a small chapel dedicated to Our Lady of Mount Carmel when the parish was formed in 1704. The Portuguese miner António Pereira Machado had built a second chapel, dedicated to Our Lady of the Immaculate Conception, in 1703. When Ribeirão do Carmo became a vila in 1711, the latter chapel was chosen as the mother church.

Plans for a larger church were under way by 1714. Jacinto Barbosa Lopes directed the building campaign, which incorporated the earlier chapel as a sacristy. The nave and chancel were largely finished between 1716 and 1718 in timber and earth construction. Five retables were in place by 1724, and José Martins and Manuel de Sousa e Silva completed the carving and gilding of the main altar in 1727.

The structure soon needed repair. António Coelho Fonseca rebuilt the front and raised the towers from 1734. José Coelho de Noronha worked on the side retables between 1744 and 1751. Their carving belongs to different stages of Portuguese Baroque design, from the twisted columns and concentric archivolts of the National Portuguese style to the more sculptural forms used under John V of Portugal.

=== Cathedral and basilica ===
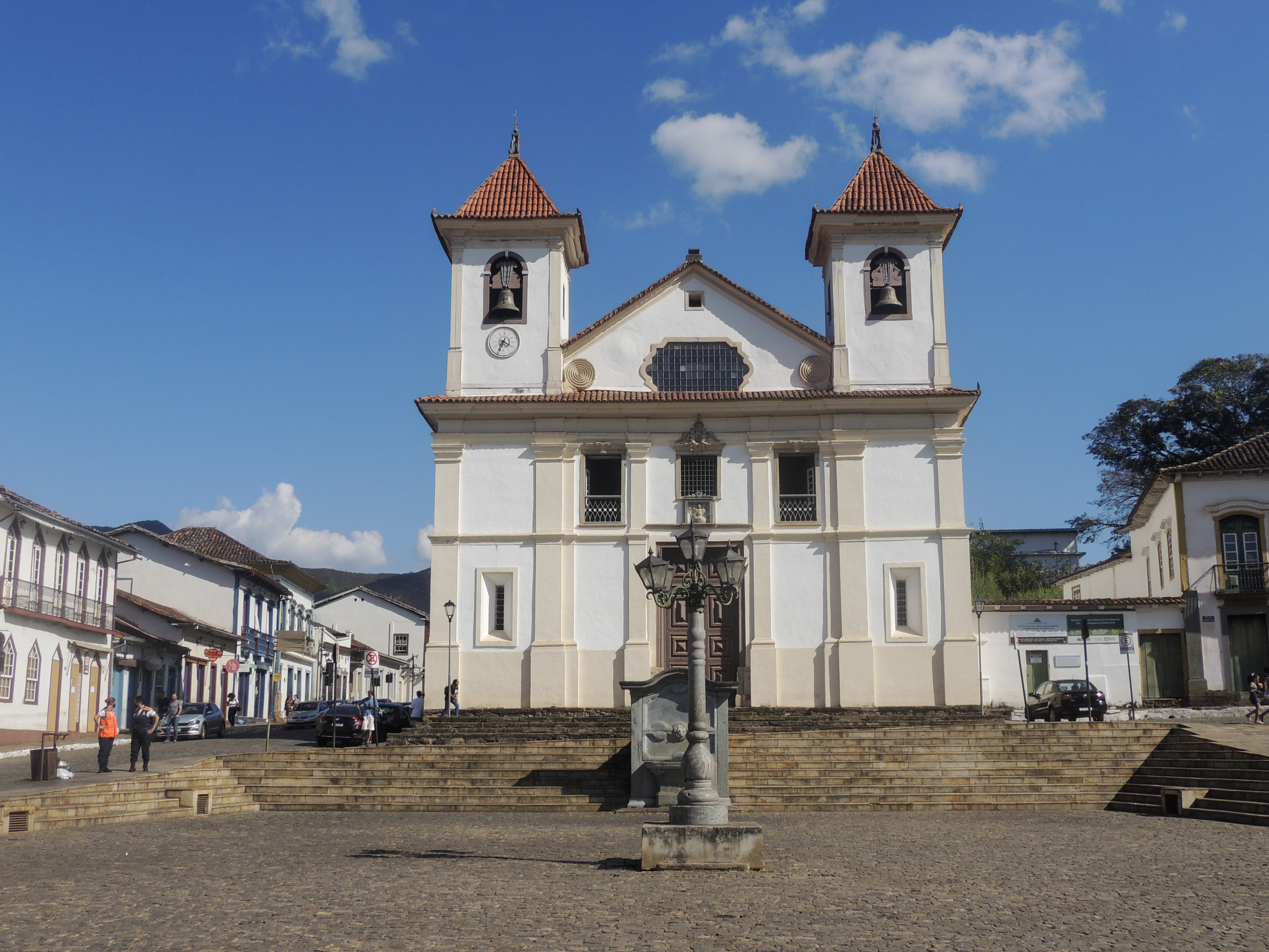
The cathedral and Praça da Sé

Pope Benedict XIV created the Diocese of Mariana on 6 December 1745 through the papal bull Candor lucis aeternae. The former parish church became its cathedral, with a new dedication to Our Lady of the Assumption. A royal charter issued by John V of Portugal on 2 May 1747 established the cathedral chapter. It provided for four dignitaries, ten canons, a chapel master, an organist, chaplains, choristers, and other officers. The first bishop, Manuel da Cruz, was solemnly installed in December 1748.

The cathedral was refitted for its new ceremonial use. The episcopal throne and stalls for the cathedral chapter were placed in the chancel. The Brotherhoods of the Blessed Sacrament and the Immaculate Conception moved from the chancel to new retables near the crossing. Work from 1751 to 1761 added the Chapel of the Blessed Sacrament and new plaster, ceilings, interior paint, and gilding. Manuel Rabelo de Sousa painted the chancel ceiling in 1760 and gilded the side altars. António José da Fonseca made the nave balustrades and the choir screen.

José Pereira Arouca kept a workshop at the cathedral for twenty-six years in the second half of the eighteenth century. Surviving contracts cover work on the organ, baptismal font, towers, sacristy, and cabinet room. The weak earth walls and damp ground led to recurring repairs. The exterior was rebuilt in stone and lime near the end of the century, while keeping the earlier form of the front.

The Diocese of Mariana became an archdiocese on 1 May 1906. Archbishop Oscar de Oliveira dedicated the cathedral on 15 July 1963. Pope Paul VI granted it the title of minor basilica on 27 November through the apostolic brief Erga almam Deiparam.

== Architecture and art ==
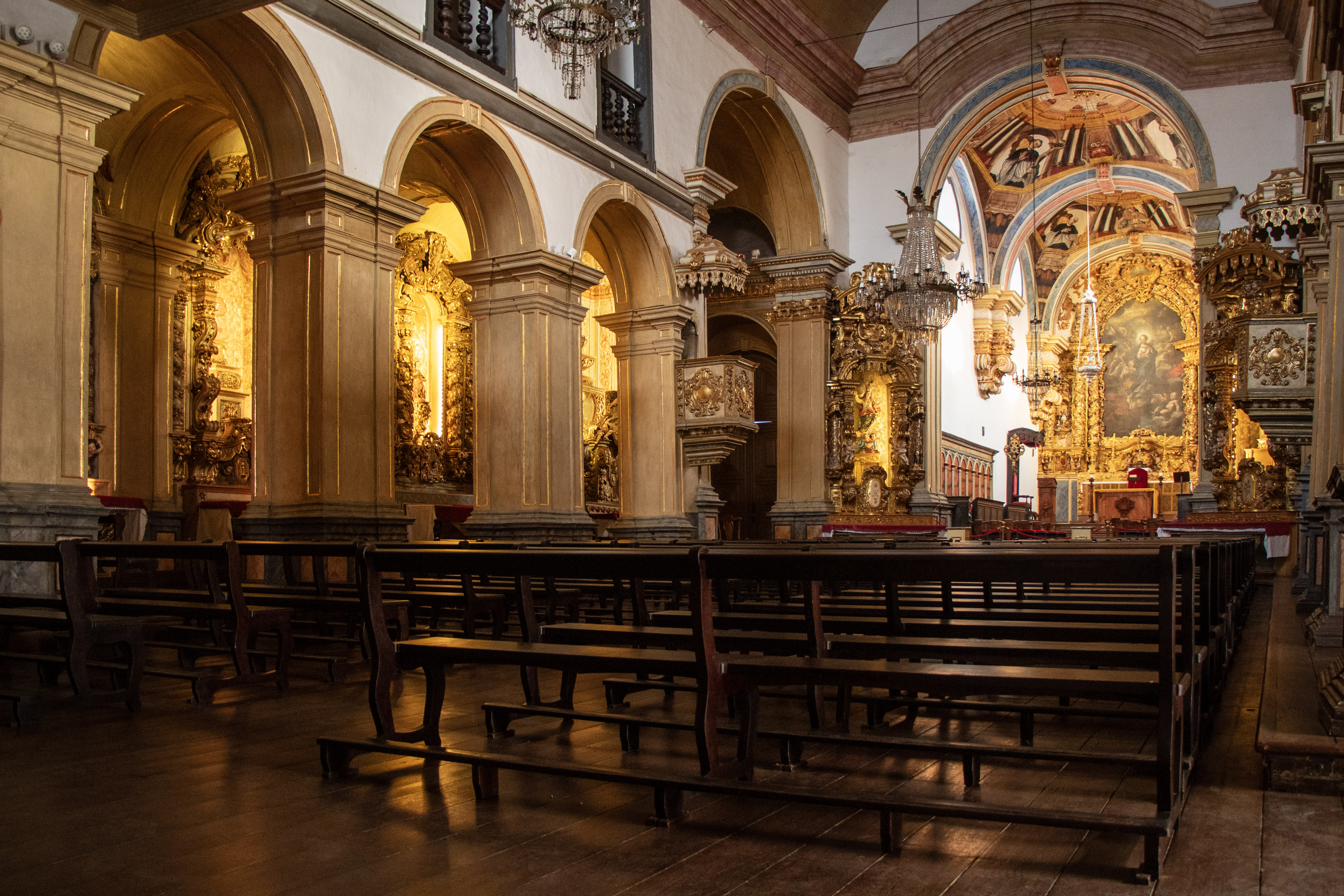
The nave, looking towards the chancel

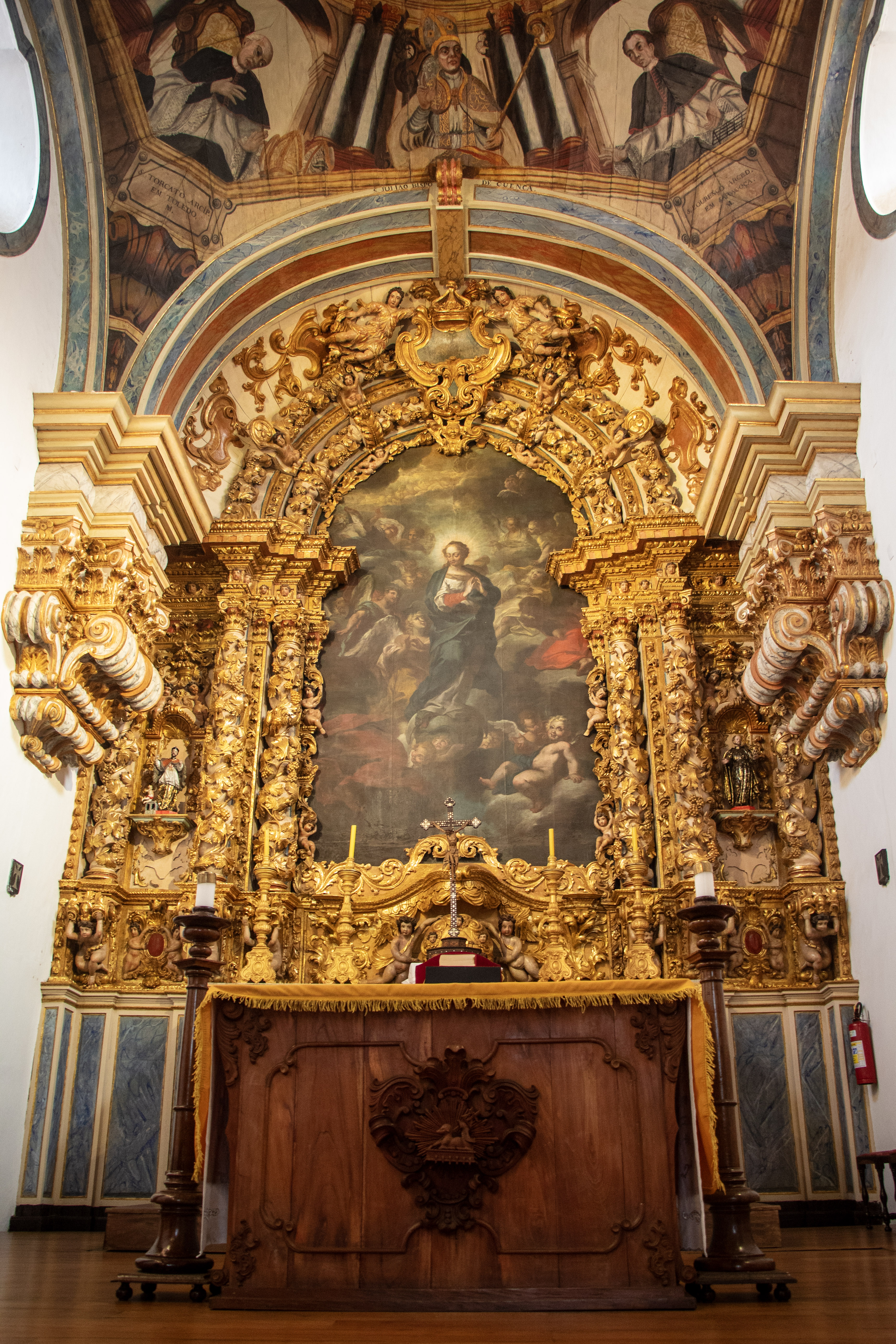
The main retable

The façade has a broad central section between two square bell towers. A single doorway opens below three straight-headed choir windows, and a triangular pediment closes the central bay. The design follows the tradition of arquitetura chã, the plain form of Portuguese Mannerism used in the first churches of Minas Gerais.

Inside, a central nave is flanked by narrow passages that give access to the side altars. Chapels beside the crossing create a shallow transept, and a large chancel arch frames the sanctuary. The woodwork was made in separate campaigns, so early Baroque retables stand beside later Johannine and Rococo pieces. The oldest side retable retains an image of Saint John the Evangelist, one of the patrons of the former parish church.

The main retable dates from the first phase of the building. Its carved throne has been lost, and the opening is now covered by a large early eighteenth-century painting of the Immaculate Conception, the cathedral's former patron. The change of dedication also altered the crossing. Images of the Immaculate Conception and Saint Joseph occupy paired retables set diagonally at the chancel arch.

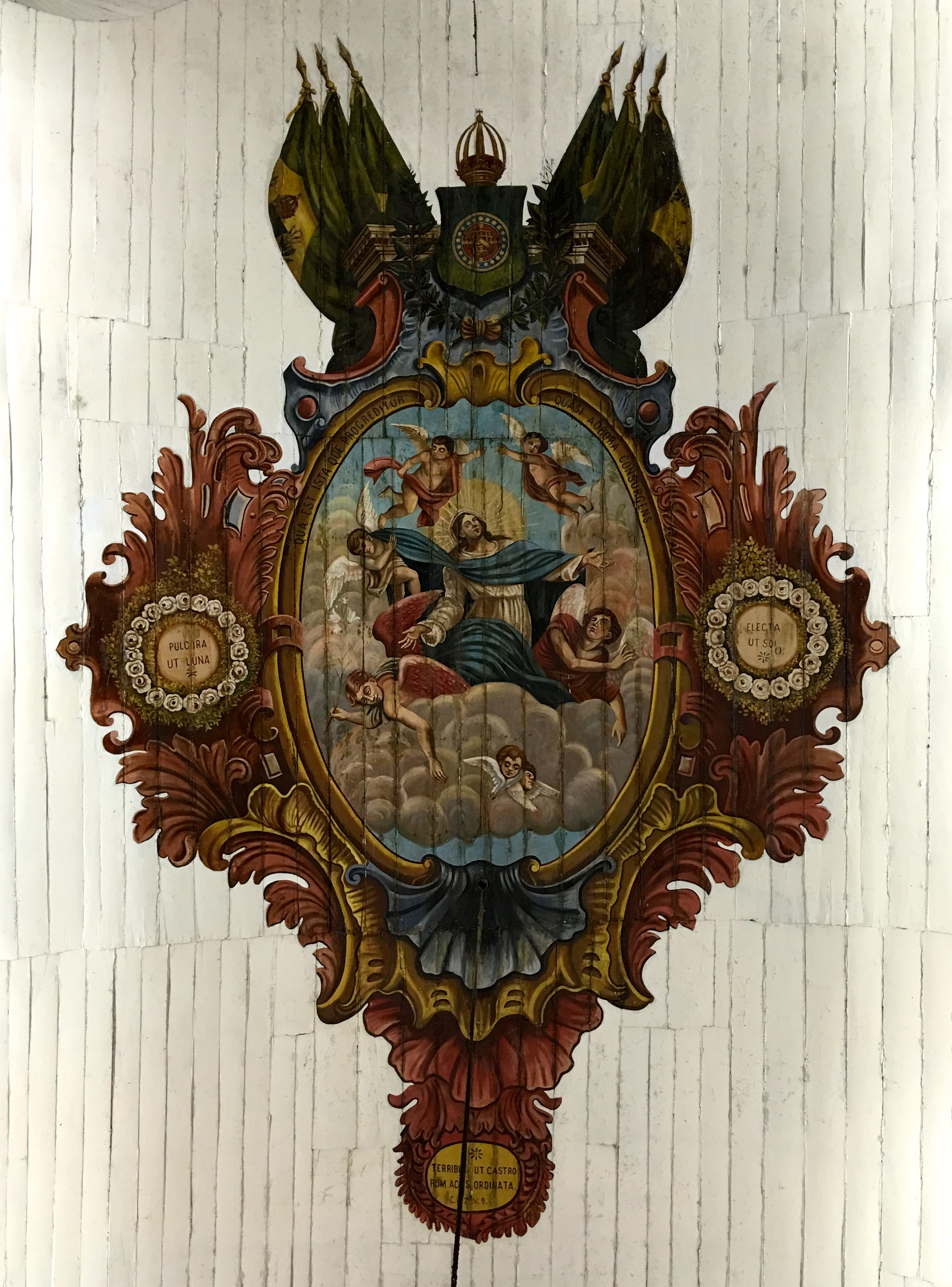
The Assumption medallion on the nave ceiling

The nave ceiling no longer has its first painted scheme. A late Rococo medallion shows the Assumption among angels, with the arms of the Empire of Brazil above it. In the chancel, Manuel Rabelo de Sousa's 1760 painting sets canonized clerics within an imaginary dome and painted architecture. The work belongs to a group of perspective ceilings made in Minas Gerais by painters trained in northern Portuguese methods. Below it, the carved choir stalls carry small paintings in a Chinese manner.

Chinoiserie also covers the organ case and the inner face of the wooden windscreen at the main entrance. The windscreen and the carved cover of the baptismal font are attributed to Francisco Vieira Servas. José Pereira Arouca made the stone basin, and a panel of the baptism of Jesus in the baptistery is attributed to Manuel da Costa Ataíde.

== Pipe organ ==
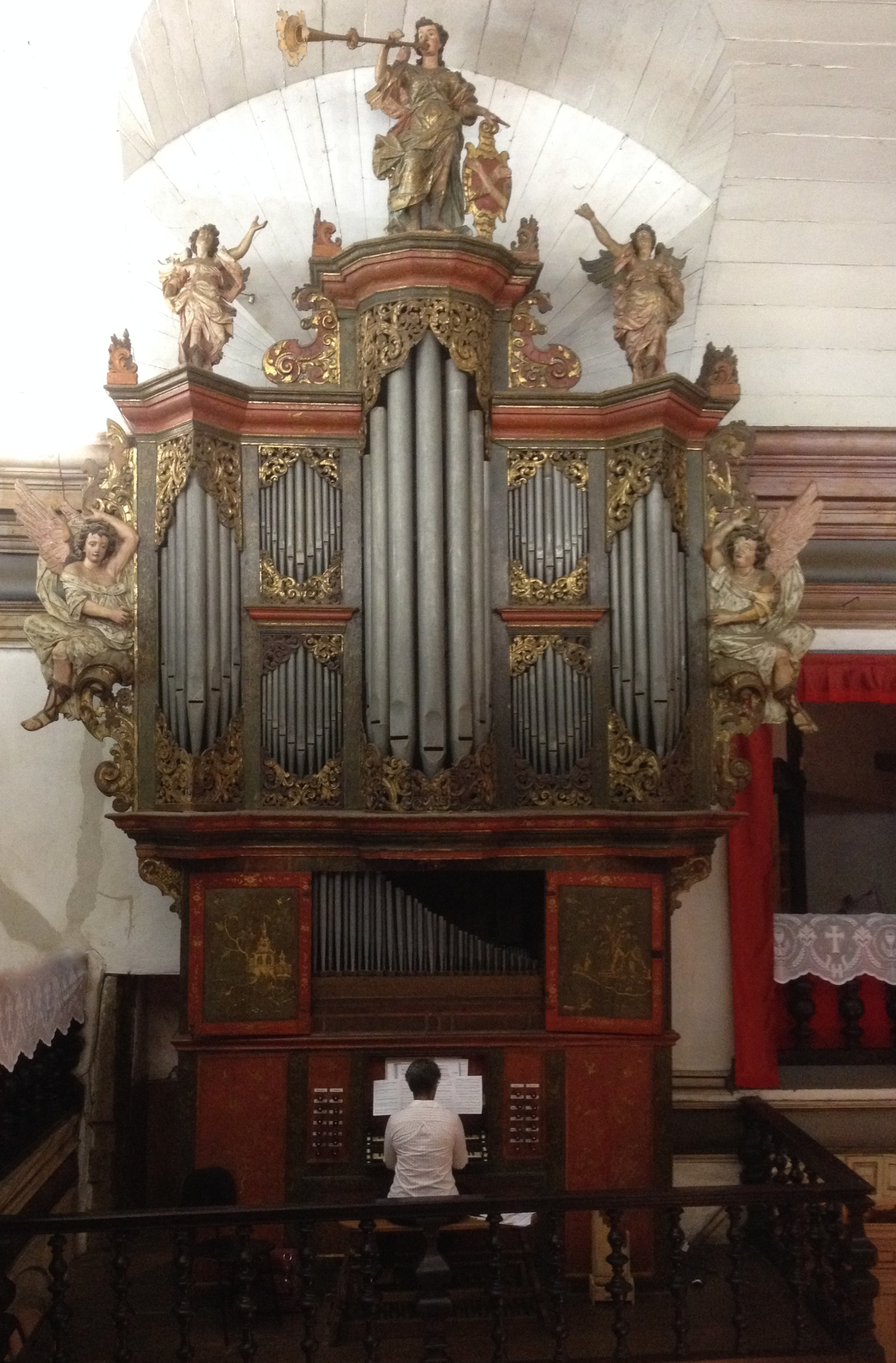
The eighteenth-century pipe organ

The cathedral received its pipe organ from Portugal in 1753, after the governor of Minas Gerais asked the Crown for an instrument and a clock in June 1752. The royal treasury paid for its installation in September 1753. Manuel Francisco Lisboa designed and built the side gallery below the choir that holds it. The instrument has 17 stops on two manuals.

The organ has long carried the name of the Hamburg builder Arp Schnitger. Its three-towered front follows the north German Hamburger Prospekt, and the case resembles that of the organ in Faro Cathedral in Portugal. No inscription or known document names Schnitger as its maker. Gerhard Doderer instead proposed Johann Heinrich Hulenkampf, a former Schnitger assistant who worked in Lisbon, as the builder. The Franciscan arms on the Mariana case and a 1723 date have led to the further proposal that it was made for the Convent of São Francisco in Lisbon. Comparison of the Mariana and Faro cases has found the same overall plan but different sculptural hands, which does not establish a common workshop.

The instrument fell silent in 1937. Beckerath Orgelbau restored it from 1980 to 1984, replacing missing pipes, keyboards, and other parts. A second campaign by Edskes Orgelbau from 2000 to 2002 restored the original manual keyboards, pipe dimensions, and an eighteenth-century tuning system. It was dismantled again when the cathedral closed in 2016. During reassembly in 2022, conservators found termite damage in the windchests. Frédéric Desmottes restored them in Cuenca, Spain, in 2025. The organ returned to use on 8 December 2025 after nine years without being played.

== Protection and restoration ==
IPHAN entered the cathedral in the Livro do Tombo das Belas Artes on 8 September 1939, under inscription 263 and process 75-T-1938. The designation covers the building and its contents. The cathedral also lies within the federally protected architectural and urban ensemble of Mariana.

The latest building campaign began in January 2016 through the federal Historic Cities Action Plan. It covered the structure, roof, drainage, water and sanitary systems, and archaeological monitoring. Later stages treated the ceilings, retables, arches, paintings, cornices, gilding, and lighting. IPHAN spent about R$10.6 million on the projects and work.

Paint sampling exposed an earlier palette of light beige and dark red beneath newer layers. Residents chose those colours at a public hearing in March 2017 by a vote of 51 to 10. The cathedral reopened on 15 December 2022.

== Gallery ==
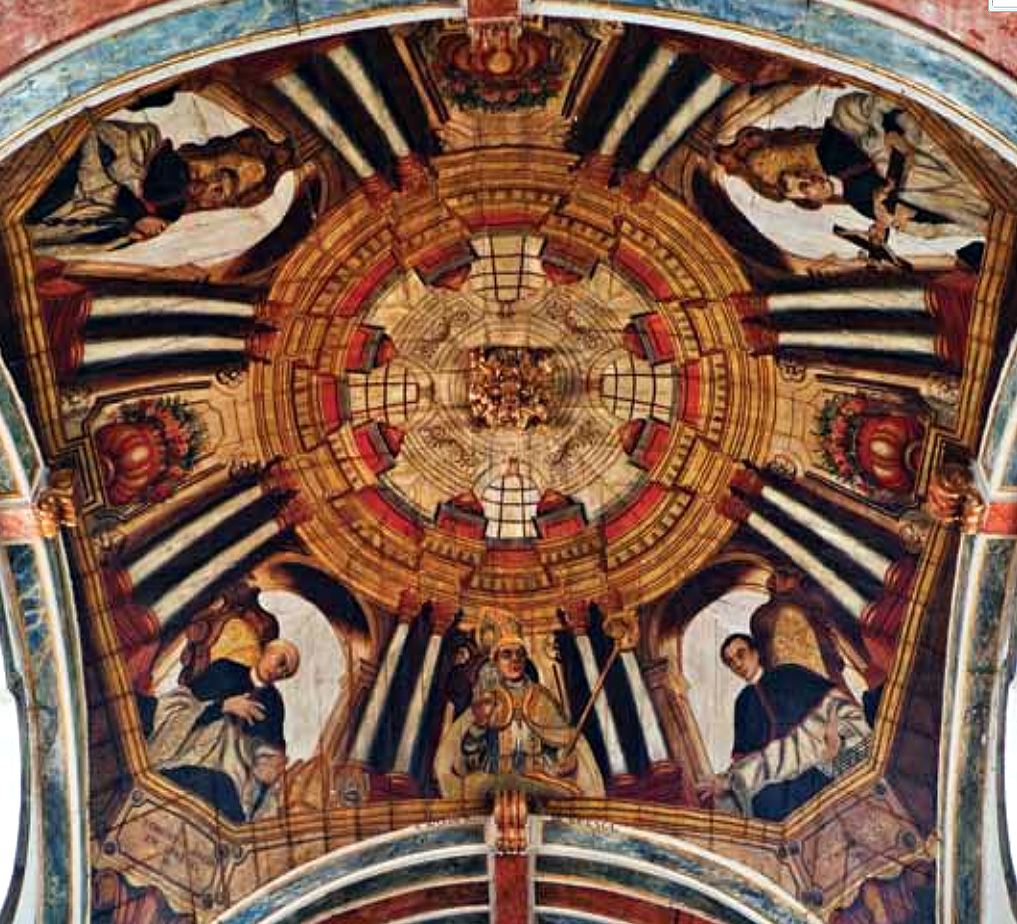
Painted ceiling of the chancel

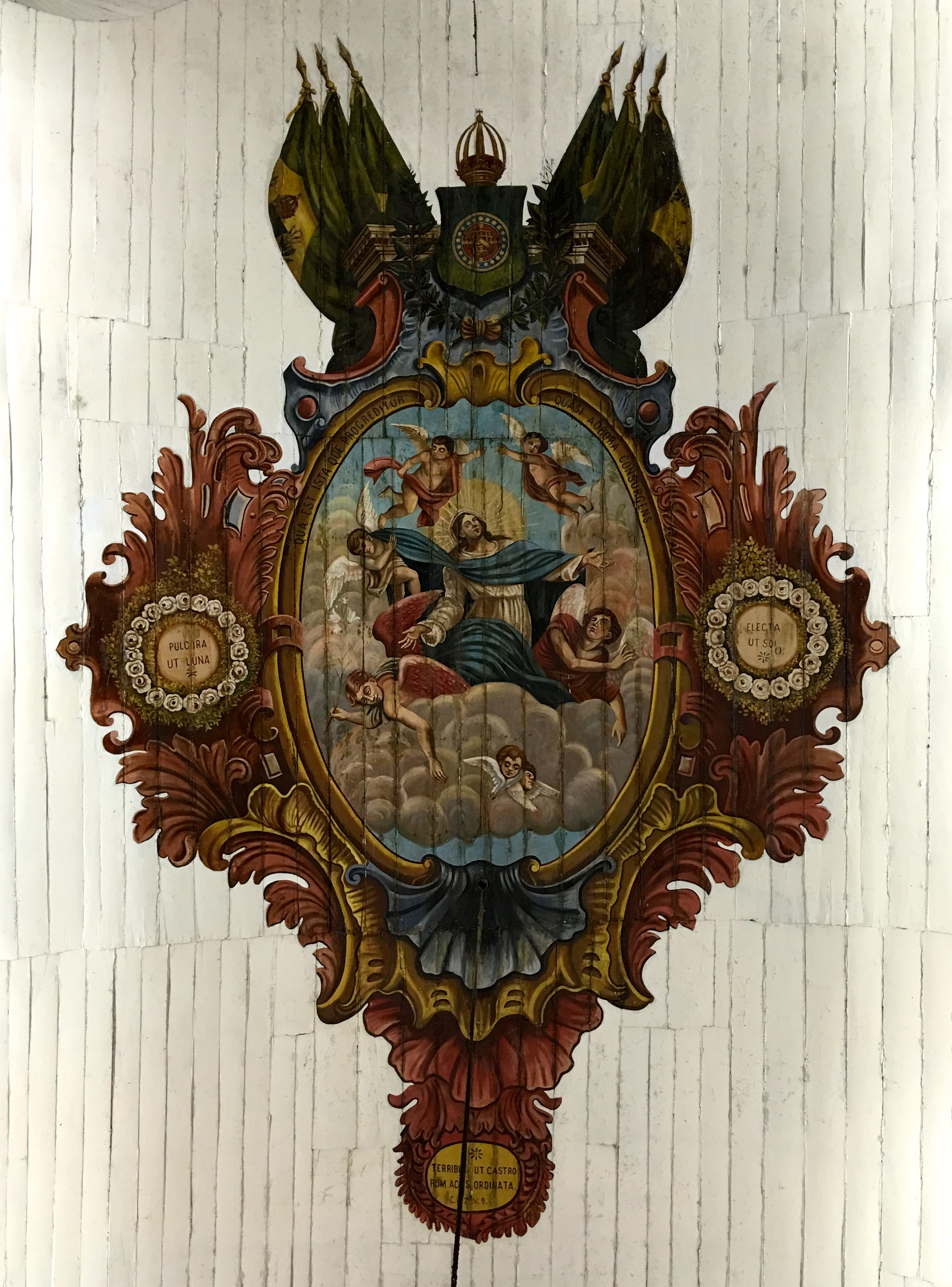
Assumption medallion on the nave ceiling

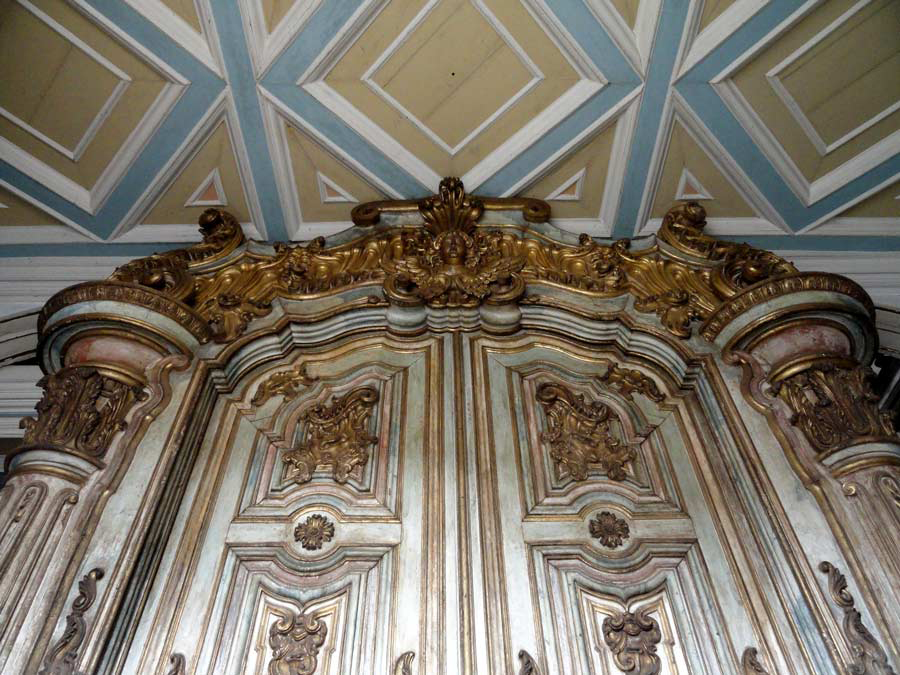
Painted and carved windscreen

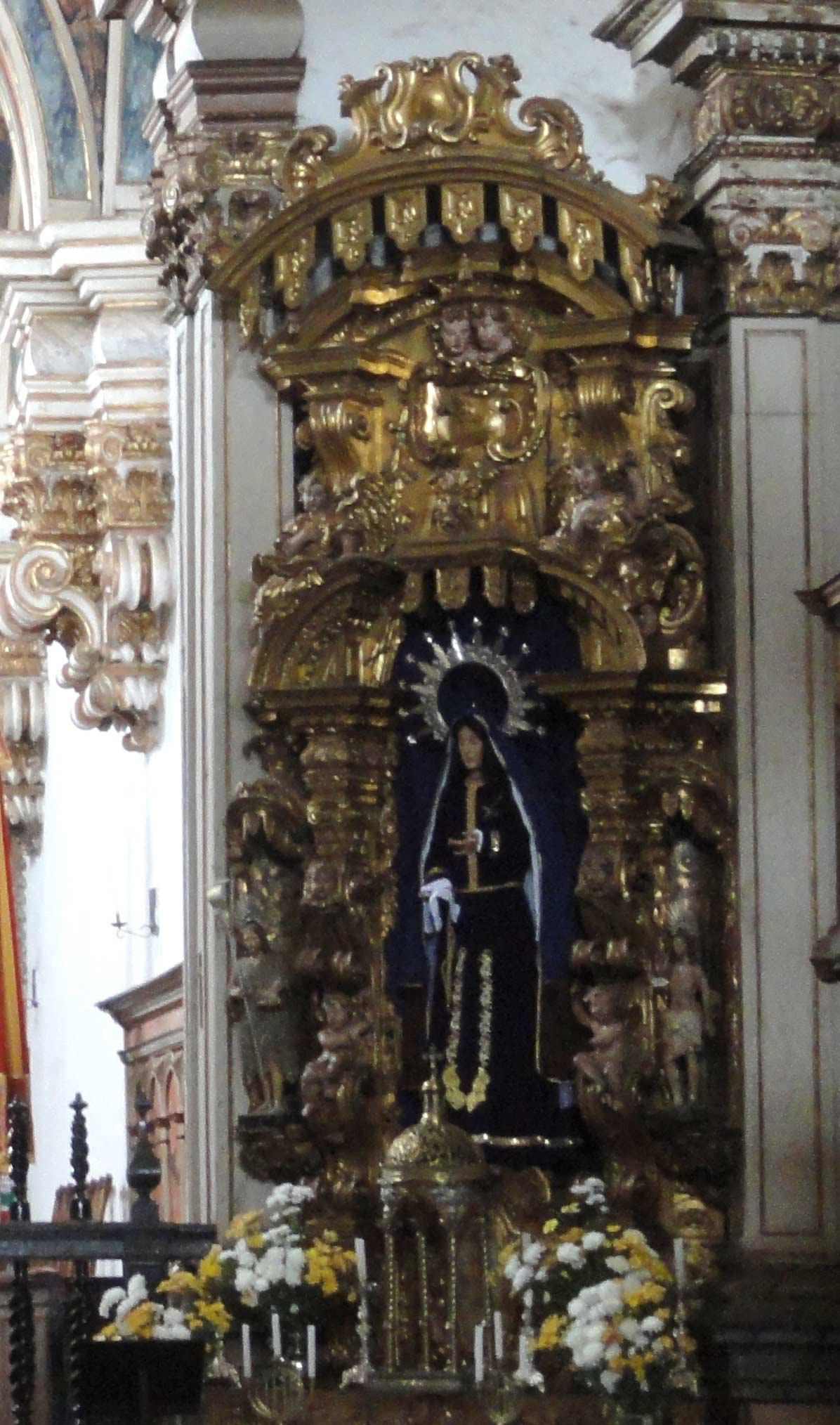
Side retable

== See also ==
- Roman Catholic Archdiocese of Mariana
- Baroque in Brazil
- Colonial architecture of Brazil
