= The Voice Kids (Brazilian TV series) season 6 =

The Voice Kids
- Season 6
- Hosted by: Márcio Garcia; Thalita Rebouças
- Coaches: Carlinhos Brown; Gaby Amarantos; Michel Teló
- No. of contestants: 73 artists
- Winner: Gustavo Bardim
- Winning coach: Michel Teló
- Runners-up: Helloysa do Pandeiro; Izabelle Ribeiro

Release
- Original network: TV Globo
- Original release: June 6 – September 26, 2021

Season chronology
- ← Previous; Season 5 Next → Season 7

The sixth season of The Voice Kids, premiered on TV Globo on June 6, 2021 in the 2:30 / 1:30 p.m. (BRT / AMT) daytime slot.

Carlinhos Brown returned for his sixth season as coach and was joined by Gaby Amarantos and Michel Teló, who replaced Claudia Leitte and Simone & Simaria.

André Marques left the show in order to host the new season of No Limite and was replaced by Márcio Garcia, while Thalita Rebouças returned for her fifth season as the backstage host.

== Teams ==
Key

Winner
Runner-up

Eliminated in the Finals
Eliminated in the Live shows

Eliminated in the Showdowns
Eliminated in the Battle rounds

Coaches	Top 73 artists				
Carlinhos Brown					
Carlinhos Brown	Helloysa do Pandeiro	Isabelly Sampaio	Sofia Farah	Elis Cristine	Allonso Pieroni
Carlinhos Brown	Maria Alice Xavier	João Vitor Kindel	Lorena França	Camilla Souto	Gyovanna Antunes
Carlinhos Brown	Isa Luz	Pedro Pires	Heryene	Mirella Vallandro	Nicole Falcão
Carlinhos Brown	Rayssa Rafaela	Alice Braga	Kaori Yokota	Isadora Lázaro	Bia Gurgel
Carlinhos Brown	Anabella Moura	Luna Mattos	Sofia Cardoso	Sophia Lara	
Gaby Amarantos					
Gaby Amarantos	Izabelle Ribeiro	Ruany Keven	Izadora Rodrigues	Lua Brunetti	Evellyn Katzer
Gaby Amarantos	Nicoly Lima	Clara Cintra	Mari Gonçalves	Ana Carolina Floriano	Babi Mello
Gaby Amarantos	Elana Rei	Luana Mello	Luísa Simões	Bel Moura	Rafa Chagas
Gaby Amarantos	Helena Bemelmans	Bia Dourado	Bia Miranda	Edu Lima Sanfoneiro	Jhonny Diniz
Gaby Amarantos	Clara Dantas	Luci Hofs	Mariane Reis	Marina Duarte	
Michel Teló					
Michel Teló	Gustavo Bardim	Maria Victória	Laís Menezes	Henrique Bonadio	Anna Clara Dias
Michel Teló	Manu Ferraz	Bianca Alves	Paulinho Arretado	Clarah Passos	Júlia Antonini
Michel Teló	Maria Alice Martins	Luiza Andrade	Mel	Brenda Tesseroli	Bryan Ferreira
Michel Teló	Pietro Rios	Raissa Diniz	João Arthur Brum	Lipe Araújo	Rafaela Carrer
Michel Teló	Valentina Corrêa	Bruna Stavale	Bryan Teles	Davi Lucas	Thiago Mendes

== Blind auditions ==
Key

✔	Coach pressed "I WANT YOU" button
	Artist defaulted to a coach's team
	Artist picked a coach's team
	Artist eliminated with no coach pressing their "I WANT YOU" button

Episode	Order	Artist	Age	Hometown	Song	Coach's and contestant's choices		
Episode	Order	Artist	Age	Hometown	Song	Brown	Gaby	Teló
Episode 1 (June 6, 2021)
Episode 1 (June 6, 2021)	1	Sofia Farah	9	Rio das Ostras	"Mercedes Benz"	✔	✔	✔
Episode 1 (June 6, 2021)	2	Edu Lima Sanfoneiro	13	Craíbas	"Verdadeiro Amor"	–	✔	✔
Episode 1 (June 6, 2021)	3	Rafaela Carrer	10	Piratininga	"Girl on Fire"	✔	✔	✔
Episode 1 (June 6, 2021)	4	João Vitor Kindel	14	Taió	"A Whole New World"	✔	–	–
Episode 1 (June 6, 2021)	5	Anna Clara Dias	12	João Pessoa	"No Dia Em Que Eu Saí de Casa"	✔	✔	✔
Episode 1 (June 6, 2021)	6	Bia Miranda	13	Niterói	"Tristeza"	✔	✔	–
Episode 1 (June 6, 2021)	7	Sarah Justus	14	Curitiba	"Somebody to Love"	–	–	–
Episode 1 (June 6, 2021)	8	Raissa Diniz	14	Funilândia	"Tijolinho por Tijolinho"	–	✔	✔
Episode 1 (June 6, 2021)	9	Kaori Yokota	9	Araçatuba	"You Raise Me Up"	✔	✔	✔
Episode 2 (June 13, 2021)
Episode 2 (June 13, 2021)	1	Valentina Corrêa	9	Porto Alegre	"Shake It Off"	✔	✔	✔
Episode 2 (June 13, 2021)	2	Bia Gurgel	14	Mossoró	"Como Nossos Pais"	✔	✔	✔
Episode 2 (June 13, 2021)	3	Luna Mattos	9	Santos	"A Lenda"	✔	–	–
Episode 2 (June 13, 2021)	4	Clara Dantas	13	João Pessoa	"Elastic Heart"	✔	✔	✔
Episode 2 (June 13, 2021)	5	Bryan Ferreira	10	Nova Friburgo	"Cowboy Fora da Lei"	✔	–	✔
Episode 2 (June 13, 2021)	6	Gustavo Bardim	11	Guaramirim	"Vida Vazia"	–	✔	✔
Episode 2 (June 13, 2021)	7	Vitória Heck	11	Porto Alegre	"Manhãs de Setembro"	–	–	–
Episode 2 (June 13, 2021)	8	Isadora Lázaro	13	Itanhaém	"Estrada do Sol"	✔	✔	✔
Episode 2 (June 13, 2021)	9	Luisa Simões	10	Campo Mourão	"Falsa Baiana"	–	✔	–
Episode 2 (June 13, 2021)	10	Davi Lucas	10	Manaus	"Into the Unknown"	✔	✔	✔
Episode 3 (June 20, 2021)	1	Laís Menezes	11	João Pessoa	"Feira De Mangaio"	✔	✔	✔
Episode 3 (June 20, 2021)	2	Evellyn Katzer	12	Camaquã	"Casinha Branca"	–	✔	–
Episode 3 (June 20, 2021)	3	Elis Cristine	10	Sete Lagoas	"Sampa"	✔	✔	–
Episode 3 (June 20, 2021)	4	Clarah Passos	12	São Paulo	"Ben"	✔	✔	✔
Episode 3 (June 20, 2021)	5	Jhonny Diniz	12	Princesa Isabel	"Algo Mais"	–	✔	–
Episode 3 (June 20, 2021)	6	Henrique Bonadio	13	Vinhedo	"Patience"	✔	✔	✔
Episode 3 (June 20, 2021)	7	Mirella Vallandro	13	Votorantim	"Oração"	✔	–	–
Episode 3 (June 20, 2021)	8	Elana Rei	13	Rio Negrinho	"Eu Vou Seguir (Reach)"	✔	✔	–
Episode 3 (June 20, 2021)	9	Isa Luz	13	Teresina	"Tiro ao Álvaro"	✔	✔	✔
Episode 4 (June 27, 2021)	1	Paulinho Arretado	9	Recife	"No Rancho Fundo"	✔	–	✔
Episode 4 (June 27, 2021)	2	Bel Moura	12	Guarabira	"Anjo Querubim"	–	✔	–
Episode 4 (June 27, 2021)	3	Luiza Andrade	13	Candelária	"Mudei"	✔	✔	✔
Episode 4 (June 27, 2021)	4	Alice Braga	13	Niterói	"Sangrando"	✔	✔	–
Episode 4 (June 27, 2021)	5	Marina Duarte	11	Sapucaia do Sul	"Dancin' Days"	–	✔	–
Episode 4 (June 27, 2021)	6	Luci Hofs	12	Balneário Camboriú	"Mercy"	–	✔	✔
Episode 4 (June 27, 2021)	7	Allonso Pieroni	14	Jacutinga	"Ainda ontem chorei de saudade"	✔	✔	–
Episode 4 (June 27, 2021)	8	Anny Bertholini	11	São José dos Campos	"Home"	–	–	–
Episode 4 (June 27, 2021)	9	Bianca Alves	14	Catanduvas	"Coração Bandido"	✔	✔	✔
Episode 4 (June 27, 2021)	10	Ana Carolina Floriano	13	São Bernardo do Campo	"Casa no Campo"	–	✔	–
Episode 4 (June 27, 2021)	11	Lorena França	10	Maceió	"Riacho do Navio"	✔	–	–
Episode 5 (July 4, 2021)	1	Maria Victória	12	Alto Piquiri	"Canarinho Prisioneiro"	✔	✔	✔
Episode 5 (July 4, 2021)	2	Sophia Lara	10	Miranda	"Cobaia"	✔	✔	–
Episode 5 (July 4, 2021)	3	Mari Gonçalves	11	Belo Horizonte	"Single Ladies (Put a Ring on It)"	–	✔	–
Episode 5 (July 4, 2021)	4	Pietro Rios	11	Tiradentes	"Eu Só Penso Em Você"	✔	✔	✔
Episode 5 (July 4, 2021)	5	Anabella Moura	11	Belém	"Pupila"	✔	–	–
Episode 5 (July 4, 2021)	6	Izadora Rodrigues	10	Teodoro Sampaio	"Meu Violão e o Nosso Cachorro"	–	✔	–
Episode 5 (July 4, 2021)	7	Kamilly	11	Caxias	"Coisa Linda"	–	–	–
Episode 5 (July 4, 2021)	8	Sofia Cardoso	10	Cascavel	"Uni-Duni-Tê"	✔	–	✔
Episode 5 (July 4, 2021)	9	Ruany Keviny	14	Rio Real	"Supera"	–	✔	–
Episode 5 (July 4, 2021)	10	Maria Alice Xaiver	12	Salvador	"Gelo"	✔	✔	–
Episode 6 (July 11, 2021)	1	Helloysa do Pandeiro	14	Areia	"O Canto da Ema"	✔	✔	–
Episode 6 (July 11, 2021)	2	Helena Bemelmans	13	São Paulo	"O Pato"	–	✔	–
Episode 6 (July 11, 2021)	3	Lipe Araújo	13	Charqueadas	"Amor Maior"	–	–	✔
Episode 6 (July 11, 2021)	4	Manu Ferraz	11	Santa Maria	"Evidências"	✔	✔	✔
Episode 6 (July 11, 2021)	5	Bia Dourado	11	Belém	"Someone You Loved"	–	✔	–
Episode 6 (July 11, 2021)	6	Mariane Reis	13	Socorro	"Seio de Minas"	✔	✔	–
Episode 6 (July 11, 2021)	7	Gyovanna Antunes	13	Juazeiro	"Conto de Areia"	✔	–	–
Episode 6 (July 11, 2021)	8	Bryan Teles	12	Vargeão	"Será Que Foi Saudade"	✔	✔	✔
Episode 6 (July 11, 2021)	9	Lua Brunetti	13	Florianópolis	"Esse Tal De Rock Enrow"	–	✔	–
Episode 6 (July 11, 2021)	10	Isabely Sampaio	13	Conceição de Macabu	"Chega de Saudade"	✔	✔	✔
Episode 7 (July 18, 2021)	1	Clara Cintra	14	Itaparica	"Açaí"	–	✔	–
Episode 7 (July 18, 2021)	2	Bruna Stavale	14	Rio de Janeiro	"When I Was Your Man"	✔	✔	✔
Episode 7 (July 18, 2021)	3	Mel	11	Feira de Santana	"Perfeitinha"	–	–	✔
Episode 7 (July 18, 2021)	4	Luana Mello	13	São Paulo	"Total Eclipse of the Heart"	✔	✔	–
Episode 7 (July 18, 2021)	5	Pedro Pires	12	Volta Redonda	"Ai, Amor"	✔	–	–
Episode 7 (July 18, 2021)	6	Nicole Falcão	11	Vitória	"Perfect"	✔	✔	✔
Episode 7 (July 18, 2021)	7	Isis Lisboa	11	Montes Claros	"Jura Juradinho"	–	–	–
Episode 7 (July 18, 2021)	8	Thiago Mendes	13	Betim	"Fogão de Lenha"	✔	✔	✔
Episode 7 (July 18, 2021)	9	Rafa Chagas	14	Formiga	"Simples e Romântico"	–	✔	–
Episode 7 (July 18, 2021)	10	Rayssa Rafaela	12	Araucária	"Minha Felicidade"	✔	✔	✔
Episode 8 (July 25, 2021)	1	João Arthur Brum	10	Três Rios	"Cores do Vento"	✔	✔	✔
Episode 8 (July 25, 2021)	2	Camilla Souto	14	São Sebastião	"Dois Corações"	✔	–	–
Episode 8 (July 25, 2021)	3	Brenda Tesseroli	14	Palmas	"Morena"	✔	✔	✔
Episode 8 (July 25, 2021)	4	Isa Beraldo	12	Piumhi	"Wave"	–	–	–
Episode 8 (July 25, 2021)	5	Izabelle Ribeiro	14	Manaus	"A Bela e a Fera"	✔	✔	✔
Episode 8 (July 25, 2021)	6	Babi Mello	12	Franca	"Céu Azul"	–	✔	–
Episode 8 (July 25, 2021)	7	Heryene	10	Perdões	"Havana"	✔	✔	–
Episode 8 (July 25, 2021)	8	Maria Alice Martins	11	Araxá	"This Is Me"	Team full	✔	✔
Episode 8 (July 25, 2021)	9	Nicoly Lima	14	Jaú	"Força Estranha"	Team full	✔	Team full
Episode 8 (July 25, 2021)	10	Júlia Antonini	13	Palmeira das Missões	"Love of My Life"	✔	✔	✔

== The Battles ==
Key

Artist won the Battle and advanced to the Showdowns
Artist lost the Battle and was eliminated

Episode	Coach	Order	Winner	Song	Losers	
Episode 9 (August 1, 2021)	Gaby Amarantos	1	Lua Brunetti	"Levitating"	Clara Dantas	Luci Hofs
Episode 9 (August 1, 2021)	Carlinhos Brown	2	Lorena França	"Anunciação"	Sophia Lara	Anabella Moura
Episode 9 (August 1, 2021)	Michel Teló	3	Gustavo Bardim	"Você Vai Ver"	Thiago Mendes	Bryan Teles
Episode 9 (August 1, 2021)	Gaby Amarantos	4	Clara Cintra	"Ando Meio Desligado"	Mariane Reis	Marina Duarte
Episode 9 (August 1, 2021)	Michel Teló	5	Ana Clara Dias	"A Thousand Years"	Davi Lucas	Bruna Stavale
Episode 9 (August 1, 2021)	Carlinhos Brown	6	Maria Alice Xavier	"Sina"	Sofia Cardoso	Luna Mattos
Episode 10 (August 8, 2021)	Carlinhos Brown	1	Sofia Farah	"Let It Be"	Kaori Yokota	Alice Braga
Episode 10 (August 8, 2021)	Michel Teló	2	Manu Ferraz	"Tristeza do Jeca"	João Arthur Brum	Lipe Araújo
Episode 10 (August 8, 2021)	Gaby Amarantos	3	Mari Gonçalves	"Dance Monkey"	Bia Miranda	Bia Dourado
Episode 10 (August 8, 2021)	Michel Teló	4	Laís Menezes	"Trevo (Tu)"	Rafaela Carrer	Valentina Corrêa
Episode 10 (August 8, 2021)	Carlinhos Brown	5	Isabelly Sampaio	"The Girl from Ipanema"	Isadora Lázaro	Bia Gurgel
Episode 10 (August 8, 2021)	Gaby Amarantos	6	Ruany Keven	"Espumas ao Vento"	Edu Lima Sanfoneiro	Jhonny Diniz
Episode 11 (August 15, 2021)	Michel Teló	1	Paulinho Arretado	"Não Aprendi Dizer Adeu"	Bryan Ferreira	Pietro Rios
Episode 11 (August 15, 2021)	Gaby Amarantos	2	Nicoly Lima	"Estúpido Cupido"	Helena Bemelmans	Rafa Chagas
Episode 11 (August 15, 2021)	Carlinhos Brown	3	João Vitor Kindel	"(I've Had) The Time of My Life"	Mirella Vallandro	Nicole Falcão
Episode 11 (August 15, 2021)	Michel Teló	4	Maria Victória	"Tudo Que Você Quiser"	Raissa Diniz	Brenda Tesseroli
Episode 11 (August 15, 2021)	Gaby Amarantos	5	Izadora Rodrigues	"Tropicana"	Bel Moura	Luisa Simões
Episode 11 (August 15, 2021)	Carlinhos Brown	6	Elis Cristine	"João e Maria"	Heryene	Rayssa Rafaela
Episode 12 (August 22, 2021)	Michel Teló	1	Bianca Alves	"Facas"	Mel	Luiza Andrade
Episode 12 (August 22, 2021)	Carlinhos Brown	2	Allonso Pieroni	"Negro Gato"	Pedro Pires	Isa Luz
Episode 12 (August 22, 2021)	Carlinhos Brown	3	Helloysa do Pandeiro	"Peça Felicidade"	Gyovanna Antunes	Camilla Souto
Episode 12 (August 22, 2021)	Gaby Amarantos	4	Izabelle Ribeiro	"Se Eu Não Te Amasse Tanto Assim"	Luana Mello	Elana Rei
Episode 12 (August 22, 2021)	Gaby Amarantos	5	Evellyn Katzer	"Não Vá Embora"	Ana Carolina Floriano	Babi Mello
Episode 12 (August 22, 2021)	Michel Teló	6	Henrique Bonadio	"Hey Jude"	Clarah Passos, Júlia Antonini, Maria Alice Martins	

== Showdowns ==
Artist was chosen by their coach and advanced to the Live shows
Artist was eliminated

Episode	Coach	Order	Artist	Song	Result
Episode 13 (August 29, 2021)	Gaby Amarantos	1	Clara Cintra	"Don't Start Now"	Eliminated
Episode 13 (August 29, 2021)	Gaby Amarantos	2	Izabelle Ribeiro	"Falando Sério"	Coach's choice
Episode 13 (August 29, 2021)	Gaby Amarantos	3	Lua Brunetti	"Superstition"	Coach's choice
Episode 13 (August 29, 2021)	Gaby Amarantos	4	Mari Gonçalves	"Menina Solta"	Eliminated
Episode 13 (August 29, 2021)	Michel Teló	5	Bianca Alves	"Um Degrau Na Escada"	Eliminated
Episode 13 (August 29, 2021)	Michel Teló	6	Gustavo Bardim	"Shallow"	Coach's choice
Episode 13 (August 29, 2021)	Michel Teló	7	Laís Menezes	"Gostoso Demais"	Coach's choice
Episode 13 (August 29, 2021)	Michel Teló	8	Paulinho Arretado	"Um Degrau Na Escada"	Eliminated
Episode 13 (August 29, 2021)	Carlinhos Brown	9	Isabelly Sampaio	"Desafinado"	Coach's choice
Episode 13 (August 29, 2021)	Carlinhos Brown	10	João Vitor Kindel	"Apenas Mais Uma de Amor"	Eliminated
Episode 13 (August 29, 2021)	Carlinhos Brown	11	Lorena França	"Foi Pá Pum"	Eliminated
Episode 13 (August 29, 2021)	Carlinhos Brown	12	Sofia Farah	"Brasil"	Coach's choice
Episode 14 (September 5, 2021)	Carlinhos Brown	1	Allonso Pieroni	"É o Amor"	Eliminated
Episode 14 (September 5, 2021)	Carlinhos Brown	2	Elis Cristine	"Billie Jean"	Coach's choice
Episode 14 (September 5, 2021)	Carlinhos Brown	3	Helloysa do Pandeiro	"Chiclete com Banana"	Coach's choice
Episode 14 (September 5, 2021)	Carlinhos Brown	4	Maria Alice Xavier	"Tempo de Alegria"	Eliminated
Episode 14 (September 5, 2021)	Gaby Amarantos	5	Evellyn Katzer	"20 e Poucos Anos"	Eliminated
Episode 14 (September 5, 2021)	Gaby Amarantos	6	Izadora Rodrigues	"Medo Bobo"	Coach's choice
Episode 14 (September 5, 2021)	Gaby Amarantos	7	Nicoly Lima	"Leave the Door Open"	Eliminated
Episode 14 (September 5, 2021)	Gaby Amarantos	8	Ruany Keven	"Disk Me"	Coach's choice
Episode 14 (September 5, 2021)	Michel Teló	9	Anna Clara Dias	"Retrovisor"	Eliminated
Episode 14 (September 5, 2021)	Michel Teló	10	Henrique Bonadio	"Crazy Train"	Coach's choice
Episode 14 (September 5, 2021)	Michel Teló	11	Manu Ferraz	"Dois Corações e Uma História"	Eliminated
Episode 14 (September 5, 2021)	Michel Teló	12	Maria Victória	"Te Amar Foi Ilusão"	Coach's choice

== Live shows ==
=== Elimination chart ===
Key

- Team Brown
- Team Gaby
- Team Teló

Results

- Winner
- Runner-up
- Saved by the public
- Saved by the coach
- Advanced to the final
- Eliminated

Live shows results per week
Artist	Week 1	Week 2	Week 3	
Artist	Week 1	Week 2	Round 1	Round 2
Gustavo Bardim	Safe	Safe	Safe	Winner
Helloysa do Pandeiro	Safe	Safe	Safe	Runner-up
Izabelle Ribeiro	Safe	Safe	Safe	Runner-up
Isabelly Sampaio	Safe	Safe	Eliminated	Eliminated (week 3)
Maria Victória	Safe	Safe	Eliminated	Eliminated (week 3)
Ruany Keven	Safe	Safe	Eliminated	Eliminated (week 3)
Izadora Rodrigues	Safe	Eliminated	Eliminated (week 2)	
Laís Menezes	Safe	Eliminated	Eliminated (week 2)	
Sofia Farah	Safe	Eliminated	Eliminated (week 2)	
Elis Cristine	Eliminated	Eliminated (week 1)		
Henrique Bonadio	Eliminated	Eliminated (week 1)		
Lua Brunetti	Eliminated	Eliminated (week 1)		

=== Week 1: Quarterfinals ===
Episode	Coach	Order	Artist	Song	Result
Episode 15 (September 12, 2021)	Carlinhos Brown	1	Elis Cristine	"O Que é, O Que é?"	Eliminated
Episode 15 (September 12, 2021)	Carlinhos Brown	2	Helloysa do Pandeiro	"Eu Só Quero Um Xodó"	Public's vote (37.55%)
Episode 15 (September 12, 2021)	Carlinhos Brown	3	Isabelly Sampaio	"Avião"	Coach's choice
Episode 15 (September 12, 2021)	Carlinhos Brown	4	Sofia Farah	"I Don't Want to Miss a Thing"	Coach's choice
Episode 15 (September 12, 2021)	Gaby Amarantos	5	Izabelle Ribeiro	"Sementes do Amanhã"	Coach's choice
Episode 15 (September 12, 2021)	Gaby Amarantos	6	Izadora Rodrigues	"Velha Roupa Colorida"	Coach's choice
Episode 15 (September 12, 2021)	Gaby Amarantos	7	Lua Brunetti	"Born to Be Wild"	Eliminated
Episode 15 (September 12, 2021)	Gaby Amarantos	8	Ruany Keven	"De Quem é a Culpa?"	Public's vote (32.15%)
Episode 15 (September 12, 2021)	Michel Teló	9	Gustavo Bardim	"Disparada"	Public's vote (47.88%)
Episode 15 (September 12, 2021)	Michel Teló	10	Henrique Bonadio	"Vou Deixar"	Eliminated
Episode 15 (September 12, 2021)	Michel Teló	11	Laís Menezes	"Sabiá"	Coach's choice
Episode 15 (September 12, 2021)	Michel Teló	12	Maria Victória	"Se Deus Me Ouvisse"	Coach's choice

=== Week 2: Semifinals ===
Episode	Coach	Order	Artist	Song	Result
Episode 16 (September 19, 2021)	Gaby Amarantos	1	Izabelle Ribeiro	"Tente Outra Vez"	Coach's choice
Episode 16 (September 19, 2021)	Gaby Amarantos	2	Izadora Rodrigues	"Telefone Mudo"	Eliminated
Episode 16 (September 19, 2021)	Gaby Amarantos	3	Ruany Keven	"Pesadão"	Public's vote (35.58%)
Episode 16 (September 19, 2021)	Carlinhos Brown	4	Helloysa do Pandeiro	"Aquarela Nordestina"	Public's vote (42.65%)
Episode 16 (September 19, 2021)	Carlinhos Brown	5	Isabelly Sampaio	"Samba de Uma Nota Só"	Coach's choice
Episode 16 (September 19, 2021)	Carlinhos Brown	6	Sofia Farah	"Chandelier"	Eliminated
Episode 16 (September 19, 2021)	Michel Teló	7	Gustavo Bardim	"Thinking Out Loud"	Public's vote (50.85%)
Episode 16 (September 19, 2021)	Michel Teló	8	Laís Menezes	"Forró do Xenhemnhem"	Eliminated
Episode 16 (September 19, 2021)	Michel Teló	9	Maria Victória	"Você Mudou"	Coach's choice

=== Week 3: Finals ===
Episode	Coach	Order	Artist	Song	Result
Episode 17 (September 26, 2021)	Gaby Amarantos	1	Izabelle Ribeiro	"Como Vai Você?"	Public's vote (57.45%)
Episode 17 (September 26, 2021)	Gaby Amarantos	2	Ruany Keven	"Regime Fechado"	Eliminated
Episode 17 (September 26, 2021)	Carlinhos Brown	3	Helloysa do Pandeiro	"Baião"	Public's vote (56.58%)
Episode 17 (September 26, 2021)	Carlinhos Brown	4	Isabelly Sampaio	"Madalena"	Eliminated
Episode 17 (September 26, 2021)	Michel Teló	5	Gustavo Bardim	"Yesterday"	Public's vote (59.57%)
Episode 17 (September 26, 2021)	Michel Teló	6	Maria Victória	"Pense em Mim"	Eliminated
Episode 17 (September 26, 2021)	Michel Teló	1	Gustavo Bardim	"Como É Grande o Meu Amor Por Você"	Winner (65.38%)
Episode 17 (September 26, 2021)	Carlinhos Brown	2	Helloysa do Pandeiro	"De Volta pro Aconchego"	Runner-up
Episode 17 (September 26, 2021)	Gaby Amarantos	3	Izabelle Ribeiro	"Maria, Maria"	Runner-up

== Ratings and reception ==
=== Brazilian ratings ===
All numbers are in points and provided by Kantar Ibope Media.

Episode	Title	Air date	Timeslot (BRT)	SP viewers (in points)	Source
1	The Blind Auditions 1	June 6, 2021	Sunday 2:30 p.m.	13.2	
2	The Blind Auditions 2	June 13, 2021	Sunday 2:30 p.m.	11.4	
3	The Blind Auditions 3	June 20, 2021	Sunday 2:30 p.m.	12.8	
4	The Blind Auditions 4	June 27, 2021	Sunday 2:30 p.m.	11.2	
5	The Blind Auditions 5	July 4, 2021	Sunday 2:30 p.m.	12.8	
6	The Blind Auditions 6	July 11, 2021	Sunday 2:30 p.m.	10.6	
7	The Blind Auditions 7	July 18, 2021	Sunday 2:30 p.m.	11.2	
8	The Blind Auditions 8	July 25, 2021	Sunday 2:30 p.m.	12.5	
9	The Battles 1	August 1, 2021	Sunday 2:30 p.m.	13.3	
10	The Battles 2	August 8, 2021	Sunday 2:30 p.m.	10.2	
11	The Battles 3	August 15, 2021	Sunday 2:30 p.m.	11.9	
12	The Battles 4	August 22, 2021	Sunday 2:30 p.m.	09.9	
13	Showdown 1	August 29, 2021	Sunday 2:30 p.m.	13.9	
14	Showdown 2	September 5, 2021	Sunday 2:30 p.m.	11.2	
15	Quarterfinals	September 12, 2021	Sunday 2:30 p.m.	12.5	
16	Semifinals	September 19, 2021	Sunday 2:30 p.m.	13.2	
17	Finals	September 26, 2021	Sunday 2:30 p.m.	13.3	

- In 2021, each point represents 268.278 households in 15 market cities in Brazil (76.577 households in São Paulo).
