= The Voice Kids (Brazilian TV series) season 5 =

The Voice Kids
- Season 5
- Hosted by: André Marques; Thalita Rebouças
- Coaches: Carlinhos Brown; Claudia Leitte; Mumuzinho; Simone & Simaria
- Winner: Kauê Penna
- Winning coach: Carlinhos Brown

Release
- Original network: TV Globo
- Original release: January 5 – October 11, 2020

Season chronology
- ← Previous; Season 4 Next → Season 6

The fifth season of The Voice Kids, premiered on TV Globo on January 5, 2020 in the 1:00 / 12:00 p.m. (BRT / AMT) daytime slot.

On March 18, 2020, TV Globo announced that the live shows which were scheduled to begin on March 29 (following a two-week hiatus due to the 2020 Bahrain Grand Prix scheduled broadcast), would be postponed until later in the year due to the COVID-19 pandemic. Five episodes featuring highlights from the blind auditions and the battles aired during the hiatus.

On August 7, 2020, TV Globo confirmed that the season would return on September 13, 2020, with a special pre-taped episode. The live shows were reduced from five to four and changed to remote shows with pre-recorded performances at the contestants' home.

On September 11, 2020, Claudia Leitte announced that she would not return for the final stage of the competition and her team would be coached by singer Mumuzinho instead, thus making it the first season to have two afro-Brazilian coaches.

On October 11, 2020, Kauê Penna from Team Brown won the competition with 50.50% of the final vote over Maria Eduarda Ribeiro (Team Claudia / Mumuzinho) and Paulo Gomiz (Team Simone & Simaria). This marks Brown's first and only win as a coach in the Kids series, thus becoming the first coach to win both versions of the show in Brazil until Michel Teló accomplished the same thing the following season.

== Teams ==
Key

- Winner
- Runner-up
- Eliminated in the Live shows
- Eliminated in the Battle rounds

Coaches	Top 72 artists					
Carlinhos Brown						
Carlinhos Brown	Kauê Penna	Karen Silva	Luísa Martins	Matheus Martins	Loren Medeiros	Sophia Marie
Carlinhos Brown	Arthur Luz	Carol Breder	Alice Araújo	Ana Carolina Julio	Ana Luiza Salgueiro	Arthur Galvani
Carlinhos Brown	Arthur Patta	Artur Ortega	Brenda Gonçalves	Gaby Novais	Giovanna de Luca	Julia Gomes
Carlinhos Brown	Laura Rodrigues	Letícia Prudêncio	Mabê Neves	Marilia Tavares	Milena Schmitz	Turí
Simone & Simaria						
Simone & Simaria	Paulo Gomiz	Felipinho	Manu Guimarães	Vinne Ramos	Milly Vitória	Natielly Rocha
Simone & Simaria	Gusttavo Salles	Hellen Sandy	Benício Abraão	Cybeli Cardoso	Davi Anderson	Enzo Zakimi
Simone & Simaria	Giovana Costa	Giovanna Brilhante	Júlia Lima	Laura Luna	Luank Dias	Myrella Fernanda
Simone & Simaria	Pablo Paludo	Pedro Lucas	Ranon Fernandes	Rayne Almeida	Venícios Melo	Welcson Viegas
Claudia Leitte (& Mumuzinho)						
Claudia Leitte (& Mumuzinho)	Maria Eduarda Ribeiro	Analu Sampaio	Giovana Aguilera	Lucas Mohallem	Guilherme Simões	Victor Hugo Mendes
Claudia Leitte (& Mumuzinho)	Duda de Paula	Lívia Corrêa	Adryel Freitas	Ana Clara Martins	Ana Júlia Poletto	Anais Waucampt
Claudia Leitte (& Mumuzinho)	Bruno Zicman	Giovana Diniz	Giovana Linhares	Hanny Kerhellyn	Hévelyn Medeiros	Luiza Gavazza
Claudia Leitte (& Mumuzinho)	Maria Alice Santana	Mari Lima	Matheus Freitas	Melissa Uehara	Pedro Ogata	Yisrael Fernando

== Blind auditions ==
Key

✔	Coach pressed "I WANT YOU" button
	Artist defaulted to a coach's team
	Artist picked a coach's team
	Artist eliminated with no coach pressing their "I WANT YOU" button

=== Episode 1 (Jan. 05) ===
Order	Artist	Age	Hometown	Song	Coach's and contestant's choices		
Order	Artist	Age	Hometown	Song	Brown	Simone & Simaria	Claudia
1	Vinne Ramos	9	Manaus	"Fui Fiel"	✔	✔	✔
2	Analu Sampaio	11	Vitória da Conquista	"Madalena"	✔	—	✔
3	Ana Júlia Poletto	12	Marau	"Jailhouse Rock"	✔	✔	✔
4	Loren Medeiros	11	Cruzeiro do Sul	"João e Maria"	✔	—	—
5	Maria Alice Santana	14	Congonhas	"Stone Cold"	✔	—	✔
6	Welcson Viegas	12	Vitória	"Mala"	—	✔	—
7	Julia Gomes	10	São Paulo	"Sorte Grande"	✔	—	—
8	Giovana Aguilera	13	Nova Friburgo	"Believer"	✔	✔	✔
9	Carol Lira	10	Sete Lagoas	"Peça Felicidade"	—	—	—
10	Pablo Paludo	12	Guatambu	"Saudade de Minha Terra"	✔	✔	—
11	Melissa Uehara	10	São Paulo	"Travessia"	—	—	✔
12	Kauê Penna	13	São João de Meriti	"Run to You"	✔	✔	✔

=== Episode 2 (Jan. 12) ===
Order	Artist	Age	Hometown	Song	Coach's and contestant's choices		
Order	Artist	Age	Hometown	Song	Brown	Simone & Simaria	Claudia
1	Luísa Martins	11	Taboão da Serra	"Azul da Cor do Mar"	✔	✔	✔
2	Manu Guimarães	9	Barroso	"Regime Fechado"	✔	✔	—
3	Bruno Zicman	13	São Paulo	"Stand by Me"	—	—	✔
4	Laura Nogueira	12	Goiânia	"É com Ela que Eu Estou"	—	—	—
5	Karen Silva	12	Volta Redonda	"Ginga"	✔	—	—
6	Duda de Paula	10	Rio de Janeiro	"Meu Abrigo"	✔	✔	✔
7	Milena Schmitz	10	Vera	"Anunciação"	✔	—	✔
8	Hévelyn Medeiros	13	Garuva	"Balada do Louco"	✔	✔	✔
9	Benício Abraão	14	Nova Cruz	"O Caderno"	✔	✔	✔
10	Duda Alves	10	Diadema	"Ainda Bem"	—	—	—
11	Brenda Gonçalves	11	Belford Roxo	"Pupila"	✔	—	—
12	Myrella Fernanda	9	Novo Horizonte do Norte	"Era Uma Vez"	✔	✔	✔

=== Episode 3 (Jan. 19) ===
Order	Artist	Age	Hometown	Song	Coach's and contestant's choices		
Order	Artist	Age	Hometown	Song	Brown	Simone & Simaria	Claudia
1	Pedro Ogata	14	São Paulo	"Chandelier"	✔	✔	✔
2	Turí	12	Rio Claro	"Dança da Solidão"	✔	✔	✔
3	Natielly Rocha	13	Inhuma	"Saudade"	✔	✔	—
4	Mari Lima	10	Rio de Janeiro	"Um Mundo Ideal"	✔	—	✔
5	Ana Carolina Julio	13	São Bernardo do Campo	"Um Anjo do Céu"	✔	—	—
6	Júlia Lima	10	Esperança	"Ai, que Saudade d'Ocê"	✔	✔	✔
7	Luiza Gavazza	10	Rio de Janeiro	"Valerie"	—	—	✔
8	Luank Dias	13	Brasília	"Perrengue"	—	✔	—
9	Brendha Namie	10	Caçapava	"Felicidade"	—	—	—
10	Artur Ortega	12	Porto Alegre	"É Preciso Saber Viver"	✔	—	✔
11	Marilia Tavares	13	Caracaraí	"Águas de Março"	✔	—	—
12	Davi Anderson	14	Alfenas	"I'll Be There"	✔	✔	✔

=== Episode 4 (Jan. 26) ===
Order	Artist	Age	Hometown	Song	Coach's and contestant's choices		
Order	Artist	Age	Hometown	Song	Brown	Simone & Simaria	Claudia
1	Lucas Mohallem	10	Belo Horizonte	"A Lenda"	✔	✔	✔
2	Giovana Costa	13	Bocaiuva	"Canarinho Prisioneiro"	✔	✔	✔
3	Laura Rodrigues	11	Brusque	"Confusão"	✔	—	—
4	Heloíse Camargo	12	Bagé	"Chegaste"	—	—	—
5	Maria Eduarda Ribeiro	14	Fraiburgo	"De Volta Pro Aconchego"	✔	✔	✔
6	Enzo Zakimi	14	São Paulo	"Conquistando o Impossível"	✔	✔	✔
7	Ana Clara Martins	13	São Paulo	"Million Reasons"	—	—	✔
8	Carol Breder	9	Nova Friburgo	"A Banda"	✔	—	✔
9	Arthur Galvani	12	Santo Antônio do Sudoeste	"Sonho de Ícaro"	✔	—	—
10	Henrique Moreno	13	Matão	"Deixa"	—	—	—
11	Anais Waucampt	12	Rio de Janeiro	"Final Feliz"	—	—	✔
12	Hellen Sandy	11	Teixeira de Freitas	"Tente Outra Vez"	✔	✔	✔

=== Episode 5 (Feb. 02) ===
Order	Artist	Age	Hometown	Song	Coach's and contestant's choices		
Order	Artist	Age	Hometown	Song	Brown	Simone & Simaria	Claudia
1	Laura Luna	13	Petrópolis	"I Put a Spell on You"	✔	✔	✔
2	Matheus Freitas	10	Peixoto de Azevedo	"Anjo (Angel)"	✔	—	✔
3	Giovanna de Luca	13	Lorena	"Assim que Se Faz"	✔	—	—
4	Giovanna Diniz	12	Ituiutaba	"Onde Anda Você"	✔	✔	✔
5	Ranon Fernandes	11	Vitória	"Apenas Mais Uma de Amor"	—	✔	—
6	Ana Luiza Salgueiro	13	Brasília	"The NeverEnding Story"	✔	—	—
7	Lívia Corrêa	10	Campos dos Goytacazes	"Photograph"	✔	✔	✔
8	Lívia Moschen	13	Caxias do Sul	"Como Eu Quero"	—	—	—
9	Pedro Lucas	10	Petrolina	"Na Hora de Amar"	✔	✔	—
10	Cybeli Cardoso	13	Paulo de Faria	"O Sol"	✔	✔	✔
11	Arthur Luz	11	Lauro de Freitas	"Radioactive"	✔	✔	✔

=== Episode 6 (Feb. 09) ===
Order	Artist	Age	Hometown	Song	Coach's and contestant's choices		
Order	Artist	Age	Hometown	Song	Brown	Simone & Simaria	Claudia
1	Guilherme Simões	12	Recife	"Canta Brasil"	✔	✔	✔
2	Letícia Prudêncio	11	Araranguá	"Além do Arco-íris"	✔	—	—
3	Venicios Melo	14	Ouro Branco	"Ciclo Sem Fim"	✔	✔	—
4	Mabê Neves	11	Santana de Parnaíba	"Eu Só Queria Te Amar"	✔	—	—
5	Victor Hugo Mendes	14	Goiânia	"Perfect"	✔	✔	✔
6	Giovanna Brilhante	11	Rio de Janeiro	"Fica"	✔	✔	✔
7	Sophia Marie	11	São Paulo	"Rolling in the Deep"	✔	✔	—
8	Arthur Tranjan	12	Rio de Janeiro	"Insensatez"	—	—	—
9	Adryel Freitas	12	Campo Novo do Parecis	"Cem Mil"	✔	—	✔
10	Milly Vitória	12	Salvador	"Sangrando"	—	✔	✔
11	Gaby Novais	11	Mogi das Cruzes	"A Menina Dança"	✔	—	—
12	Gusttavo Salles	14	Rio de Janeiro	"Agora (Ahora)"	✔	✔	✔

=== Episode 7 (Feb. 16) ===
Order	Artist	Age	Hometown	Song	Coach's and contestant's choices		
Order	Artist	Age	Hometown	Song	Brown	Simone & Simaria	Claudia
1	Felipinho	14	Taboão da Serra	"Coração do Maloqueiro"	✔	✔	✔
2	Alice Araújo	9	Barroso	"Erva Venenosa"	✔	—	✔
3	Yisrael Fernando	14	Rio Bonito	"When a Man Loves a Woman"	✔	✔	✔
4	Rayne Almeida	9	Ituaçu	"Folha Seca"	—	✔	—
5	Matheus Martins	12	Campo Grande	"Amor Distante"	✔	—	—
6	Giovanna Linhares	10	Rio de Janeiro	"Always Remember Us This Way"	—	—	✔
7	Vitor Henriques	12	Sapucaia do Sul	"Caça e Caçador"	—	—	—
8	Paulo Gomiz	14	São Paulo	"Beauty and The Beast"	✔	✔	✔
9	Hanny Kerhellyn	13	Nova Aurora	"Alô"	—	Team full	✔
10	Arthur Patta	11	Itaqui	"Não Deixe o Samba Morrer"	✔	Team full	Team full

== The Battles ==
Key

Artist won the Battle and advanced to the Live shows
Artist lost the Battle and was eliminated

Episode	Coach	Order	Winner	Song	Losers	
Episode 8 (February 23, 2020)	Claudia Leitte	1	Giovana Aguilera	"Rock and Roll"	Giovana Linhares	Hévelyn Medeiros
Episode 8 (February 23, 2020)	Simone & Simaria	2	Manu Guimarães	"Tijolinho por Tijolinho"	Ranon Fernandes	Rayne Almeida
Episode 8 (February 23, 2020)	Carlinhos Brown	3	Matheus Martins	"Louca de Saudade"	Arthur Galvani	Arthur Patta
Episode 8 (February 23, 2020)	Simone & Simaria	4	Natielly Rocha	"Dona de Mim"	Cybeli Cardoso	Laura Luna
Episode 8 (February 23, 2020)	Claudia Leitte	5	Duda de Paula	"Saber Quem Sou"	Luiza Gavazza	Mari Lima
Episode 8 (February 23, 2020)	Carlinhos Brown	6	Kauê Penna	"Pra Sempre Vou te Amar"	Giovanna de Luca	Milena Schmitz
Episode 9 (March 1, 2020)	Claudia Leitte	1	Victor Hugo Mendes	"In My Blood"	Maria Alice Santana	Pedro Ogata
Episode 9 (March 1, 2020)	Carlinhos Brown	2	Carol Breder	"Exagerado"	Letícia Prudêncio	Turí
Episode 9 (March 1, 2020)	Simone & Simaria	3	Milly Vitória	"Sabiá"	Giovana Costa	Júlia Lima
Episode 9 (March 1, 2020)	Claudia Leitte	4	Analu Sampaio	"Garota de Ipanema"	Anais Waucampt	Ana Júlia Poletto
Episode 9 (March 1, 2020)	Carlinhos Brown	5	Arthur Luz	"A Tal Canção Pra Lua"	Artur Ortega	Laura Rodrigues
Episode 9 (March 1, 2020)	Simone & Simaria	6	Felipinho	"Jogo do Amor"	Benício Abraão	Enzo Zakimi
Episode 10 (March 8, 2020)	Simone & Simaria	1	Gusttavo Salles	"A Hora É Agora"	Pablo Paludo	Welcson Viegas
Episode 10 (March 8, 2020)	Carlinhos Brown	2	Luísa Martins	"Do Seu Lado"	Alice Araújo	Gaby Novais
Episode 10 (March 8, 2020)	Claudia Leitte	3	Guilherme Simões	"She"	Bruno Zicman	Yisrael Fernando
Episode 10 (March 8, 2020)	Carlinhos Brown	4	Sophia Marie	"Girls Just Want to Have Fun"	Ana Luiza Salgueiro	Mabê Neves
Episode 10 (March 8, 2020)	Claudia Leitte	5	Maria Eduarda Ribeiro	"Samba de Verão"	Ana Clara Martins	Giovanna Diniz
Episode 10 (March 8, 2020)	Simone & Simaria	6	Vinne Ramos	"Meio Caminho Andado"	Luank Dias	Pedro Lucas
Episode 11 (March 15, 2020)	Simone & Simaria	1	Paulo Gomiz	"This Is Me"	Davi Anderson	Venícios Melo
Episode 11 (March 15, 2020)	Carlinhos Brown	2	Loren Medeiros	"Flagra"	Brenda Gonçalves	Marília Tavares
Episode 11 (March 15, 2020)	Claudia Leitte	3	Lívia Corrêa	"Brisa"	Hanny Kethellyn	Melissa Uehara
Episode 11 (March 15, 2020)	Simone & Simaria	4	Hellen Sandy	"Lua de Cristal"	Giovanna Brilhante	Myrella Fernanda
Episode 11 (March 15, 2020)	Carlinhos Brown	5	Karen Silva	"Menina Solta"	Ana Carolina Júlio	Júlia Gomes
Episode 11 (March 15, 2020)	Claudia Leitte	6	Lucas Mohallem	"Volta pra Mim"	Adryel Freitas	Matheus Freitas

== Live shows ==
After a six-month pause, the live shows were reimagined due to the COVID-19 pandemic in Brazil. The remaining contestants performed at home rather than in the auditorium.

=== Week 1: Showdown ===
Episode	Coach	Order	Artist	Song	Result
Episode 18 (September 20, 2020)
Episode 18 (September 20, 2020)	Simone & Simaria	1	Gusttavo Salles	"Vou Ter Que Superar"	Eliminated
Episode 18 (September 20, 2020)	Simone & Simaria	2	Hellen Sandy	"Desperdiçou"	Eliminated
Episode 18 (September 20, 2020)	Simone & Simaria	3	Manu Guimarães	"Serenata"	Coach's choice
Episode 18 (September 20, 2020)	Simone & Simaria	4	Paulo Gomiz	"Stay with Me"	Public's vote (35.15%)
Episode 18 (September 20, 2020)	Claudia Leitte (& Mumuzinho)	5	Analu Sampaio	"Upa Neguinho"	Public's vote (40.92%)
Episode 18 (September 20, 2020)	Claudia Leitte (& Mumuzinho)	6	Duda de Paula	"Mais Ninguém"	Eliminated
Episode 18 (September 20, 2020)	Claudia Leitte (& Mumuzinho)	7	Lívia Corrêa	"Onde Você Mora"	Eliminated
Episode 18 (September 20, 2020)	Claudia Leitte (& Mumuzinho)	8	Lucas Mohallem	"Set Fire to the Rain"	Coach's choice
Episode 18 (September 20, 2020)	Carlinhos Brown	9	Arthur Luz	"Tempos Modernos"	Eliminated
Episode 18 (September 20, 2020)	Carlinhos Brown	10	Carol Breder	"Assim Caminha A Humanidade"	Eliminated
Episode 18 (September 20, 2020)	Carlinhos Brown	11	Kauê Penna	"Listen"	Public's vote (50.31%)
Episode 18 (September 20, 2020)	Carlinhos Brown	12	Matheus Martins	"Estou Apaixonado (Estoy Enamorado)"	Coach's choice

=== Week 2: Showdown ===
Episode	Coach	Order	Artist	Song	Result
Episode 19 (September 27, 2020)
Episode 19 (September 27, 2020)	Claudia Leitte (& Mumuzinho)	1	Giovana Aguilera	"Jardins da Babilônia"	Public's vote (29.35%)
Episode 19 (September 27, 2020)	Claudia Leitte (& Mumuzinho)	2	Guilherme Simões	"Como É Grande O Meu Amor Por Você"	Eliminated
Episode 19 (September 27, 2020)	Claudia Leitte (& Mumuzinho)	3	Maria Eduarda Ribeiro	"Rise Up"	Coach's choice
Episode 19 (September 27, 2020)	Claudia Leitte (& Mumuzinho)	4	Victor Hugo Mendes	"Medo Bobo"	Eliminated
Episode 19 (September 27, 2020)	Carlinhos Brown	5	Karen Silva	"Meu Talismã"	Public's vote (34.84%)
Episode 19 (September 27, 2020)	Carlinhos Brown	6	Loren Medeiros	"Por Onde Andei"	Eliminated
Episode 19 (September 27, 2020)	Carlinhos Brown	7	Luísa Martins	"Who's Lovin' You"	Coach's choice
Episode 19 (September 27, 2020)	Carlinhos Brown	8	Sophia Marie	"Happy"	Eliminated
Episode 19 (September 27, 2020)	Simone & Simaria	9	Felipinho	"Amor de Verdade"	Public's vote (44.50%)
Episode 19 (September 27, 2020)	Simone & Simaria	10	Milly Vitória	"Esse Brilho É Meu"	Eliminated
Episode 19 (September 27, 2020)	Simone & Simaria	11	Natielly Rocha	"Girassol"	Eliminated
Episode 19 (September 27, 2020)	Simone & Simaria	12	Vinne Ramos	"Galopeira"	Coach's choice

=== Week 3: Semifinals ===
Episode	Coach	Order	Artist	Song	Result		
Episode	Coach	Order	Artist	Song	Public points	Coach points	Total points
Episode 20 (October 4, 2020)
Episode 20 (October 4, 2020)	Simone & Simaria	1	Felipinho	"Espaçoso Demais"	33.42	00.00	33.42
Episode 20 (October 4, 2020)	Simone & Simaria	2	Manu Guimarães	"Pisadinha"	12.11	00.00	12.11
Episode 20 (October 4, 2020)	Simone & Simaria	3	Paulo Gomiz	"Talking to the Moon"	22.99	20.00	42.99
Episode 20 (October 4, 2020)	Simone & Simaria	4	Vinne Ramos	"Pense em Mim"	31.48	00.00	31.48
Episode 20 (October 4, 2020)	Carlinhos Brown	5	Karen Silva	"Spirit"	15.18	00.00	15.18
Episode 20 (October 4, 2020)	Carlinhos Brown	6	Kauê Penna	"Didn't We Almost Have It All"	61.50	20.00	81.50
Episode 20 (October 4, 2020)	Carlinhos Brown	7	Luísa Martins	"Primavera"	10.86	00.00	10.86
Episode 20 (October 4, 2020)	Carlinhos Brown	8	Matheus Martins	"Péssimo Negócio"	12.46	00.00	12.46
Episode 20 (October 4, 2020)	Claudia Leitte (& Mumuzinho)	9	Analu Sampaio	"Vou Deitar e Rolar"	38.97	00.00	38.97
Episode 20 (October 4, 2020)	Claudia Leitte (& Mumuzinho)	10	Giovana Aguilera	"Cryin'"	28.64	00.00	28.64
Episode 20 (October 4, 2020)	Claudia Leitte (& Mumuzinho)	11	Lucas Mohallem	"A Paz / Heal the World"	08.96	00.00	08.96
Episode 20 (October 4, 2020)	Claudia Leitte (& Mumuzinho)	12	Maria Eduarda Ribeiro	"Fim de Tarde"	23.43	20.00	43.43

=== Week 4: Finals ===
Episode	Coach	Artist	Order	Song	Order	Duet with Coach	Order	Song	Result
Episode 21 (October 11, 2020)
Episode 21 (October 11, 2020)	Carlinhos Brown	Kauê Penna	1	"Nada Mais (Lately)"	5	"Saúde"	7	"Pra Sempre Vou Te Amar"	Winner (50.50%)
Episode 21 (October 11, 2020)	Claudia Leitte (& Mumuzinho)	Maria Eduarda Ribeiro	2	"Coleção"	4	"Sina"	8	"De Volta Pro Aconchego"	Runner-up
Episode 21 (October 11, 2020)	Simone & Simaria	Paulo Gomiz	3	"Blinding Lights"	6	"Raspão"	9	"Beauty and the Beast"	Runner-up

== Elimination chart ==
Artist's info

- Team Brown
- Team Simone & Simaria
- Team Claudia (& Mumuzinho)

Result details

- Winner
- Runner-up
- Saved by the public
- Saved by the coach
- Advanced to the final
- Eliminated

Live show results per week
Artist	Week 1	Week 2	Week 3	Week 4
Kauê Penna	Safe		Advanced	Winner
Maria Eduarda Ribeiro		Safe	Advanced	Runner-up
Paulo Gomiz	Safe		Advanced	Runner-up
Analu Sampaio	Safe		Eliminated	Eliminated (week 3)
Felipinho		Safe	Eliminated	Eliminated (week 3)
Giovana Aguilera		Safe	Eliminated	Eliminated (week 3)
Karen Silva		Safe	Eliminated	Eliminated (week 3)
Lucas Mohallem	Safe		Eliminated	Eliminated (week 3)
Luísa Martins		Safe	Eliminated	Eliminated (week 3)
Manu Guimarães	Safe		Eliminated	Eliminated (week 3)
Matheus Martins	Safe		Eliminated	Eliminated (week 3)
Vinne Ramos		Safe	Eliminated	Eliminated (week 3)
Guilherme Simões		Eliminated	Eliminated (week 2)	
Loren Medeiros		Eliminated	Eliminated (week 2)	
Milly Vitória		Eliminated	Eliminated (week 2)	
Natielly Rocha		Eliminated	Eliminated (week 2)	
Sophia Marie		Eliminated	Eliminated (week 2)	
Victor Hugo Mendes		Eliminated	Eliminated (week 2)	
Arthur Luz	Eliminated	Eliminated (week 1)		
Carol Breder	Eliminated	Eliminated (week 1)		
Duda de Paula	Eliminated	Eliminated (week 1)		
Gusttavo Salles	Eliminated	Eliminated (week 1)		
Hellen Sandy	Eliminated	Eliminated (week 1)		
Lívia Corrêa	Eliminated	Eliminated (week 1)		

== Ratings and reception ==
=== Brazilian ratings ===
All numbers are in points and provided by Kantar Ibope Media.

Episode	Title	Air date	Timeslot (BRT)	SP viewers (in points)	Source
1	The Blind Auditions 1	January 5, 2020	Sunday 1:00 p.m.	14.2	
2	The Blind Auditions 2	January 12, 2020	Sunday 1:00 p.m.	14.5	
3	The Blind Auditions 3	January 19, 2020	Sunday 1:00 p.m.	13.4	
4	The Blind Auditions 4	January 26, 2020	Sunday 1:00 p.m.	13.0	
5	The Blind Auditions 5	February 2, 2020	Sunday 1:00 p.m.	12.8	
6	The Blind Auditions 6	February 9, 2020	Sunday 1:00 p.m.	13.0	
7	The Blind Auditions 7	February 16, 2020	Sunday 1:00 p.m.	14.2	
8	The Battles 1	February 23, 2020	Sunday 1:00 p.m.	15.1	
9	The Battles 2	March 1, 2020	Sunday 1:00 p.m.	12.8	
10	The Battles 3	March 8, 2020	Sunday 1:00 p.m.	12.8	
11	The Battles 4	March 15, 2020	Sunday 1:00 p.m.	15.1	
12	Season Recap 1	March 22, 2020	Sunday 1:00 p.m.	15.1	
13	Season Recap 2	March 29, 2020	Sunday 1:00 p.m.	13.3	
14	Season Recap 3	April 5, 2020	Sunday 1:00 p.m.	11.0	
15	Season Recap 4	April 12, 2020	Sunday 1:00 p.m.	10.8	
16	Season Recap 5	April 19, 2020	Sunday 1:00 p.m.	10.7	
17	Special Episode	September 13, 2020	Sunday 1:00 p.m.	12.6	
18	Showdown 1	September 20, 2020	Sunday 1:00 p.m.	10.7	
19	Showdown 2	September 27, 2020	Sunday 1:00 p.m.	09.6	
20	Semifinals	October 4, 2020	Sunday 1:00 p.m.	10.7	
21	Finals	October 11, 2020	Sunday 1:00 p.m.	09.3	

- In 2020, each point represents 254.892 households in 15 market cities in Brazil (73.015 households in São Paulo).
