= The Voice Kids (Brazilian TV series) season 1 =

The Voice Kids
- Season 1
- Hosted by: Tiago Leifert
- Coaches: Carlinhos Brown; Ivete Sangalo; Victor & Leo
- Winner: Wagner Barreto

Release
- Original network: Rede Globo
- Original release: January 3 – March 27, 2016

The first season of The Voice Kids, a Brazilian televised singing competition, premiered on January 3, 2016, on Rede Globo in the 2:00 / 1:00 p.m. (BRST / AMT) daytime slot.

The coaches were revealed in October 2015 to be: Brazilian axé singer Ivete Sangalo, MPB singer-songwriter Carlinhos Brown, and sertanejo duo Victor & Leo. Tiago Leifert is a host of the show and Kika Martinez served as backstage interviewer.

== Teams ==
Key

- Winner
- Runner-up
- Eliminated in the Live shows
- Eliminated in the Battle rounds

Coaches	Top 72 artists					
Victor & Leo						
Victor & Leo	Wagner Barreto	Ana Beatriz Torres	Enzo & Eder	Laura Schadeck	Ana Pieri	Ana Rosa
Victor & Leo	Leslie & Laurie	Mayara Cavalcante	Abgail Barcelos	Ally Victory	Cairo Henrique	Elizaldo Alves
Victor & Leo	Gabriel Lins	Gigi Fonseca	Ikaro & Rodrigo	Isadora Porto	Jamille Silva	João Vitor
Victor & Leo	Juan Luca	Júlia Ferreira	Letícia Roennau	Mariana Rocha	Pepê Santos	Vitória Lopes
Ivete Sangalo						
Ivete Sangalo	Pérola Crepaldi	Daniel Henrique	Luna Bandeira	Robert Lucas	Carol Passos	Julie de Assis
Ivete Sangalo	Luiza Prochet	Nicole Luz	Bebé Salvego	Bell Lins	Giulia Nassa	Kailane Frauches
Ivete Sangalo	Larissa Carvalho	Luiza Haggsträm	Luna Maria	Madu Alvarenga	Manu Paiva	Marina Silveira
Ivete Sangalo	Matheus Quirino	Nathy Veras	Roberto Matheus	Steffany Laura	Tabatha Almeida	Vicky Valentim
Carlinhos Brown						
Carlinhos Brown	Rafa Gomes	Felipe Adetokunbo	Íris Pereira	Ryandro Campos	Bela Maria	Júlia Gomes
Carlinhos Brown	Malu Cavalcanti	Mari Cardoso	Andréa Vitória	Catarina Estralioto	Clara Lima	Gabb Lippert
Carlinhos Brown	Gabriel Gava	Igor Silveira	João Pedro Borges	Kaliny Rodrigues	Laís Amaro	Lia Gomes
Carlinhos Brown	Lorena & Rafaela	Lou Garcia	Luisa Costa	Mª Fernanda da Costa	Tavinho Leoni	Thaynã Lima

== Blind auditions ==
Key

✔	Coach pressed "I WANT YOU" button
	Artist defaulted to a coach's team
	Artist picked a coach's team
	Artist eliminated with no coach pressing their "I WANT YOU" button

=== Episode 1 (Jan. 3) ===
Order	Artist	Age	Hometown	Song	Coach's and contestant's choices		
Order	Artist	Age	Hometown	Song	Victor & Leo	Ivete	Brown
1	Felipe Adetokunbo	15	Rio de Janeiro	"At Last"	✔	✔	✔
2	Ana Rosa	13	Sinop	"Eu Só Queria Te Amar"	✔	✔	✔
3	Giulia Nassa	12	São Paulo	"Out Here on My Own"	—	✔	✔
4	Sofia Ferreira	13	Brasília	"Desculpe o Auê"	—	—	—
5	Luna Bandeira	10	Rio de Janeiro	"I'll Be There"	✔	✔	✔
6	Rafa Gomes	10	Curitiba	"História de Uma Gata"	✔	—	✔
7	Julie de Assis	12	Salvador	"Retrato da Vida"	✔	✔	✔
8	Mª Fernanda da Costa	9	Porto Alegre	"Xote das Meninas"	—	—	✔
9	Ana Beatriz Torres	10	Goiânia	"A Vizinha do Lado"	✔	—	—
10	Igor Silveira	9	Conselheiro Lafaiete	"Corazón Espinado"	✔	—	✔
11	Letícia Roennau	13	Taquara	"Sorri, Sou Rei"	✔	—	—
12	João Pedro Borges	11	Aracaju	"The Show Must Go On"	—	✔	✔
13	Fabiana Gomes	13	Inhumas	"Mudando de Assunto"	—	—	—

=== Episode 2 (Jan. 10) ===
Order	Artist	Age	Hometown	Song	Coach's and contestant's choices		
Order	Artist	Age	Hometown	Song	Victor & Leo	Ivete	Brown
1	Enzo & Éder	12–10	Presidente Epitácio	"O Menino da Porteira"	✔	✔	✔
2	Lia Gomes	14	Lauro de Freitas	"Dona Cila"	✔	✔	✔
3	Pérola Crepaldi	11	Apucarana	"Memory"	✔	✔	✔
4	Wagner Barreto	15	Porto Rico	"Índia"	✔	✔	✔
5	Kaliny Rodrigues	11	Campo Verde	"Mira Ira"	—	—	✔
6	Laura Schadek	12	Santo Angelo	"Burn"	✔	—	—
7	Madu Alvarenga	13	Belo Horizonte	"Simples Desejo"	✔	✔	✔
8	Tabatha Almeida	14	Recife	"Dear Future Husband"	—	✔	✔
9	Marcos Tybel	13	Pinheiros	"Você Não Me Conhece"	—	—	—
10	Bell Lins	15	Brasília	"Jack Soul Brasileiro"	✔	✔	✔
11	Lucas Marques	13	Salvador	"A Sua Maneira"	—	—	—
12	Matheus Quirino	13	Sete Lagoas	"No Dia Em Que Eu Saí de Casa"	—	✔	—
13	Íris Pereira	9	Santa Luzia	"Felicidade"	✔	✔	✔
14	Manuela Andrade	14	Fortaleza	"Se Tudo Fosse Fácil"	—	—	—
15	Gabriel Gava	12	Niterói	"Dois Rios"	✔	—	✔

=== Episode 3 (Jan. 17) ===
Order	Artist	Age	Hometown	Song	Coach's and contestant's choices		
Order	Artist	Age	Hometown	Song	Victor & Leo	Ivete	Brown
1	Ryandro Campos	13	Porciúncula	"Fim de Tarde"	✔	✔	✔
2	Luiza Prochet	12	Rio de Janeiro	"Your Song"	✔	✔	✔
3	Leslie & Laurie	14–11	Coronel Fabriciano	"Seio de Minas"	✔	—	✔
4	Gabriel Marks	15	Manaus	"Um Dia"	—	—	—
5	Bebé Salvego	12	Piracicaba	"I Can't Give You Anything But Love"	✔	✔	✔
6	Gabriel Lins	12	Sapucaia do Sul	"Escreve Aí"	✔	✔	✔
7	Malu Cavalcanti	11	Ubiratã	"Você Sempre Será"	✔	—	✔
8	Kailane Frauches	11	Duque de Caxias	"Olha o que o Amor Me Faz"	✔	✔	✔
9	Thaynã Lima	13	Itapetininga	"Um Dia de Domingo"	—	—	✔
10	Duda Balestero	14	São Paulo	Crazy"	—	—	—
11	Marina Silveira	11	João Pessoa	"We Remain"	—	✔	✔
12	Mayara Cavalcante	12	Belém	"Por Enquanto"	✔	—	—
13	Elizaldo Alves	13	São Vicente	"Domingo de Manhã"	✔	—	—
14	Laís Amaro	10	Cajazeiras	"Qui Nem Jiló"	—	—	✔

=== Episode 4 (Jan. 24) ===
Order	Artist	Age	Hometown	Song	Coach's and contestant's choices		
Order	Artist	Age	Hometown	Song	Victor & Leo	Ivete	Brown
1	Larissa Carvalho	11	Belo Horizonte	"Almost is Never Enough"	—	✔	—
2	Manu Paiva	14	Cuiabá	"Who's Loving You"	✔	✔	✔
3	Cairo Henrique	13	Rondonópolis	"Tudo Que Você Quiser"	✔	—	—
4	Nathan Estraes	14	São Leopoldo	"Do Seu Lado"	—	—	—
5	Júlia Ferreira	11	Campos dos Goytacazes	"Cicatriz"	✔	—	—
6	Bela Maria	14	Paulista	"Não Vá Embora"	—	✔	✔
7	Abgail Barcelos	15	Contagem	"Insano"	✔	—	—
8	Júlia Saad	10	Formosa	"Pra Você"	—	—	—
9	Nathy Veras	15	Rio de Janeiro	"Back to Black"	—	✔	—
10	Ikaro & Rodrigo	14–15	Sertãozinho	"Linda Juventude"	✔	—	✔
11	Gigi Fonseca	11	Juiz de Fora	"Do Lado de Cá"	✔	—	—
12	Júlia Gomes	13	São Paulo	"Listen"	✔	✔	✔
13	João Vitor	15	Cachoeirinha	"Que Sorte a Nossa"	✔	—	✔
14	Andréa Vitória	14	Petrolina	"Rosa"	—	—	✔

=== Episode 5 (Jan. 31) ===
Order	Artist	Age	Hometown	Song	Coach's and contestant's choices		
Order	Artist	Age	Hometown	Song	Victor & Leo	Ivete	Brown
1	Luiza Haggsträm	11	Porto Alegre	"Over the Rainbow"	—	✔	✔
2	Pepê Santos	14	Belo Horizonte	"Um Degrau Na Escada"	✔	—	✔
3	Tavinho Leoni	12	Belo Horizonte	"A Voz do Morro"	—	—	✔
4	Amanda Lyra	14	João Pessoa	"Eu Sei"	—	—	—
5	Isadora Porto	15	Florianópolis	"As Canções Que Você Fez Pra Mim"	✔	—	—
6	Mari Cardoso	11	Rio de Janeiro	"Agora Só Falta Você"	✔	✔	✔
7	Ally Victory	15	Recife	"Stone Cold"	✔	—	—
8	Steffany Laura	14	São Miguel do Guamá	"Primavera"	✔	✔	✔
9	Ellen Clicia	13	Porto Velho	"Mais Ninguém"	—	—	—
10	Carol Passos	13	Curitiba	"Pride and Joy"	✔	✔	✔
11	Vitória Lopes	15	Arraial do Cabo	"Mais Uma Vez"	✔	—	—
12	Luisa Costa	12	Brasília	"Fly Me to the Moon"	✔	✔	✔
13	Vicky Valentim	15	Volta Redonda	"Beautiful"	—	✔	✔
14	Roberto Matheus	13	Fortaleza	"Cê Que Sabe"	—	✔	✔

=== Episode 6 (Feb. 7) ===
Order	Artist	Age	Hometown	Song	Coach's and contestant's choices		
Order	Artist	Age	Hometown	Song	Victor & Leo	Ivete	Brown
1	Nicole Luz	13	Sobradinho	"That's What Friends Are For"	✔	✔	✔
2	Gisele Arruda	15	Fortaleza	"Frio"	—	—	—
3	Ana Pieri	12	Florianópolis	"Malandragem"	✔	—	—
4	Lou Garcia	15	Salvador	"Stand by Me"	✔	—	✔
5	Luna Maria	13	Santa Bárbara d' Oeste	"Coleção"	—	✔	✔
6	Juan Luca	14	Bambuí	"Uma Louca Tempestade"	✔	—	—
7	Daniel Henrique	14	Rio de Janeiro	"Far Away"	—	✔	—
8	Clara Lima	15	Pomerode	"As Rosas Não Falam"	✔	—	✔
9	Júlia Barrak	12	São Paulo	"Royals"	—	—	—
10	Catarina Estralioto	13	Arapongas	"O Bêbado e a Equilibrista"	—	—	✔
11	Mariana Rocha	14	Recife	"Man in the Mirror"	✔	—	—
12	Lorena & Rafaela	15–14	Romaria	"Sinônimos"	—	—	✔
13	Robert Lucas	14	Valença	"When I Was Your Man"	✔	✔	✔
14	Jamille Silva	11	Riachão do Jacuípe	"Let It Go"	✔	Team full	—
15	Leo Souzza	13	Parapuã	"Borboletas"	Team full	Team full	—
16	Gabb Lippert	15	Arroio do Sal	"Admirável Chip Novo"	Team full	Team full	✔

== The Battles ==
Key

Artist won the Battle and advanced to the Live shows
Artist lost the Battle and was eliminated

Episode	Coach	Order	Winner	Song	Losers	
Episode 7 (February 14)	Ivete Sangalo	1	Nicole Luz	"Come Together" / "Dear Prudence"	Bell Lins	Steffany Laura
Episode 7 (February 14)	Carlinhos Brown	2	Felipe Adetokunbo	"O Descobridor dos Sete Mares"	Gabb Lippert	Tavinho Leoni
Episode 7 (February 14)	Victor & Leo	3	Ana Beatriz Torres	"A Noite"	Gigi Fonseca	Letícia Roennau
Episode 7 (February 14)	Carlinhos Brown	4	Júlia Gomes	"Love on Top"	Andréa Vitória	Lou Garcia
Episode 7 (February 14)	Victor & Leo	5	Ana Rosa	"Amor Pra Recomeçar"	Gabriel Lins	João Vitor
Episode 7 (February 14)	Ivete Sangalo	6	Pérola Crepaldi	"Em Cada Sonho"	Giulia Nassa	Luiza Haggsträm
Episode 7 (February 14)	Victor & Leo	7	Wagner Barreto	"Desculpe, Mas Eu Vou Chorar"	Ikaro & Rodrigo	Pepê Santos
Episode 7 (February 14)	Carlinhos Brown	8	Rafa Gomes	"Superfantástico"	Igor Silveira	Kaliny Rodrigues
Episode 8 (February 21)	Victor & Leo	1	Enzo & Éder	"É o Amor"	Cairo Henrique	Vitória Lopes
Episode 8 (February 21)	Ivete Sangalo	2	Robert Lucas	"Quando a Chuva Passar"	Kailane Frauches	Matheus Quirino
Episode 8 (February 21)	Carlinhos Brown	3	Bela Maria	"Halo"	Luisa Costa	Thaynã Lima
Episode 8 (February 21)	Carlinhos Brown	4	Ryandro Campos	"Vou Deixar"	Gabriel Gava	João Pedro Borges
Episode 8 (February 21)	Victor & Leo	5	Ana Pieri	"Além do Horizonte"	Abgail Barcelos	Isadora Porto
Episode 8 (February 21)	Ivete Sangalo	6	Carol Passos	"I Can't Stop Loving You"	Bebé Salvego	Nathy Veras
Episode 8 (February 21)	Carlinhos Brown	7	Malu Cavalcanti	"Na Estrada"	Clara Lima	Lia Gomes
Episode 8 (February 21)	Ivete Sangalo	8	Luna Bandeira	"Don't Stop the Music"	Larissa Carvalho	Vicky Valentim
Episode 9 (February 28)	Ivete Sangalo	1	Luiza Prochet	"Drão"	Luna Maria	Tabatha Almeida
Episode 9 (February 28)	Carlinhos Brown	2	Íris Pereira	"Quando Você Passa"	Laís Amaro	Mª Fernanda da Costa
Episode 9 (February 28)	Victor & Leo	3	Mayara Cavalcante	"Like I'm Gonna Lose You"	Ally Victory	Mariana Rocha
Episode 9 (February 28)	Victor & Leo	4	Leslie & Laurie	"Na Linha do Tempo"	Elizaldo Alves	Juan Luca
Episode 9 (February 28)	Ivete Sangalo	5	Daniel Henrique	"Say Something"	Madu Alvarenga	Manú Paiva
Episode 9 (February 28)	Carlinhos Brown	6	Mari Cardoso	"Baila Comigo"	Catarina Estralioto	Lorena & Rafaela
Episode 9 (February 28)	Ivete Sangalo	7	Julie de Assis	"Lamento Sertanejo"	Marina Silveira	Roberto Matheus
Episode 9 (February 28)	Victor & Leo	8	Laura Schadeck	"Blank Space"	Jamille Silva	Júlia Ferreira

== Live shows ==
=== Elimination chart ===
Artist's info

- Artist from Team Victor & Leo
- Artist from Team Ivete
- Artist from Team Brown

Result details

- Artist was the winner
- Artist was runner-up
- Artist advanced on public's votes
- Artist was saved by coach
- Artist advanced to the final
- Artist was eliminated

Live show results per week
Artist	Week 1	Week 2	Week 3	Week 4
Wagner Barreto		Safe	Advanced	Winner
Pérola Crepaldi	Safe		Advanced	Runner-up
Rafa Gomes		Safe	Advanced	Runner-up
Ana Beatriz Torres		Safe	Eliminated	Eliminated (week 3)
Daniel Henrique	Safe		Eliminated	Eliminated (week 3)
Enzo & Éder	Safe		Eliminated	Eliminated (week 3)
Felipe Adetokunbo	Safe		Eliminated	Eliminated (week 3)
Íris Pereira	Safe		Eliminated	Eliminated (week 3)
Laura Schadeck	Safe		Eliminated	Eliminated (week 3)
Luna Bandeira		Safe	Eliminated	Eliminated (week 3)
Robert Lucas		Safe	Eliminated	Eliminated (week 3)
Ryandro Campos		Safe	Eliminated	Eliminated (week 3)
Bela Maria		Eliminated	Eliminated (week 2)	
Julie de Assis		Eliminated	Eliminated (week 2)	
Leslie & Laurie		Eliminated	Eliminated (week 2)	
Luiza Prochet		Eliminated	Eliminated (week 2)	
Mari Cardoso		Eliminated	Eliminated (week 2)	
Mayara Cavalcante		Eliminated	Eliminated (week 2)	
Ana Pieri	Eliminated	Eliminated (week 1)		
Ana Rosa	Eliminated	Eliminated (week 1)		
Carol Passos	Eliminated	Eliminated (week 1)		
Júlia Gomes	Eliminated	Eliminated (week 1)		
Malu Cavalcanti	Eliminated	Eliminated (week 1)		
Nicole Luz	Eliminated	Eliminated (week 1)		

=== Week 1 ===
==== Quarterfinals 1 ====
Episode	Coach	Order	Artist	Song	Result
Episode 10 (March 6)
Episode 10 (March 6)	Ivete Sangalo	1	Carol Passos	"Ovelha Negra"	Eliminated
Episode 10 (March 6)	Ivete Sangalo	2	Daniel Henrique	"Cedo ou Tarde"	Public's vote (29%)
Episode 10 (March 6)	Ivete Sangalo	3	Nicole Luz	"Soul de Verão"	Eliminated
Episode 10 (March 6)	Ivete Sangalo	4	Pérola Crepaldi	"Beauty and the Beast"	Coach's choice
Episode 10 (March 6)	Victor & Leo	5	Ana Pieri	"Quem de Nós Dois"	Eliminated
Episode 10 (March 6)	Victor & Leo	6	Ana Rosa	"Nada Sei"	Eliminated
Episode 10 (March 6)	Victor & Leo	7	Enzo & Éder	"Fogão de Lenha"	Public's vote (44%)
Episode 10 (March 6)	Victor & Leo	8	Laura Schadeck	"A Thousand Years"	Coach's choice
Episode 10 (March 6)	Carlinhos Brown	9	Felipe Adetokunbo	"Isn't She Lovely"	Coach's choice
Episode 10 (March 6)	Carlinhos Brown	10	Íris Pereira	"Mercy"	Public's vote (40%)
Episode 10 (March 6)	Carlinhos Brown	11	Júlia Gomes	"A Lenda"	Eliminated
Episode 10 (March 6)	Carlinhos Brown	12	Malu Cavalcanti	"Eu Não Vou"	Eliminated

=== Week 2 ===
==== Quarterfinals 2 ====
Episode	Coach	Order	Artist	Song	Result
Episode 11 (March 13)
Episode 11 (March 13)	Victor & Leo	1	Ana Beatriz Torres	"Fico Assim Sem Você"	Coach's choice
Episode 11 (March 13)	Victor & Leo	2	Leslie & Laurie	"Logo Eu"	Eliminated
Episode 11 (March 13)	Victor & Leo	3	Mayara Cavalcante	"Lost Stars"	Eliminated
Episode 11 (March 13)	Victor & Leo	4	Wagner Barreto	"Romaria"	Public's vote (39%)
Episode 11 (March 13)	Ivete Sangalo	5	Julie de Assis	"Bate Coração"	Eliminated
Episode 11 (March 13)	Ivete Sangalo	6	Luiza Prochet	"Eu Sei Que Vou Te Amar"	Eliminated
Episode 11 (March 13)	Ivete Sangalo	7	Luna Bandeira	"Break Free"	Coach's choice
Episode 11 (March 13)	Ivete Sangalo	8	Robert Lucas	"Flashlight"	Public's vote (40%)
Episode 11 (March 13)	Carlinhos Brown	9	Bela Maria	"Velha Infância"	Eliminated
Episode 11 (March 13)	Carlinhos Brown	10	Mari Cardoso	"Como Nossos Pais"	Eliminated
Episode 11 (March 13)	Carlinhos Brown	11	Rafa Gomes	"O Caderno"	Public's vote (50%)
Episode 11 (March 13)	Carlinhos Brown	12	Ryandro Campos	"Seduzir"	Coach's choice

=== Week 3 ===
==== Semifinals ====
Episode	Coach	Order	Artist	Song	Result		
Episode	Coach	Order	Artist	Song	Public points	Coach points	Total points
Episode 12 (March 20)
Episode 12 (March 20)	Ivete Sangalo	1	Daniel Henrique	"Sem Radar"	19	00	19
Episode 12 (March 20)	Ivete Sangalo	2	Luna Bandeira	"Um Certo Alguém"	20	00	20
Episode 12 (March 20)	Ivete Sangalo	3	Pérola Crepaldi	"Brincar de Viver"	27	30	57
Episode 12 (March 20)	Ivete Sangalo	4	Robert Lucas	"Só Chamei Porque Te Amo"	34	00	34
Episode 12 (March 20)	Victor & Leo	5	Ana Beatriz Torres	"Casinha Branca"	11	00	11
Episode 12 (March 20)	Victor & Leo	6	Enzo & Éder	"Saudade da Minha Terra"	21	00	21
Episode 12 (March 20)	Victor & Leo	7	Laura Schadeck	"Heart Attack"	21	00	21
Episode 12 (March 20)	Victor & Leo	8	Wagner Barreto	"Todo Azul do Mar"	47	30	77
Episode 12 (March 20)	Carlinhos Brown	9	Felipe Adetokunbo	"What's Going On"	10	00	10
Episode 12 (March 20)	Carlinhos Brown	10	Íris Pereira	"Não é Proibido"	19	00	19
Episode 12 (March 20)	Carlinhos Brown	11	Rafa Gomes	"Banho de Lua"	49	30	79
Episode 12 (March 20)	Carlinhos Brown	12	Ryandro Campos	"Caça e Caçador"	22	00	22

=== Week 4 ===
==== Finals ====
Episode	Coach	Artist	Order	Song	Order	Duet with Coach	Result
Episode 13 (March 27)
Episode 13 (March 27)	Victor & Leo	Wagner Barreto	1	"Disparada"	5	"Tem Que Ser Você"	Winner (66%)
Episode 13 (March 27)	Carlinhos Brown	Rafa Gomes	6	"Sítio do Picapau Amarelo"	2	"É Tão Lindo"	Runner-up
Episode 13 (March 27)	Ivete Sangalo	Pérola Crepaldi	3	"Se Eu Não Te Amasse Tanto Assim"	4	"Festa"	Runner-up
