= The Voice Kids (Brazilian TV series) season 7 =

The Voice Kids
- Season 7
- Hosted by: Márcio Garcia; Thalita Rebouças
- Coaches: Carlinhos Brown; Maiara & Maraisa; Michel Teló; Toni Garrido (guest)
- No. of contestants: 63 artists
- Winner: Isis Testa
- Winning coach: Maiara & Maraisa
- Runners-up: Mel Grebin; Isadora Pedrini
- No. of episodes: 12

Release
- Original network: TV Globo; Multishow
- Original release: May 1 – July 17, 2022

Season chronology
- ← Previous; Season 6 Next → Season 8

The seventh season of The Voice Kids premiered on TV Globo on May 1, 2022 in the 2:30 / 1:30 p.m. (BRT / AMT) daytime slot.

Carlinhos Brown and Michel Teló returned for their seventh and second season as coaches, respectively, while Gaby Amarantos was replaced by sisters Maiara & Maraisa.

Michel Teló tested positive for COVID-19 prior to the taping of the Showdowns episodes on May 28–29. As result, it was announced that his team would be coached by singer Toni Garrido instead, with Teló returning as coach for the Live shows.

On July 17, 2022, Isis Testa from Team Maiara & Maraisa won the competition with 43.65% of the final vote over Isadora Pedrini (Team Brown) and Mel Grebin (Team Teló). It was the first and only season to feature an all-female final three.

== Teams ==
Key

Winner
Runner-up

Eliminated in the Semifinals
Eliminated in the Showdowns

Eliminated in the Battles
Disqualified

Coaches	Top 63 artists					
Carlinhos Brown						
Carlinhos Brown	Isadora Pedrini	Arthur Marçal	Artur de Mari	Bielzinho	Francine Maria	Letícia Araújo
Carlinhos Brown	Nanda Santiago	Karin Barros	Isabela Moreno	Bia Klappoth	Duda Sena	Gabi Sorroce
Carlinhos Brown	BÊ	João Felipe Bistene	Heitor Gusmão	Carol Brasil	Beca	Sara Antonybele
Carlinhos Brown	Duda Lobo	Jolie	Giovanna Barbiero			
Maiara & Maraisa						
Maiara & Maraisa	Isis Testa	Débora Azevedo	Kaio Álvaro	Amora	Leonardo Freire	Lorenah
Maiara & Maraisa	Maria Laura	Vitória Heck	Laís Paixão	Yves Maria	Igor Valença	Mateus Cassemiro
Maiara & Maraisa	Luís Miguel	Isadora Benites	Cecilia Amorim	Tavinho Porto Rico	Pedro Henrique	Fernanda Lopes
Maiara & Maraisa	Emily Teixeira	Alice Cardoso	Letty			
Michel Teló						
Michel Teló	Mel Grebin	Rafa Lemos	Sávio & Gustavo	Bianca Guterres	Davi Andrade	Esther Jullya Carvalho
Michel Teló	Julia Castro	Gabriela Muniz	Julia Almeida	Bernardo Yuri	Diego Marques	Manu Anjos
Michel Teló	Ana Felps	Esther Samuel	Alannah Schuu	Lorena Araújo	Antonio Marques	Giulia Foganholli
Michel Teló	Miguel Ruas	Fernandinha	Iris Mantovani			

== Blind auditions ==
Key

✔	Coach pressed "I WANT YOU" button
	Artist defaulted to a coach's team
	Artist picked a coach's team
	Artist eliminated with no coach pressing their "I WANT YOU" button

Episode	Order	Artist	Age	Hometown	Song	Coach's and contestant's choices		
Episode	Order	Artist	Age	Hometown	Song	Brown	Maiara & Maraisa	Teló
Episode 1 (May 1, 2022)	1	Isadora Pedrini	9	Curitiba	"Pesadão"	✔	✔	✔
Episode 1 (May 1, 2022)	2	Mateus Cassemiro	14	Sorriso	"Falando às Paredes"	✔	✔	✔
Episode 1 (May 1, 2022)	3	Íris Mantovani	10	Maringá	"Who's Loving You"	✔	–	✔
Episode 1 (May 1, 2022)	4	Cecília Amorim	14	Limoeiro do Norte	"Lamento Sertanejo"	✔	✔	✔
Episode 1 (May 1, 2022)	5	Arthur Marçal	13	Cruzeiro do Sul	"Nessun dorma (Turandot)"	✔	✔	✔
Episode 1 (May 1, 2022)	6	Gabi Sorroce	14	Valinhos	"The Girl from Ipanema (Garota de Ipanema)"	✔	✔	✔
Episode 1 (May 1, 2022)	7	Fernandinha	10	Ipiaú	"Someone like You"	✔	–	✔
Episode 1 (May 1, 2022)	8	Justini LP	14	Espumoso	"Eu Sou Egoísta"	–	–	–
Episode 1 (May 1, 2022)	9	Luís Miguel	13	Cabo Frio	"Será Que Foi Saudade?"	✔	✔	✔
Episode 1 (May 1, 2022)	10	Bielzinho	9	Catalão	"Uni Duni Tê"	✔	–	–
Episode 1 (May 1, 2022)	11	Gabriela Muniz	12	São Paulo	"Flor e o Beija-Flor"	–	✔	✔
Episode 1 (May 1, 2022)	12	Artur de Mari	11	Canoas	"Apenas um Rapaz Latino Americano"	✔	✔	✔
Episode 2 (May 8, 2022)	1	Julia Castro	13	Santana de Parnaíba	"At Last"	✔	✔	✔
Episode 2 (May 8, 2022)	2	Kaio Álvaro	9	Goianésia do Pará	"Fui Fiel"	–	✔	–
Episode 2 (May 8, 2022)	3	Letícia Araújo	12	Rio de Janeiro	"A Bela e a Fera"	✔	✔	✔
Episode 2 (May 8, 2022)	4	Tavinho Porto Rico	10	Lagarto	"Zombie"	✔	✔	–
Episode 2 (May 8, 2022)	5	Karin Barros	9	Camaçari	"De Volta pro Aconchego"	✔	–	–
Episode 2 (May 8, 2022)	6	Sávio & Gustavo	9–13	Belo Horizonte	"No Dia em Que Eu Saí de Casa"	✔	✔	✔
Episode 2 (May 8, 2022)	7	Isadora Benites	14	Pelotas	"Como Nossos Pais"	–	✔	–
Episode 2 (May 8, 2022)	8	Isabela Moreno	12	João Pessoa	"Sebastiana"	✔	–	–
Episode 2 (May 8, 2022)	9	Letícia Garcia	11	Franca	"Rosas"	–	–	–
Episode 2 (May 8, 2022)	10	Maria Laura	11	Santos Dumont	"Samba de Verão"	✔	✔	✔
Episode 2 (May 8, 2022)	11	Davi Andrade	10	Ponte Serrada	"Como Vai Você?"	✔	✔	✔
Episode 2 (May 8, 2022)	12	Alice Cardoso	10	Cruz Alta	"Ovelha Negra"	✔	✔	–
Episode 2 (May 8, 2022)	13	Esther Jullya Carvalho	11	Mineiros	"Porteira Velha"	–	✔	✔
Episode 2 (May 8, 2022)	14	Francine Maria	14	Ibiapina	"Esperando na Janela"	✔	✔	✔
Episode 3 (May 15, 2022)	1	Esther Samuel	10	Niterói	"Vira Virou"	✔	✔	✔
Episode 3 (May 15, 2022)	2	Heitor Gusmão	12	Rio de Janeiro	"Eu Não Vou"	✔	✔	–
Episode 3 (May 15, 2022)	3	Pedro Henrique	13	Maceió	"Por Um Minuto"	–	✔	–
Episode 3 (May 15, 2022)	4	Manu Anjas	11	Americana	"Estúpido Cupido"	–	✔	✔
Episode 3 (May 15, 2022)	5	Emily Teixeira	13	Passo Fundo	"Na Sua Estante"	–	✔	–
Episode 3 (May 15, 2022)	6	Miguel Ruas	9	Esteio	"Sangrando"	✔	–	✔
Episode 3 (May 15, 2022)	7	Bia Klappoth	14	Curitiba	"Reckless"	✔	✔	✔
Episode 3 (May 15, 2022)	8	Carol Brasil	10	Jacarezinho	"Cajuína"	✔	✔	✔
Episode 3 (May 15, 2022)	9	Valentina Dadalt	10	Cachoeirinha	"Do Lado de Cá"	–	–	–
Episode 3 (May 15, 2022)	10	Vitória Heck	12	Porto Alegre	"O Trem Azul"	✔	✔	–
Episode 3 (May 15, 2022)	11	Giovanna Barbiero	12	Ponta Grossa	"River"	✔	✔	–
Episode 3 (May 15, 2022)	12	Rafa Lemos	12	Franca	"Linda Demais"	–	–	✔
Episode 3 (May 15, 2022)	13	Giulia Foganholli	10	Curitiba	"Mercedita"	✔	✔	✔
Episode 3 (May 15, 2022)	14	Leonardo Freire	12	São Paulo	"Meu Talismã"	✔	✔	✔
Episode 4 (May 22, 2022)	1	Isis Testa	10	Natal	"Listen"	✔	✔	✔
Episode 4 (May 22, 2022)	2	Julia Almeida	14	Sete Lagoas	"Evidências"	–	✔	✔
Episode 4 (May 22, 2022)	3	Duda Sena	13	Nazaré Paulista	"Canto das Três Raças"	✔	–	–
Episode 4 (May 22, 2022)	4	Antonio Marques	10	Cabedelo	"Qui Nem Jiló"	✔	✔	✔
Episode 4 (May 22, 2022)	5	Laís Paixão	11	São Paulo	"Estrada da Vida"	–	✔	–
Episode 4 (May 22, 2022)	6	Nanda Santiago	13	Aracaju	"Send My Love (To Your New Lover)"	✔	✔	–
Episode 4 (May 22, 2022)	7	Bernardo Yuri	11	Abelardo Luz	"Romaria"	✔	✔	✔
Episode 4 (May 22, 2022)	8	Yves Maria	13	Itacoatiara	"Eu Só Queria Te Amar (¡Corre!)"	–	✔	–
Episode 4 (May 22, 2022)	9	Maria Alice	11	Valinhos	"João e Maria"	–	–	–
Episode 4 (May 22, 2022)	10	Amora	14	Fortaleza	"Billionaire"	✔	✔	–
Episode 4 (May 22, 2022)	11	Bianca Guterres	14	Brasília	"Como uma Onda"	–	–	✔
Episode 4 (May 22, 2022)	12	Jolie	11	Niterói	"História de uma Gata"	✔	✔	✔
Episode 4 (May 22, 2022)	13	Igor Valença	10	Recife	"Feeling Good"	–	✔	–
Episode 4 (May 22, 2022)	14	Mel Grebin	11	Canoas	"I Will Always Love You"	✔	–	✔
Episode 5 (May 29, 2022)	1	Lorenah	13	Mococa	"Medo Bobo"	✔	✔	✔
Episode 5 (May 29, 2022)	2	Sara Antonybele	13	Teresina	"Carcará"	✔	–	✔
Episode 5 (May 29, 2022)	3	Alannah Schuu	9	Rio de Janeiro	"Reach"	✔	✔	✔
Episode 5 (May 29, 2022)	4	Fernanda Lopes	13	Osasco	"Felicidade"	–	✔	–
Episode 5 (May 29, 2022)	5	João Felipe Bistene	11	Belo Horizonte	"Ben"	✔	–	–
Episode 5 (May 29, 2022)	6	BÊ	14	Eunápolis	"Onde Deus Possa Me Ouvir"	✔	–	✔
Episode 5 (May 29, 2022)	7	Débora Azevedo	13	Olinda	"Onde Anda Você"	✔	✔	✔
Episode 5 (May 29, 2022)	8	Diego Marques	11	São Pedro do Suaçuí	"Ficha Limpa"	–	✔	✔
Episode 5 (May 29, 2022)	9	Laura Andrade	12	Natal	"Ciranda da Bailarina"	–	–	–
Episode 5 (May 29, 2022)	10	Duda Loba	13	Salvador	"Samba da Minha Terra"	✔	✔	–
Episode 5 (May 29, 2022)	11	Ana Felps	13	Joinville	"Pretty Hurts"	✔	✔	✔
Episode 5 (May 29, 2022)	12	Beca	13	Curitiba	"Beija Eu"	✔	–	–
Episode 5 (May 29, 2022)	13	Letty	10	Arapiraca	"Asa Branca"	Team full	✔	✔
Episode 5 (May 29, 2022)	14	Lorena Araújo	10	Sete Lagoas	"Tropicana"	Team full	Team full	✔

== The Battles ==
Artist won the Battle and advanced to the Showdowns
Artist lost the Battle and was eliminated

Episode	Coach	Order	Winner	Song	Losers	
Episode 6 (June 5, 2022)	Carlinhos Brown	1	Bielzinho	"Superfantástico"	Giovanna Barbiero	Jolie
Episode 6 (June 5, 2022)	Maiara & Maraisa	2	Isis Testa	"Easy on Me"	Alice Cardoso	Letty
Episode 6 (June 5, 2022)	Michel Teló	3	Esther Jullya Carvalho	"Sem Sal"	Giulia Foganholli	Miguel Ruas
Episode 6 (June 5, 2022)	Maiara & Maraisa	4	Amora	"Pupila"	Emily Teixeira	Fernanda Lopes
Episode 6 (June 5, 2022)	Michel Teló	5	Mel Grebin	"That's What Friends Are For"	Fernandinha	Iris Mantovani
Episode 6 (June 5, 2022)	Carlinhos Brown	6	Letícia Araújo	"Aprendendo a Jogar"	Duda Lobo	Sara Antonybele
Episode 6 (June 5, 2022)	Maiara & Maraisa	7	Kaio Alvaro	"Termina Comigo Antes"	Pedro Henrique	Tavinho Porto Rico
Episode 7 (June 12, 2022)	Michel Teló	1	Davi Andrade	"A Vida do Viajante"	Antonio Marques	Lorena Araújo
Episode 7 (June 12, 2022)	Maiara & Maraisa	2	Debora Azevedo	"Best Part"	Cecilia Amorim	Isadora Benites
Episode 7 (June 12, 2022)	Carlinhos Brown	3	Isadora Pedrini	"O Nosso Santo Bateu"	Beca	Carol Brasil
Episode 7 (June 12, 2022)	Michel Teló	4	Julia Castro	"No Time to Die"	Alannah Schuu	Esther Samuel
Episode 7 (June 12, 2022)	Maiara & Maraisa	5	Lorenah	"É o Amor"	Luís Miguel	Mateus Cassemiro
Episode 7 (June 12, 2022)	Michel Teló	6	Bianca Guterres	"Depois"	Ana Felps	Manu Anjos
Episode 7 (June 12, 2022)	Carlinhos Brown	7	Artur de Mari	"Here Comes the Sun"	Heitor Gusmão	João Felipe Bistene
Episode 8 (June 19, 2022)	Carlinhos Brown	1	Nanda Santiago	"Deja Vu"	Bia Klappoth	Gabi Sorroce
Episode 8 (June 19, 2022)	Michel Teló	2	Sávio & Gustavo	"Canarinho Prisioneiro"	Gabriela Muniz	Julia Almeida
Episode 8 (June 19, 2022)	Maiara & Maraisa	3	Leonardo Freire	"Ghost"	Igor Valença	Yves Maria
Episode 8 (June 19, 2022)	Carlinhos Brown	4	Francine Maria	"O Xote das Meninas"	Isabela Moreno	Karin Barros
Episode 8 (June 19, 2022)	Michel Teló	5	Rafa Lemos	"Alô"	Bernardo Yuri	Diego Marques
Episode 8 (June 19, 2022)	Carlinhos Brown	6	Arthur Marçal	"Quase Sem Querer"	BÊ	Duda Sena
Episode 8 (June 19, 2022)	Maiara & Maraisa	7	Maria Laura	"Presepada"	Laís Paixão	Vitória Heck

== Showdowns ==
Artist was chosen by their coach and advanced to the Live shows
Artist was eliminated
Artist was disqualified

Episode	Coach	Order	Artist	Song	Result
Episode 9 (June 26, 2022)	Michel Teló (& Toni Garrido)	1	Davi Andrade	"Luar do Sertão"	Eliminated
Episode 9 (June 26, 2022)	Michel Teló (& Toni Garrido)	2	Julia Castro	—	Disqualified
Episode 9 (June 26, 2022)	Michel Teló (& Toni Garrido)	3	Mel Grebin	"Shallow"	Coach's choice
Episode 9 (June 26, 2022)	Michel Teló (& Toni Garrido)	4	Rafa Lemos	"Volta Pra Mim"	Coach's choice
Episode 9 (June 26, 2022)	Maiara & Maraisa	5	Kaio Alvaro	"Não Aprendi Dizer Adeus"	Coach's choice
Episode 9 (June 26, 2022)	Maiara & Maraisa	6	Lorenah	"Se Deus Me Ouvisse"	Eliminated
Episode 9 (June 26, 2022)	Maiara & Maraisa	7	Maria Laura	"Wave"	Eliminated
Episode 9 (June 26, 2022)	Carlinhos Brown	8	Artur de Mari	"Dona"	Coach's choice
Episode 9 (June 26, 2022)	Carlinhos Brown	9	Francine Maria	"Reconvexo"	Eliminated
Episode 9 (June 26, 2022)	Carlinhos Brown	10	Isadora Pedrini	"Impossible"	Coach's choice
Episode 9 (June 26, 2022)	Carlinhos Brown	11	Letícia Araujo	"Happy"	Eliminated
Episode 10 (July 3, 2022)	Maiara & Maraisa	1	Amora	"Can't Take My Eyes Off You"	Eliminated
Episode 10 (July 3, 2022)	Maiara & Maraisa	2	Débora Azevedo	"If I Ain't Got You"	Coach's choice
Episode 10 (July 3, 2022)	Maiara & Maraisa	3	Isis Testa	"Saber Quem Sou (How Far I'll Go)"	Coach's choice
Episode 10 (July 3, 2022)	Maiara & Maraisa	4	Leonardo Freire	"Rise Up"	Eliminated
Episode 10 (July 3, 2022)	Carlinhos Brown	5	Arthur Marçal	"Caruso"	Coach's choice
Episode 10 (July 3, 2022)	Carlinhos Brown	6	Bielzinho	"Tijolinho Por Tijolinho"	Eliminated
Episode 10 (July 3, 2022)	Carlinhos Brown	7	Nanda Santiago	"Ouvi Dizer"	Eliminated
Episode 10 (July 3, 2022)	Michel Teló (& Toni Garrido)	8	Bianca Guterres	"When I Was Your Man"	Eliminated
Episode 10 (July 3, 2022)	Michel Teló (& Toni Garrido)	9	Esther Jullya Carvalho	—	Disqualified
Episode 10 (July 3, 2022)	Michel Teló (& Toni Garrido)	10	Sávio & Gustavo	"Saudade de Minha Terra"	Coach's choice

== Live shows ==
=== Week 1: Semifinals ===
Artist got more points and advanced to the Finals
Artist was eliminated

Episode	Coach	Order	Artist	Song	Result		
Episode	Coach	Order	Artist	Song	Public points	Coach points	Total points
Episode 11 (July 10, 2022)	Michel Teló	1	Mel Grebin	"Força Estranha"	59.20	20.00	79.20
Episode 11 (July 10, 2022)	Michel Teló	2	Rafa Lemos	"Na Hora de Amar (Spending My Time)"	14.27	00.00	14.27
Episode 11 (July 10, 2022)	Michel Teló	3	Sávio & Gustavo	"Eu Só Penso Em Você (Always on My Mind)"	26.53	00.00	26.53
Episode 11 (July 10, 2022)	Maiara & Maraisa	4	Débora Azevedo	"Someone You Loved"	19.63	00.00	19.63
Episode 11 (July 10, 2022)	Maiara & Maraisa	5	Isis Testa	"Nuvem de Lágrimas"	46.68	20.00	66.68
Episode 11 (July 10, 2022)	Maiara & Maraisa	6	Kaio Alvaro	"Café e Amor"	33.69	00.00	33.69
Episode 11 (July 10, 2022)	Carlinhos Brown	7	Arthur Marçal	"'O sole mio"	28.46	00.00	28.46
Episode 11 (July 10, 2022)	Carlinhos Brown	8	Artur de Mari	"Encontros e Despedidas"	43.47	00.00	43.47
Episode 11 (July 10, 2022)	Carlinhos Brown	9	Isadora Pedrini	"And I Am Telling You I'm Not Going"	28.07	20.00	48.07

=== Week 2: Finals ===
Episode	Coach	Artist	Order	Song	Order	Song	Result
Episode 12 (July 17, 2022)	Carlinhos Brown	Isadora Pedrini	1	"Dona de Mim"	4	"Chandelier"	Runner-up
Episode 12 (July 17, 2022)	Maiara & Maraisa	Isis Testa	2	"Pense em Mim"	5	"I Have Nothing"	Winner (43.65%)
Episode 12 (July 17, 2022)	Michel Teló	Mel Grebin	3	"Eu Sei Que Vou Te Amar"	6	"Stand by Me"	Runner-up

== Elimination chart ==
Key

- Team Brown
- Team Maiara & Maraisa
- Team Teló

Results

- Winner
- Runner-up
- Advanced to the final
- Eliminated

Live shows results per week
Artist	Week 1	Week 2
Isis Testa	Advanced	Winner
Isadora Pedrini	Advanced	Runner-up
Mel Grebin	Advanced	Runner-up
Arthur Marçal	Eliminated	Eliminated (week 1)
Artur de Mari	Eliminated	Eliminated (week 1)
Débora Azevedo	Eliminated	Eliminated (week 1)
Kaio Alvaro	Eliminated	Eliminated (week 1)
Rafa Lemos	Eliminated	Eliminated (week 1)
Sávio & Gustavo	Eliminated	Eliminated (week 1)

== Ratings and reception ==
=== Brazilian ratings ===
All numbers are in points and provided by Kantar Ibope Media.

Episode	Title	Air date	Timeslot (BRT)	SP viewers (in points)	Source
1	The Blind Auditions 1	May 1, 2022	Sunday 2:30 p.m.	11.3	
2	The Blind Auditions 2	May 8, 2022	Sunday 2:30 p.m.	09.8	
3	The Blind Auditions 3	May 15, 2022	Sunday 2:30 p.m.	13.6	
4	The Blind Auditions 4	May 22, 2022	Sunday 2:30 p.m.	12.8	
5	The Blind Auditions 5	May 29, 2022	Sunday 2:30 p.m.	12.5	
6	The Battles 1	June 5, 2022	Sunday 2:30 p.m.	11.3	
7	The Battles 2	June 12, 2022	Sunday 2:30 p.m.	11.9	
8	The Battles 3	June 19, 2022	Sunday 2:30 p.m.	12.7	
9	Showdowns 1	June 26, 2022	Sunday 2:30 p.m.	12.1	
10	Showdowns 2	July 3, 2022	Sunday 2:30 p.m.	11.6	
11	Semifinals	July 10, 2022	Sunday 2:30 p.m.	12.0	
12	Finals	July 17, 2022	Sunday 2:30 p.m.	10.8	

- In 2022, each point represents 258.821 households in 15 market cities in Brazil (74.666 households in São Paulo).
