= The Voice Kids (Brazilian TV series) =

- Genre: Reality show
- Created by: John de Mol Jr. Roel van Velzen
- Directed by: J. B. de Oliveira; Creso Eduardo Macedo
- Presented by: Fátima Bernardes; Thalita Rebouças; André Marques; Tiago Leifert; Kika Martinez; Márcio Garcia
- Judges: Victor & Leo; Ivete Sangalo; Carlinhos Brown; Simone & Simaria; Claudia Leitte; Gaby Amarantos; Michel Teló; Maiara & Maraisa; Iza; Mumuzinho
- Country of origin: Brazil
- Original language: Portuguese
- No. of seasons: 8
- No. of episodes: 104

Production
- Production locations: Rio de Janeiro, Brazil
- Camera setup: Multiple-camera
- Running time: 75 minutes
- Production companies: Talpa Media (2016–2019); Endemol Shine Brasil (2016–2019); ITV Studios (2020–2023)

Original release
- Network: TV Globo (2016–2023)
- Release: January 3, 2016 – July 9, 2023

Related
- The Voice (franchise); The Voice Brasil; The Voice +

The Voice Kids is a Brazilian music talent show which premiered on TV Globo on January 3, 2016, and ended on July 9, 2023. Based on the reality singing competition The Voice Kids, the series was created by Dutch television producer John de Mol Jr..

The series' original coaches were Carlinhos Brown, Ivete Sangalo and Victor & Leo. Victor Chaves left the show midway through season 2 due to his wife's allegations against him concerning domestic violence. As a result, previously recorded footage of him was edited out from episodes 8 and 9, and Leo became a solo coach for the remaining of the season.

After two seasons, Ivete Sangalo swapped roles with Claudia Leitte to become a coach on The Voice Brasil, while Simone & Simaria replaced Victor & Leo permanently for season three. For season six, Gaby Amarantos and Michel Teló replaced Claudia Leitte and Simone & Simaria respectively. Maiara & Maraisa replaced Gaby Amarantos for season seven. In last season eight, Iza and Mumuzinho replaced Maiara & Maraisa and Michel Teló, respectively.

In August 2023, Globo announced that the upcoming 12th season of the regular series would be the last, thus cancelling the children's version after season eight.

== Overview ==
The series is part of The Voice franchise and is based on a similar competition format in the Netherlands entitled The Voice of Holland. The winner receives a R$ 250.000 prize and a recording contract with Universal Music Group. Participants are required to be between the ages of 8 and 14.

== Format ==
The series consists of three phases:

- Blind audition
- Battle round
- Live performance shows

=== Blind audition ===
Three coaches, all famous musicians, will choose teams of 18–24 contestants each through a blind audition process. Each judge has the length of the auditionee's performance to decide if he or she wants that singer on his or her team; if two or more judges want the same singer then the singer gets to choose which coach they want to work with.

=== Battle round ===
Each team of singers will be mentored and developed by their coach. In this stage, coaches will have three of their team members battle against each other by singing the same song, with the coach choosing which team member will advance to the next stage.

=== Live performance shows ===
In the final phase, the remaining contestants of each team will compete against each other in 2–5 weeks of live broadcasts. The television audience will help to decide who moves on. When one team member remains for each coach, these three contestants will compete against each other in the season finale, with the most voted singer declared the season's winner.

== Coaches and hosts ==
=== Coaches ===
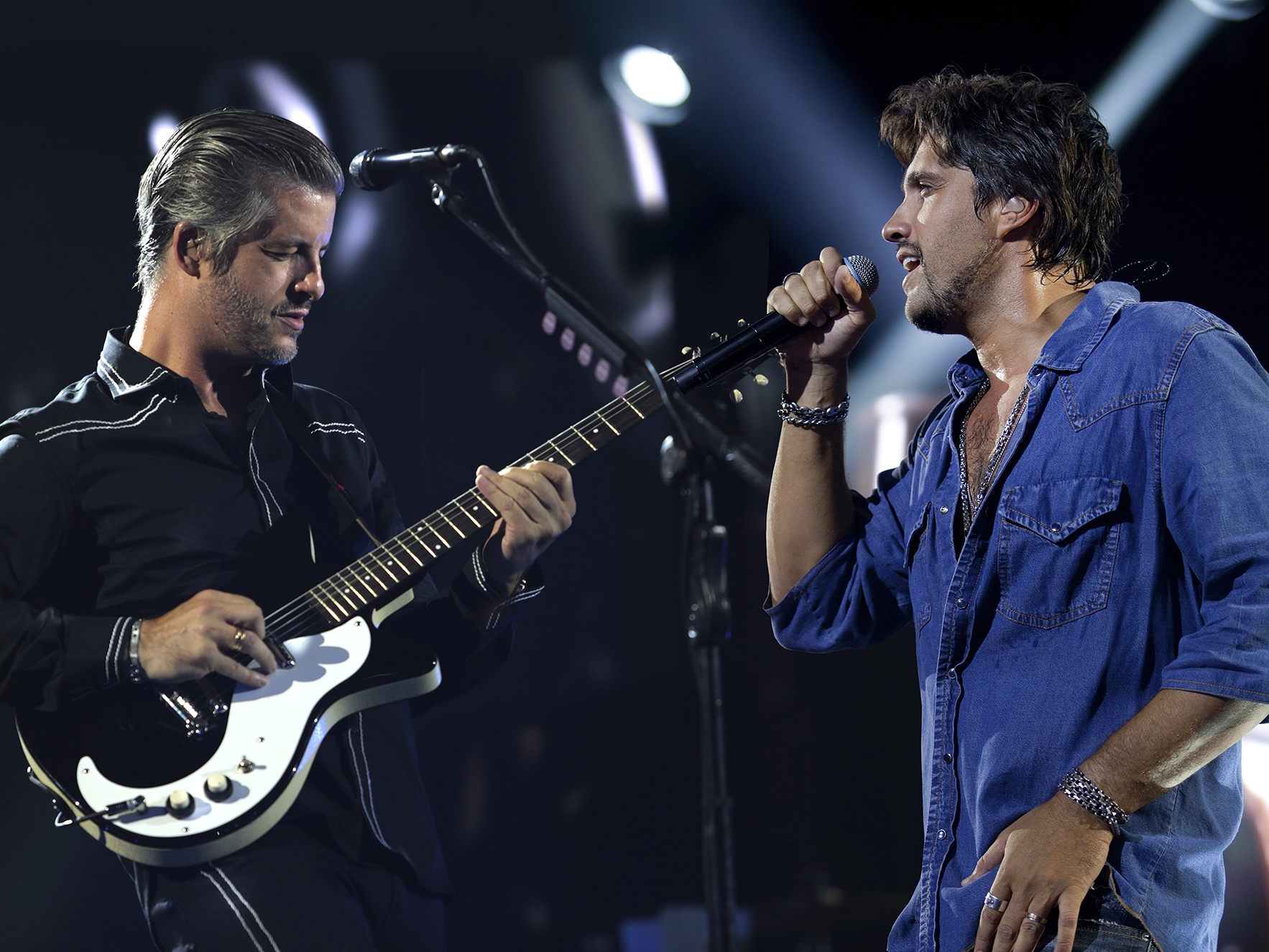
Victor & Leo (1-2)

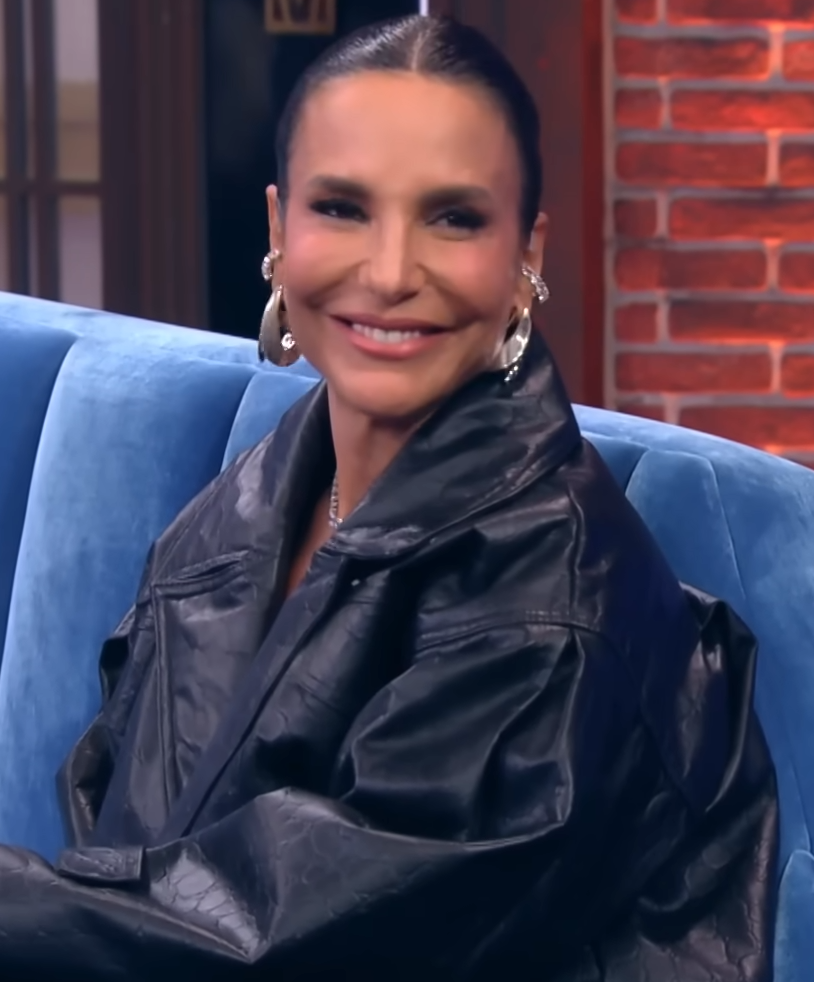
Ivete Sangalo (1-2)

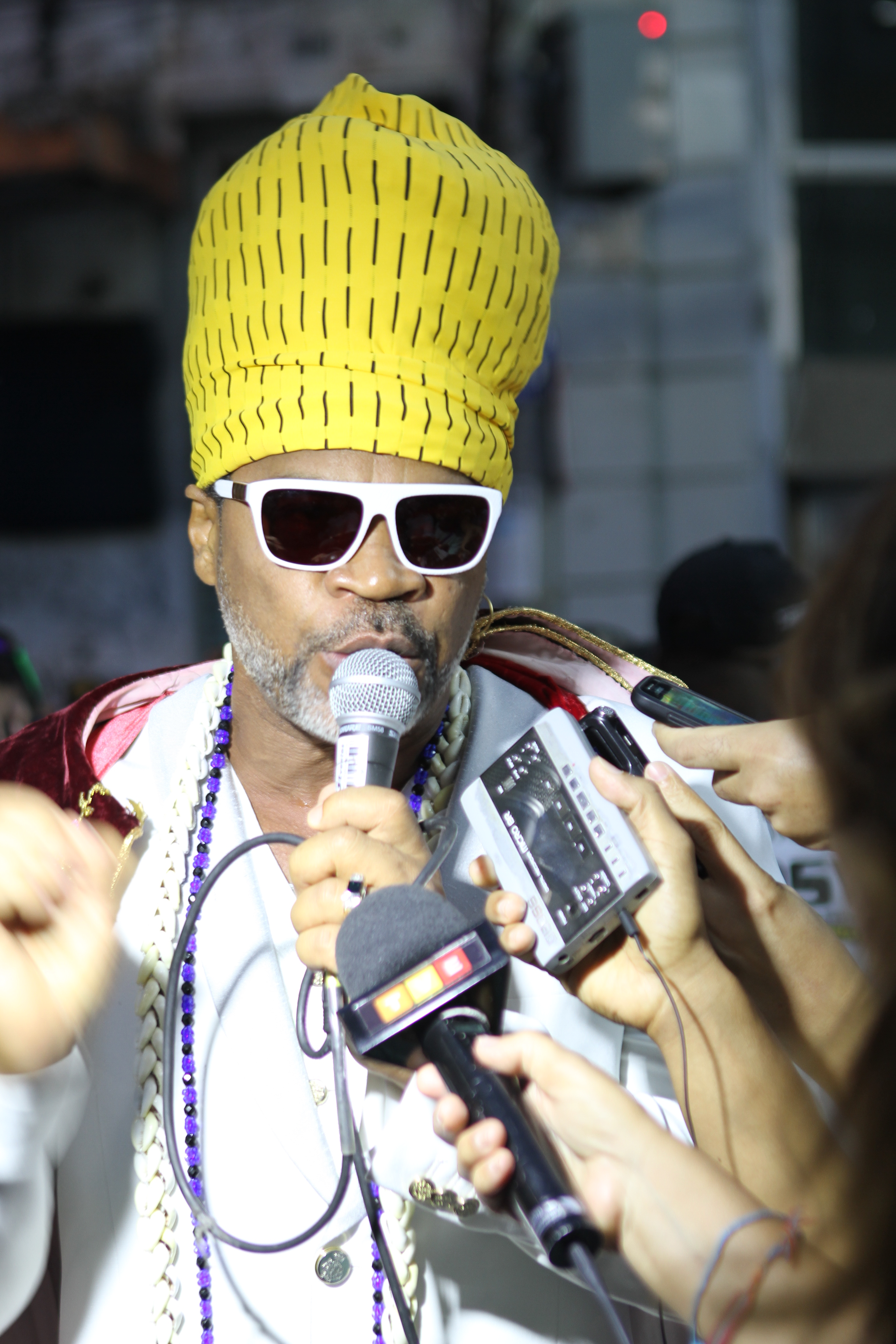
Carlinhos Brown (1-8)

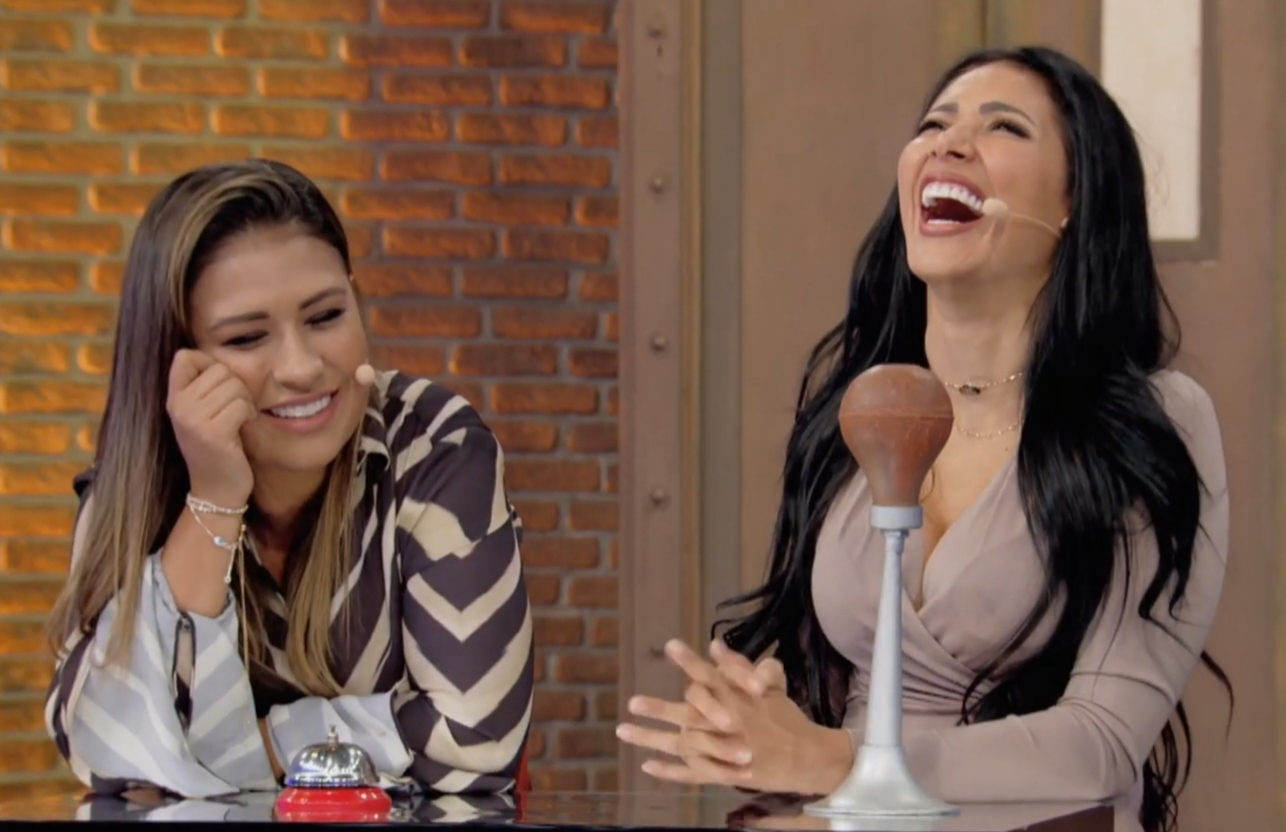
Simone & Simaria (3-5)

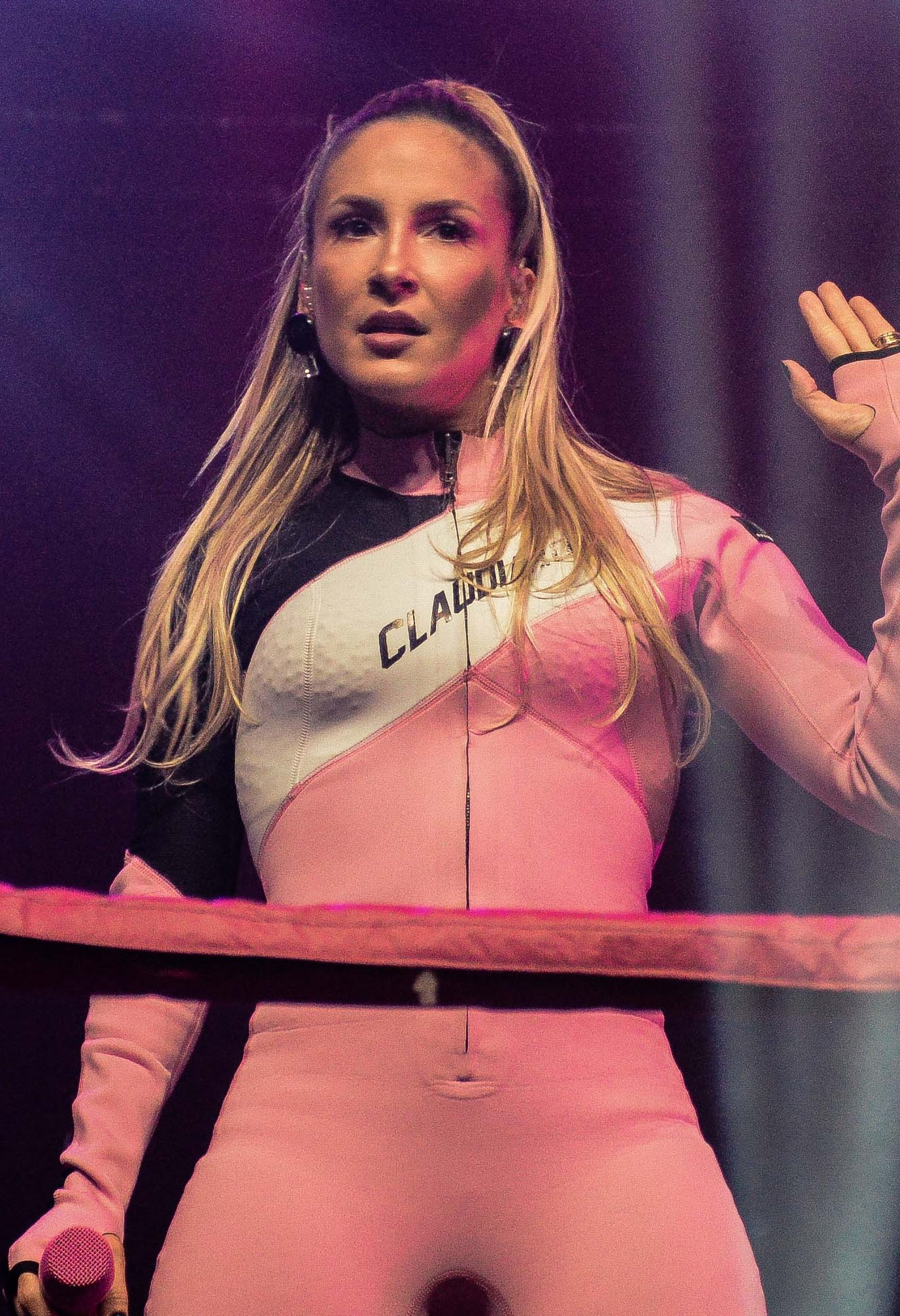
Claudia Leitte (3-5)

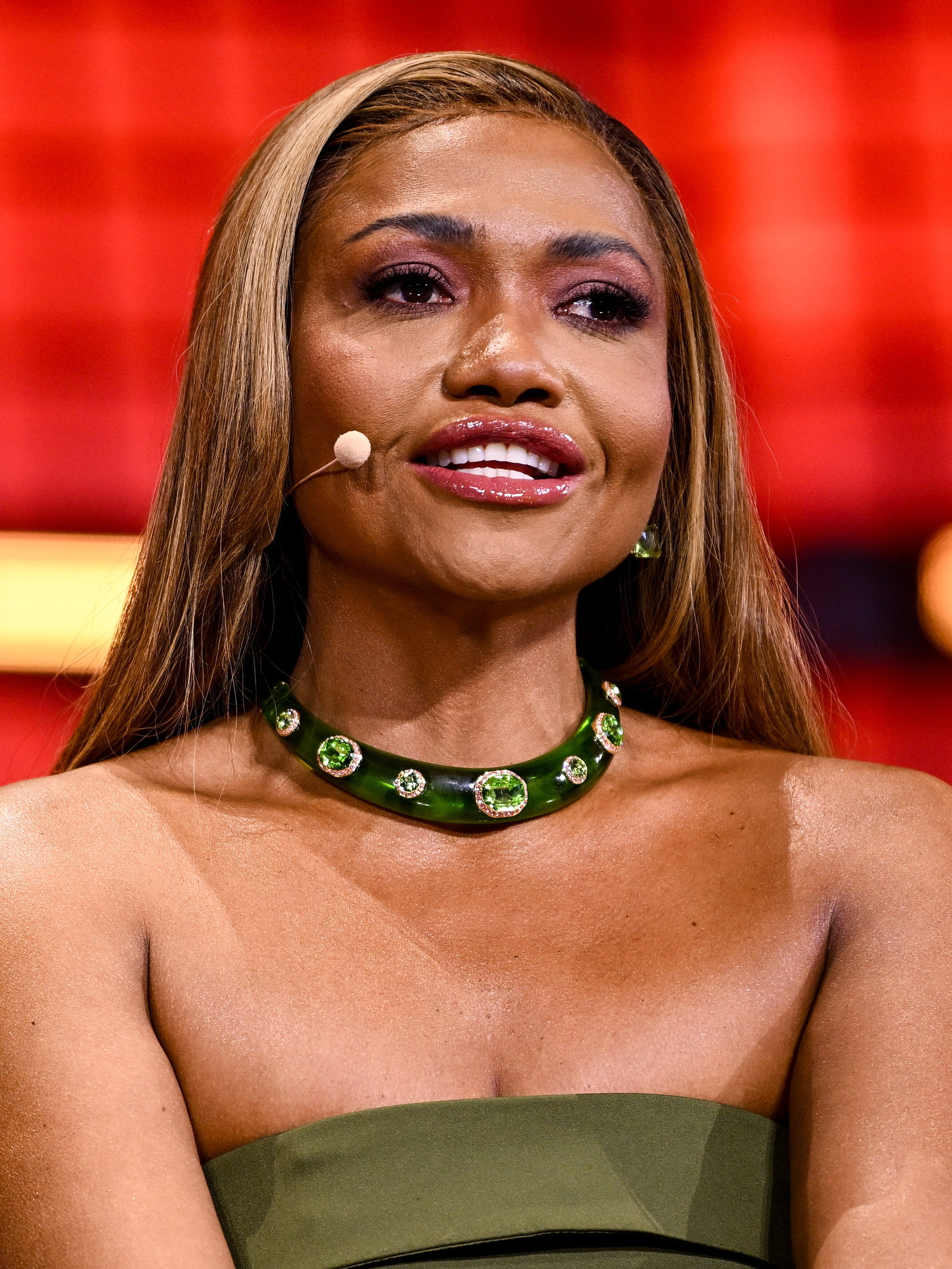
Gaby Amarantos ( 6 )

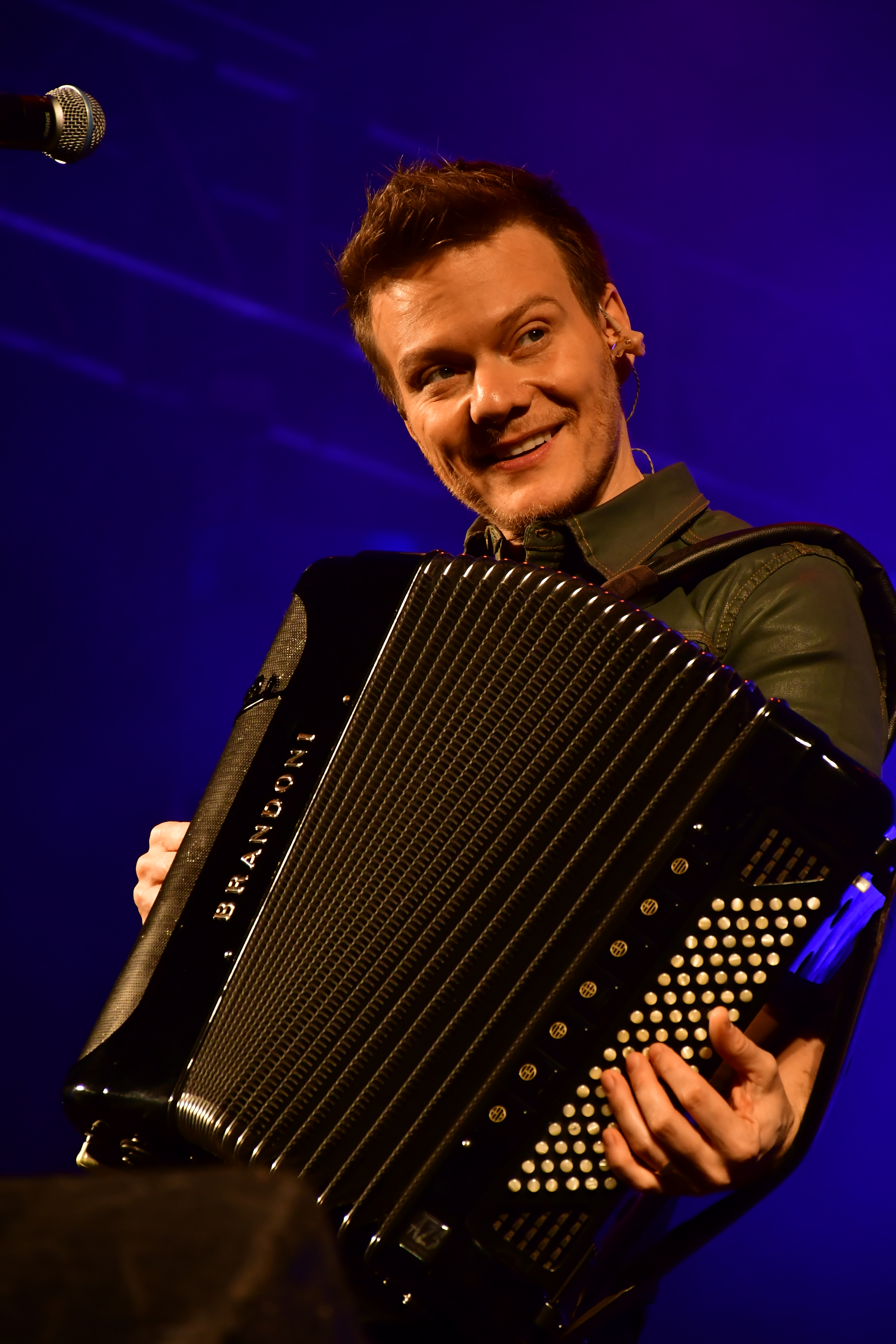
Michel Teló (6-7)

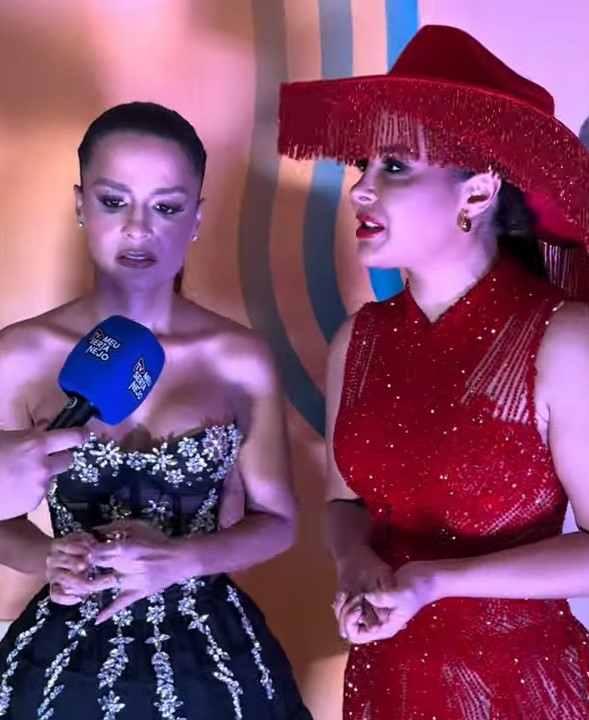
Maiara & Maraisa (7)

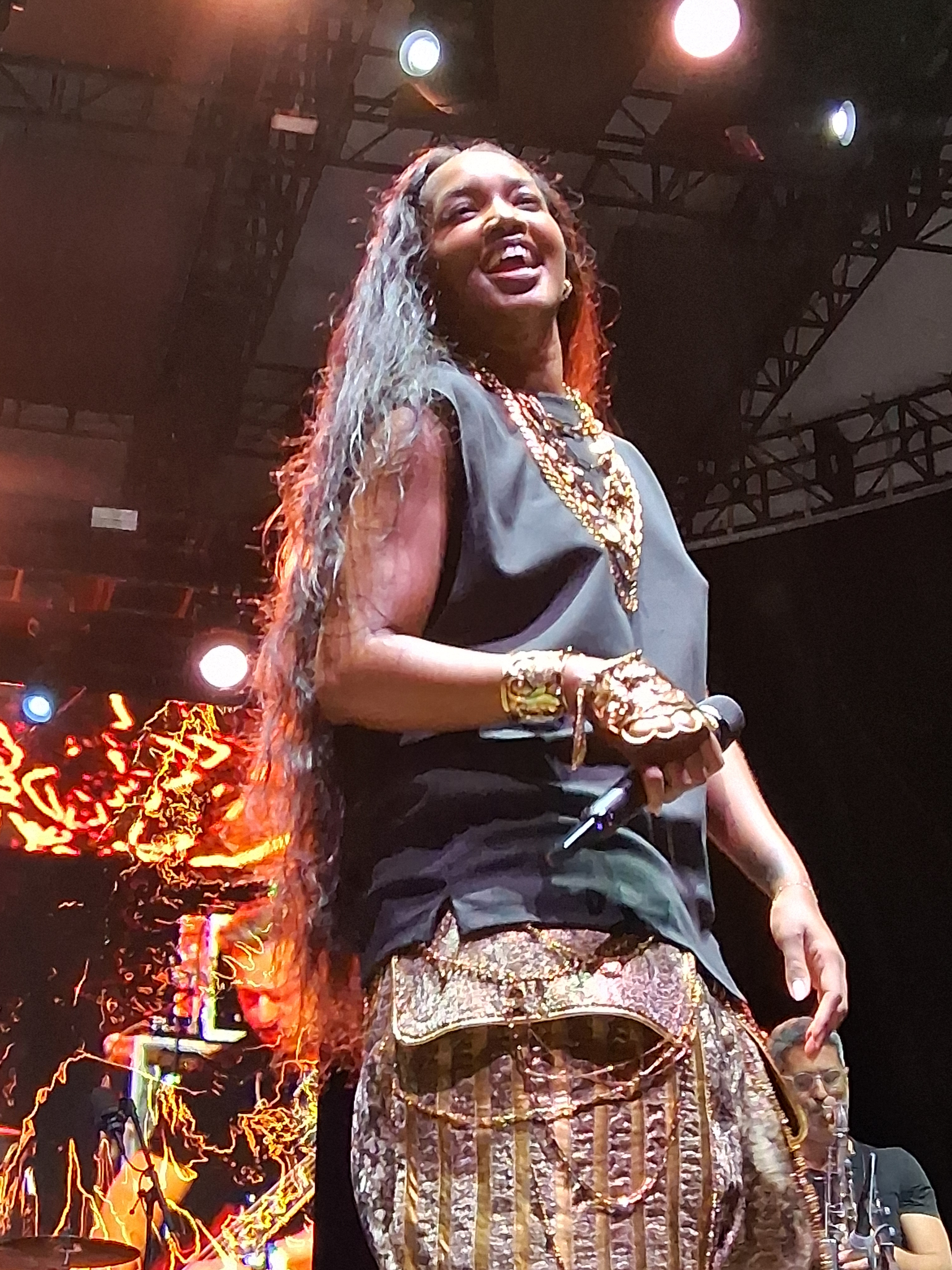
Iza (8)

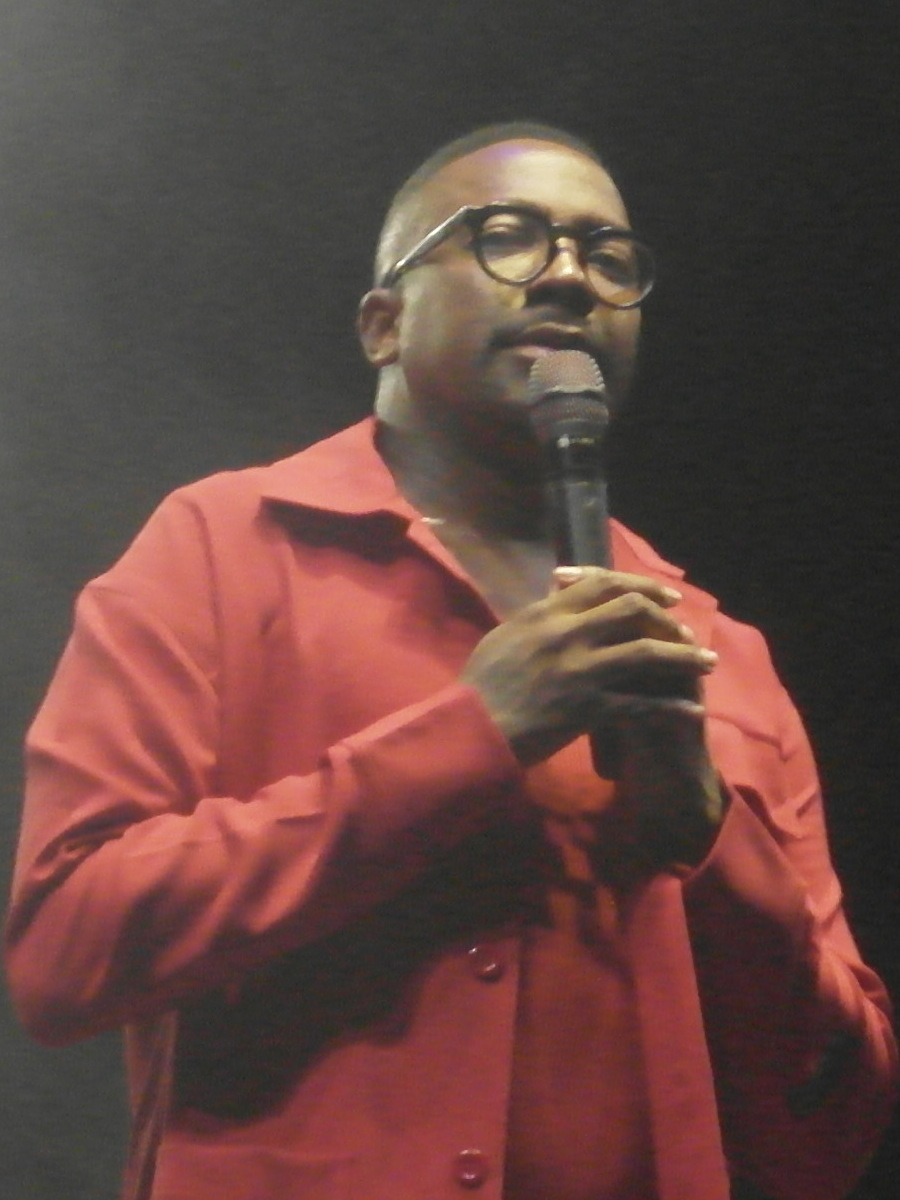
Mumuzinho (8)

Coach	Seasons							
Coach	1	2	3	4	5	6	7	8
Victor & Leo								
Ivete Sangalo								
Carlinhos Brown								
Simone & Simaria								
Claudia Leitte (Note: Claudia was replaced by Mumuzinho during the live shows in season five.)								
Gaby Amarantos								
Michel Teló								
Maiara & Maraisa								
Iza								
Mumuzinho								

=== Hosts ===
Host	Seasons							
Host	1	2	3	4	5	6	7	8
Tiago Leifert								
Kika Martinez								
André Marques								
Thalita Rebouças								
Márcio Garcia								
Fátima Bernardes								

Key
Main host
Backstage

== Series overview ==
Brazilian The Voice Kids series overview
Season	Aired	Winner	Other finalists			Winning coach	Hosts		Coaches (chairs' order)		
Season	Aired	Winner	Other finalists			Winning coach	Main	Backstage	1	2	3
1	2016	Wagner Barreto	Pérola Crepaldi	Rafa Gomes	No fourth finalist	Victor & Leo	Tiago Leifert	Kika Martinez	Victor & Leo	Ivete	Brown
2	2017	Thomas Machado	Juan Carlos Poca	Valentina Francisco	No fourth finalist	Ivete Sangalo	André Marques	Thalita Rebouças	Victor & Leo	Ivete	Brown
3	2018	Eduarda Brasil	Mariah Yohana	Neto Junqueira	Talita Cipriano	Simone & Simaria	André Marques	Thalita Rebouças	Brown	Simone & Simaria	Claudia
4	2019	Jeremias Reis	Luiza Barbosa	Raylla Araújo	No fourth finalist	Simone & Simaria	André Marques	Thalita Rebouças	Brown	Simone & Simaria	Claudia
5	2020	Kauê Penna	Maria Ribeiro	Paulo Gomiz	No fourth finalist	Carlinhos Brown	André Marques	Thalita Rebouças	Brown	Simone & Simaria	Claudia
6	2021	Gustavo Bardim	Helloysa do Pandeiro	Izabelle Ribeiro	No fourth finalist	Michel Teló	Márcio Garcia	Thalita Rebouças	Brown	Gaby	Teló
7	2022	Isis Testa	Isadora Pedrini	Mel Grebin	No fourth finalist	Maiara & Maraisa	Márcio Garcia	Thalita Rebouças	Brown	Maiara & Maraisa	Teló
8	2023	Henrique Lima	Emanuel Motta	Isa Camargo	No fourth finalist	Mumuzinho	Fátima Bernardes		Brown	Iza	Mumu

== Ratings and reception ==
Season	Timeslot	Premiered		Ended		TV season	SP viewers (in points)	Source
Season	Timeslot	Date	Viewers (in points)	Date	Viewers (in points)	TV season	SP viewers (in points)	Source
1	Sunday 2:00 pm (BST); Sunday 1:00 pm (BRT)	January 3, 2016	17.8	March 27, 2016	16.2	2016	15.96	
2	Sunday 2:00 pm (BST); Sunday 1:00 pm (BRT)	January 8, 2017	15.9	April 2, 2017	16.7	2017	15.77	
3	Sunday 2:00 pm (BST); Sunday 1:00 pm (BRT)	January 7, 2018	19.7	April 8, 2018	17.9	2018	18.19	
4	Sunday 2:00 pm (BST); Sunday 1:00 pm (BRT)	January 6, 2019	15.3	April 14, 2019	17.8	2019	16.01	
5	Sunday 1:00 pm (BRT)	January 5, 2020	14.2	October 11, 2020	09.3	2020	12.75	
6	Sunday 2:30 pm (BRT)	June 6, 2021	13.2	September 26, 2021	13.3	2021	12.06	
7	Sunday 2:30 pm (BRT)	May 1, 2022	11.3	July 17, 2022	10.8	2022	11.87	
8	Sunday 2:30 pm (BRT)	April 9, 2023	10.0	July 9, 2023	11.0	2023	10.27	

== The Voice Kids no Parquinho ==
An aftershow series titled The Voice Kids no Parquinho and presented by Ana Clara Lima premiered on Globoplay on June 11, 2021.
