= Sapucaia do Sul =

Municipality of Rio Grande do Sul, Brazil

- Municipality
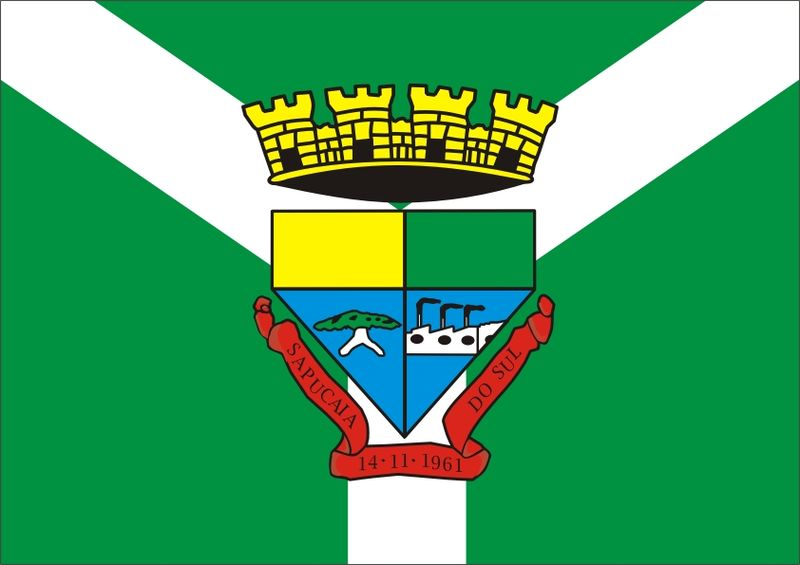
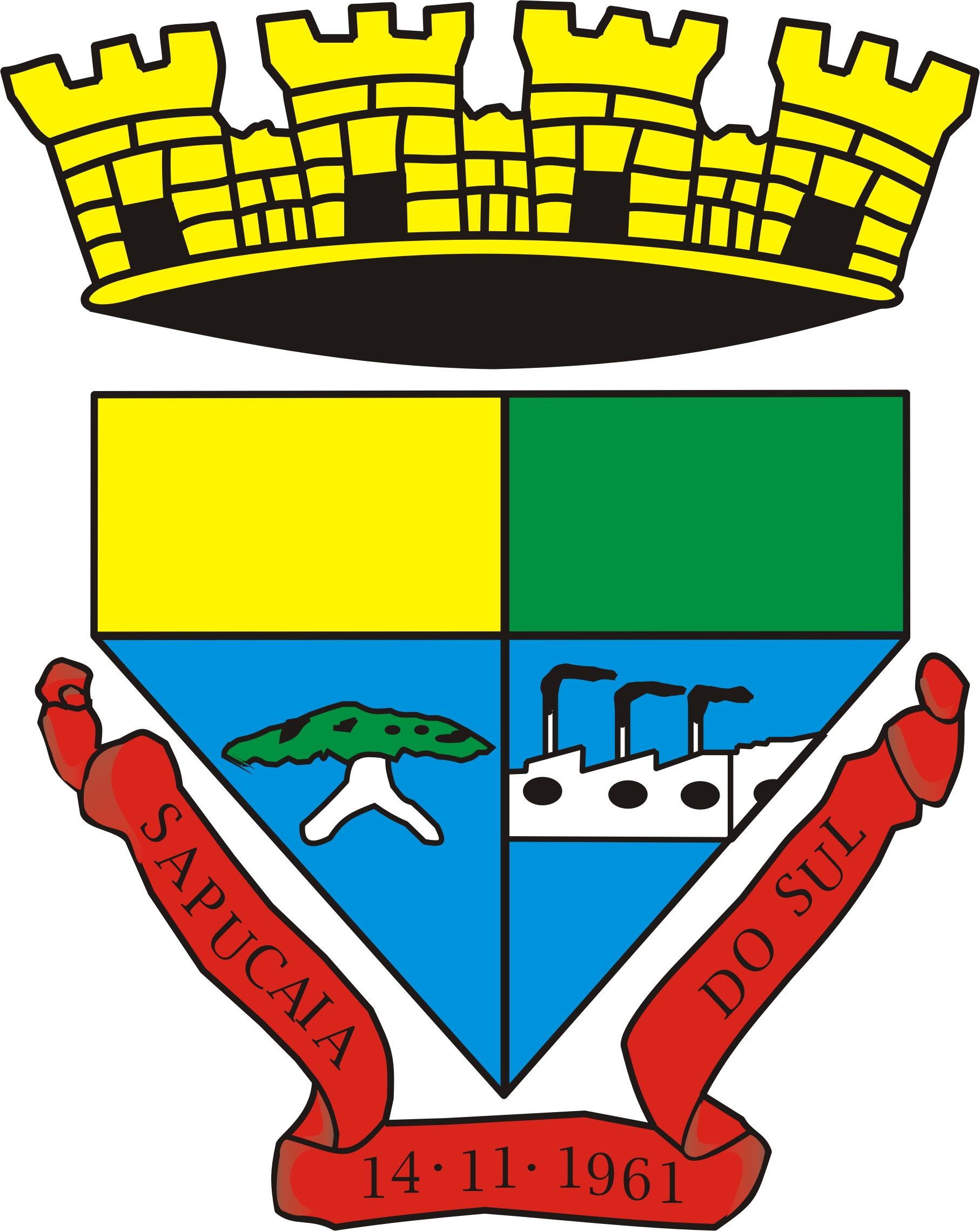
- Flag Coat of arms
- Motto: Attitude, willpower and eyes on the future

- Location in Brazil
- Coordinates: 29°50′20″S 51°08′38″W
- Country: Brazil
- Region: South
- State: Rio Grande do Sul
- Founded: 1961

Government
  - Mayor: Volmir Rodrigues (PP)

Area
  - Total: 58.309 km^{2} (22.513 sq mi)
- Elevation: 35 m (115 ft)

Population (2022 Census)
  - Total: 132,107
  - Estimate (2025): 136,572
  - Density: 2,265.6/km^{2} (5,868.0/sq mi)
- Time zone: UTC−3 (BRT)
- Website: sapucaiadosul.rs.gov.br

Sapucaia do Sul is a municipality in the state of Rio Grande do Sul, Brazil. It is located in the south of Brazil, in the region of "Vale dos Sinos".

Sapucaia do Sul is a commercial city, and some industries have been there since the 1960s. The city is crossed by BR-116, one of the most important roads in Brazil. The coordinates of this place are -29.829, -51.144. As of 2020, the city has a population of 141,808.

One of its main touristic attractions is the Zoo Park.

== See also ==
- List of municipalities in Rio Grande do Sul
