= Pará de Minas =

- Municipality
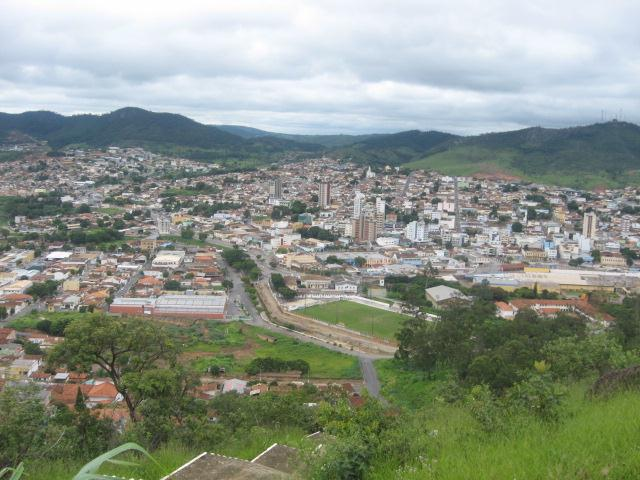
- Aerial view of Pará de Minas

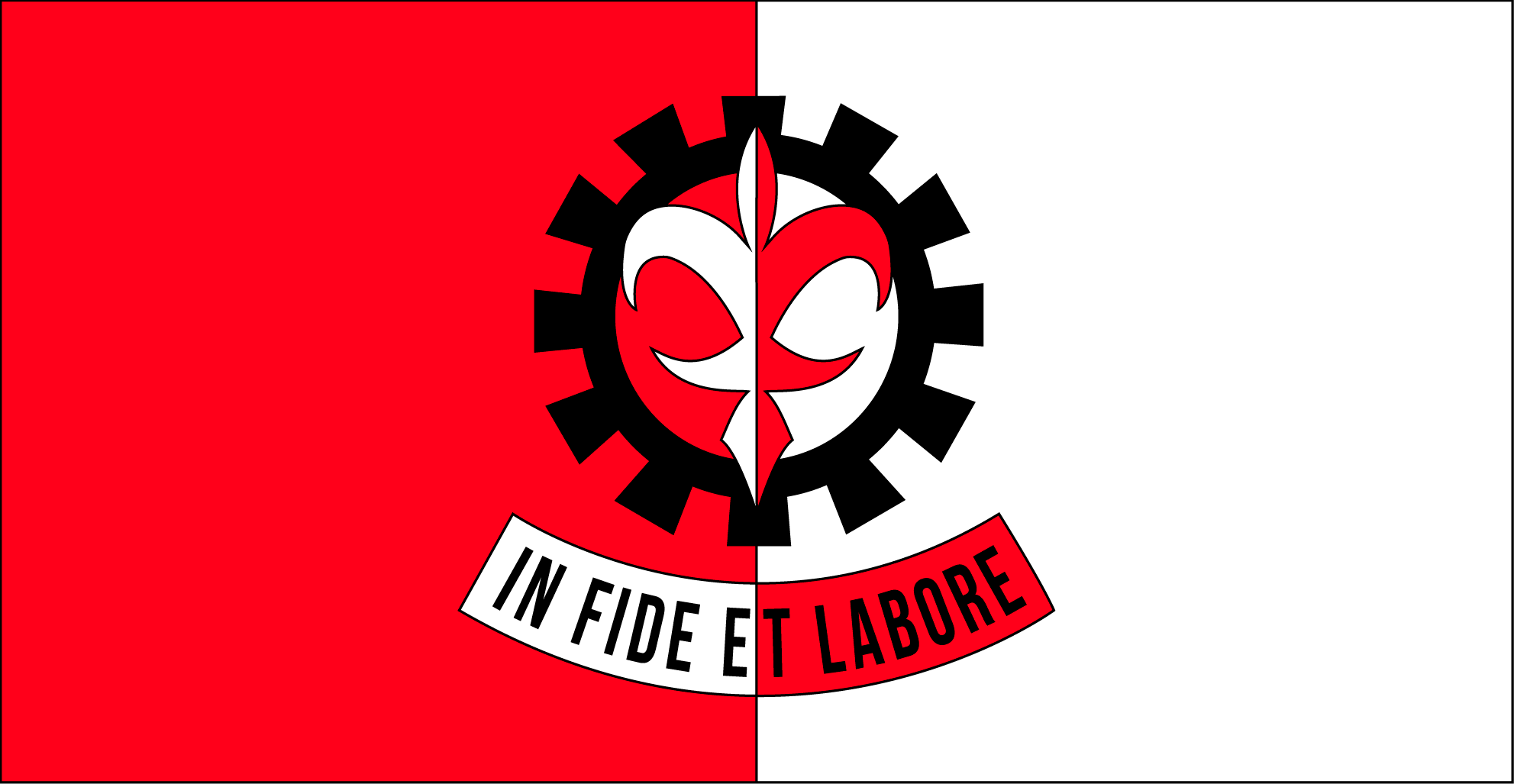
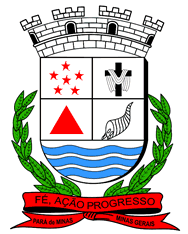
- Flag Coat of arms
- Nickname: Pará
- Motto: Portuguese: Fé, ação, progresso (Faith, Action, Progress)
- Location in Minas Gerais

- Location in Brazil
- Coordinates: 19°51′36″S 44°36′28″W
- Country: Brazil
- Region: Southeast
- State: Minas Gerais
- Neighboring municipalities: Onça de Pitangui, São José da Varginha, Esmeraldas, Florestal, Mateus Leme, Itaúna, Igaratinga, Conceição do Pará
- Distance to capital: 75 km (47 mi)
- Districts: Ascensão, Carioca, Córrego do Barro, Pará de Minas (seat), Tavares de Minas, Torneiros
- Foundation: 20 September 1859
- Emancipation: 9 October 1848 (abolished on 31 May 1850); 8 June 1858 (abolished on 15 July 1872); 23 December 1874

Government
  - Mayor: Inácio Franco (Liberal Party)
  - Term start: 2025
  - Term end: present

Area
  - Total: 551 km^{2} (213 sq mi)
- Elevation: 788 m (2,585 ft)

Population (2022 Census)
  - Total: 97,139
  - Estimate (2025): 102.844
  - Density: 176/km^{2} (457/sq mi)
- Demonym: Paraminense
- Time zone: UTC−3 (BRT)
- Postal code: 35660-000 to 35665-999
- HDI (UNDP/2010): 0.725
- GDP (IBGE/2021): R$4,025,297,487
- GDP per capita (IBGE/2021): R$42,098.58
- Climate: Humid subtropical climate (Cwa)
- Website: parademinas.mg.gov.br

Pará de Minas is a Brazilian municipality located in the state of Minas Gerais, in the Southeast Region of Brazil. It is part of the metropolitan belt of Belo Horizonte and is situated west of the state capital, approximately 75 km (47 mi) away in the Central region of Minas Gerais. The municipality covers an area of 551.247 km^{2} (212.838 sq mi), with 9.9 km^{2} (3.8 sq mi) within the urban area. Its population was estimated at 102,033 inhabitants in 2024.

The municipality's average annual temperature is 21.8 °C (71.2 °F), and its original vegetation is predominantly Atlantic Forest. With 95% of the population residing in the urban area, the city had 50 healthcare facilities in 2009. Its Human Development Index (HDI) is 0.725, classified as high compared to the national average.

The exploration of the area that is now Pará de Minas began in the second half of the 17th century, following the establishment of a rest stop for bandeirantes traveling to and from the mines of Pitangui, some of whom settled in the area. The construction of the Our Lady of Mercy Chapel in the 18th century marks the establishment of the settlement, which developed over decades through subsistence agriculture. It was elevated to district status in 1846 and achieved municipal emancipation in 1859. Throughout the 20th century, the textile industry, steel industry, and agribusiness gained prominence, establishing Pará de Minas as a key regional hub for pig farming and poultry farming.

Events such as the city's carnival (ParáFolia), the Pará de Minas Cavalcade, and the Fest Frango (State Chicken and Pork Fair) are among the main attractions of Pará de Minas, alongside cultural programs at the House of Culture, Cine Café, and the Geraldina Campos de Almeida Municipal Theater. Within the urban area, Bariri Park offers spaces for walking, relaxation, and children's recreation. On the Santa Cruz Ridge, the Christ the Redeemer monument of Pará de Minas, inspired by the Christ the Redeemer in Rio de Janeiro, has become one of the municipality's most iconic landmarks.

== History ==
=== Origins ===
Before the arrival of the first European explorers, most of the territory of present-day Minas Gerais was inhabited by indigenous peoples speaking languages of the Macro-Jê linguistic family. The area of present-day Pará de Minas was likely visited around 1555 by expeditions from Bahia, but significant exploration only began in the late 17th century by Paulista bandeirantes searching for gold and indigenous people to enslave. Notable expeditions included those led by Fernão Dias Pais and Borba Gato, who opened paths along the Pará River.

The discovery of gold in Pitangui led to the opening of a road connecting the mines to São Paulo. Along the Paciência Stream, a rest stop was established for travelers, but the fertile lands prompted some to settle, forming a small community. In 1710, Borba Gato received a large portion of the land from Antônio de Albuquerque Coelho de Carvalho, governor of the then Captaincy of São Paulo and Minas de Ouro, where sesmarias were established. Manuel Batista, nicknamed Pato Fofo, built a chapel dedicated to Our Lady of Mercy, inaugurated on 2 July 1772. Due to his nickname, the place became known as Arraial do Patafofo.

Initially, the local economy revolved around supplying provisions to expeditions heading to the Pitangui mines, and the settlement's growth was tied to the consumer market for agricultural products from the neighboring city. Until the early 19th century, the village consisted mainly of farms producing goods, with much of the economy based on sugarcane derivatives, and small-scale textile industries began to emerge. By 1826, the population was approximately 1,646 residents, when livestock farming was introduced. In 1860, an inventory recorded 165 registered properties, with 36.94% engaged in cattle farming and 36.39% in horse breeding. In January 1885, the first major healthcare facility, the Nossa Senhora da Conceição do Pará Hospital, was inaugurated, and in 1893, the first nighttime lighting system, initially using lamps, was implemented.

=== Administrative development ===
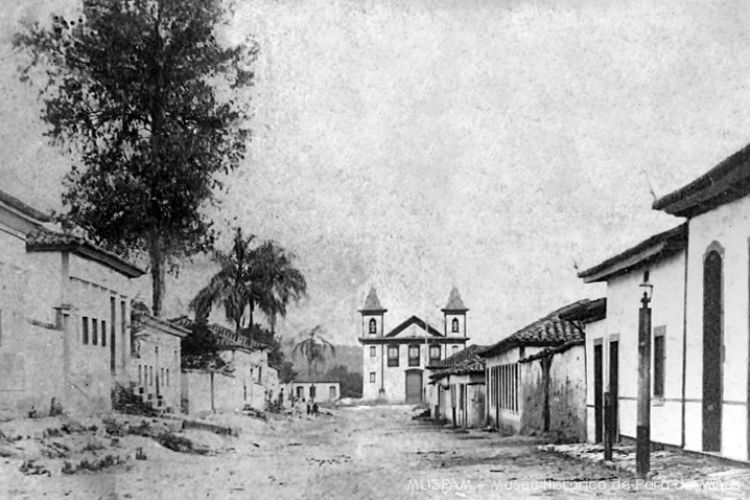
Main street (now Benedito Valadares Street) of Pará de Minas in 1896

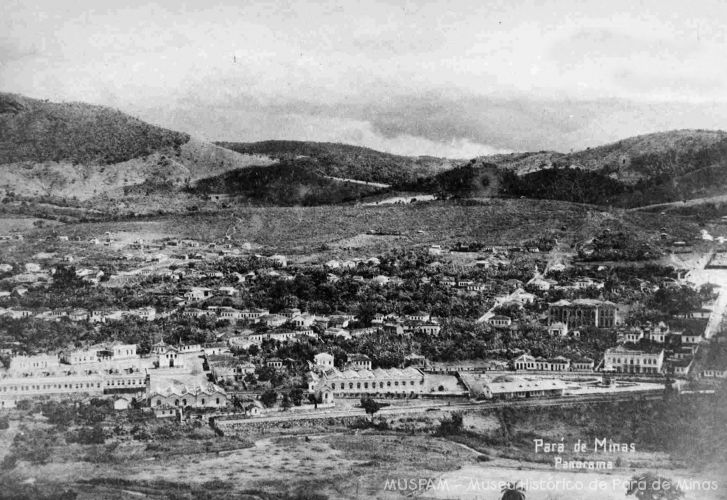
Partial view of Pará de Minas in 1926

Under provincial law no. 312, dated 8 April 1846, the district named Arraial do Patafufo was created, subordinate to the municipality of Pitangui, following the establishment of the parish. Provincial law no. 386, dated 9 October 1848, established the town, which was abolished twice. The first abolition occurred under provincial law no. 472, dated 31 May 1850, and it was reestablished by provincial law no. 882, dated 8 June 1858, officially established on 20 September 1859 as Vila do Pará and the Parish of Our Lady of Mercy of Pará, as per the aforementioned law. Under provincial law no. 1889, dated 15 July 1872, the town was abolished again and annexed to Pitangui as a district, only to be reestablished by provincial law no. 2,081, dated 23 December 1874, and reestablished on 25 March 1875.

The name Pará, meaning a large and fast-flowing river, was changed to Pará de Minas by state law no. 806, dated 22 September 1921, to distinguish it from the state of Pará. Under provincial law no. 2,416, dated 5 November 1877, the town was elevated to city status, and by provincial law no. 3,141, dated 18 October 1883, the districts of Santo Antônio do Rio São João Acima and São Joaquim de Bicas were created. In the following decades, the districts of Mateus Leme, São Gonçalo do Pará, and São José da Varginha (state law no. 2, dated 14 September 1891) and Florestal (state law no. 556, dated 30 August 1911) were established. Santo Antônio do Rio São João Acima was renamed Igaratinga by state law no. 843, dated 7 September 1923, and São Joaquim de Bicas was renamed Igarapé by state law no. 1,002, dated 30 July 1931.

By state decree-law no. 148, dated 17 December 1938, Mateus Leme and Igarapé were separated to form the new municipality of Mateus Leme, and by state law no. 1,039, dated 12 December 1953, the district of Carioca was created from lands detached from Igaratinga. State law no. 2,764, dated 30 December 1962, created the districts of Ascensão and Córrego de Barro, while Florestal, Igaratinga, and São José da Varginha were elevated to municipality status. State law no. 8,285, dated 8 October 1982, established the district of Torneiros. Law no. 4,416, dated 16 September 2004, created the district of Tavares de Minas. Currently, the districts are Ascensão, Carioca, Córrego do Barro, Tavares de Minas, and Torneiros, in addition to the seat district.

=== 20th century and recent history ===
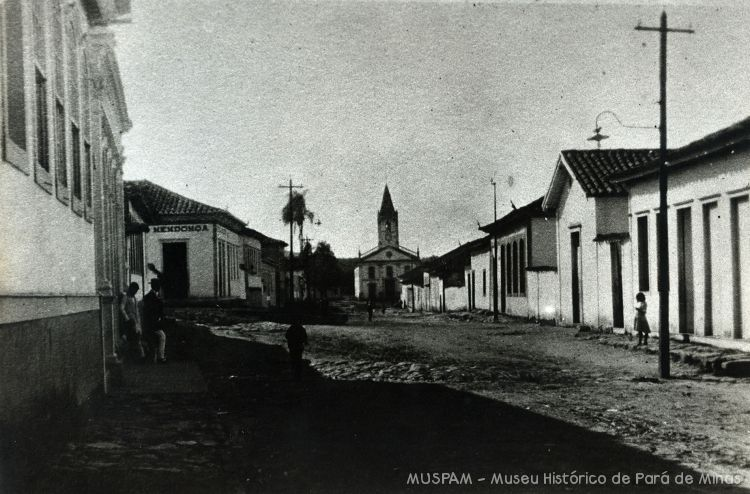
Main street of the city with the Our Lady of Mercy Mother Church in the background, early 20th century

The church around which the settlement emerged was demolished in 1953. A second Mother Church was inaugurated on 1 January 1901 but was demolished on 21 April 1971 to make way for the expansion of Padre José Pereira Coelho Square, popularly known as Matriz Square. On 9 April 1972, a new church, the Our Lady of Mercy Mother Church, was inaugurated. In 1908, the National Paraense Company, the first major textile industry in the municipality, was established and operated using electricity. Early in the 20th century, the Paracatu Railway arrived, and the city's railway station was inaugurated in 1912. Between the 1910s and 1920s, the Torquato de Almeida School—the only school in the area until 1945—the House of Culture, and a new building for the Nossa Senhora da Conceição do Pará Hospital were established, alongside other urban infrastructure developments, including the first electricity distribution network in 1917 and garbage collection services in 1924.

The agribusiness sector gained momentum in 1927 with the opening of the first factory for butter, ice, and pasteurization, strengthened by the Inconfidência Plant of Pará de Minas in 1937, later managed by the Minas Gerais Agricultural Company (CAMIG). In 1949, the first Regional Agroindustrial Exhibition of Pará de Minas was held, and in 1951, the Pará de Minas Spinning and Weaving Company was founded, with the population reaching 28,432 inhabitants by 1955. In 1959, the Alterosa Steelworks, Paraense Steel Plant (Usipa), and Pará de Minas Telephone Company were established, pioneering the extractive and steel sectors in the city.

In 1980, Pará de Minas accounted for approximately 85% of the value of mineral extraction, 61% of industrial production, and 52% of service provision in the west-central region of Minas Gerais. The railway line serving the city was deactivated in 1988, overshadowed by the availability of highways. Agriculture's share in the municipal economy declined, becoming closely tied to agribusiness, which, along with the textile industry, accounted for about 70% of municipal revenue by the early 21st century. The introduction of poultry farming established Pará de Minas as the largest producer in its microregion, alongside improvements in infrastructure and the environment, such as the completion of a sewage treatment plant in 2007.

== Geography ==
According to the Brazilian Institute of Geography and Statistics (IBGE), the municipality's area is 551.247 km^{2} (212.838 sq mi), with 9.9387 km^{2} (3.8374 sq mi) in the urban area and the remaining 541.308 km^{2} (209.000 sq mi) in the rural area. It is located at 19°51'37" south latitude and 44°36'30" west longitude and is 86 km (53 mi) west of the state capital, forming part of the metropolitan belt of Belo Horizonte along with 16 other cities. Its neighboring municipalities are São José da Varginha to the north; Onça de Pitangui to the northeast; Conceição do Pará to the east; Igaratinga to the southwest; Mateus Leme and Itaúna to the south; Florestal to the east; and Esmeraldas to the northeast.

According to the regional division in effect since 2017, established by the IBGE, the municipality belongs to the Intermediate Geographic Region of Divinópolis and the Immediate Geographic Region of Pará de Minas. Previously, under the division into microregions and mesoregions, it was part of the Pará de Minas microregion, which was included in the Metropolitan mesoregion of Belo Horizonte.

=== Topography, geomorphology, and hydrography ===
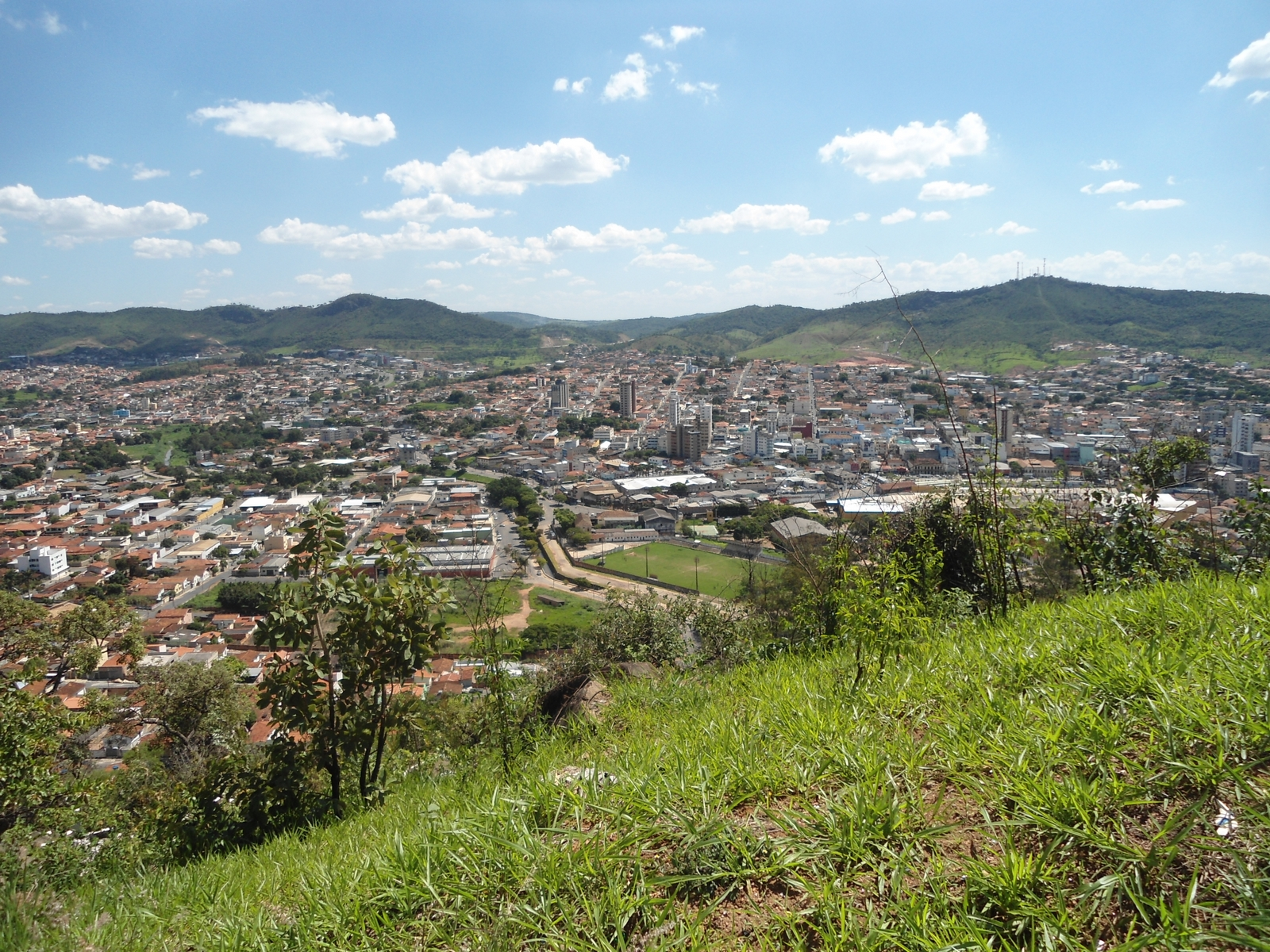
Partial view of Pará de Minas, showcasing its undulating terrain

The terrain of Pará de Minas is predominantly undulating. Approximately 60% of the municipal territory is covered by rolling hills, about 20% consists of mountainous terrain, and the remaining 20% is flat. The highest elevation is at Serra da Piteira, reaching 1,196 m (3,924 ft), while the lowest is at the mouth of the Paciência Stream, at 772 m (2,533 ft), with the city center at 791.93 m (2,598.2 ft). The soil is rich in agalmatolite, quartzite, and flint, with a predominance of gneiss rocks. Along the rivers, the terrain is more sharply rejuvenated, featuring high gneiss escarpments and rocky outcrops.

The drainage network displays a distinct rectangular pattern, with deeply incised watercourses, visible in aerial photographs. Alluvial deposits are significantly repositioned and elevated relative to the watercourses. The mountainous terrain is primarily composed of quartzites and hydrothermalites, which are resistant to weathering, corresponding to the Andaime and Piteira ridges. On the flattened ridge tops, consolidated laterite crusts of Miocene-Pliocene age are observed.

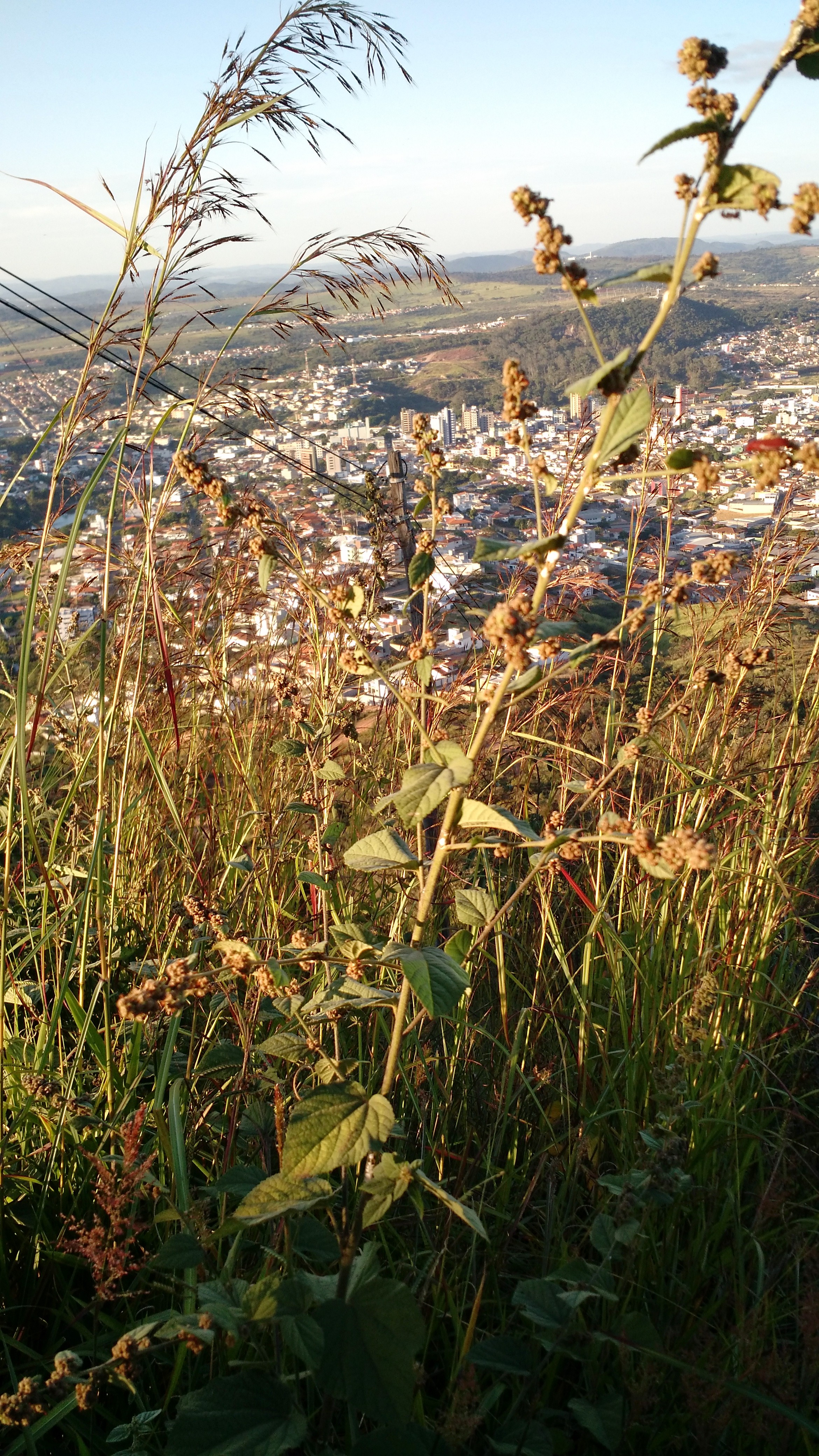
View of the city from the Serra das Torres at 1200 meters

The territory is drained by several small watercourses, primarily the Olhos d'Água and Paciência streams and the Água Limpa creek, which are part of the São Francisco River basin and the Pará River sub-basin. As previously mentioned, the city was established along the Paciência Stream, following the creation of a rest stop for bandeirantes heading to Pitangui, and today it serves as a water supply source for the city. Some sections of the stream suffer from litter, debris, siltation, and water pollution from domestic sewage, although much of its urban course is channelized. However, the city is located in a region with limited water resources, leading to water rationing during prolonged dry periods.

=== Climate ===
The climate of Pará de Minas is classified by the IBGE as monsoon-influenced humid subtropical climate (type Cwa according to the Köppen system), with an average annual temperature of 21.8 °C (71.2 °F), featuring dry and mild winters and rainy summers with high temperatures. The warmest month, February, has an average temperature of 24 °C (75 °F), with an average maximum of 29.8 °C (85.6 °F) and a minimum of 18.3 °C (64.9 °F). The coldest month, June, averages 18.5 °C (65.3 °F), with maximum and minimum averages of 26.2 °C (79.2 °F) and 10.8 °C (51.4 °F), respectively. Autumn and spring are transitional seasons.

The average annual precipitation is 1,374.9 mm (54.13 in), with August being the driest month, receiving only 10.4 mm (0.41 in). December, the wettest month, averages 293.8 mm (11.57 in). In recent years, hot and dry days during winter have become increasingly common, often exceeding 30 °C (86 °F), particularly between July and September. For example, in August 2013, rainfall in the Pará de Minas region was 0 mm (0 in). During the dry season and prolonged Indian summers in the rainy season, wildfires in hills and thickets are common, especially in rural areas, contributing to deforestation and the release of pollutants into the atmosphere, further degrading air quality.

According to the Mineral Resources Research Company (CPRM), between 1941 and 1963, the highest daily rainfall recorded in Pará de Minas was 130.4 mm (5.13 in), observed on 29 February 1960. According to the National Institute for Space Research (INPE), the municipality ranks 516th in lightning occurrences in Minas Gerais, with an annual average of 3.1342 lightning strikes per square kilometer. Hail storms are infrequent, but significant events occurred on 29 October 2011 and 23 January 2014.

Climate data for Pará de Minas
Month	Jan	Feb	Mar	Apr	May	Jun	Jul	Aug	Sep	Oct	Nov	Dec	Year
Mean daily maximum °C (°F)	29.3 (84.7)	29.8 (85.6)	29.8 (85.6)	28.7 (83.7)	27.1 (80.8)	26.2 (79.2)	27 (81)	28.2 (82.8)	28.8 (83.8)	29.5 (85.1)	28.9 (84.0)	28.5 (83.3)	28.4 (83.1)
Mean daily minimum °C (°F)	18.3 (64.9)	18.3 (64.9)	17.7 (63.9)	15.8 (60.4)	13 (55)	10.8 (51.4)	10.2 (50.4)	12.9 (55.2)	14.5 (58.1)	16.7 (62.1)	17.5 (63.5)	18.1 (64.6)	15.3 (59.5)
Average precipitation mm (inches)	269.1 (10.59)	175.2 (6.90)	146.2 (5.76)	59.3 (2.33)	24.5 (0.96)	27.9 (1.10)	10.5 (0.41)	10.4 (0.41)	51.3 (2.02)	115.5 (4.55)	191.9 (7.56)	293.8 (11.57)	1,374.9 (54.13)
Source: Somar Meteorologia

=== Ecology and environment ===
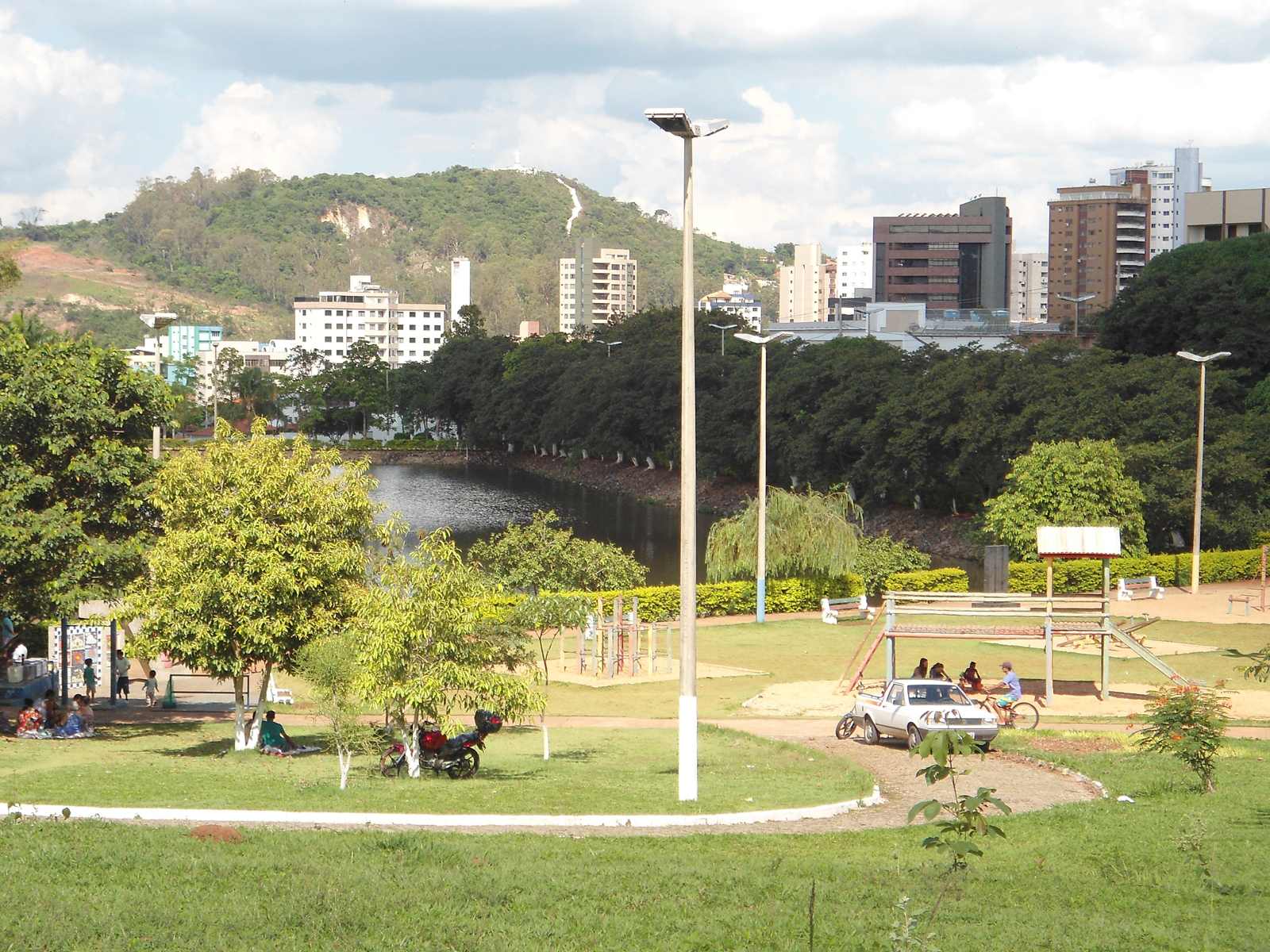
Bariri Park, one of the city's main green spaces

The native vegetation belongs to the Atlantic Forest domain in transition with the Cerrado. In 2011, remaining Atlantic Forest reserves covered 3,662 ha (9,050 acres), or 9.5% of the total municipal area, and in 2009, the Cerrado covered 6,879.13 ha (16,998.7 acres) (12.52% of the municipal area), reforestation with eucalyptus plantations occupied 262.63 ha (649.0 acres) (0.48%), fields covered 312.89 ha (773.2 acres) (0.57%), watercourses covered 162.99 ha (402.8 acres) (0.3%), and urbanized areas spanned 2,197.69 ha (5,430.6 acres) (4.0%). Regarding land use, approximately 4,354 ha (10,760 acres) of Pará de Minas are used for crops, and another 366 ha (900 acres) are used for pastures, primarily for livestock.

Wildfires are a recurring issue throughout the municipality, which occur mainly during dry months when vegetation is more susceptible to fire, affecting air quality already compromised by industrial pollution in the region, and soil quality. During the rainy season, flooding causes significant damage in lower, densely populated areas, and landslides affect residences. These issues are often due to constructions on hillsides and high-risk areas, as well as litter and sewage dumped into streams and rivers, with the city being one of the largest contributors to pollution in the Pará River basin, according to the Minas Gerais Institute for Water Management (IGAM).

Amid reforested and deforested areas, some biodiversity remains in undisturbed patches, such as the ecological preservation area (EPA) between Pará de Minas and Florestal. The Santa Cruz Ridge, located near the urban area, hosts the Christ the Redeemer monument, established in 1963, marking the environmental heritage site. The city occasionally undertakes tree planting projects in main squares, streets, and avenues to mitigate environmental pollution impacts.

== Demography ==
Historical population
Year	Pop.	±%
1970	30,995	—
1980	44,358	+43.1%
1991	61,193	+38.0%
2000	73,007	+19.3%
2010	84,215	+15.4%
2022 (est.)	97,139	+15.3%
Source: Brazilian Institute of Geography and Statistics (IBGE)

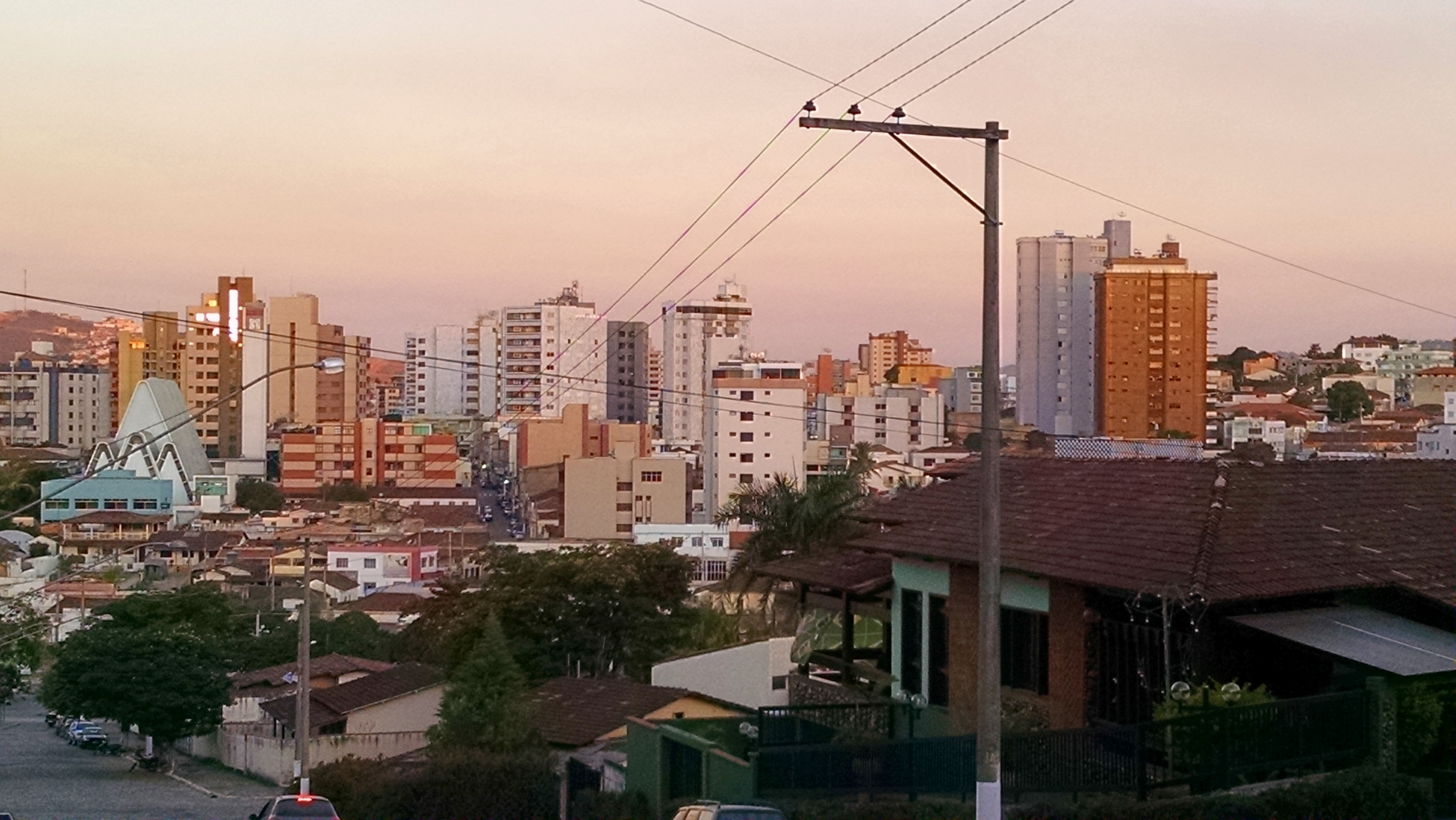
View of the city from the top of São José neighborhood

In 2010, the population of the municipality was recorded by the Brazilian Institute of Geography and Statistics (IBGE) as 84,215 inhabitants. According to the 2010 census, 41,639 inhabitants were male, and 42,576 were female. The same census reported 79,599 inhabitants living in the urban area and 4,616 in the rural area. According to the 2022 census, the municipal population was 97,139 inhabitants.

Of the total population in 2010, 18,870 inhabitants (22.41%) were under 15 years old, 59,259 inhabitants (70.34%) were aged 15 to 64, and 6,086 people (7.23%) were over 65, with a life expectancy at birth of 75.9 years and a total fertility rate of 1.6 children per woman. The IBGE classifies Pará de Minas as an A zone center, meaning the city exerts significant influence over nearby municipalities, including Igaratinga, Maravilhas, Onça de Pitangui, Pequi, and São José da Varginha.

=== Poverty, development, and inequality ===
From 2000 to 2010, the proportion of people with a per capita household income of up to half the minimum wage decreased by 70.6%. In 2010, 96% of the population lived above the poverty line, 3.3% were at the poverty line, and 0.7% were below it. The Gini coefficient, which measures social inequality, was 0.435, where 1.00 is the worst and 0.00 is the best. The wealthiest 20% of the population accounted for 49.5% of the city's total income, 8.7 times higher than the 5.7% share of the poorest 20%. According to the IBGE, in 2010, the only subnormal agglomeration in Pará de Minas was Vila Nossa Senhora Aparecida, also known as Morro Santa Cruz, located at the city's entrance along BR-262, with 638 residents in 174 permanent private households.

The Human Development Index (HDI-M) of Pará de Minas is considered high by the United Nations Development Programme (UNDP), with a value of 0.725 (the 1154th highest in Brazil). The city has most indicators at or above the national average, according to the UNDP. The education index is 0.628, the longevity index is 0.848, and the income index is 0.715. The city ranks 45th among the most developed municipalities in Brazil, according to the Getulio Vargas Foundation (FGV) in 2012, considering education, health, income, and safety.

=== Religion ===
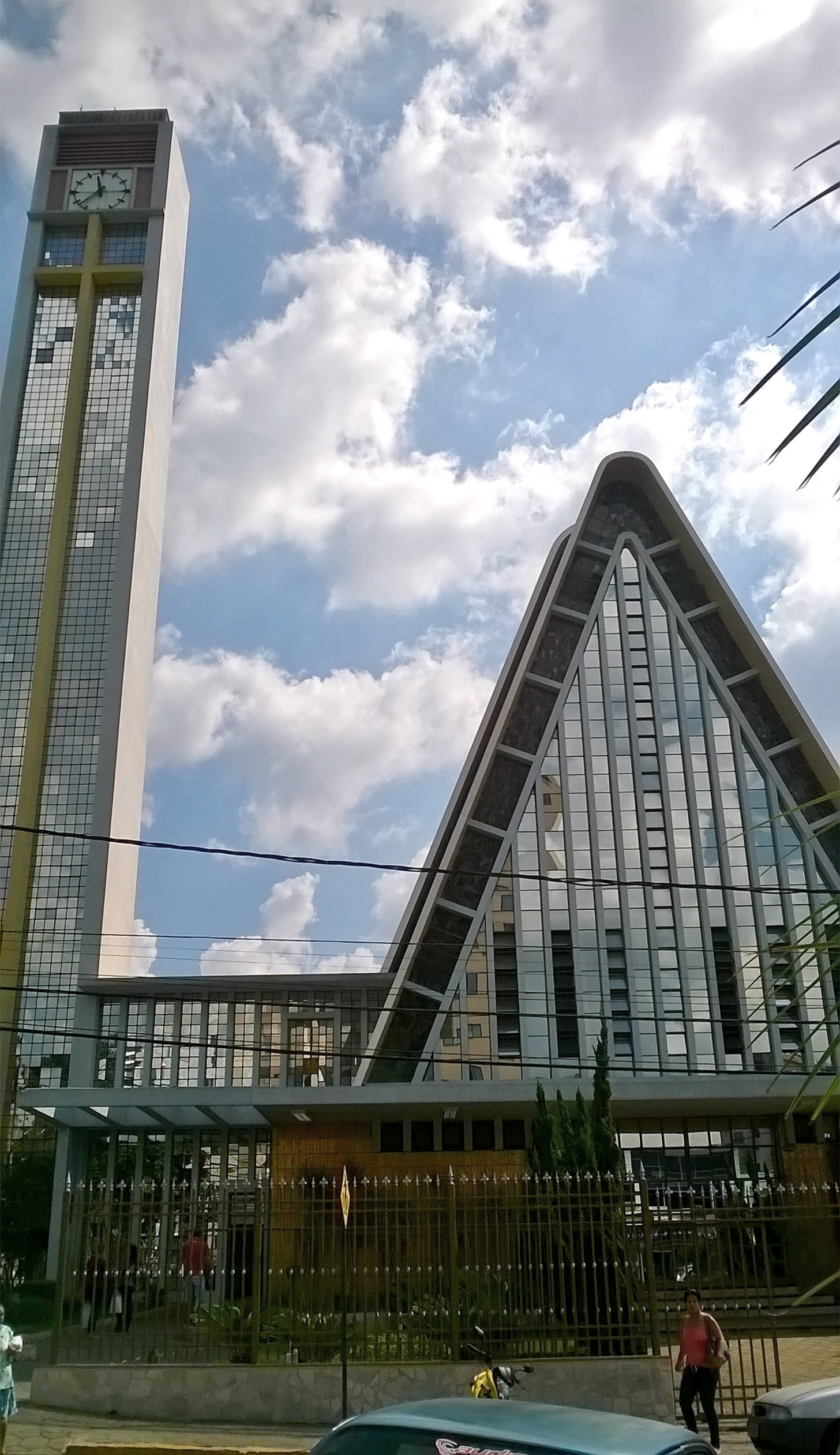
Façade of the Our Lady of Mercy Mother Church

The majority of Pará de Minas residents identify as Catholic, though the city is home to dozens of different Protestant denominations, as well as practitioners of Buddhism, Spiritism, and other faiths. There are also notable Jewish, Mormon, and Afro-Brazilian religious communities. According to the 2010 IBGE census, the population of Pará de Minas comprises 70,526 Catholics (83.74%), 9,004 evangelicals (10.69%), 1,759 people with no religion (2.09%), 757 Spiritists (0.9%), 47 Buddhists (0.06%), and the remaining 2.52% are divided among other religions.

==== Roman Catholic Church ====
Catholicism has been present in Pará de Minas since the first settlers arrived, with the construction of the Our Lady of Mercy Chapel in the early 18th century, ordered by Manuel Batista, also known as Pato Fofo, marking the establishment of the settlement that was formalized as a district with the creation of the parish on 8 April 1846. According to the current division by the Catholic Church, the municipality is part of the Diocese of Divinópolis, created on 11 July 1958, which, as of May 2014, included 53 parishes across 25 cities, six of which were in Pará de Minas: Our Lady of Mercy, Our Lady Help of Christians, Saint Anthony, Saint Francis of Assisi, Our Lady of the Immaculate Conception, and Saint Peter.

The parishes of Pará de Minas are under the Deanery of Our Lady of Mercy, which also includes the municipalities of Florestal, Igaratinga, and São José da Varginha. The Our Lady of Mercy Chapel was replaced by the Our Lady of Mercy Mother Church in 1901, which was demolished 20 years later and replaced by a new temple in 1972. Since then, the current Our Lady of Mercy Mother Church has been one of the city's main architectural landmarks.

==== Protestant Churches ====
The city is home to a variety of Protestant or Reformed denominations, including the Christian Congregation in Brazil, Maranatha Christian Church, Foursquare Church, Presbyterian Church, Methodist Church, Anglican Episcopal Church, Baptist churches, Assemblies of God, Seventh-day Adventist Church, Blessing Cathedral, Universal Church of the Kingdom of God, International Grace of God Church, God Is Love Pentecostal Church, Brazil for Christ Pentecostal Church, among others. Among Protestant groups, 5.61% of the population follows Pentecostal evangelical churches, 1.76% mission-based evangelical churches, and 3.33% non-specific evangelical churches.

There are also Christians from other Reformed denominations, such as Jehovah's Witnesses (representing 1.20% of residents) and members of the Church of Jesus Christ of Latter-day Saints (0.02% of the population).

=== Ethnicity and migration ===
The first settlers in what was then Arraial do Patafofo, during the 18th century, were mostly bandeirantes from the state of São Paulo. However, the customs and social organization at the time reflected African and Portuguese influences from the colonial period. For instance, women were typically dedicated to household tasks and, later, small commercial activities, while men handled agricultural work. The city saw a significant influx of immigrants during the 20th century, drawn by its development, including Chinese, Japanese, American, German, Portuguese, Spanish, and Argentine communities.

In 2010, the population of Pará de Minas was composed of 46,168 whites (54.82%), 4,954 blacks (5.88%), 855 Asians (1.02%), 32,200 mixed-race (38.24%), 37 indigenous (0.04%), and one undeclared. Regarding region of birth, 82,372 were born in the Southeast (97.81%), 147 in the North (0.17%), 776 in the Northeast (0.92%), 333 in the Central-West (0.40%), and 134 in the South (0.16%). 81,226 inhabitants were born in Minas Gerais (96.45%), of which 57,183 were born in Pará de Minas (67.90%). Among the 2,989 residents born in other states, São Paulo had the highest representation with 805 people (0.96%), followed by Bahia with 424 residents (0.50%), and Rio de Janeiro with 178 residents (0.21%).

== Politics and administration ==
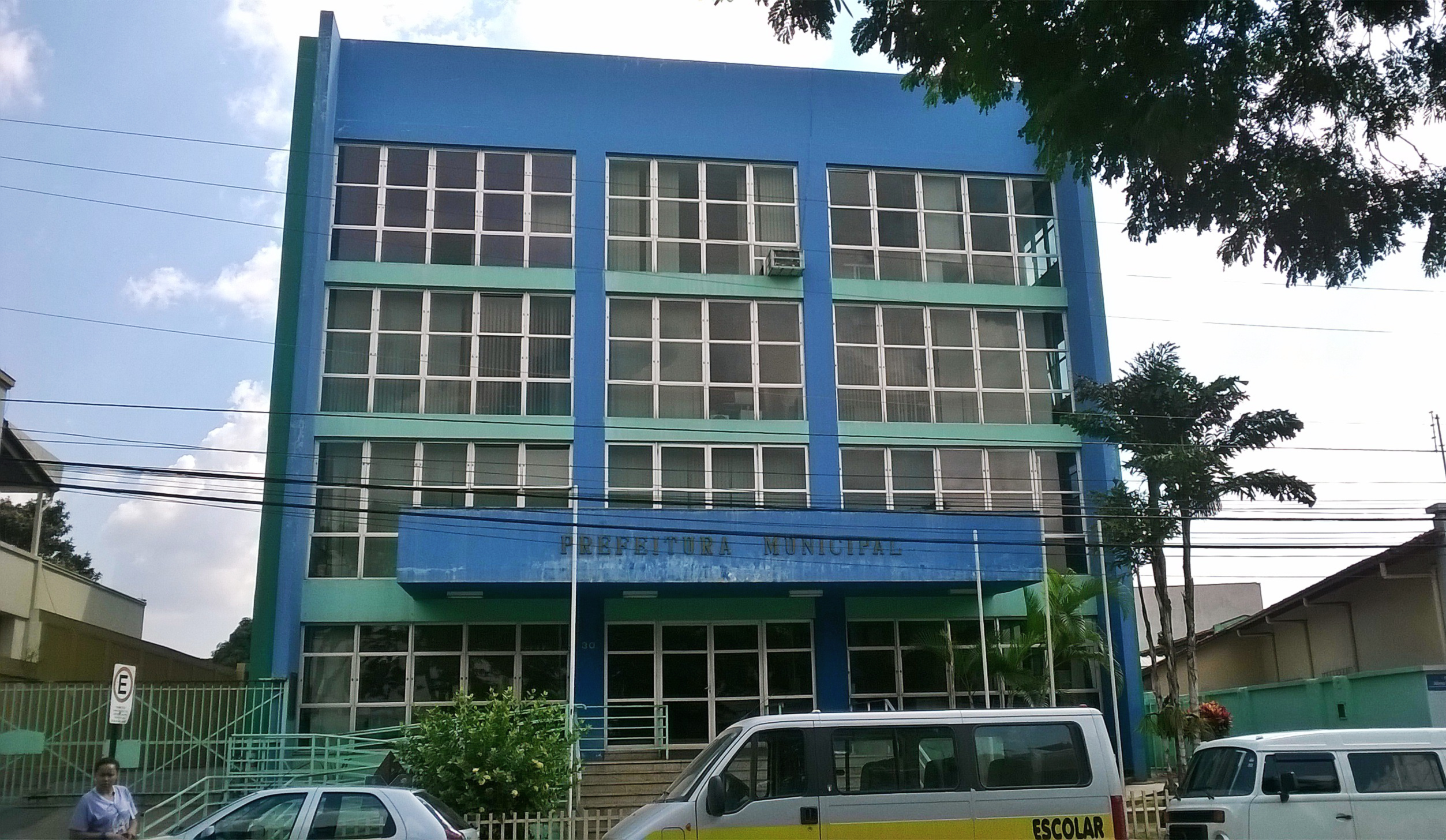
Pará de Minas City Hall

Municipal administration is carried out by the Executive and Legislative branches. The Executive is led by the mayor, supported by a cabinet of secretaries. The current mayor is Inácio Franco of the Liberal Party (PL), elected in the 2024 municipal elections with 60.05% of valid votes and sworn in on 1 January 2025, alongside Luiz Lima as vice-mayor. The Legislative branch consists of the municipal chamber, composed of 17 councilors. The current President of the Chamber of Councilors is Délio Alves. The chamber is responsible for drafting and voting on fundamental laws for administration and the Executive, particularly the participatory budget (Budget Guidelines Law). Among notable figures from Pará de Minas in state and national politics is Benedito Valadares, who served as a federal deputy, senator, and governor of Minas Gerais.

In addition to the Legislative process and the work of the secretariats, several municipal councils are active, including those for children's and adolescents' rights (created in 1992), guardianship (2009), elderly rights (2004), persons with disabilities (2011), and women's policies (2010). Pará de Minas is governed by its organic law, enacted on 21 March 1990, and hosts a comarca of the state judiciary, of second grade, covering the municipalities of Florestal, Igaratinga, Onça de Pitangui, Pequi, São Gonçalo do Pará, and São José da Varginha. As of October 2024, the municipality had 67,600 voters, according to the Superior Electoral Court (TSE), representing 0.391% of the Minas Gerais electorate.

== Economy ==
In the Gross Domestic Product (GDP) of Pará de Minas, agriculture, linked to agribusiness, and the service sector stand out. According to 2021 IBGE data, the municipal GDP was R$4,025,297,487, ranking as the 31st largest GDP in the state. In 2021, R$637,159,835 were from taxes on products net of subsidies at current prices, and the per capita GDP was R$42,098.58. In 2010, 71.91% of the population over 18 was economically active, with an unemployment rate of 4.49%.

Wages and other remunerations totaled R$311,687,000, with an average monthly wage of 2.0 minimum wages. There were 3,047 local units and 2,939 active companies. According to the IBGE, 55.49% of households survived on less than one minimum wage per month per resident (14,138 households), 35.90% had one to three minimum wages per person (9,141 households), 4.48% earned three to five wages (1,142 households), 2.83% had incomes above five minimum wages (720 households), and 1.31% had no income (334 households).

=== Primary sector ===
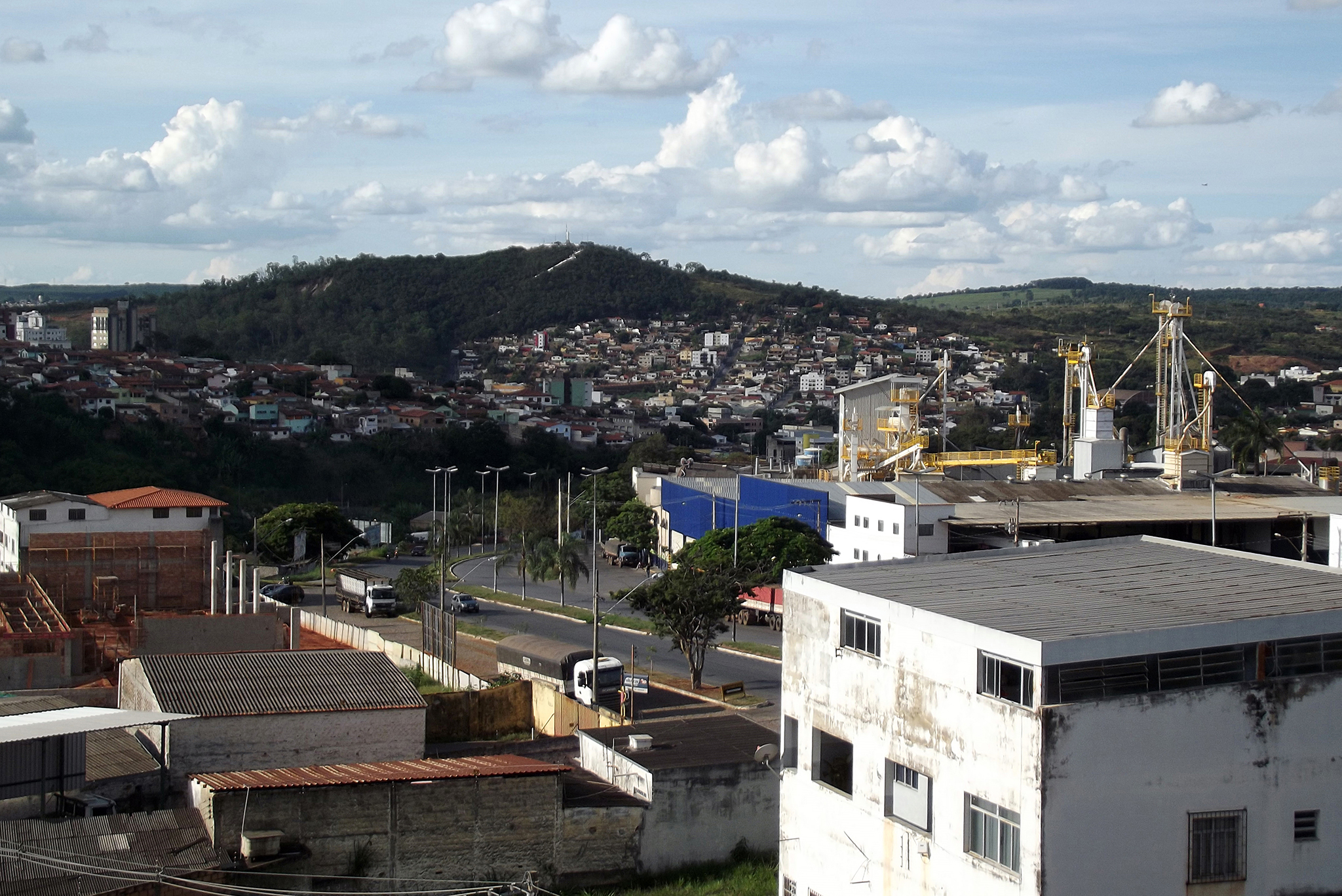
Ovídio de Abreu Avenue and the Guabi complex (an agribusiness company), with the city in the background.

In 2021, the gross value added from agriculture and livestock to the city's GDP was R$128,982,280. In 2010, 8.08% of the municipality's economically active population was employed in this sector. According to the Brazilian Institute of Geography and Statistics (IBGE), in 2012, the municipality had a livestock inventory consisting of 44,496 cattle, 605 buffalo, 14 donkeys, 134 goats, 1,386 horses, 117 mules, 242 sheep, 123,958 pigs, and 12,740,806 poultry, including 220,136 hens and 12,520,670 roosters, broilers, and chicks. In the same year, the city produced 19,189,000 litres of milk from 10,149 cows and 2,750,000 dozen eggs from hens. Pará de Minas is recognized as a regional hub for agriculture, pig farming, and poultry farming. Occasionally, the Francisco Olivé Diniz Exhibition Park hosts local and statewide events to promote agricultural production, with the largest being the Fest Frango (State Chicken and Pig Fair). Livestock farming has been a cornerstone of the local economy since the 19th century and gained prominence in the 20th century with the establishment of the first agro-industries and cooperatives. Poultry farming was introduced in the 1970s, followed by pig farming in the 1990s, both of which saw significant growth at the start of the 2000s.

In temporary crop production, the main products are sugarcane (6,400 tonnes produced across 80 hectares), tomatoes (3,290 tonnes across 47 hectares), and cassava (2,175 tonnes across 145 hectares), in addition to garlic, peanuts, rice, sweet potato, beans, and maize. In permanent crop production, notable outputs include bananas (360 tonnes across 24 hectares), oranges (187 tonnes across 45 hectares), and latex (160 tonnes across 80 hectares), alongside smaller-scale production of coffee and passion fruit. Coffee cultivation was introduced in the 1970s by Frenchman George Collin, who achieved successive harvests, though much of his land was later converted into a rubber plantation. In the 1910s, there was an attempt to establish Pará de Minas as a major latex producer, but the endeavor was largely unsuccessful. Sugarcane, maize, and rice have been cultivated since the 19th century, primarily for subsistence farming. However, cotton was the first crop grown on a large scale to meet the demands of the textile industry. The decline of textile factories, replaced by agro-industries, and the rise of polyester production from petroleum led to the end of the cotton cycle in the city.

=== Secondary sector ===
In 2021, R$1,134,222,022 of the municipal GDP came from the gross value added by industry (secondary sector). Much of the city's industrial output is tied to agribusiness and agro-industries, a sector present since the early 20th century, initially linked to livestock farming and later bolstered by the introduction of pig and poultry farming. The textile industry was the first to gain prominence in Pará de Minas, emerging in the 1900s and serving as the municipality's primary source of income until agro-industries became dominant. In the 1950s, industries producing pig iron, foundry products, and ceramics were introduced, reaching their peak in the 1980s. Notably, Alterosa Steel Mill, one of Brazil's largest pig iron producers, operates two industrial units in the municipality. The Western Minas Farmers' Cooperative (COGRAN), established in 1980, had 240 members by March 2014, producing an average of about 3 million poultry birds per month in Pará de Minas alone, and 12 million when including neighboring municipalities.

A significant portion of Pará de Minas' secondary sector output originates from its two industrial districts. The first spans 247,379.00 m^{2} and is divided into 70 plots, hosting approximately 45 operational companies. The second, covering 62,657.00 m^{2} and subdivided into 12 plots, is located along the BR-262 highway and includes a complex belonging to Itambé Laticínios. In 2012, according to IBGE, 8,517 m^{3} of timber was extracted for firewood. In 2010, statistics showed that 0.47% of Pará de Minas' workforce was employed in the extractive industry, while 20.43% worked in manufacturing.

=== Tertiary sector ===
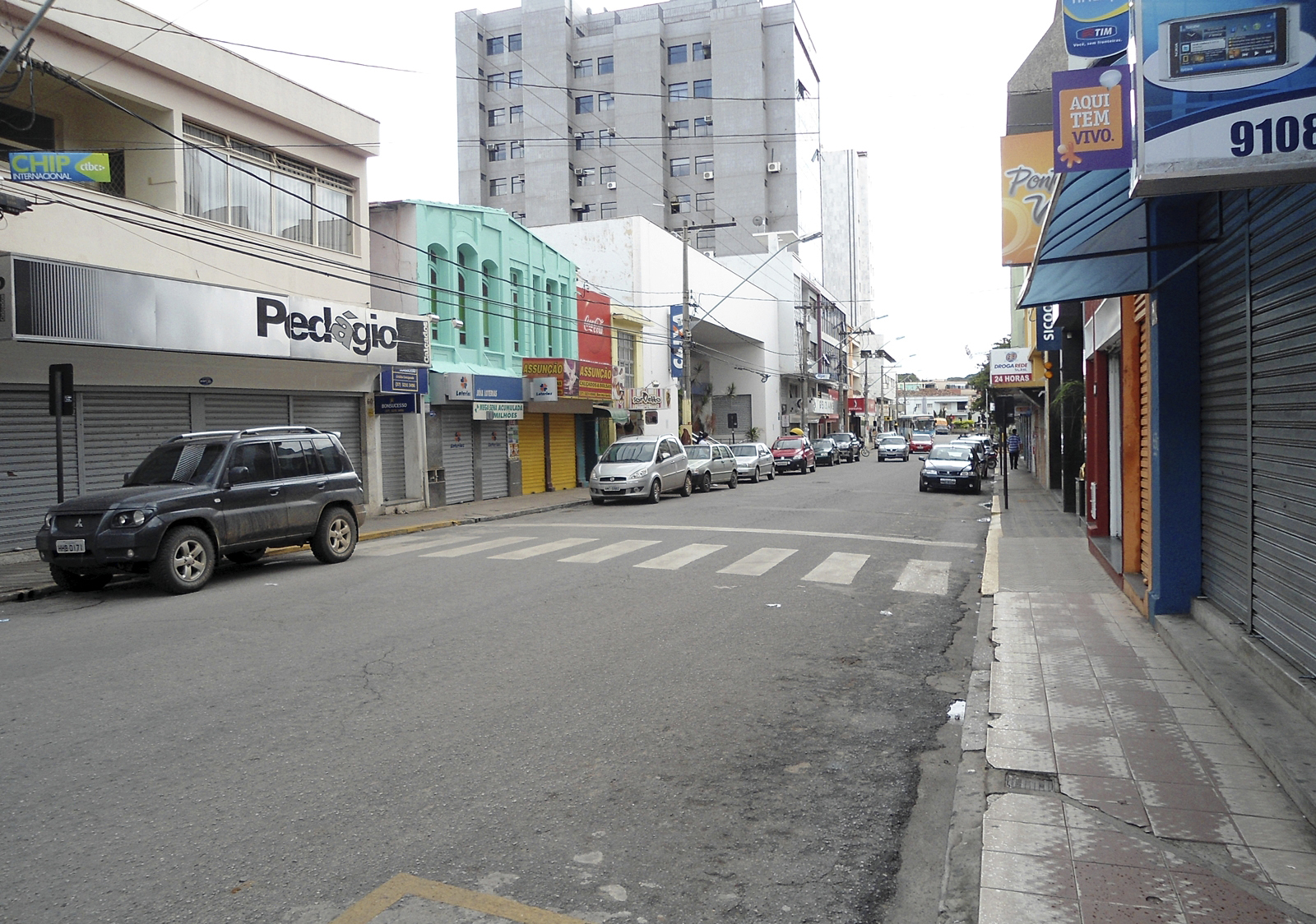
Commercial establishments and a Caixa branch on Benedito Valadares Street

In 2010, 8.55% of the employed population worked in construction, 0.79% in public utilities, 16.32% in commerce, and 38.79% in services. In 2011, R$883,756 of the municipal GDP was attributed to the gross value added by the tertiary sector. A significant portion of this value comes from commerce, with sectors including clothing stores, shoe shops, supermarkets, bakeries, butcher shops, pharmacies, florists, furniture stores, electronics shops, and banks. The São Francisco Commercial Center is one of the region's main hubs for popular commerce and the largest outside the city center, located in the São Francisco neighborhood and inaugurated on 17 September 2005.

The city center is a major commercial hub in the region. In addition to large stores such as Hering Store, and Lojas Americanas, it hosts small and medium-sized businesses based in the municipality or region. As in the rest of the country, the peak sales period is Christmas. The Pará de Minas Business Association (ASCIPAM) represents the industrial and commercial sectors of the city. According to IBGE, in 2012, six financial institution branches operated in Pará de Minas.

Pará de Minas has one shopping mall, Fabrika Mall, which houses major stores such as Bob's and O Boticário.

== Infrastructure ==
=== Healthcare ===
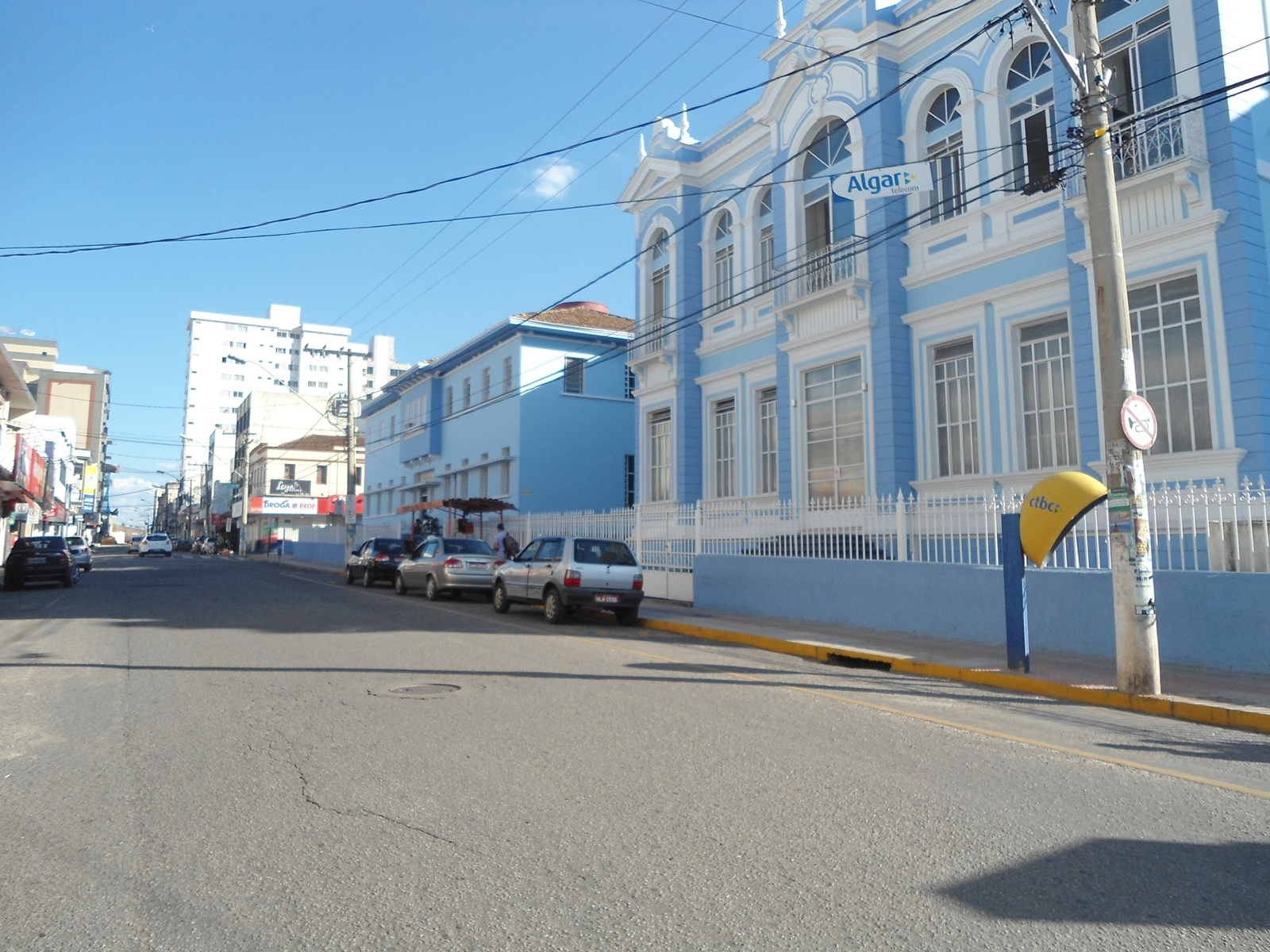
The facade of the Our Lady of Conception Hospital.

In 2009, Pará de Minas had 50 healthcare facilities, with 25 private and 25 municipal public institutions, including hospitals, emergency departments, health centers, and dentistry services. These facilities provided 121 hospitalization beds. In 2012, 98.9% of children under one year of age had up-to-date vaccination records. In 2011, 1,109 live births were recorded, with an infant mortality rate of nine deaths per 1,000 live births for children under five. In 2010, 5.43% of women aged 10 to 17 had children, with 0.23% of them aged 10 to 14, and the activity rate in this age group was 4.95%. In 2012, 90.2% of children under two were weighed by the Family Health Program, with 0.4% found to be malnourished.

The Municipal Health Department, directly linked to the city government, oversees the maintenance and operation of the Unified Health System (SUS) and develops policies, programs, and projects to promote municipal health. Key services include the Family Health Program (PSF), Primary Healthcare Units (UBS), Urgent Care Units (UPAs), and the Mobile Emergency Care Service (SAMU). Additional services include the zoonosis control center, responsible for managing animal-transmitted diseases, and the health surveillance division, which includes epidemiological and sanitary surveillance sections. The Our Lady of Conception Hospital, the city's oldest and main hospital, was founded in 1885, rebuilt in a new building in 1915, and reinaugurated in 1929.

=== Education ===
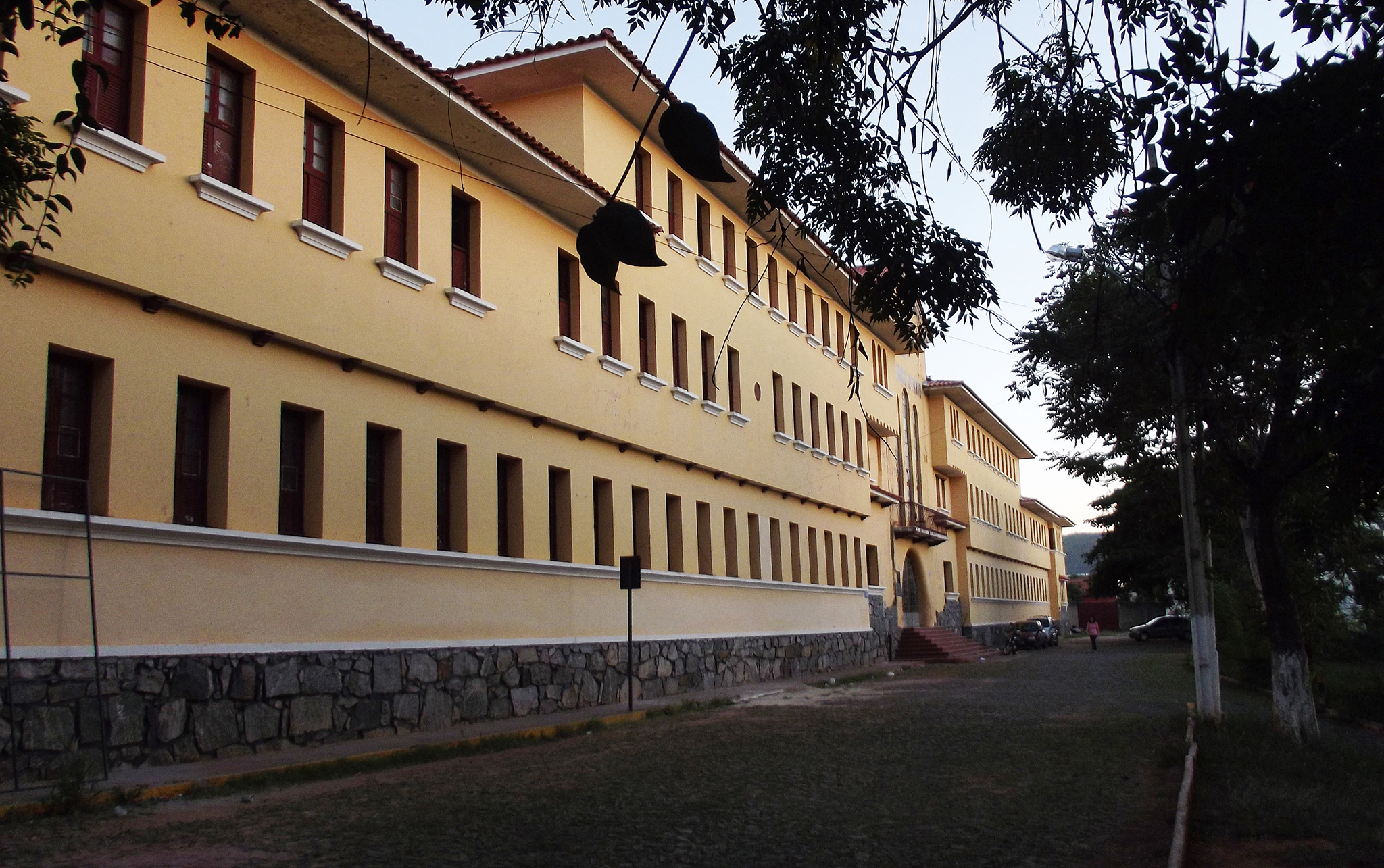
Fernando Otávio State School, considered the best public school in the city based on IDEB results.

In education, the average Basic Education Development Index (IDEB) score for public schools in Pará de Minas in 2011 was 5.3 (on a scale from 1 to 10). Fifth-grade students scored 6.4, while ninth-grade students scored 4.3, compared to a national public school average of 4.0. In 2010, 0.93% of children aged 7 to 14 were not enrolled in primary education. The completion rate for youths aged 15 to 17 was 38.9%, and the literacy rate for youths and adolescents aged 18 to 24 was 99.2%. The age-grade distortion rate in primary education—students older than the recommended age—was 6.7% for early years and 27.6% for later years, while in secondary education, it reached 32.2%. Among residents aged 18 or older, 50.46% had completed primary education, 31.78% had completed secondary education, and the population had an average of 9.38 expected years of schooling.

In 2010, according to census sample data, 25,348 residents attended daycares and/or schools. Of these, 926 were in daycare, 2,487 in preschool, 1,868 in literacy classes, 427 in adult literacy programs, 11,382 in primary education, 3,848 in secondary education, 942 in adult primary education, 993 in adult secondary education, 137 in higher education specialization, 2,321 in undergraduate programs, six in master’s degree programs, and 12 in doctorate programs. A total of 58,867 people did not attend educational institutions, with 5,017 never having attended and 53,850 having attended at some point. In 2012, the city recorded 18,218 enrollments in educational institutions, with 39 primary schools (17 state, 17 municipal, and five private) and 13 secondary schools (10 state and three private).

The Municipal Education Department aims to coordinate and provide administrative and pedagogical support to the Pará de Minas school system. Programs include the Education for Youth and Adults (EJA), a free education network for adults who have not completed primary education, and the Association of Parents and Friends of the Exceptional (APAE), where students with physical disabilities are taught by specialized teachers. For higher education, the city hosts campuses of the Faculdade de Pará de Minas (FAPAM) and the Universidade Vale do Rio Verde (UninCor).

Education in Pará de Minas in numbers (2012)
Level	Enrollments	Teachers	Schools (Total)
Early childhood education	2,195	106	24
Primary education	12,443	688	39
Secondary education	3,580	247	13

=== Public safety and crime ===
Public safety in Pará de Minas is managed by several organizations. The Municipal Civil Defense Coordination Office (COMDEC) handles preventive, assistance, recovery, and rescue actions in public risk situations. The Military Police, a state force, is responsible for ostensive policing, bank, environmental, prison, school, and event security, as well as community engagement initiatives. Pará de Minas is home to the 19th Independent Military Police Company. The Civil Police focuses on investigating and addressing crimes and infractions.

State and municipal authorities have undertaken various efforts to improve city safety, such as expanding and modernizing the fleet of police vehicles. However, challenges persist, with crimes such as theft, armed robbery, and drug trafficking remaining prevalent in various parts of the city, alongside a rising homicide rate. In 2011, the homicide rate was 10.6 deaths per 100,000 inhabitants, ranking 109th in the state and 1,152nd nationally. The traffic accident mortality rate was 18.8 per 100,000 inhabitants, placing 96th in the state and 889th nationally. Between 2006 and 2008, the suicide rate was 7.2 per 100,000 inhabitants, ranking 211th in the state and 2,040th nationally.

=== Housing and services ===
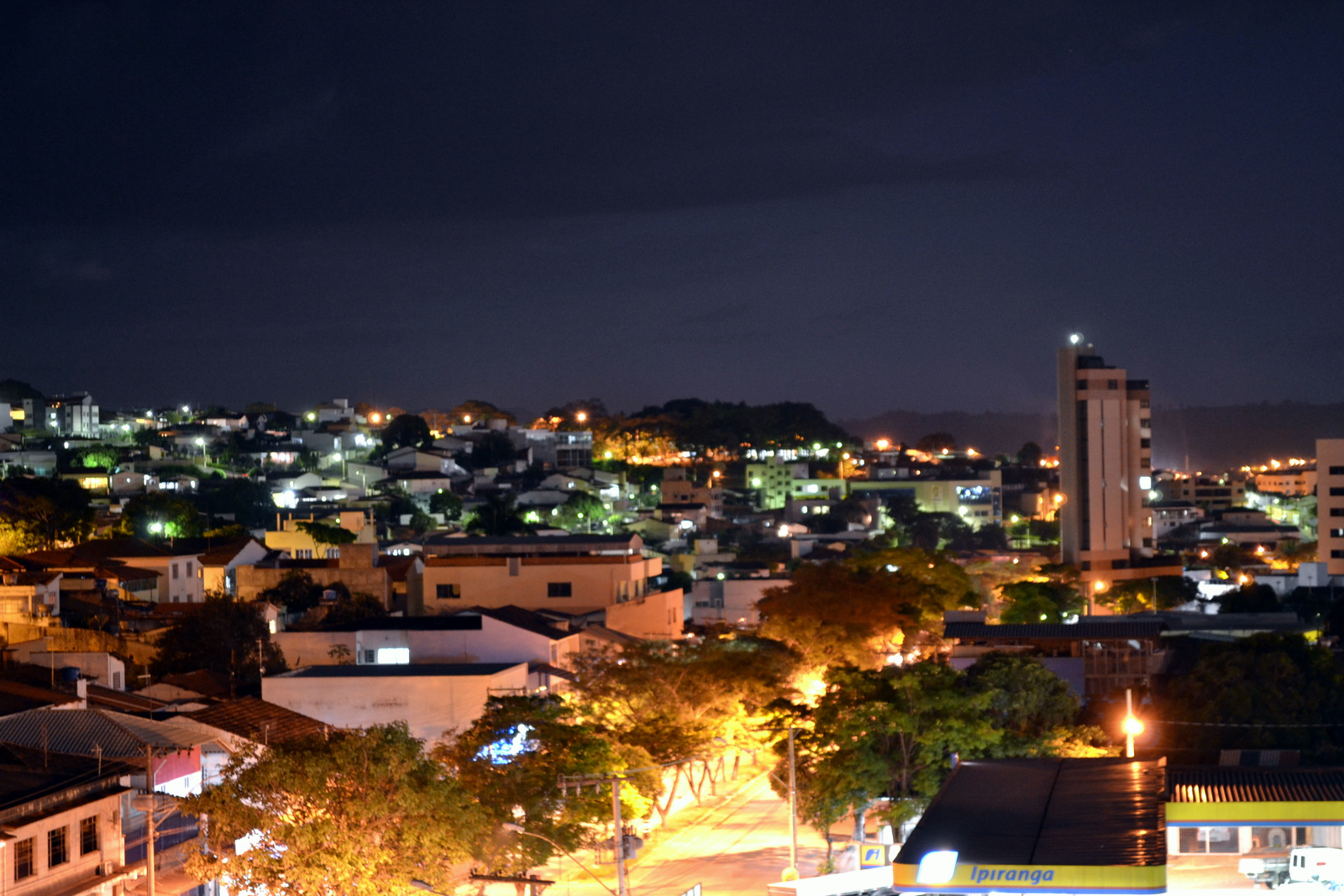
Partial nighttime view of the city, with electricity supplied by Cemig.

In 2010, Pará de Minas had 25,480 households, including 24,214 houses, 48 houses in villages or condominiums, 1,187 apartments, and 31 tenement or slum dwellings. Of the total households, 19,137 were owned, with 17,193 fully paid and 1,944 under acquisition; 4,746 were rented; 1,542 were loaned, with 563 provided by employers and 979 through other means; and 55 were occupied in other ways. Electricity is supplied by Cemig, which serves much of Minas Gerais. In 2003, there were 27,365 consumers, with 184,629,129 kWh of energy consumed. In 2010, according to IBGE, 25,459 households (99.91% of the total) had access to the electrical network.

Water supply and sewage collection are managed by Águas de Pará de Minas, a subsidiary of Águas do Brasil. In 2008, there were 24,968 consumer units, with an average of 15,160 m^{3} of treated water distributed daily. The contract with the Minas Gerais Sanitation Company (Copasa), the former service provider, expired in October 2009. Due to prolonged droughts, the city faced water rationing between 2013 and 2014. The concessionaire had warned of water scarcity issues since the 1990s, and a preliminary project to draw water from the Paraopeba River at Córrego do Barro was proposed, but the contract renewal was rejected by the municipal administration in December 2012. In 2014, a state of public emergency was declared due to worsening water shortages, prompting Mayor Antônio Júlio de Faria to hire Seremco, a company from Curitiba, to identify the best water extraction point. On 13 May 2014, the Municipal Sanitation Plan was approved. The water shortage led to the cancellation of traditional events, such as the 2014 Chicken and Pig Festival, resulting in an estimated loss of R$2 million in revenue and 100,000 tourists. Consequently, the municipal government opened a bidding process for water service providers to submit investment projects. Three companies participated in the bidding, and in February 2015, the city announced that Águas do Brasil, part of the Queiroz Galvão group, won the contract for 35 years.

According to IBGE, in 2010, 23,687 households (92.96% of the total) were connected to the water supply network. Most of the water distributed to the population comes from the Paciência stream, which is treated at the city's water treatment plant and distributed directly to lower and nearby areas. For peripheral and higher areas, several boosters and elevated reservoirs have been installed. Additional water extraction points exist at the Paivas stream and between the Paiol and Militão streams, near the MG-431 highway. Depollution and canalization works on the Paciência stream, started in 2001, were completed in 2009. According to IBGE, 25,403 households (99.69% of the total) had exclusive-use bathrooms. Copasa's sewage collection service covers over 93% of the population, with collected waste treated at a station opened in 2007 and discharged into the Paciência stream. In the municipality's districts and villages such as Trindade, Matinha, Caetano Preto, Córrego das Pedras, and Meireles, smaller treatment plants are managed by the city government. Domestic waste is collected daily and sent to the municipal landfill, officially opened on 2 April 2012, receiving an average of 80 tonnes daily in August 2013. Waste sorting is handled by the Association of Recyclable Material Collectors (ASCAMP), with materials transported to their facility by ASCAMP or city-owned trucks.

=== Communications ===
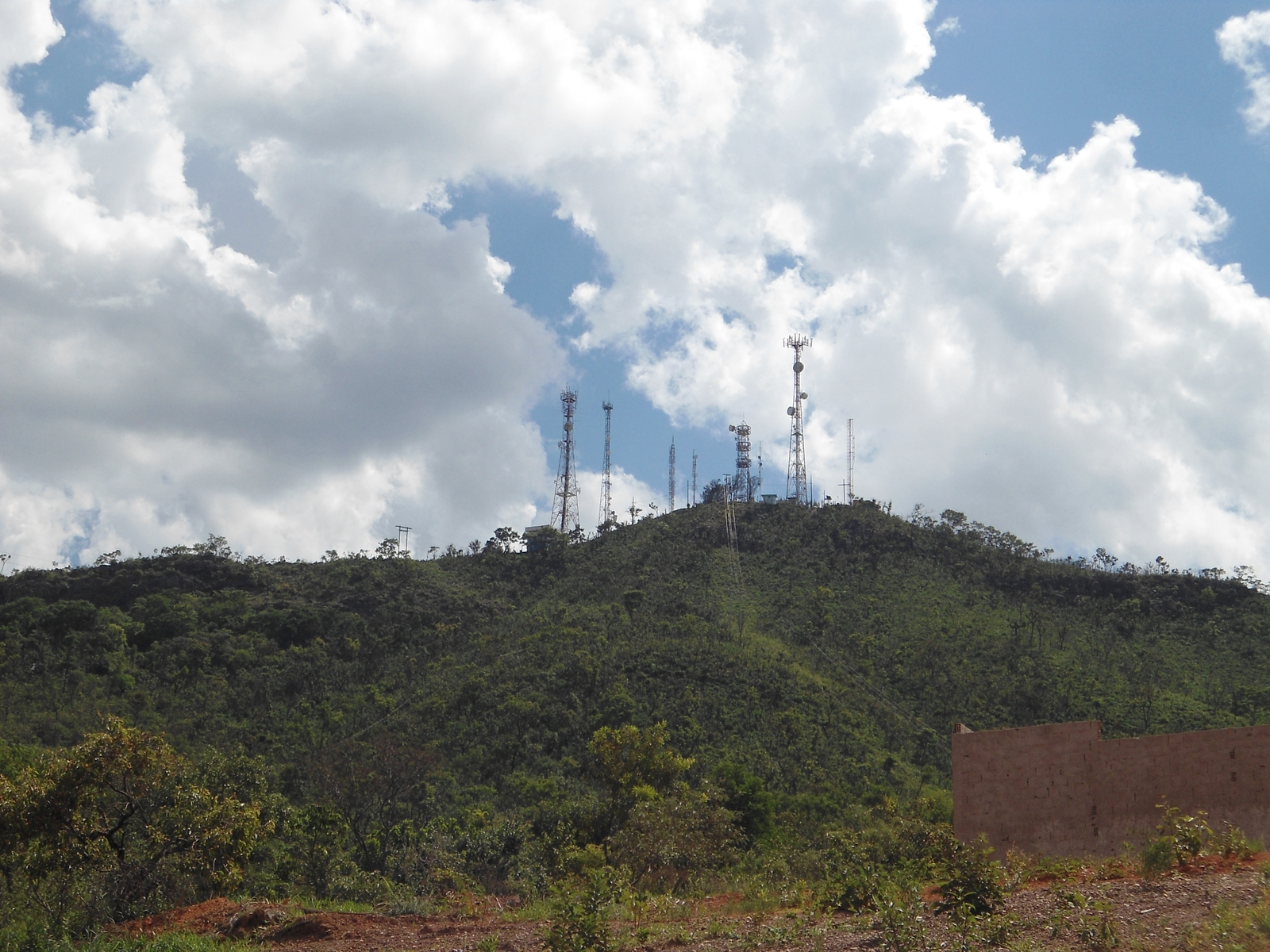
Communication antennas on Serra de Santa Cruz

Pará de Minas offers dial-up Internet and broadband (ADSL) services through paid providers, with fiber-optic Internet available in much of the city at speeds up to 10 gigabytes per second. Local fixed-line telephone services are provided by Algar Telecom. The area code (DDD) for Pará de Minas is 037, and the postal code ranges from 35660–001 to 35664–999. On 1 September 2008, the city gained number portability, allowing users to switch operators without changing their phone numbers, along with other municipalities sharing the same DDD.

The city receives several free-to-air television channels in UHF, including Globo Minas (affiliated with Rede Globo), Band Minas (Rede Bandeirantes), TV Alterosa (SBT), and RecordTV Minas (Rede Record). It is also home to TV Cidade and TV Integração (TVI), which retransmits Rede Minas signals. Major local newspapers include Gazeta Paraminense and Jornal Diário. Notable radio stations include Stilo FM, Rádio Santa Cruz, Espacial FM, and Total FM.

=== Transportation ===
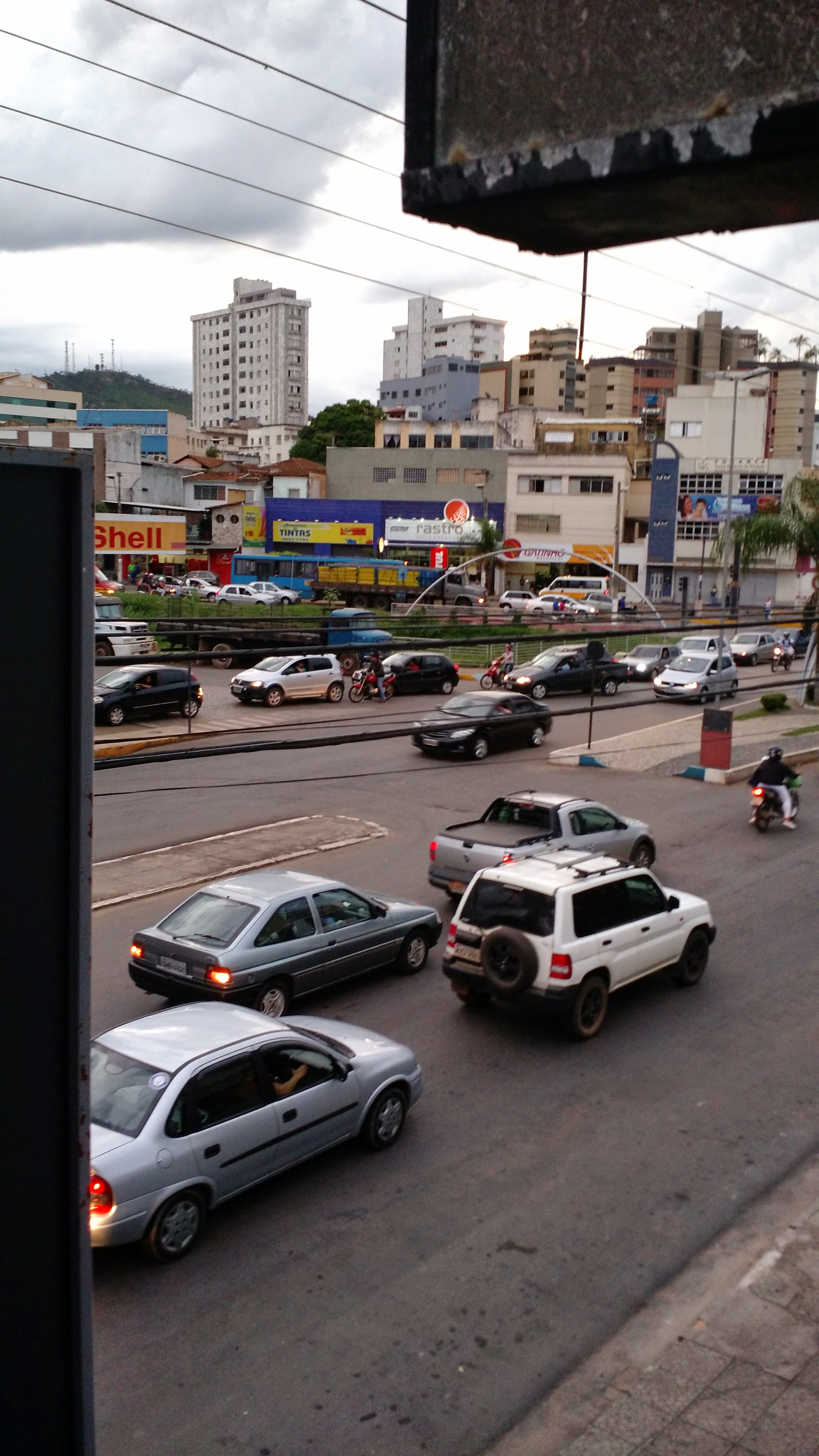
Traffic during peak hours on Presidente Vargas Avenue

The arrival of the Paracatu Railway, built in the early 20th century and later incorporated into the Oeste de Minas Railway, marked the first connection between Pará de Minas and other regions of Minas Gerais. The city's railway station was inaugurated on 22 March 1912 and operated until the early 1980s. In 1987, the railway branch passing through the city was closed due to urban expansion, and the station building was converted into a cinema in 1998. The decline of rail transport in Brazil resulted from the rise of highways and airports, with rail infrastructure deprioritized in favor of road construction between the 1950s and 1960s.

By road, the municipality is served by federal highways BR-352, which starts in Pará de Minas and ends in Goiânia, and BR-262, which begins in Vitória, Espírito Santo, passes through cities such as Belo Horizonte, Uberaba, and Campo Grande, and ends at the Bolivia border in Corumbá, Mato Grosso do Sul, serving as the main link to the state capital. State highways include MG-431, connecting Pará de Minas to Itaúna and Papagaios, and MG-060, running from Belo Horizonte to São Gonçalo do Abaeté at its junction with BR-365. The city's bus terminal, Antônio Epaminondas Marinho, was inaugurated in September 2007, featuring a commercial center with 12 stores, 12 ticket counters, and 12 boarding platforms, offering daily departures to various destinations within and beyond the state. The city also has a small airport, Arnaud Marinho Municipal Airport, with a 1,140-meter asphalt runway.

In 2012, the municipal vehicle fleet totaled 49,553, including 22,128 cars, 2,175 trucks, 335 tractor-trucks, 3,833 pickups, 948 vans, 164 minibuses, 14,910 motorcycles, 3,591 scooters, 221 buses, 11 wheeled tractors, 129 utility vehicles, and 1,108 other vehicle types. Turi manages public transportation in Pará de Minas, operating 31 bus lines within the municipality as of February 2014. The growing number of vehicles in recent years has led to increasingly slow traffic, particularly in the city center, and finding parking spaces on main commercial streets has become challenging, impacting local commerce.

== Culture ==
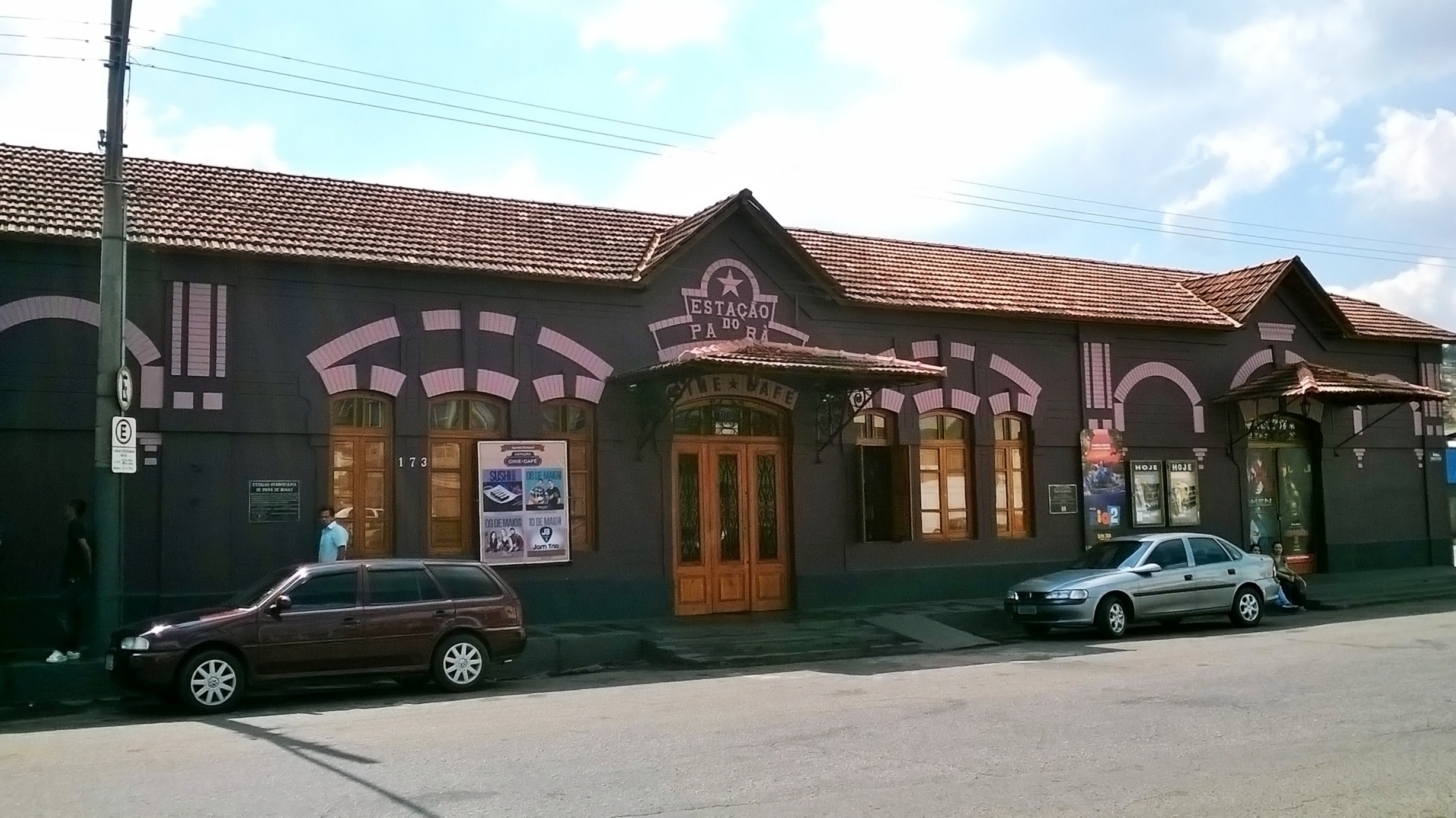
View of Cine Café

The Municipal Department of Culture and Education oversees cultural activities in Pará de Minas, aiming to plan and implement cultural policies through programs, projects, and activities that promote cultural development. Subordinate to the department are operational bodies, including the Professor Melo Cançado Public Library, the Raimundo Nogueira de Faria Municipal Arts and Crafts School (Sica), the Geraldo Martins Municipal Music School, the Mário Luiz Silva Public Archive, and the Pará de Minas Historical, Documentary, Photographic, and Sound Museum (MUSPAM). The Municipal Department of Sports, Leisure, and Tourism was separated from the culture department on 1 April 2013, taking responsibility for those sectors.

Notable artists from Pará de Minas who have achieved national or international recognition include composer, singer, and actor Benjamin de Oliveira, known as Brazil's first Black clown; visual artist, illustrator, and stained glass artist Mário Silésio, who created numerous panels in public buildings in Belo Horizonte; and actress Cida Mendes, known for playing Concessa in the program A Turma do Didi.

=== Performing arts and crafts ===
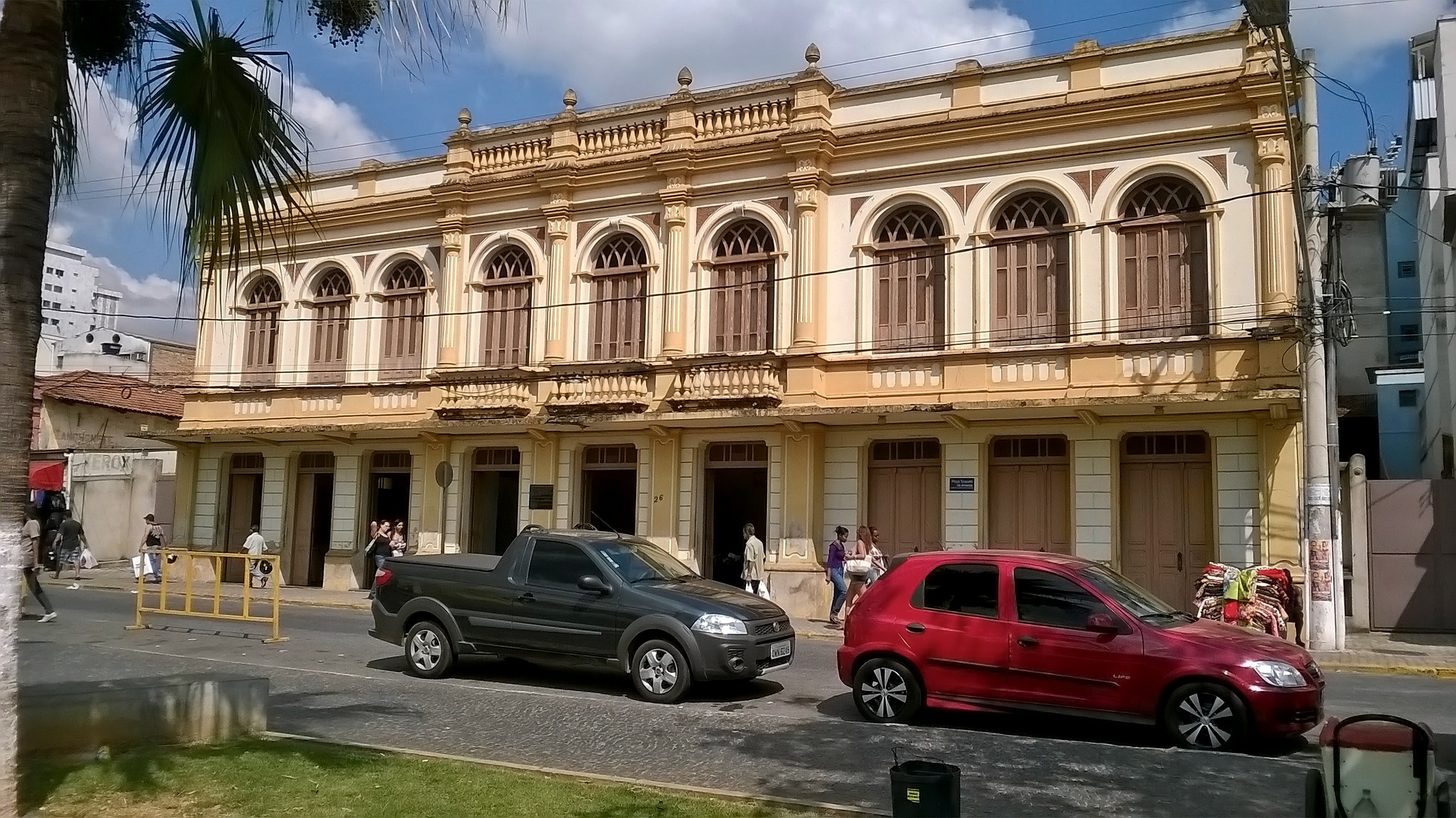
Facade of the House of Culture, inaugurated in 1924.

In 2002, the federal government allocated funds to build a theater in the city, which previously lacked one. The Geraldina Campos de Almeida Municipal Theater was inaugurated on 3 December 2012, featuring advanced lighting technology, accessibility for people with disabilities, and a capacity of 213 seats, located behind the House of Culture. The House of Culture, established in the 1910s, is set to receive investments for renovations and improved theater access by September 2015.

Handicrafts are a vibrant form of cultural expression in Pará de Minas, with the main activities, according to IBGE, including embroidery, and works made from clay and vegetable fibers. The Municipal Arts and Crafts School (SICA) hosts exhibitions and offers courses and workshops in visual, performing, and expressive arts for residents aged four and up. The Geraldo Martins Municipal Music School, also known as Geraldinho do Cavaquinho School, provides musical training, with some performances open to the public. Both schools are maintained in partnership with the Municipal Department of Culture and Education. The Professor Melo Cançado Public Library holds the city’s largest literary collection, receiving 550 new books and audiovisual materials in March 2014.

The Pedro Nestor Literary Center, built in the early 20th century, hosted artistic and literary events such as concerts, lectures, conferences, and dances but was deactivated in the 1980s. Plans for its reopening, potentially for use by the municipal Academy of Letters, are under consideration. The academy, with 21 seats, was founded on 1 December 1997. The Pará de Minas Historical, Documentary, Photographic, and Sound Museum (MUSPAM), founded on 10 February 1984 and reinaugurated on 10 November 1988 and 28 March 2014, is housed in one of the city’s oldest buildings, originally built for Manuel Baptista, known as "Patafufo," a city founder. It is the main place where the city's memories are kept, with a collection largely composed of donated photos, documents, and materials from the city government and local Catholic parishes.

=== Leisure, tourism, and events ===
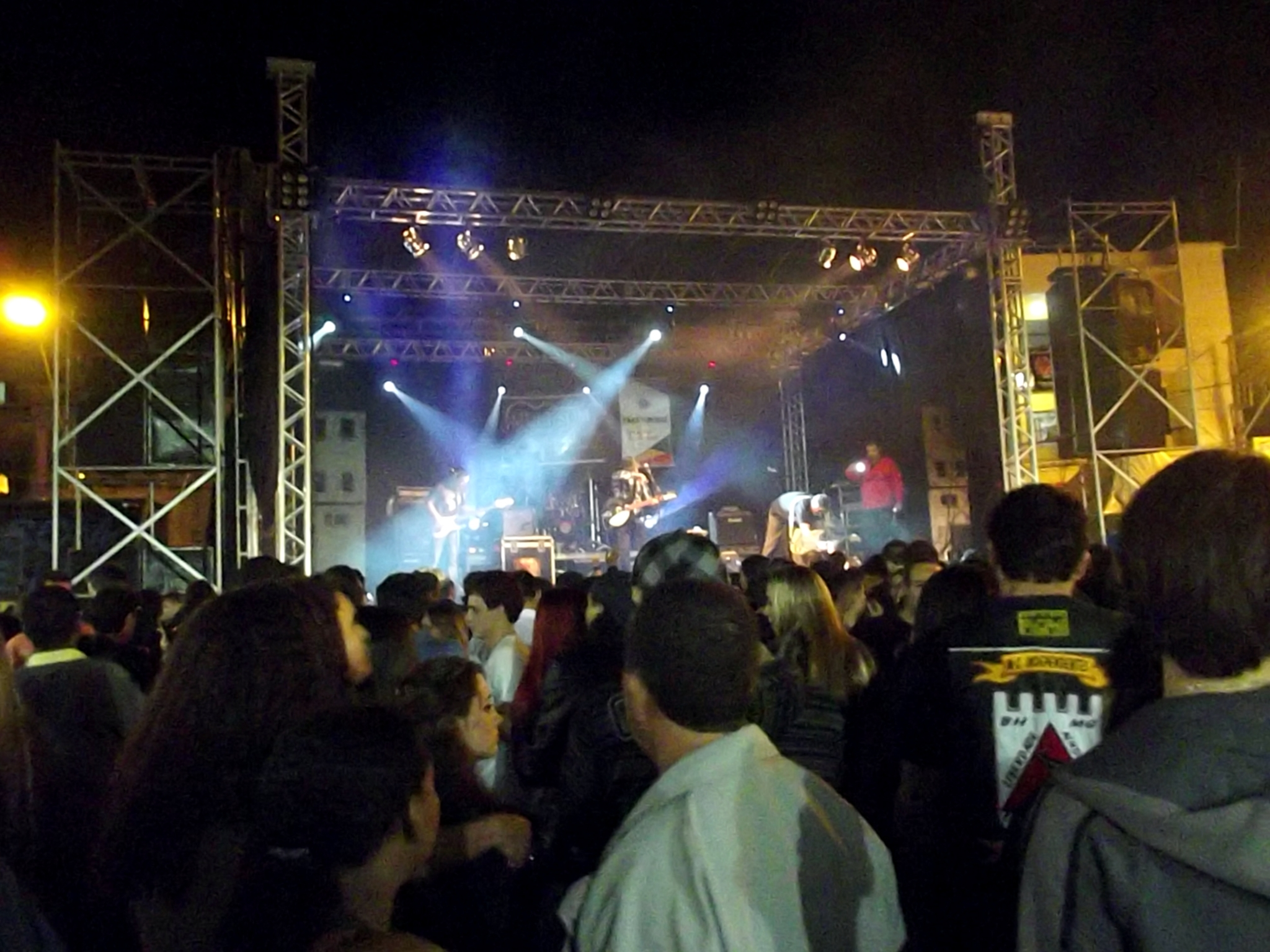
Performance by the Creedence Cover band during the 2013 National Motorcyclists’ Meeting at Torquato de Almeida Square.

The former railway station, deactivated in the 1980s, has housed the Cine-Pub since 1998, previously known as Cine Café until 2006. The venue features an art gallery and a small bar with live performances. In February 2013, it was closed due to inadequate fire prevention measures and the end of the lease with Cinematográfica União, which had managed it since 2006. It was transferred to local entrepreneurs and reopened in March 2014. Located in Torquato de Almeida Square, a cultural hub according to the city government, the square can host events of various sizes.

The city center is home to numerous bars and restaurants that enliven Pará de Minas’ nightlife. The city government encourages investment in festivals and events, often in partnership with local businesses, to boost socioeconomic development. These events attract visitors from other cities, necessitating improved infrastructure, professionalizing the sector, and increasing economic activity, benefiting both tourists and residents.

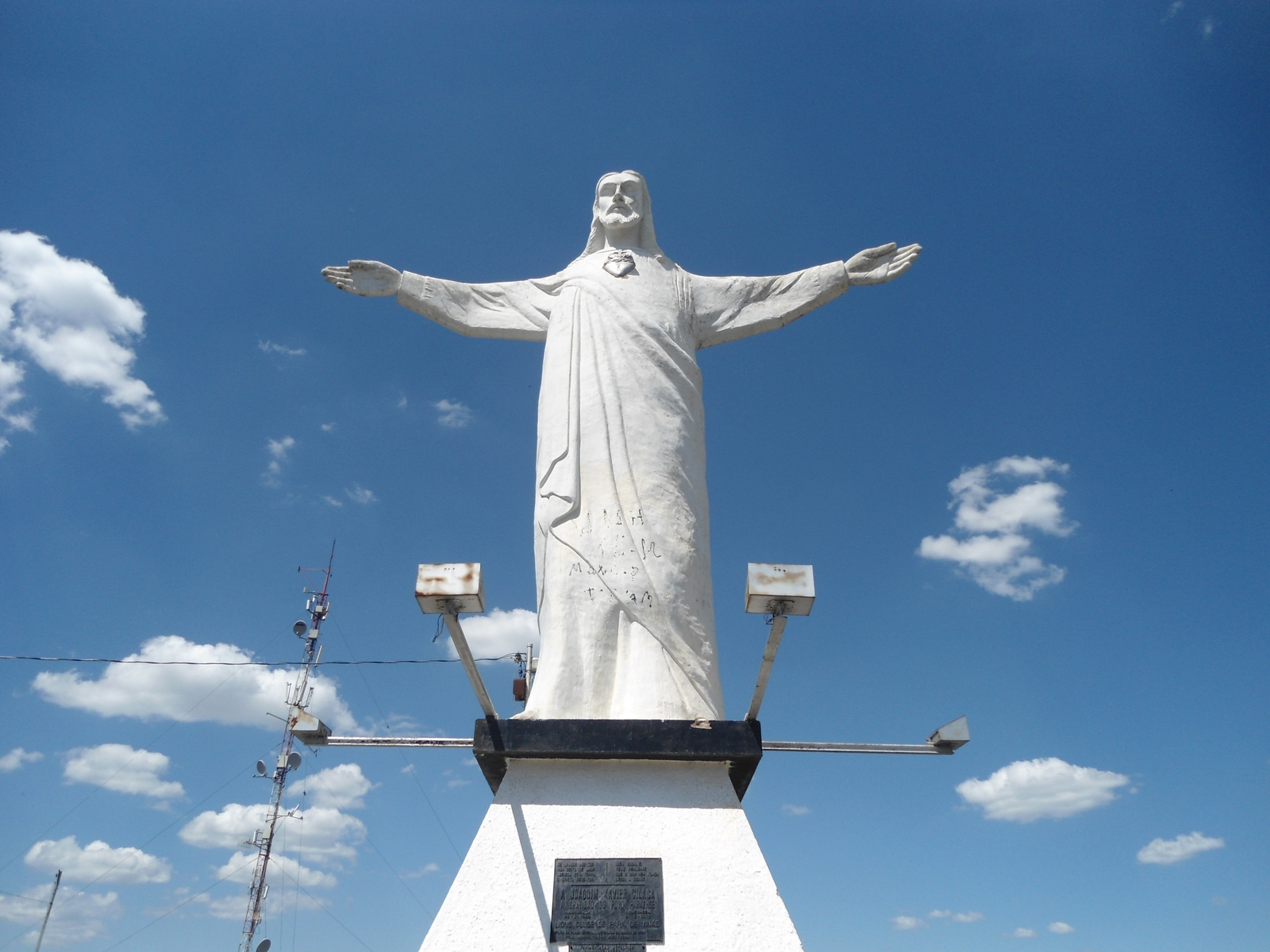
Christ the Redeemer of Pará de Minas

In addition to the projects and initiatives focused on the performing arts sector mentioned earlier, several notable events in Pará de Minas deserve recognition. These include the city's Carnival, known as Pará Folia, featuring dances to the rhythm of carnival marches, parades with the municipality's carnival blocks, musical performances with electric trios, and Pará Folia Kids (for children); the Pará de Minas Cavalcade, which involves a parade of riders and amazons from various municipalities in Minas Gerais through the city's main streets, heading toward the Francisco Olivé Diniz Exhibition Park, followed by country music performances; the Band Gathering, where musical bands from within or outside the municipality perform in open-air concerts, processions, and civic parades; the June festivals, held at clubs, Catholic communities, and schools, featuring quadrilha performances, musical shows, and stalls with traditional foods; the Fest Frango (State Chicken and Swine Fair), a statewide event aimed at promoting poultry and swine production, with consecutive days of exhibitions, lectures for farmers, and musical performances; and the New Year's Eve celebrations at the turn of the year. The Verde - Bandeirantes Trail Tourist Circuit, which includes Pará de Minas along with other municipalities in the region, was established on 23 March 1999 to promote cultural activities and tourism in these areas, officially recognized by the Minas Gerais government on 20 June 2005.

Among the city's tourist attractions are: the Our Lady of Lourdes Grotto, inaugurated on 1 February 1959, decorated with the artistry of master craftsman João Viegas and located next to a natural water spring; Maria Capanema House, built in the 19th century along the Pitangui road, with its original architecture preserved; the Christ the Redeemer statue, accessible via a staircase of 608 steps and fourteen landings, constructed between 1958 and 1963, designed by Joaquim Xavier Villaça, inspired by a replica of the Christ the Redeemer statue in Rio de Janeiro; the Serra de Santa Cruz, where the Christ statue is located, serving as the municipality's main ecological reserve; and Bariri Park, a green area in the city center, ideal for relaxation, walks, and leisure activities. The Our Lady of Grace Church, built between 1947 and 1958, stands out for its Neo-Gothic and Art Deco architectural styles, making it the oldest religious temple in Pará de Minas.

== Sports ==
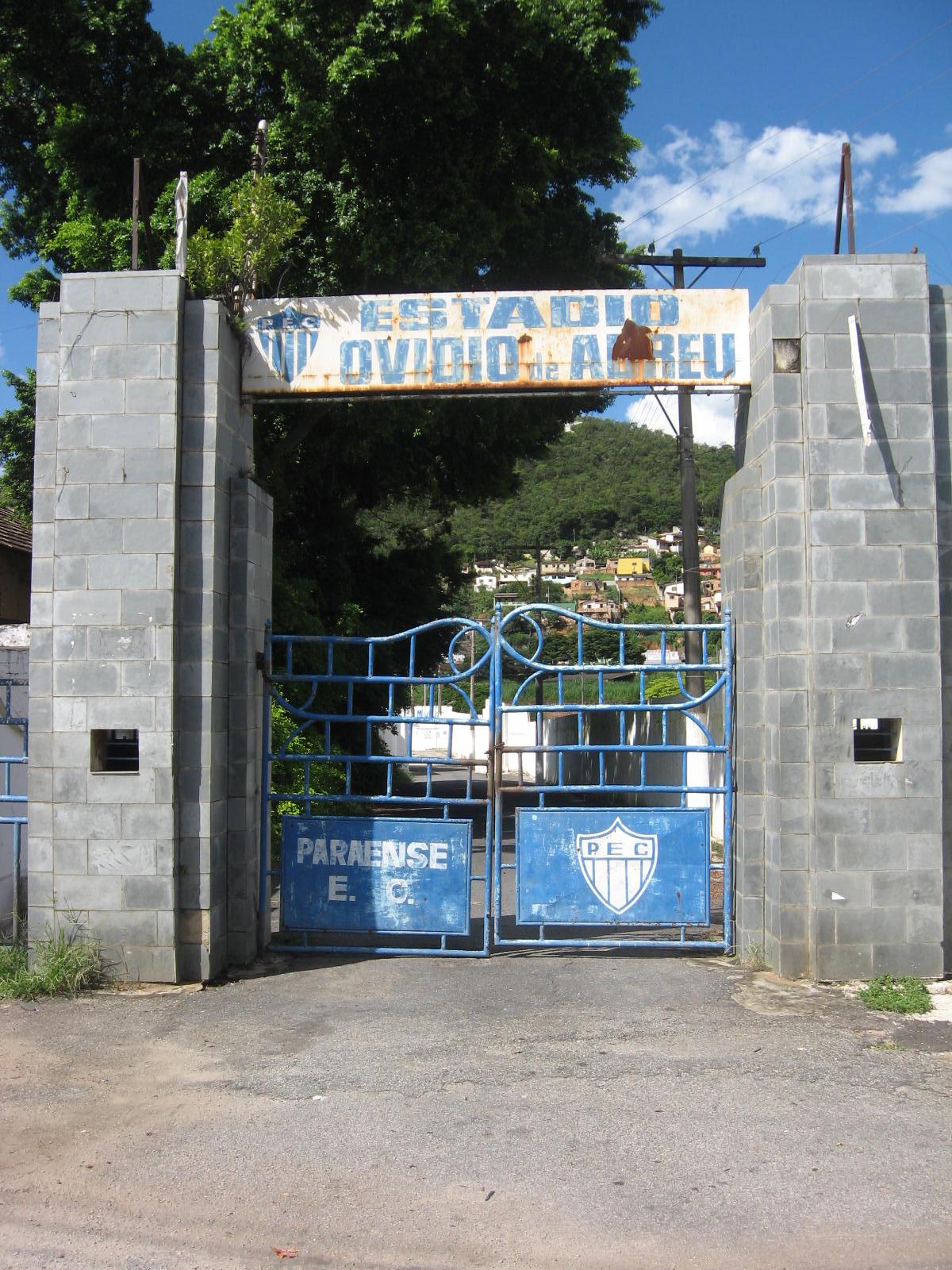
Former entrance to the Ovídio de Abreu Stadium, in 2010.

The city is home to teams in various sports, which occasionally achieve prominence by winning regional, state, or even national titles, including basketball, handball, volleyball, and futsal. Extreme sports, such as skateboarding, BMX, and athletics, are also popular, particularly among the younger population. Bariri Park features a walking track, a skateboarding area, and multi-sport courts used for basketball, volleyball, beach volleyball, futsal, peteca, dodgeball, martial arts, and gymnastics. The Ovídio de Abreu Stadium is the main football stadium in Pará de Minas, with a capacity of approximately 1,500 people.

The most successful football team in the city is Paraense Esporte Clube, founded on 15 May 1936, which has competed in several editions of the Campeonato Mineiro, in both its main division and youth categories. Football has been a part of Pará de Minas since the early 20th century, when people played with makeshift balls made of socks in the streets. Later, workers responsible for the construction of the Paracatu Railway introduced leather balls for recreation. The Mello Sobrinho Foot-Ball Club, founded in 1923 and dissolved shortly after, was the city's first team, succeeded by the Americano Futebol Clube, which existed from 1924 to 1931 and paved the way for the establishment of other teams, particularly between the 1940s and 1960s. In 1976, the Pará de Minas Sports League was created to organize football championships and events in the city and region, with the Paraminense Amateur Football Championship held annually since 1977.

In 2011, plans were proposed for the construction of a training center for FC Porto in the city, supported by the state government for civil works, with renovations planned for the Ovídio de Abreu Stadium and completion expected by 2018, generating approximately 800 direct and indirect jobs. After several delays, earthworks began in September 2012 on a 980,000 m^{2} site, but in April 2013, the city government announced the termination of the contract due to a lack of communication from the responsible company, with the land repurposed for another project.

== Holidays ==
In Pará de Minas, there are four municipal holidays, established by Law No. 1,327 of 8 February 1967, in addition to eight national holidays and optional holidays. The municipal holidays are: Good Friday, which in 2025 is celebrated on April 18; Corpus Christi, which is observed in the same year on June 19; the day of Our Lady of Sorrows, celebrated on 15 September; and the Immaculate Conception Day, on 8 December. According to Federal Law No. 9,093 of 12 September 1995, municipalities may have up to four religious municipal holidays, including Good Friday.

The city's anniversary, celebrated on 20 September, refers to the date of the first establishment of the then Vila do Pará in 1859, as the municipality was abolished in 1872 and re-emancipated in 1874, with a second (definitive) establishment on 25 March 1876. There is no municipal holiday to commemorate the city's anniversary, though there has been discussion about designating 20 September as one, which would require the elimination of another existing holiday.

== See also ==
- List of municipalities in Minas Gerais
- Gold mining in Brazil
