= Ângelo (footballer, born 1953) =

Brazilian footballer

Personal information
- Full name: Paulino Angélio de Souza
- Date of birth: May 31, 1953
- Place of birth: Onça de Pitangui, Minas Gerais, Brazil
- Date of death: August 2, 2007 (aged 54)
- Place of death: Itaúna, Minas Gerais, Brazil
- Height: 1.65 m (5 ft 5 in)
- Position: Midfielder

Youth career
- Atlético Mineiro

Senior career*
| Years | Team | Apps | (Gls) |
| 1970–1980 | Atlético Mineiro | 76 | (3) |
| 1972–1974 | →Nacional-AM (loan) | - | (-) |
| 1981 | Guarani | - | (-) |
| 1981–1982 | Fluminense | 17 | (0) |
| 1983 | Ponte Preta | 12 | (1) |
| 1983 | Santa Cruz | 10 | (0) |
| 1984 | São Bento | - | (-) |
| 1985 | Sport | 22 | (0) |
| 1986 | Marília | - | (-) |
| 1987 | Democrata-GV | - | (-) |
| 1988 | Aimoré | - | (-) |

International career
| 1971–1972 | Brazil U-23 | 9 | (0) |
| 1975 | Brazil | Called up | |
- * Club domestic league appearances and goals

Paulino Angelino de Souza (31 May 1953 – 2 August 2007), known as just Ângelo, was a Brazilian footballer who played in the 1972 Olympic Games and was part of Brazil’s squad for the 1975 Copa América.

== Career ==
Born in Onça de Pitangui, Ângelo began playing football as a midfielder with local side Clube Atlético Mineiro. In a 10-year span he made 238 official appearances for the club, winning the Campeonato Mineiro three times, the Taça Minas Gerais once and the Campeonato Brasileiro Série A once. He was part of the 1971 Campeonato Brasileiro Série A championship-winning side, and the 1977 Campeonato Brasileiro Série A runners'-up side.

== Personal ==
Ângelo died of a heart attack at age 54.
