= Igaratinga =

Municipality in Minas Gerais, Brazil

Coordinates: 19°56′S 44°42′W

- Municipality
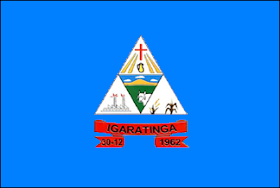
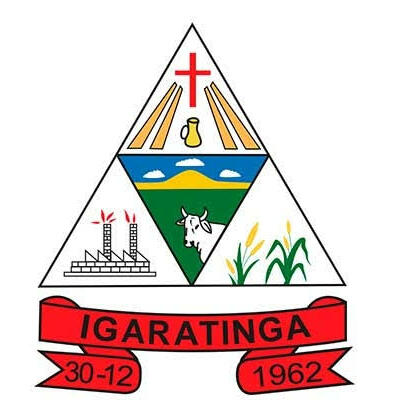
- Flag Coat of arms
- Interactive map of Igaratinga
- Country: Brazil
- Region: Southeast
- State: Minas Gerais
- Mesoregion: Oeste de Minas

Population (2022 Census)
  - Total: 10,830
  - Estimate (2025): 11,345
  - Density: 2,960/sq mi (1,141/km^{2})
- Time zone: UTC−3 (BRT)

Igaratinga is a municipality in the state of Minas Gerais in the Southeast region of Brazil.

== See also ==
- List of municipalities in Minas Gerais
