= Metropolitan belt (Brazil) =

Metropolitan Belt (Portuguese: Colar Metropolitano) is an official designation by the Brazilian government for municipalities that are adjacent to a metropolitan area, but are not part of it. However, since metropolitan areas can only contain adjacent municipalities, they are natural candidates to be merged to the area in future redefinitions. Sometimes, when by the negotiation of merging of new municipalities, the term metropolitan belt refers only to the candidate municipalities.

Typically the number of participants of a metropolitan belt is proportional to the number of the constituting municipalities of the metropolitan regions. The Belo Horizonte metropolitan belt is composed of 14 municipalities, having the metropolitan area 34 municipalities.
