= Conceição do Pará =

- Municipality
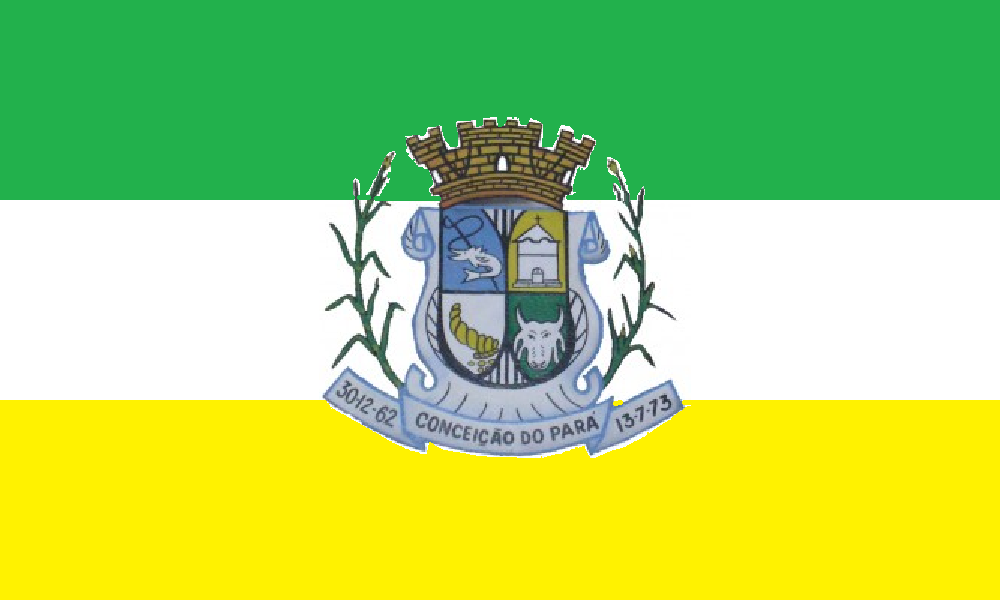
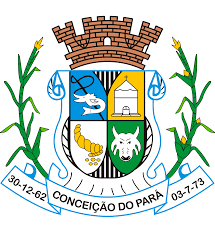
- Flag Coat of arms

- Location in Brazil
- Coordinates: 19°45′10″S 44°53′49″W
- Country: Brazil
- Region: Southeast
- State: Minas Gerais
- Mesoregion: Oeste de Minas

Population (2022 Census)
  - Total: 5,415
  - Estimate (2025): 5,584
- Time zone: UTC−3 (BRT)

Conceição do Pará is a municipality in the state of Minas Gerais in the Southeast region of Brazil.

== See also ==
- List of municipalities in Minas Gerais
