= Mateus Leme =

Municipality of Brazil

Coordinates: 19°59′09″S 44°25′40″W

- Municipality
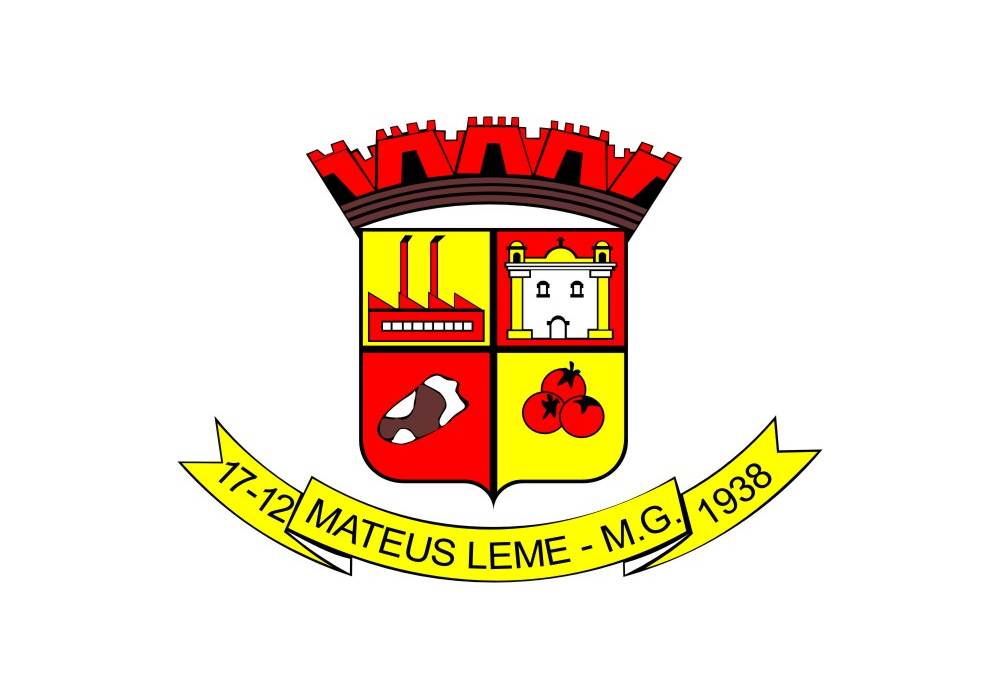
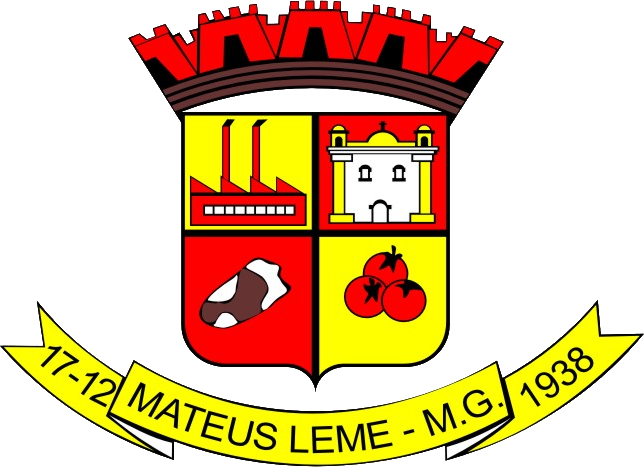
- Flag Coat of arms
- Interactive map of Mateus Leme
- Country: Brazil
- State: Minas Gerais
- Region: Southeast

Population (2022 Census)
  - Total: 37,841
  - Estimate (2025): 40,814
- Time zone: UTC−3 (BRT)

Location of Mateus Leme within Minas Gerais

Mateus Leme is a Brazilian municipality located in the state of Minas Gerais. The city belongs to the mesoregion Metropolitana de Belo Horizonte and to the microregion of Belo Horizonte. As of 2020, the estimated population was 40,814.

== See also ==
- List of municipalities in Minas Gerais
