= São José da Varginha =

- Municipality
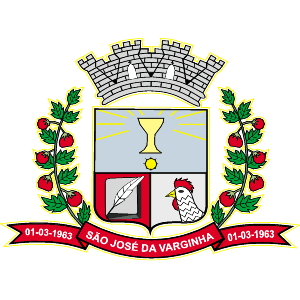
- Coat of arms

- Location in Brazil
- Coordinates: 19°42′36″S 44°33′25″W
- Country: Brazil
- Region: Southeast
- State: Minas Gerais
- Mesoregion: Metropolitana de Belo Horizonte

Population (2022 Census)
  - Total: 4,536
  - Estimate (2025): 4,698
- Time zone: UTC−3 (BRT)

São José da Varginha is a municipality in the state of Minas Gerais in the Southeast region of Brazil.

== See also ==
- List of municipalities in Minas Gerais
