= Pequi, Minas Gerais =

Coordinates: 19°37′58″S 44°39′32″W

- Municipality
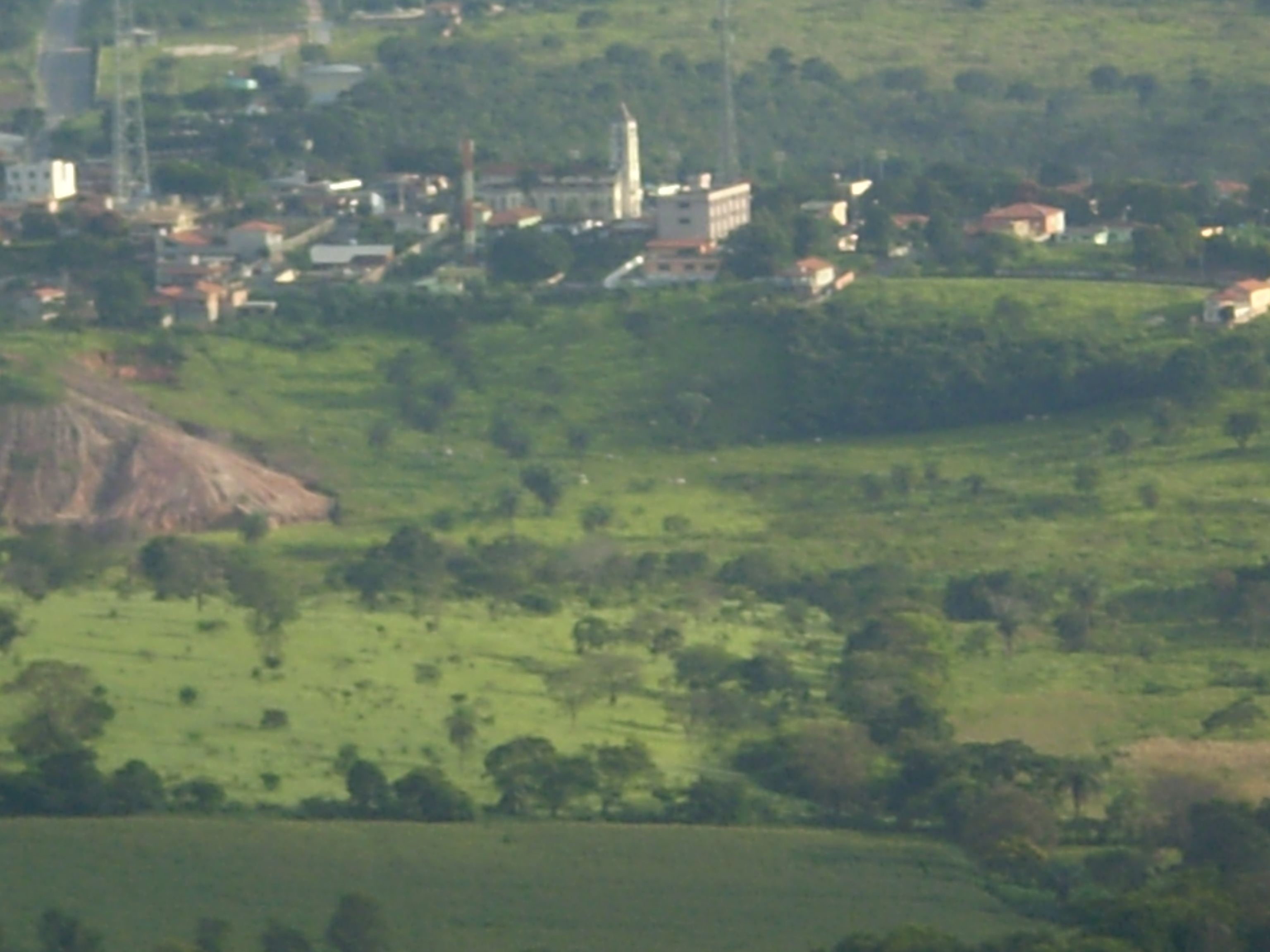
- Partial view of Pequi
- Interactive map of Pequi, Minas Gerais
- Country: Brazil
- Region: Southeast
- State: Minas Gerais
- Mesoregion: Metropolitana de Belo Horizonte

Population (2022 Census)
  - Total: 4,155
  - Estimate (2025): 4,265
- Time zone: UTC−3 (BRT)

Pequi, Minas Gerais is a municipality in the state of Minas Gerais in the Southeast region of Brazil.

== See also ==
- List of municipalities in Minas Gerais
