= Florestal =

- Florestal
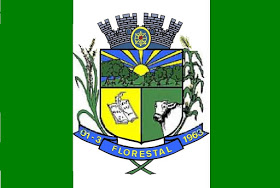
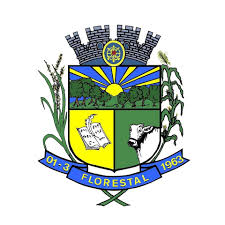
- Flag Coat of arms

- Location in Minas Gerais
- Coordinates: 19°53′20″S 44°25′58″W
- Country: Brazil
- Region: Southeast
- State: Minas Gerais
- Founded: December 30, 1962

Government
  - Mayor: Wagner dos santos júnior

Area
  - Total: 194.356 km^{2} (75.041 sq mi)

Population (2022 Census)
  - Total: 8,045
  - Estimate (2025): 8,469
  - Density: 414/km^{2} (1,070/sq mi)
- Time zone: UTC−3 (BRT)
- Postal code: 35690-000 to 35693-999
- Area code: +55 31
- Website: https://www.florestal.mg.gov.br/

Florestal is a municipality in the state of Minas Gerais, Brazil. The city belongs to the mesoregion Metropolitana de Belo Horizonte and to the microregion of Belo Horizonte, and it is part of the Belo Horizonte metropolitan region. The city is 65 km distant of Belo Horizonte. According to the census made by the Brazilian Institute of Geography and Statistics, the municipality had 8 045 inhabitants in 2022. The city has a Federal University of Viçosa campus.

== Geography ==
=== Climate ===
According to data from the National Institute of Meteorology, referring to the timestamp between 1961 and 1984, and from 1986 onwards, the lowest registered temperature in Florestal was of -2.5 °C on July 27, 1965. Another register of a negative temperature happened on June 22, 1963, with a minimum temperature of -1.8 °C. The greatest temperature was of 38.6 °C on November 14, 2023, during an intense heat wave. The greatest accumulated of precipitation in 24 hours reached 187.8 millimeters (mm) on December 17, 2011.

Since June, 2008, the wind gust record reached 20.8 m/s (74.9 km/h) on November 7, 2015. The lowest index of air relative humidity was of 10% in various dates. According to the National Institute for Space Research, the municipality is the 282th in the ranking of occurrences of electric discharges in the state of Minas Gerais, with an annual average of 2.92 by km^{2}/year.

Climate data for Florestal (1981–2010)
Month	Jan	Feb	Mar	Apr	May	Jun	Jul	Aug	Sep	Oct	Nov	Dec	Year
Mean daily maximum °C (°F)	29.9 (85.8)	30.6 (87.1)	30.3 (86.5)	29.4 (84.9)	27.4 (81.3)	26.4 (79.5)	26.7 (80.1)	28.1 (82.6)	29.7 (85.5)	29.9 (85.8)	29.3 (84.7)	29.3 (84.7)	28.9 (84.0)
Daily mean °C (°F)	22.8 (73.0)	23.0 (73.4)	22.6 (72.7)	21.1 (70.0)	18.4 (65.1)	16.3 (61.3)	15.9 (60.6)	17.3 (63.1)	19.9 (67.8)	21.5 (70.7)	22.1 (71.8)	22.5 (72.5)	20.3 (68.5)
Mean daily minimum °C (°F)	18.2 (64.8)	17.9 (64.2)	17.3 (63.1)	15.1 (59.2)	11.9 (53.4)	9.3 (48.7)	8.5 (47.3)	9.7 (49.5)	13.2 (55.8)	15.9 (60.6)	17.3 (63.1)	18.1 (64.6)	14.4 (57.9)
Average precipitation mm (inches)	275.5 (10.85)	154.4 (6.08)	185.1 (7.29)	58.5 (2.30)	25.3 (1.00)	12.0 (0.47)	7.4 (0.29)	12.1 (0.48)	44.5 (1.75)	90.6 (3.57)	208.1 (8.19)	319.9 (12.59)	1,393.4 (54.86)
Average precipitation days (≥ 1.0 mm)	15	11	11	5	3	2	1	2	4	7	13	17	91
Average relative humidity (%)	68.9	66.4	65.5	65.2	64.0	61.9	60.8	58.8	60.1	63.6	65.9	69.3	64.2
Mean monthly sunshine hours	180.6	169.5	194.4	217.4	223.9	223.2	247.7	241.1	184.8	183.1	167.7	146.2	2,379.6
Source: Instituto Nacional de Meteorologia

== See also ==
- List of municipalities in Minas Gerais
- Federal University of Viçosa
- Belo Horizonte
