= Onça de Pitangui =

- Municipality
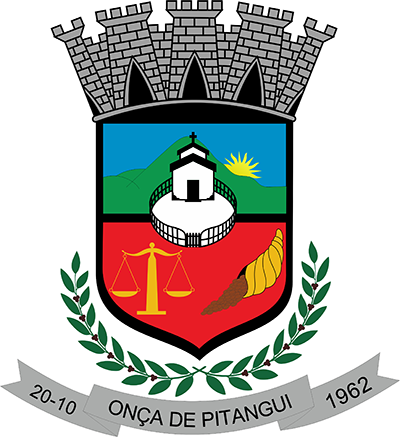
- Coat of arms

- Location in Brazil
- Coordinates: 19°43′48″S 44°48′25″W
- Country: Brazil
- Region: Southeast
- State: Minas Gerais
- Mesoregion: Metropolitana de Belo Horizonte

Government
  - Mayor: Geraldo Tachinha (PP)

Population (2022 Census)
  - Total: 2,969
  - Estimate (2025): 3,024
  - Density: 31.1/sq mi (12.02/km^{2})
- Time zone: UTC−3 (BRT)

Onça de Pitangui is a municipality in the state of Minas Gerais in the Southeast region of Brazil.

== See also ==
- List of municipalities in Minas Gerais
