= Immediate Geographic Region of Sete Lagoas =

Urban administrative region in Minas Gerais, Brazil

The Immediate Geographic Region of Sete Lagoas is one of the 10 immediate geographic regions within the Intermediate Geographic Region of Belo Horizonte. It is also among the 70 immediate geographic regions found in the state of Minas Gerais, Brazil. Furthermore, it is one of the 509 immediate geographic regions established by the National Institute of Geography and Statistics (IBGE) in 2017.

== Municipalities ==
The Immediate Geographic Region of Sete Lagoas, in the state of Minas Gerais, Brazil.

It comprises 19 municipalities:

- Araçaí
- Baldim
- Cachoeira da Prata
- Caetanópolis
- Capim Branco
- Conceição do Mato Dentro
- Congonhas do Norte
- Cordisburgo
- Fortuna de Minas
- Funilândia
- Inhaúma
- Jequitibá
- Matozinhos
- Morro do Pilar
- Paraopeba
- Prudente de Morais
- Santana de Pirapama
- Santana do Riacho
- Sete Lagoas
