= Sete Lagoas =

- Municipality
- Municipality of Sete Lagoas
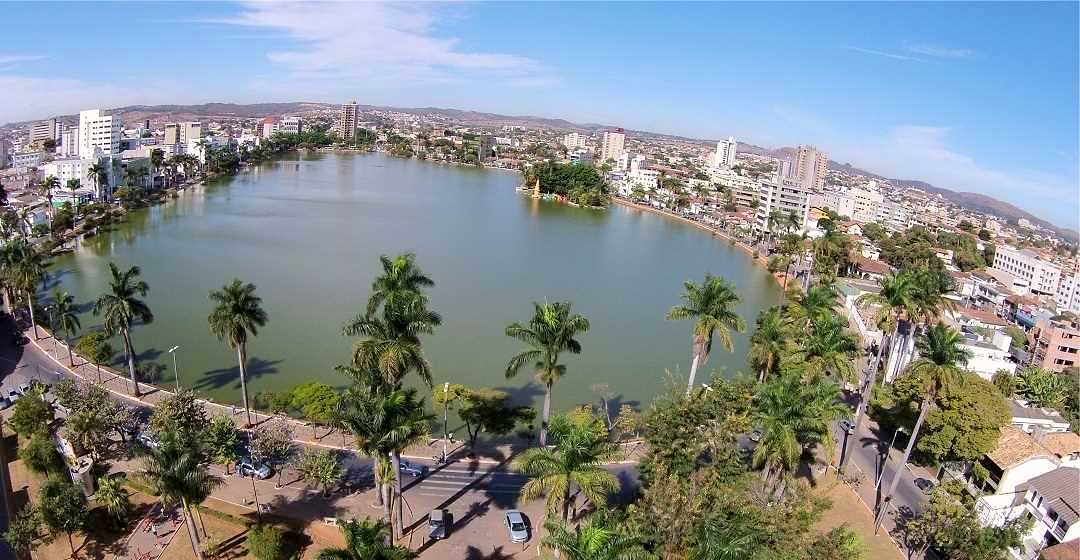
- Downtown Sete Lagoas, with a view from Lagoa Paulino, one of the seven lagoons which name the city.

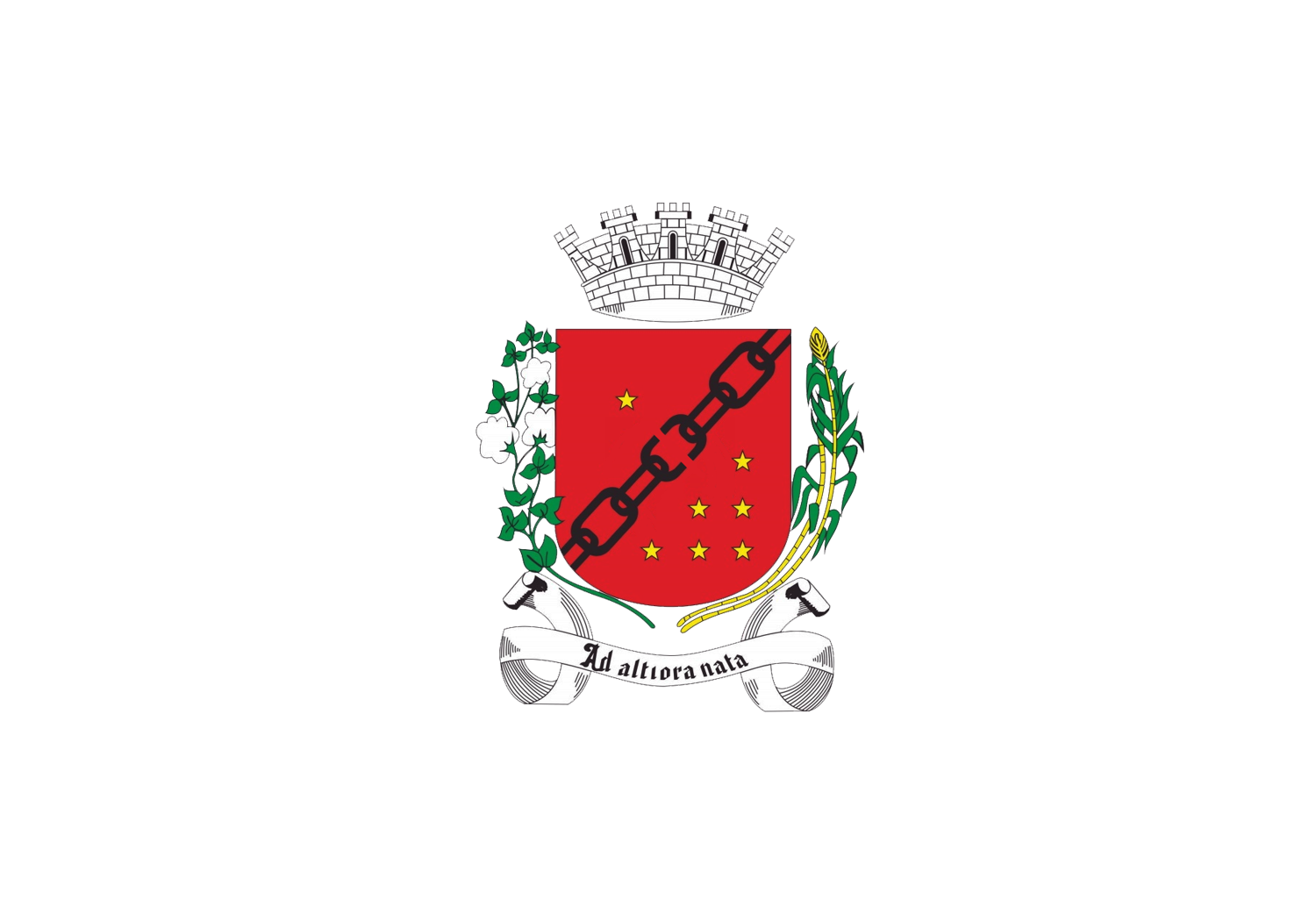
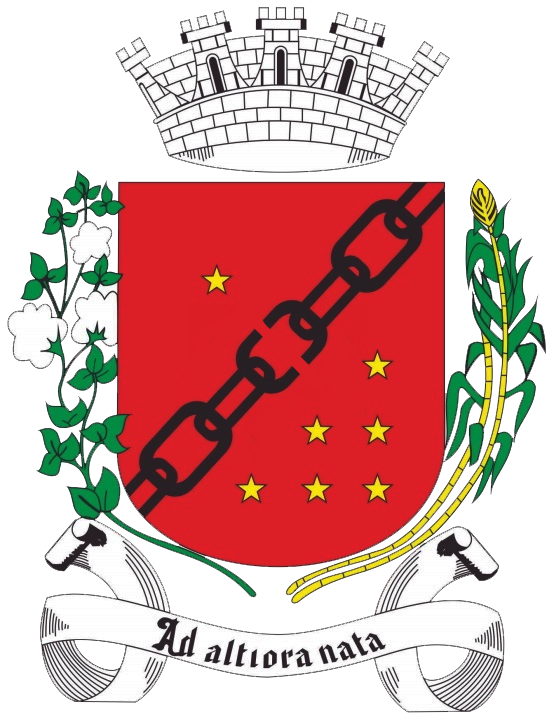
- Flag Coat of arms
- Nickname: Cidade dos Sete Lagos Encantados (City of the Seven Enchanted Lakes)
- Motto: Ad Altiora Nata (Latin); Born to high

- Localization of Sete Lagoas in Brazil
- Coordinates: 19°27′57″S 44°14′49″W
- Country: Brazil
- Region: Southeast
- State: Minas Gerais
- Founded: November 30, 1880

Government
  - Mayor: Duílio de Castro Faria (PATRI)

Area
  - Total: 537.476 km^{2} (207.521 sq mi)
- Elevation: 766.73 m (2,515.5 ft)

Population (2022 Brazilian census)
  - Total: 227,397
  - Estimate (2025): 238,909
  - Density: 423.41/km^{2} (1,096.6/sq mi)
  - Demonym: sete-lagoano
- Time zone: UTC−3 (BRT)
- HDI (2010): 0.760 – high

Sete Lagoas (meaning 'Seven Lagoons' in Portuguese) is a city in the Brazilian state of Minas Gerais. The municipal area is 537 km^{2} while the population was 238,909 in 2025.

== Geography ==
=== Location ===
Sete Lagoas is situated about 70 kilometres from Belo Horizonte, the capital of Minas Gerais. The BR 040 motorway connects Sete Lagoas with Belo Horizonte and the national capital Brasília. The altitude is 761 metres above sea level. It is surrounded by the following municipalities: Araçaí, Funilândia, Prudente de Morais, Capim Branco, Esmeraldas, Inhaúma, Paraopeba, and Caetanópolis.

=== Climate ===
According to data from the meteorological station of the municipality, the average temperature of the city between the years 1961 to 1990 was 20.9 °C.

The coldest month (July) had an average of 17.5 °C while the hottest month (February) had an average of 23.0 °C.

The four lowest temperature records at the Sete Lagoas meteorological station were as follows: 0.8 °C on July 18, 1926; 1.3 °C on October 31, 1942; 1.5 °C on June 26, 1937 and also on May 8, 1942.

Climate data for Sete Lagoas (1981–2010)
Month	Jan	Feb	Mar	Apr	May	Jun	Jul	Aug	Sep	Oct	Nov	Dec	Year
Mean daily maximum °C (°F)	29.6 (85.3)	30.2 (86.4)	29.6 (85.3)	28.8 (83.8)	27.1 (80.8)	26.4 (79.5)	26.7 (80.1)	28.2 (82.8)	29.6 (85.3)	30.1 (86.2)	29.0 (84.2)	28.7 (83.7)	28.7 (83.7)
Daily mean °C (°F)	23.3 (73.9)	23.5 (74.3)	23.1 (73.6)	21.8 (71.2)	19.4 (66.9)	18.0 (64.4)	18.1 (64.6)	19.7 (67.5)	21.7 (71.1)	23.0 (73.4)	22.9 (73.2)	22.9 (73.2)	21.5 (70.7)
Mean daily minimum °C (°F)	18.9 (66.0)	18.7 (65.7)	18.5 (65.3)	16.8 (62.2)	14.0 (57.2)	12.2 (54.0)	12.0 (53.6)	13.3 (55.9)	15.7 (60.3)	17.7 (63.9)	18.5 (65.3)	18.8 (65.8)	16.3 (61.3)
Average precipitation mm (inches)	260.6 (10.26)	143.3 (5.64)	168.7 (6.64)	51.6 (2.03)	27.8 (1.09)	4.5 (0.18)	6.1 (0.24)	13.1 (0.52)	39.5 (1.56)	87.9 (3.46)	210.4 (8.28)	321.3 (12.65)	1,334.8 (52.55)
Average precipitation days (≥ 1.0 mm)	14	10	10	5	3	1	1	2	4	7	13	17	87
Average relative humidity (%)	74.8	71.9	74.3	71.9	70.7	68	62.5	56.8	55.9	61.6	71.8	76.6	68.1
Mean monthly sunshine hours	189.5	203.0	202.5	239.4	243.4	249.7	266.6	272.5	236.3	211.1	174.3	157.4	2,645.7
Source: Instituto Nacional de Meteorologia

=== Distances to other cities in Minas Gerais ===
- Montes Claros: 355 km.
- Uberaba: 521 km.
- Uberlândia: 582 km.
- Três Marias: 202 km.
- Governador Valadares: 383 km.
- Juiz de Fora: 331 km.
- Funilândia: 28 km.

=== Statistical Micro-region of Sete Lagoas ===
Sete Lagoas is also a statistical micro-region with 20 municipalities: Araçaí, Baldim, Cachoeira da Prata, Caetanópolis, Capim Branco, Cordisburgo, Fortuna de Minas, Funilândia, Inhaúma, Jaboticatubas, Jequitibá, Maravilhas, Matozinhos, Papagaios, Paraopeba, Pequi, Prudente de Morais, Santana de Pirapama, Santana do Riacho, and Sete Lagoas. In 2000 the population of this area was 341,568 inhabitants in a total area of 8,560.40;km².

== Economy ==
The economy is based on services, industry and some agriculture. The GDP in 2005 was R$2 billion 800 million, with 1 billion 120 million from services, 1 billion 250 thousand from industry, and 17 million from agriculture. There were 824 transformation industries in 2005 with 15,000 workers. Heavy industry was important with 23 factories producing mainly pig iron. There is an Iveco-Fiat plant, which opened in 2001, that produces trucks and vans.

== Health and education ==
In 2005 there were 51 public and 53 private health clinics. There were 5 hospitals with 315 beds. Educational needs were met by 86 primary schools (29 private), 30 middle schools (9 private), and 56 pre-primary schools (36 private). In higher education there was the private Centro Universitario de Sete Lagoas, the private Faculdade Cenecista de Sete Lagoas, a campus of the private Faculdade Promove de Sete Lagoas, the private Faculdade Ciências da Vida - FCV, the private Faculdade Sete Lagoas de Minas Gerais - FSLMG, and the private Faculdade Setelagoana de Ciências Gerenciais - FASCIG. See Mundo Vestibular. The city also has a campus of the Universidade Federal de Sao João Del Rei where approximately 300 students are attending Food and Agronomic Engineering in a partnership with the Embrapa Maize and Sorghum.

== History ==
Evidence of pre-Columbian presence has been found in the Gruta Rei do Mato (Cave of the Forest King).

From around 1700, colonists entered Minas Gerais in search of gold, gems and diamonds. Nowadays, the Santa Luzia quarter is unofficially still called "o garimpo" (meaning "the goldmine").

Between 1780 and 1867, the name 'Sete Lagoas' was used for several regional types of administrations. The municipality of Sete Lagoas was founded in 1867.

Although "Sete Lagoas" means "Seven Lakes", there are currently more than seven lakes in Sete Lagoas (10 within the urban perimeter, 17 in the municipality). Some were dug out while others became part of the town when the town expanded. There are, however, 7 'official' lakes according to a municipal law from 1989. These are: Lagoa da Boa Vista, Lagoa da Catarina, Lagoa da Chácara, Lagoa do Cercadinho, Lagoa José Felix, Lagoa do Matadouro and Lagoa Paulino.

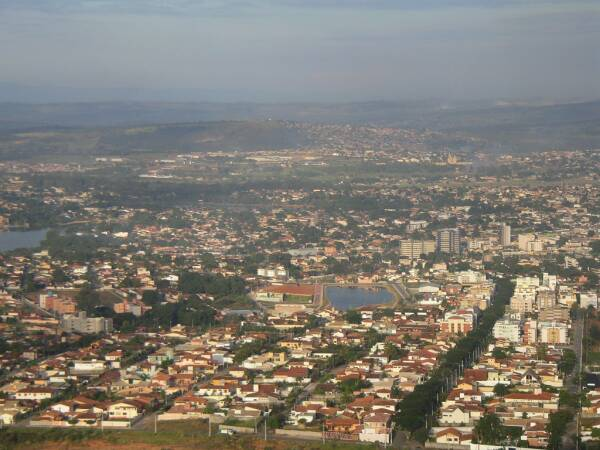
Aerial view of the city of Sete Lagoas

== Food ==
Food is an important element of the culture of Minas Gerais. In Sete Lagoas, two dishes can be found that are hardly found elsewhere: Galopé and Muchacho. Galopé is a dish of chicken (galo) and pork feet (pé de porco). Muchacho is also composed of chicken and pork but it also contains cheese.

== Sports ==
Bela Vista Futebol Clube is one of 4 relevant football team in the city. Also is known for being the only football team from Sete Lagoas to tour over Europe in the 1959. Despite severe issues throughout the tour, the club reached some highlights scores in matches such as against Real Madrid in Santiago Bernabéu.

Democrata Futebol Clube is a football club based in Sete Lagoas. The club plays its home matches at the Arena do Jacaré ("Alligator Arena", so named because of Democrata's mascot; the official name is Joaquim Henrique Nogueira stadium).

Both teams used to play the traditional "sete-lagoano" derby being a very famous and known as the "Clássico dos sertões" ( Countryside's Derby ). An interesting fact about both was its old home arenas: it was only one block distance from each, which was an extra spice for the rivality. The old Democrata's Arena was demolished, but the original and glorious BV arena is still there.

In 2010 and 2011, Arena do Jacaré served as a home stadium for Atlético Mineiro, Cruzeiro and América-MG, as both Belo Horizonte stadia - Mineirão and Independência - were going through reforms.

Other smaller, but very competitive clubs are Ideal Sport Club, América Futebol Clube.

== See also ==
- List of municipalities in Minas Gerais
