= Greater Belo Horizonte =

Metropolitan Region of Belo Horizonte Região Metropolitana de Belo Horizonte
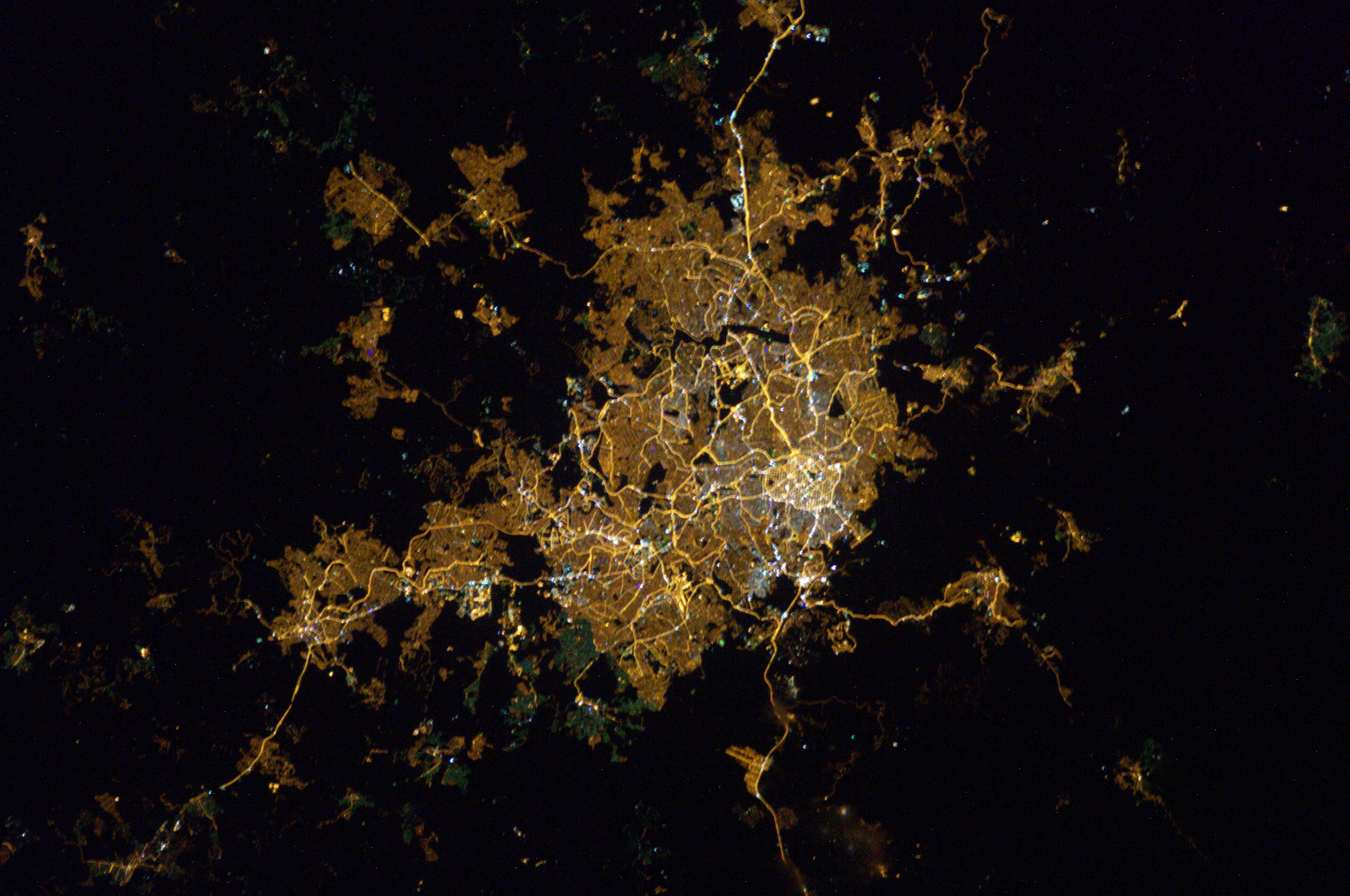
- Satellite image of Belo Horizonte and greater area by night
- Nickname: Greater Belo Horizonte
- Coordinates: 19°55′S 43°56′W
- Country: Brazil
- State: Minas Gerais

Population (2020)
  - Total: 6,006,887 (3rd)
- Time zone: UTC-3 (BRT)

Greater Belo Horizonte is the name usually used to describe the Belo Horizonte metropolitan region, which is composed of 34 municipalities. As of 2013, it is the third largest metropolitan area of Brazil with more than six million inhabitants; the largest city by population is Belo Horizonte.

== Cities ==
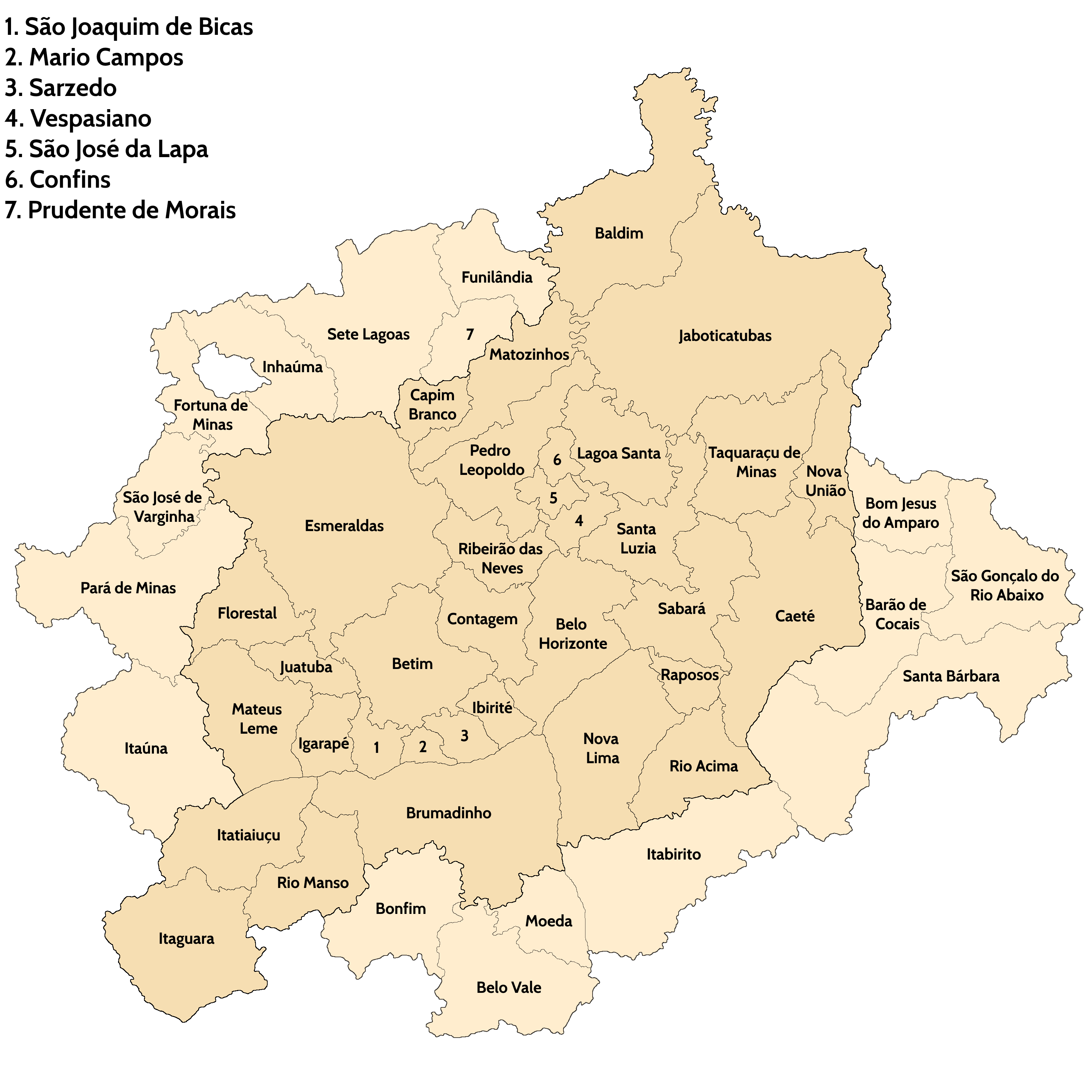
The Metropolitan Region of Belo Horizonte and the metropolitan belt

In total, 34 municipalities are part of the Belo Horizonte Metropolitan area: Baldim, Belo Horizonte, Betim, Brumadinho, Caeté, Capim Branco, Confins, Contagem, Esmeraldas, Florestal, Ibirité, Igarapé, Itaguara, Itatiaiuçu, Jaboticatubas, Nova União, Juatuba, Lagoa Santa, Mário Campos, Mateus Leme, Matozinhos, Nova Lima, Pedro Leopoldo, Raposos, Ribeirão das Neves, Rio Acima, Rio Manso, Sabará, Santa Luzia, São Joaquim de Bicas, São José da Lapa, Sarzedo, Taquaraçu de Minas, Vespasiano.

=== Metropolitan belt ===
The metropolitan belt (Portuguese: Colar Metropolitano) of the Belo Horizonte metropolitan area is composed of 16 municipalities: Barão de Cocais, Belo Vale, Bom Jesus do Amparo, Bonfim, Fortuna de Minas, Funilândia, Inhaúma, Itabirito, Itaúna, Moeda, Pará de Minas, Prudente de Morais, Santa Bárbara, São Gonçalo do Rio Abaixo, São José da Varginha and Sete Lagoas.
