= Carste de Lagoa Santa Environmental Protection Area =

Protected area in Minas Gerais, Brazil

- Área de Proteção Ambiental Carste de Lagoa Santa
- IUCN category V (protected landscape/seascape)
- Location within Brazil
- Nearest city: Belo Horizonte, Minas Gerais
- Coordinates: 19.534°S 43.986°W
- Area: 39,957 hectares (98,740 acres)
- Designation: Environmental Protection Area
- Created: 25 January 1990

Tree frog on a bromeliad, Carste da Lagoa Santa Environmental Protection Area, Francisco Borges Morais, Brazil.

Carste de Lagoa Santa Environmental Protection Area (Portuguese: Área de Proteção Ambiental Carste de Lagoa Santa is a protected area in Minas Gerais, Brazil.

== Location ==
The protected area in the Cerrado biome, which covers 39,957 hectares (98,740 acres), was created on 25 January 1990. It is administered by the Chico Mendes Institute for Biodiversity Conservation. The objective is to protect biological diversity, manage the impact of human occupation and ensure the sustainable use of natural resources. The area covers parts of the municipalities of Confins, Lagoa Santa, Matozinhos, Funilândia, Pedro Leopoldo and Prudente de Morais in Minas Gerais.

== Conservation ==
The Carste de Lagoa Santa Environmental Protection Area is classed as IUCN protected area category V: protected landscape/seascape. Protected species include fossorial giant rat (Kunsia fronto), ocelot (Leopardus pardalis mitis) and orange-brown Atlantic tree-rat (Phyllomys brasiliensis). It includes the Sumidouro State Park, which protects an area containing limestone caves where remains of early humans have been found.

== Sources ==
- Àrea de Proteção Ambiental Carste de Lagoa Santa (in Portuguese), Chico Mendes Institute for Biodiversity Conservation
- "Parque Estadual do Sumidouro", Descubra Minas (in Portuguese), SENAC Minas, archived from the original on 2016-12-20
- Unidade de Conservação: Área de Proteção Ambiental Carste de Lagoa Santa (in Portuguese), MMA: Ministério do Meio Ambiente
