= Clara Nunes =

Brazilian singer

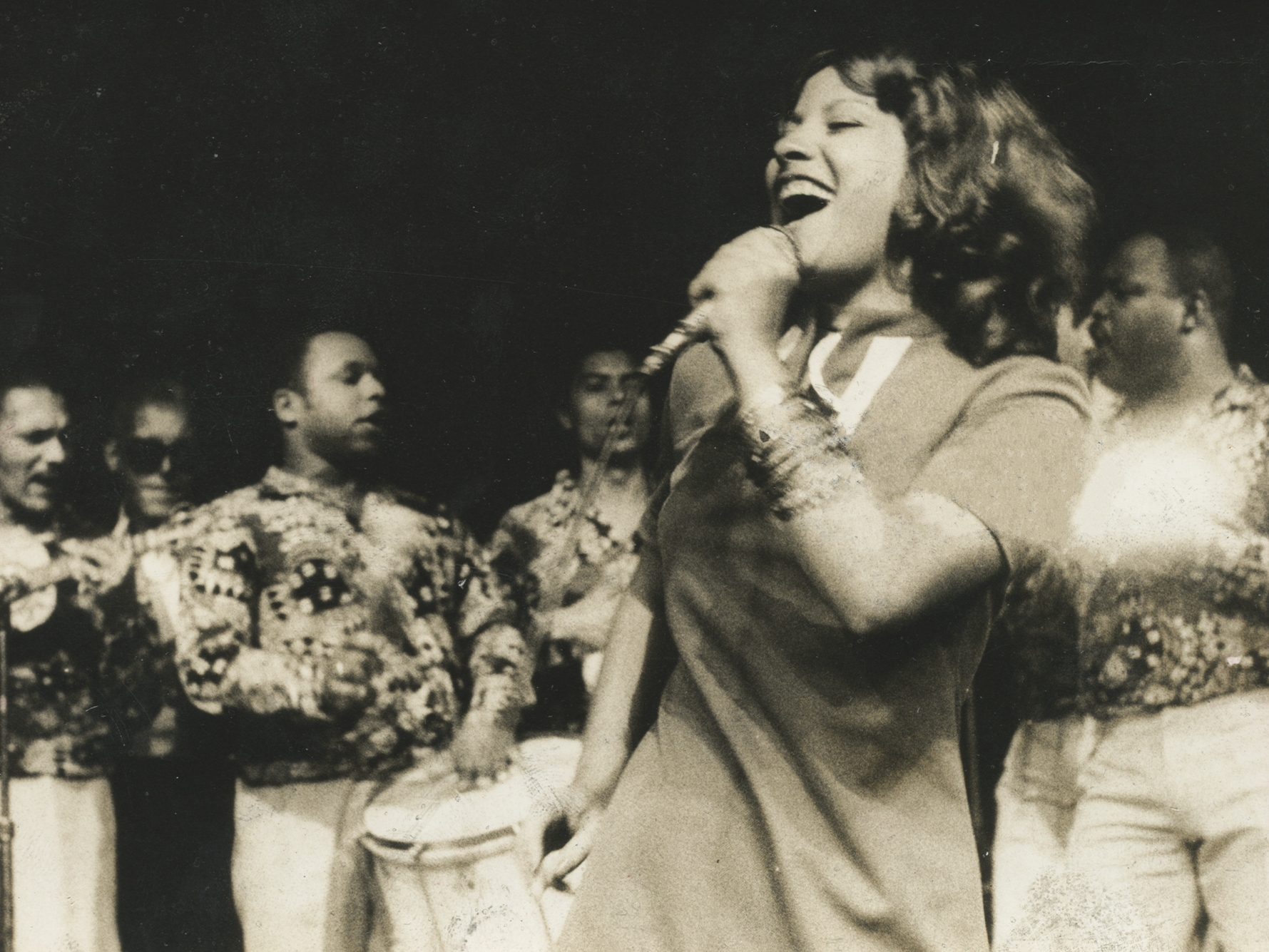
- Clara Nunes, 1971. National Archives of Brazil.

Background information
- Also known as: Guerreira (Warrior)
- Born: Clara Francisca Gonçalves; August 12, 1942; Caetanopolis, Minas Gerais, Brazil
- Died: April 2, 1983 (aged 40) Rio de Janeiro, Brazil
- Genres: Samba, MPB
- Years active: 1960 – 1983

Clara Nunes (Portuguese pronunciation: [ˈklaɾɐ ˈnunis], August 12, 1942 – April 2, 1983) was a Brazilian samba and MPB singer, considered one of the greatest of her generation. She was the first female singer in Brazil to sell over 100,000 copies of a record, with "Tristeza Pé No Chão" and her achievements in the samba genre earned her the title of "Queen of Samba".

She had an enormous success with samba songs written by composers such as Nelson Cavaquinho, Paulinho da Viola and Chico Buarque, in addition to songs devoted to orishas and Portela, her favorite samba school. Among her hits, recorded in 16 solo albums, are "Você passa, eu acho graça" (1968), "Ê baiana" (1971), "Conto de areia" (1974), "O mar serenou" (1975), "Coração leviano" (1977), "Na linha do mar" (1979), "Morena de Angola" (1980), and "Nação" (1982). At the peak of her career, Nunes would sell more than a million copies of each album she released.

Nunes was also a researcher of the rhythms and folklore of Brazilian popular music, and traveled several times to Africa to search for the roots of black music. Familiar with Afro-Brazilian dances and traditions, she converted to Candomblé in her later life. On April 2, 1983, she died at age 40 after suffering from anaphylaxis during a surgery to treat varicose veins. Even today she remains one of the most popular singers in Brazil.

== Biography ==
=== Early life ===
Clara Francisca Gonçalves was born on August 12, 1942, in Cedro, Paraopeba, Minas Gerais,^{1} where she lived until the age of 16. She was the youngest child of Manuel Pereira de Araújo, and Amélia Gonçalves Nunes. Her father was a joiner in the Cedro & Cachoeira textile mill, and was known in the town as Mané Serrador.^{2} He was also a violeiro and a participant in the local Festival of the Three Kings. Manuel died in 1944, and soon after, the young Clara would also lose her mother. Orphaned, she would be raised by her older sister Dindinha (Maria Gonçalves) and brother José (known as Zé Chilau). At that time, Clara attended catechism classes in the Church of the Eucharistic Crusade. There, she also sang litanies in Latin in the church choir.

According to her own words, she grew up listening to Carmen Costa, Ângela Maria, and especially Elizeth Cardoso and Dalva de Oliveira, the latter who had always been a big influence on her music, even though she kept a unique style. In 1952, as a young girl, Clara won her first singing contest, held in her hometown, performing "Recuerdos de Ypacaraí". As a prize, she won a blue dress. At age 14, Clara became a weaver in the Cedro & Cachoeira factory, the same in which her father had also been an employee.

At age 16, she moved to Belo Horizonte after her brother Zé Chilau killed her boyfriend in 1957. In the state capital, Clara lived with her sister Vicentina and her brother Joaquim. There, she worked as a weaver by day and attended school by night. On weekends, Clara participated in the rehearsals of the Renaissance Choir, at the church in the neighborhood where she lived. At that time, she met guitar player Jadir Ambrósio, known for having composed the anthem of Cruzeiro. Admired for her voice, he took Clara to sing in several local radio programs, such as Degraus da Fama, in which she performed under the name of Clara Francisca.

=== Name change and early success ===
In the early 1960s, Clara also met Aurino Araújo (brother of Eduardo Araújo), who introduced her to many artists. Aurino would also be her boyfriend for ten years. The record producer Cid Carvalho persuaded her to change her stage name to Clara Nunes, using her mother's maiden name. She would change her name once again, becoming Clara Francisca Gonçalves Pinheiro after her marriage.

In 1960, still working as a weaver, she won the Minas Gerais stage of a contest named "The Golden Voice of ABC", performing "Serenata do Adeus", composed by Vinícius de Moraes and previously recorded by Elizeth Cardoso. In the national stage of the competition, held in São Paulo, she came in third place with the song "Só Adeus" (composed by Jair Amorim and Evaldo Gouveia).

Thereafter, Clara Nunes began singing at Rádio Inconfidência in Belo Horizonte. For three consecutive years she was named the best radio singer of Minas Gerais. She also began to perform as a crooner in nightclubs and bars in the state capital, later working with then bassist Milton Nascimento, then known as Bituca. At that time, she made her first appearance on television, performing on Hebe Camargo's show in Belo Horizonte. In 1963, Clara Nunes got her own TV show on Belo Horizonte's Itacolomi channel, titled Clara Nunes Presents. In the program, which aired for a year and a half, she received famous artists such as Altemar Dutra and Ângela Maria as guests.

Following the end of her TV show, in 1965, Clara moved to the Copacabana neighborhood in Rio de Janeiro to pursue a national career as singer.

=== First recordings ===
After a few LPs featuring assorted styles, she became a samba vocalist in the 1970s and became well known. In 1974, Clara had a hit with the samba "Conto de Areia" and her album sold approximately 300,000 copies. It was a remarkable achievement which helped to overturn the idea that women were unable to become big record sellers (in Brazil) and thereby stimulated other companies to invest in other female samba musicians, such as Alcione and Beth Carvalho. In 1975, she toured Europe.

The following albums transformed her into one of the "three samba queens" of her time, along with the two above-mentioned musicians. In the second half of the decade, she released one album every year, all of them selling well and featuring historic tracks such as "Juízo Final", "Coração Leviano" and "Morena de Angola". Other hits were "Você Passa e Eu Acho Graça", "Ê Baiana", "Ilu Ayê - Terra da Vida", "Tristeza, Pé no Chão", "A Deusa dos Orixás", "Macunaíma", "O Mar Serenou", "As Forças da Natureza", "Guerreira", "Feira de Mangaio", "Portela na Avenida" and "Nação".

Clara was also famous for songs crafted from the rhythms of Umbanda, her Afro-Brazilian religion, and for her typical costumes, as she always dressed in white and wore many necklaces and African beads.

=== Death ===
On March 5, 1983, Clara Nunes underwent a seemingly simple surgery to treat varicose veins, but ended up having an allergic reaction to one of the components of the anesthetic. Clara suffered a cardiac arrest and remained hospitalized for 28 days in Clínica São Vicente's Intensive Care Unit. Meanwhile, the singer was the victim of a series of speculations that circulated in the media over her hospital admission, including "artificial insemination, abortion, suicide attempt, and spousal abuse by her husband". A similar episode occurred after the death of her friend, singer Elis Regina, in the previous year.

In the morning of April 2, 1983 – a Holy Saturday – Clara Nunes was officially declared dead, at the age of 40, victim of an anaphylactic shock. The inquiry opened by the Regional Medical Council of Rio de Janeiro to investigate whether there was medical negligence in the case was filed, which would increase speculation about her cause of death. The singer's funeral was attended by more than 50,000 people in the court of the Portela Samba School. Her burial at Cemitério São João Batista was accompanied by a crowd of fans and friends. In her honor, the street in Oswaldo Cruz where Portela is located was named after her.

== Discography ==
=== Albums ===
- 1966 A voz adorável de Clara Nunes
- 1968 Você passa eu acho graça
- 1969 A beleza que canta
- 1971 Clara Nunes
- 1972 Clara Clarice Clara
- 1973 Clara Nunes
- 1973 Poeta, Moça e Violão (with Vinicius de Moraes e Toquinho)
- 1974 Brasileiro Profissão Esperança (with Paulo Gracindo)
- 1974 Alvorecer
- 1975 Claridade
- 1976 Canto das três raças
- 1977 Forças da natureza
- 1978 Guerreira
- 1979 Esperança
- 1980 Brasil Mestiço
- 1981 Clara
- 1982 Nação

== Notes ==
1.At the time of her birth, the Cedro district was part of the Paraopeba municipality, but then was emancipated and became a city of its own, under the name of Caetanópolis.

2.Mané is a popular nickname for Manuel, while Serrador means "sawyer" in Portuguese.

== General references ==
- (in Portuguese) Fernandes, Vagner. Clara Nunes: guerreira da utopia. Ediouro Publicações. 2007. Portions available on Google Books.
