= List of Latin American cities by GDP (PPP) =

This is a list of the top 25 Latin American cities or metropolitan areas by gross domestic product (GDP), purchasing power parity (PPP). The United Nations recognizes three distinct ways to define a city, as not all cities meet the same classification standards. A city can be identified by its administrative boundaries, the spread of its urbanized zone, or the reach of its metropolitan area. Venezuela is not shown due to the lack of relevant data.

== Table ==
Latin American Cities by GDP (PPP) - (Constant 2015 values)
Rank	City proper/metropolitan area	Country/region	GDP (PPP) 2023 est. (US$ Billions)	Metropolitan population (2023 est.)
1	Greater São Paulo	Brazil	$531.3	22,620,000
2	Greater Mexico City	Mexico	$520.6	22,281,000
3	Greater Buenos Aires	Argentina	$356.8	15,490,000
4	Greater Rio de Janeiro	Brazil	$285.9	13,728,000
5	Metropolitan Area of Bogotá	Colombia	$252.8	11,508,000
6	Lima Metropolitan Area	Peru	$210.4	11,204,000
7	Santiago Metropolitan Region	Chile	$192.3	6,903,000
8	Monterrey Metropolitan Area	Mexico	$190.3	5,117,000
9	Guadalajara Metropolitan Area	Mexico	$123.8	5,420,000
10	Brasília	Brazil	$123.4	4,873,000
11	Greater Belo Horizonte	Brazil	$84.8	6,248,000
12	Metropolitan Region of Curitiba	Brazil	$77.8	3,813,000
13	Greater Porto Alegre	Brazil	$77.7	4,212,000
14	Greater Santo Domingo	Dominican Republic	$73.7	3,524,000
15	Medellín	Colombia	$72.6	4,102,000
16	Metropolitan Region of Campinas	Brazil	$66.1	3,423,000
17	Panama City	Panama	$65.8	1,977,000
18	Greater Asunción	Paraguay	$64.7	3,569,000
19	Tijuana Metropolitan Area	Mexico	$61.0	2,260,000
20	Torreón	Mexico	$54.9	1,780,000 (2023 est.)
21	Puebla Metropolitan Area	Mexico	$53.8	3,345,000
22	Greater Salvador	Brazil	$49.0	3,958,000
23	Guatemala City Metropolitan Area	Guatemala	$48.1	3,095,000
24	Greater Recife	Brazil	$47.2	4,264,000
25	Cali	Colombia	$45.9	2,864,000
