= Paraopeba =

Municipality of Minas Gerais, Brazil

Coordinates: 19°16′26″S 44°24′14″W

- Municipality
- Flag Coat of arms
- Interactive map of Paraopeba
- Country: Brazil
- State: Minas Gerais
- Region: Southeast

Population (2022 Census)
  - Total: 24,107
  - Estimate (2025): 24,899
- Time zone: UTC−3 (BRT)

Location of Paraopeba on a map of the state of Minas Gerais

Paraopeba is a Brazilian municipality located in the northeast of the state of Minas Gerais. Its population as of 2025 was 24,899 people living in a total area of 625 square kilometres (241 sq mi). The city belongs to the meso-region of Metropolitana de Belo Horizonte and to the micro-region of Sete Lagoas. It became a municipality in 1911.

== Geography ==
The city center of Paraopeba is located at an elevation of 733 metres (2,405 ft) on the important federal highway BR-040 north of Sete Lagoas. Neighboring municipalities are: Curvelo (N), Cordisburgo (NE), Araçaí, (E), Sete Lagoas (SE), Caetanópolis and Inhaúma (S), Papagaios (W).

Distances

- Belo Horizonte: 100 km south on BR-040
- Sete Lagoas: 26 km south on BR-040
- Cordisburgo: 24 km northeast on MG-231

== Economy ==
Services, agriculture, and small industries are the main economic activities. The GDP in 2005 was approximately R$172 million, with 18 million reais from taxes, 98 million reais from services, 35 million reais from industry, and 20 million reais from agriculture. There were 518 rural producers on 150,000 hectares of land (2006). Approximately 2,200 persons were occupied in agriculture. The main crops are citrus fruits, sugarcane, rice, beans, and corn. There were 32,000 head of cattle, of which 8,000 were milk cows (2006). Only 108 of the rural properties had tractors in 2006.

Of the working force there were 1,316 workers in 113 small industries, 1,166 workers in 434 retail units, and 628 workers in public administration (2006).

There were 2 banks (2007). In the vehicle fleet there were 2,807 automobiles, 362 trucks, 359 pickup trucks, 42 buses, and 929 motorcycles (2007).

== Health and education ==
In the health sector there were 10 health establishments, which included 5 public health clinics, and 4 private clinics (2005). There was 1 private hospital with 29 beds. Educational needs of 5,600 students were met by 13 primary schools, 3 middle schools, and 7 pre-primary schools.

- Municipal Human Development Index: 0.767 (2000)
- State ranking: 184 out of 853 municipalities as of 2000
- National ranking: 1,410 out of 5,138 municipalities as of 2000
- Literacy rate: 90%
- Life expectancy: 70 (average of males and females)

In 2000 the per capita monthly income of R$216.00 was below the state average of R$276.00 and below the national average of R$297.00. Poços de Caldas had the highest per capita monthly income in 2000 with R$435.00. The lowest was Setubinha with R$73.00.

The highest ranking municipality in Minas Gerais in 2000 was Poços de Caldas with 0.841, while the lowest was Setubinha with 0.568. Nationally the highest was São Caetano do Sul in São Paulo with 0.919, while the lowest was Setubinha. In more recent statistics (considering 5,507 municipalities) Manari in the state of Pernambuco has the lowest rating in the country—0,467—putting it in last place.

== See also ==
- List of municipalities in Minas Gerais
