= Araçaí =

Municipality of Brazil

Coordinates: 19°11′56″S 44°14′52″W

- Municipality
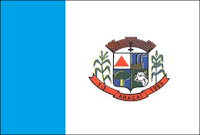
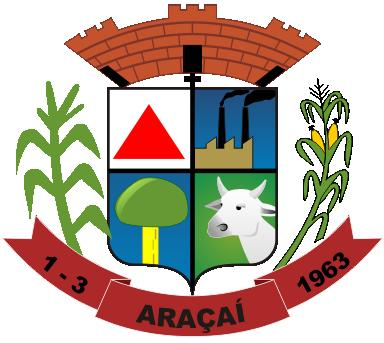
- Flag Coat of arms
- Interactive map of Araçaí
- Country: Brazil
- State: Minas Gerais
- Region: Southeast

Population (2022 Census)
  - Total: 2,181
  - Estimate (2025): 2,222
- Time zone: UTC−3 (BRT)

Location of Araçaí on a map of the state of Minas Gerais

Araçaí is a Brazilian municipality located in the northeast of the state of Minas Gerais. Its population as of 2025 was 2,222 people living in a total area of 187 km^{2} (72 sq mi). The city belongs to the meso-region of Metropolitana de Belo Horizonte and to the micro-region of Sete Lagoas. It became a municipality in 1962.

== Geography ==
The city center of Araçaí is located at an elevation of 739 meters directly north of Sete Lagoas. Neighboring municipalities are: Cordisburgo (N), Jequitibá (E), Sete Lagoas (S), and Paraopeba (W).

Distances

- Belo Horizonte: 108 km south on MG-231 then BR-040
- Paraopeba: 25 km
- Sete Lagoas: 43 km
- Cordisburgo: 17 km

== Economy ==
Services, mining, agriculture, and small industries are the main economic activities. The main industries are textile and dairy products. The GDP in 2005 was approximately R$13 million, with 1 million reais from taxes, 7 million reais from services, 2 million reais from industry, and 3 million reais from agriculture. There were 113 rural producers on 141,000 hectares of land (2006). Approximately 350 persons were occupied in agriculture. The main crops are rice, beans, and corn. There were 7,800 head of cattle, of which 800 were milk cows (2006). Only 34 of the rural properties had tractors in 2006.

There were no banks (2007). In the vehicle fleet there were 150 automobiles, 13 trucks, 15 pickup trucks, 3 buses, and 45 motorcycles (2007).

== Health and education ==
In the health sector there were 4 health establishments (2005). Educational needs of 680 students were met by 2 primary schools, 1 middle school, and 1 pre-primary school.

- Municipal Human Development Index: 0.748 (2000)
- State ranking: 296 out of 853 municipalities as of 2000
- National ranking: 1,926 out of 5,138 municipalities as of 2000
- Literacy rate: 91%
- Life expectancy: 69 (average of males and females)

In 2000 the per capita monthly income of R$173.00 was below the state average of R$276.00 and below the national average of R$297.00. Poços de Caldas had the highest per capita monthly income in 2000 with R$435.00. The lowest was Setubinha with R$73.00.

The highest ranking municipality in Minas Gerais in 2000 was Poços de Caldas with 0.841, while the lowest was Setubinha with 0.568. Nationally the highest was São Caetano do Sul in São Paulo with 0.919, while the lowest was Setubinha. In more recent statistics (considering 5,507 municipalities) Manari in the state of Pernambuco has the lowest rating in the country—0,467—putting it in last place.

== See also ==
- List of municipalities in Minas Gerais
