= Bartolomeu Campos de Queirós =

Bartolomeu Campos de Queirós (1944-2012) was a Brazilian writer and pedagogue. He was born in Pará de Minas, Minas Gerais, and grew up in the Minas Gerais towns of Papagaios and Pitangui. He was educated in Divinópolis, Juiz de Fora, and Belo Horizonte, and with a UN scholarship, studied philosophy in Paris. His first book The Fish and the Bird appeared in 1971. Other notable titles include Pedro (1977), Ciganos (1982), Ah! Mar (1985), Mário (1982), Onde Tem Bruxa Tem Fada (1979), and Vermelho Amargo (2011).

He died in Belo Horizonte in 2012.
