= Comunidade dos Arturos =

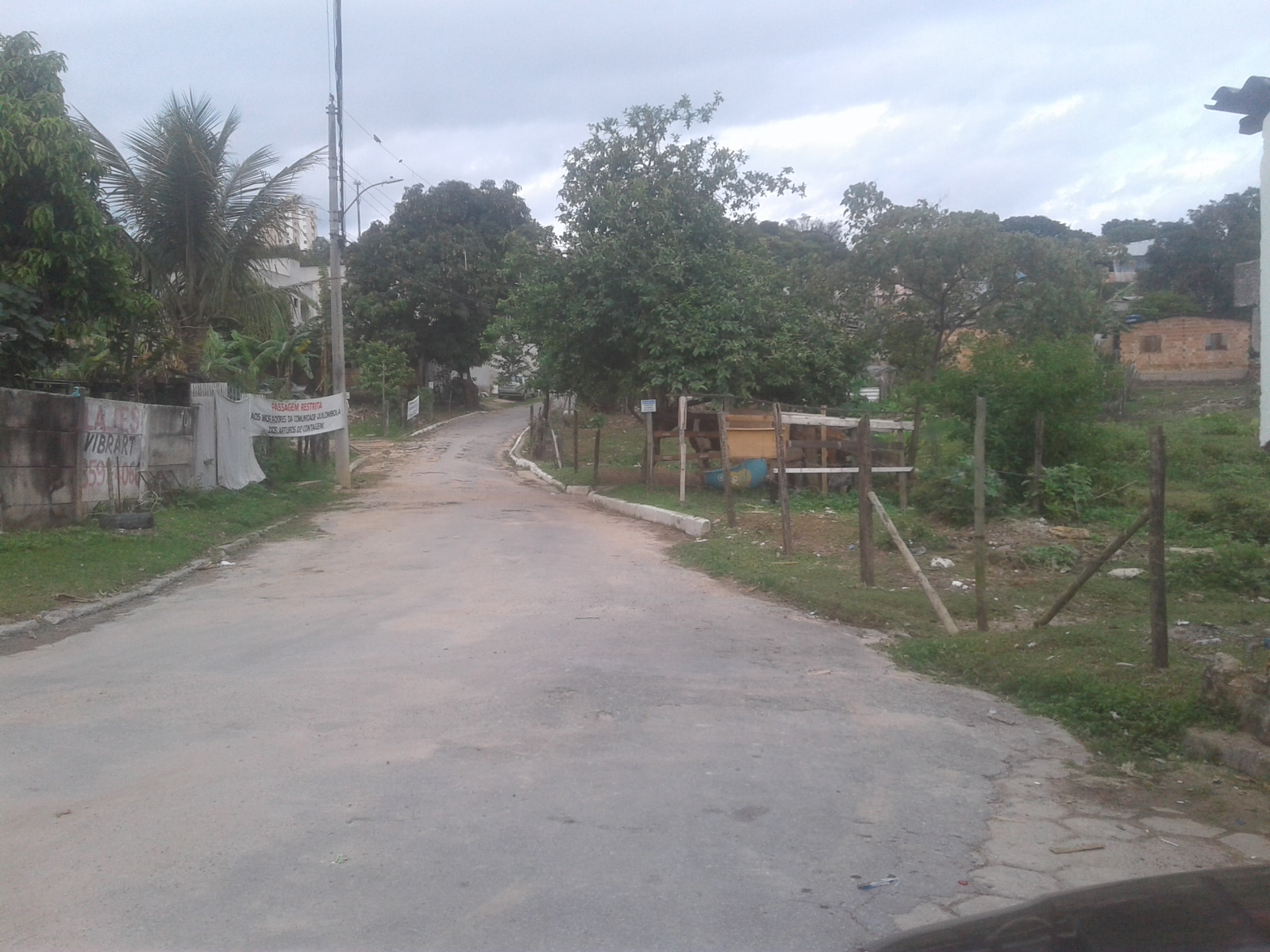
Community of Arturos

The Community of Arturos is a community made up of the descendants of a former slave named Artur; Hence the name Arturos. They preserve their culture and religiosity through the Congados. It is headquartered in Contagem, in the Metropolitan Region of Belo Horizonte .

== Origin ==
The Arturos descend from Artur Camilo Silvério and his wife Carmelinda Maria da Silva . They are black people, descendants of slaves, who live in a place called "Domingos Pereira", close to the Contagem Center. The community currently has 600 inhabitants.

On January 9, 2026, the Mayor of Contagem signed an agreement with the Instituto Nacional de Colonização e Reforma Agrária aimed at furthering land regularization and definitive titling of the quilombola community.
