= Alvorecer =

Studio album by Clara Nunes
- Released: 1974
- Recorded: 1974
- Genre: Samba
- Label: Odeon
- Producers: Milton Miranda; assisted by Adelzon Alves

Clara Nunes chronology
| Clara Nunes (1973) | Alvorecer (1974) | Claridade (1975) |

Alvorecer is Clara Nunes seventh album released in 1974 under the label Odeon. Due to the success of the song Conto de Areia, the album sold over 500,000 copies in Brazil, making Nunes the best-selling female artist of her time.

== Track listing ==
1. "Menino Deus" (Mauro Duarte, Paulo César Pinheiro)
2. "Samba da volta" (Toquinho, Vinicius De Moraes)
3. "Sindorerê" (Antônio Candeia Filho)
4. "O que é que a baiana tem" (Dorival Caymmi)
5. "Meu sapato já furou" (Duarte, Elton Medeiros)
6. "Punhal" (Carlos Althier de Souza Lemos Escobar; A.K.A. "Guinga", Paulo César Pinheiro)
7. "Alvorecer" (Delcio Carvalho, Ivone Lara)
8. "Nanaê, Nanã Naiana" (Sidney da Conceição)
9. "Conto de areia" (Romildo Bastos, Toninho Nascimento)
10. "Pau-de-arara" (Guio De Morais, Luiz Gonzaga)
11. "Esse meu cantar" (João Nogueira)
