= Onde Tem Bruxa Tem Fada =

Onde Tem Bruxa Tem Fada (Where There is Witch, There is Fairy) is an infantile tale written by Bartolomeu Campos Queirós, published, in first edition, in 1979, by Editora Moderna.

== Synthesis ==
The book tells the story of a fairy that has come to the world to try to understand and to bypass the difficulties that was faced by children. She is arrested and then turns again into an "idea".

== Award ==
The book won the award "The Better for the Child", in 1979, by the National Foundation for the Infantile and Juvenile Book.

== Interpretation ==
"This is fairy story, but a different story. In a poetic language, the author tells the story of a fairy that returns to the nowadays world that doesn't have place for fairies anymore. The magicians or wizards and witches take part of the allegory that subtly criticizes those who don't know how to dream, who change the fantasy and pure desires for needs artificially stimulated, who only conceive a "registered, stamped, controlled" world. The children themselves, used to that, don't know how to identify their desires anymore. Although this is an elaborate criticism to modern world, the text fortunately shows us a counterpoint and a real hope light - the fact that in dreams, intimately, children know that fantasy is possible and necessary and the enchantment is more important that the magic. Beyond surveying a beautiful work with language, the book opens doors to fundamental discussions for who will be the adult of tomorrow.".

"To where does the world go without imagination and fantasy? Imagine the disappointment of Mary Heaven, a fairy that comes to earth and discovers that consumerism has dominated everyone and there is no more space to dream and fantasy! A legend full of fascinating themes, making us think of conventions imposed by progress. Would be the sacrifice of love and liberty in change to material comfort?

== See also ==
- Willy Wonka and The Chocolate Factory

== Bibliography ==
- Queirós, Bartolomeu Campos. Onde Tem Bruxa Tem Fada. Editora Moderna, 1983
