= Jadir Ambrósio =

Brazilian musician

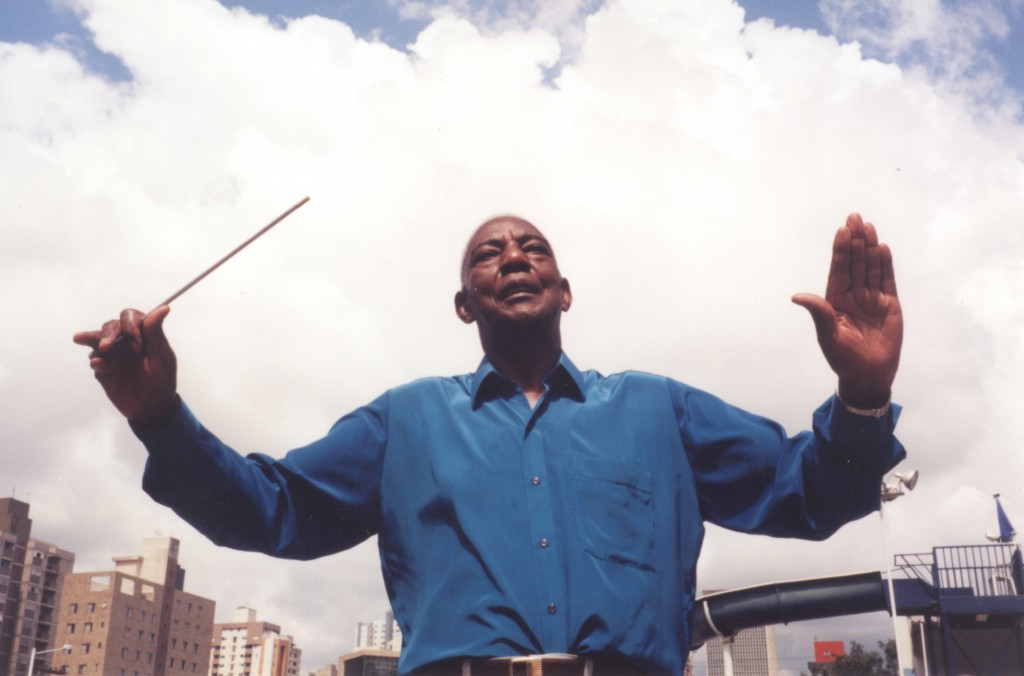
Jadir Ambrósio

Jadir Ambrósio (December 8, 1922 – September 30, 2014) was a Brazilian musician. He took a course on piano, singing, and chorus at the Conservatório Mineiro de Música in Belo Horizonte. It was the Conservatory the place chosen for the musician to distill his emotion. Where in 1965, at 43 years old, he composed the lyrics and music to the "Hino ao Campeão Cruzeiro Esporte Clube", for Cruzeiro Esporte Clube, of Minas Gerais, the team of his heart, and one of the most popular Brazilian football teams.

Jadir Ambrósio participated in many diverse musical groups. Among his works he also composed a popular samba that spoke of the love between brothers. "A música agradou e, desde então, nunca mais parei de compor," (the music pleases, and ever since (I understood that), I will never stop composing), he said. Today he has made more than 500 compositions, many of recorded for famous artists, like Luiz Gonzaga and Clara Nunes.

The musician tells: "To make an anthem for Cruzeiro one has to be a great poet. Then, I did not have these attentions. It happens that, (the song), it pleased its genre. Later, the song was played to the audiences of the radios, that when Adair Pinto had a program on the Rua São Paulo the group of the Cruzeiro Esporte Clube, the group of the Atlético Mineiro, and the group of América Futebol Clube had their anthems played there, and this was falling in the popular taste. So I usually say that this music came from God."
