= Clara Nunes (album) =

Studio album by Clara Nunes
- Released: 1973
- Recorded: 1973
- Genre: Samba; Pagode
- Label: Odeon
- Producer: Milton Miranda, Adelzon Alves

Clara Nunes chronology
Clara Clarice Clara (1972)	Clara Nunes (1973)	Alvorecer (1974)

Clara Nunes is the sixth album by Clara Nunes. Originally released in 1973, it was later reissued in 2004 as part of a Clara Nunes boxset that featured her entire discography reissued on CD for the first time.

== Track listing ==
1. "Tristeza pé no chão"
2. "Fala viola "
3. "Minha festa"
4. "Umas e outras"
5. "Pra esquecer"
6. "Arlequim de bronze"
7. "O mais que perfeito"
8. "Quando vim de Minas"
9. "Meu Carirí"
10. "Homenagem à Olinda, Recife e Pai Edu "
11. "É doce morrer no mar"
12. "Valeu pelo amor"
13. "Eu preciso de silêncio"
14. "Apesar de Você"

== See also ==
- Death of Clara Nunes
