= Santa Luzia, Minas Gerais =

Santa Luzia
- Municipality
- Municipality of Santa Luzia
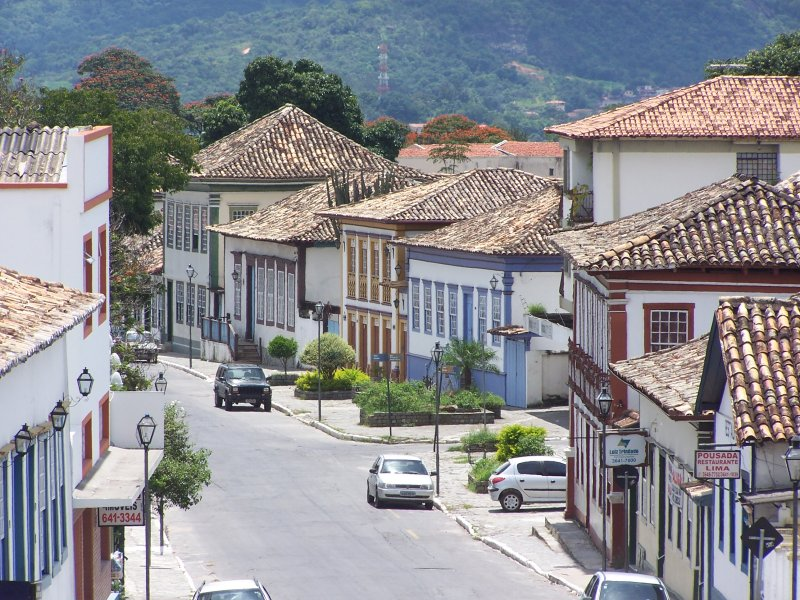
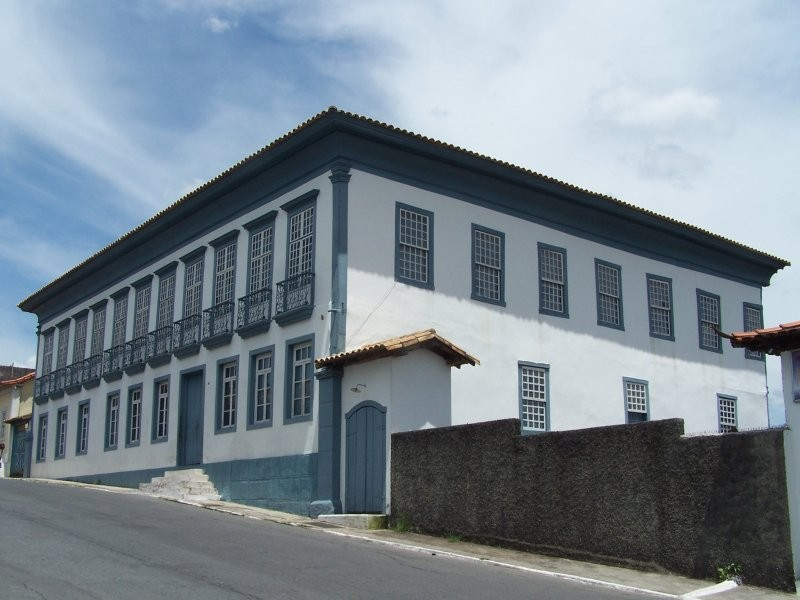
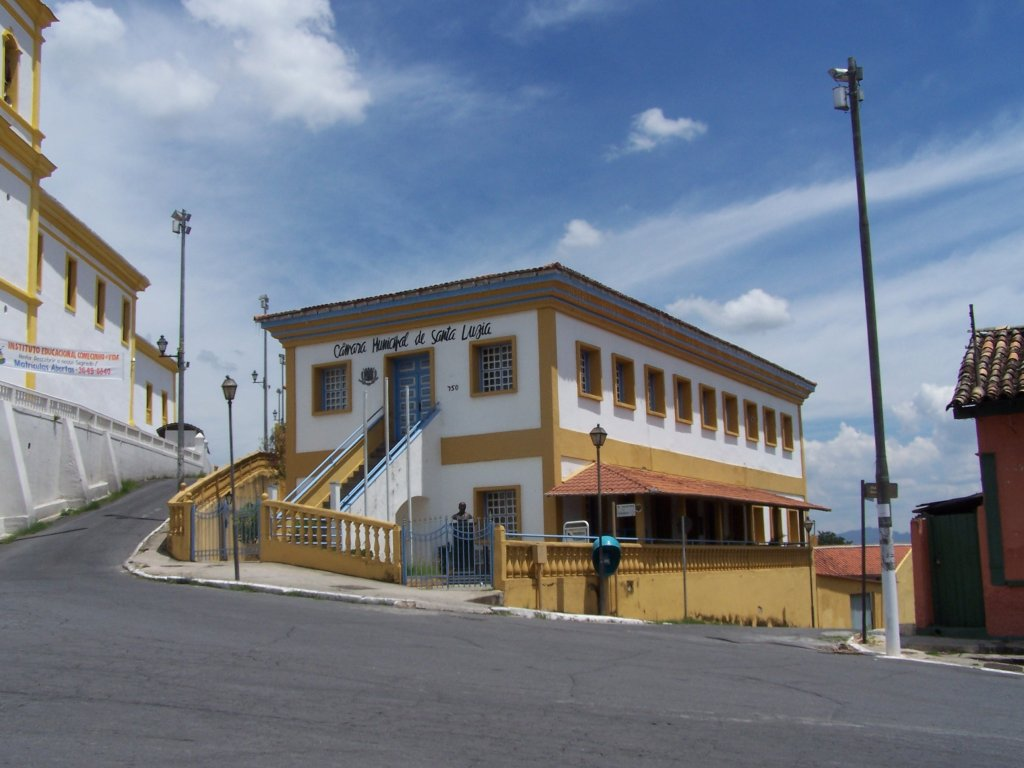
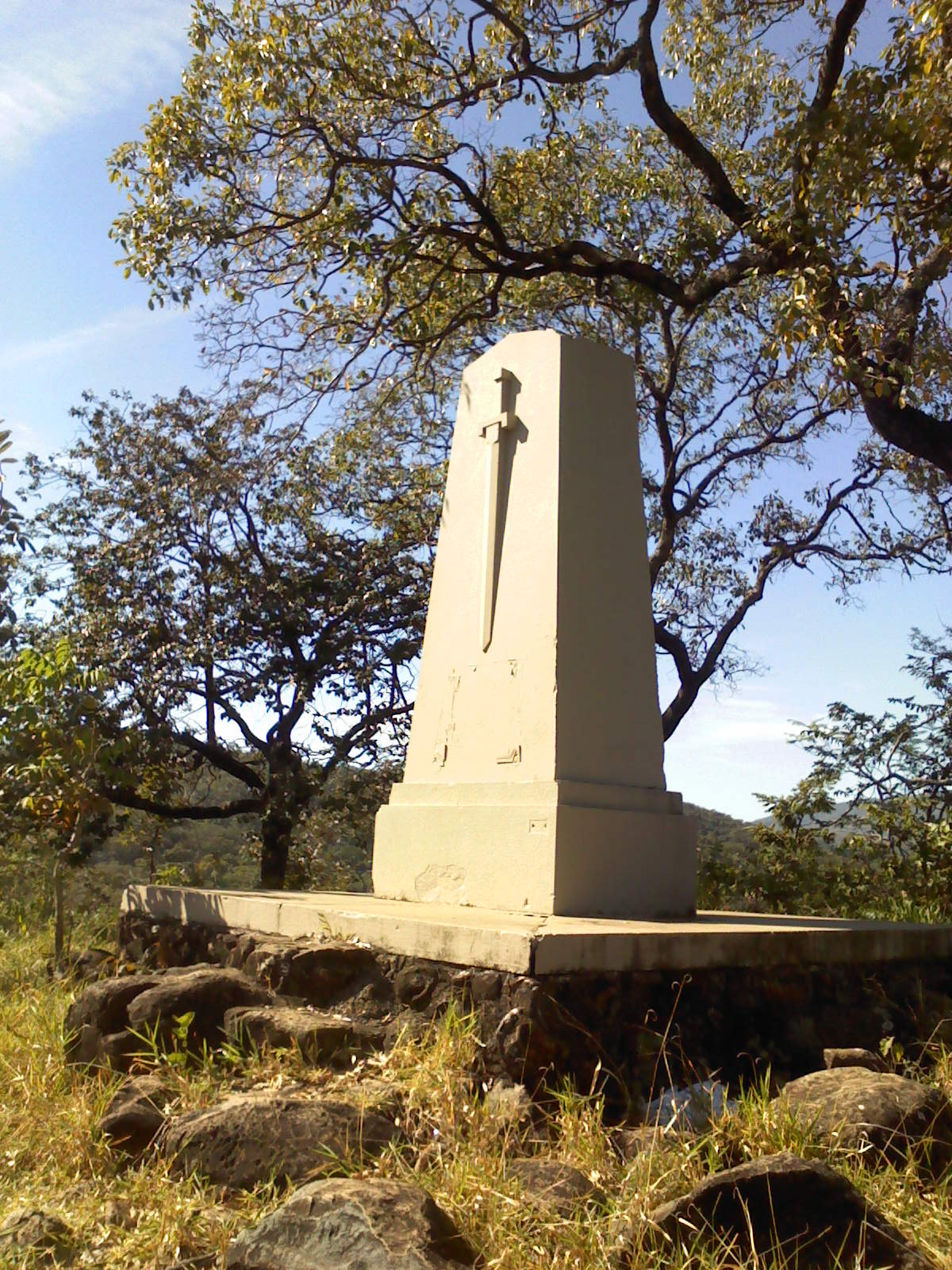
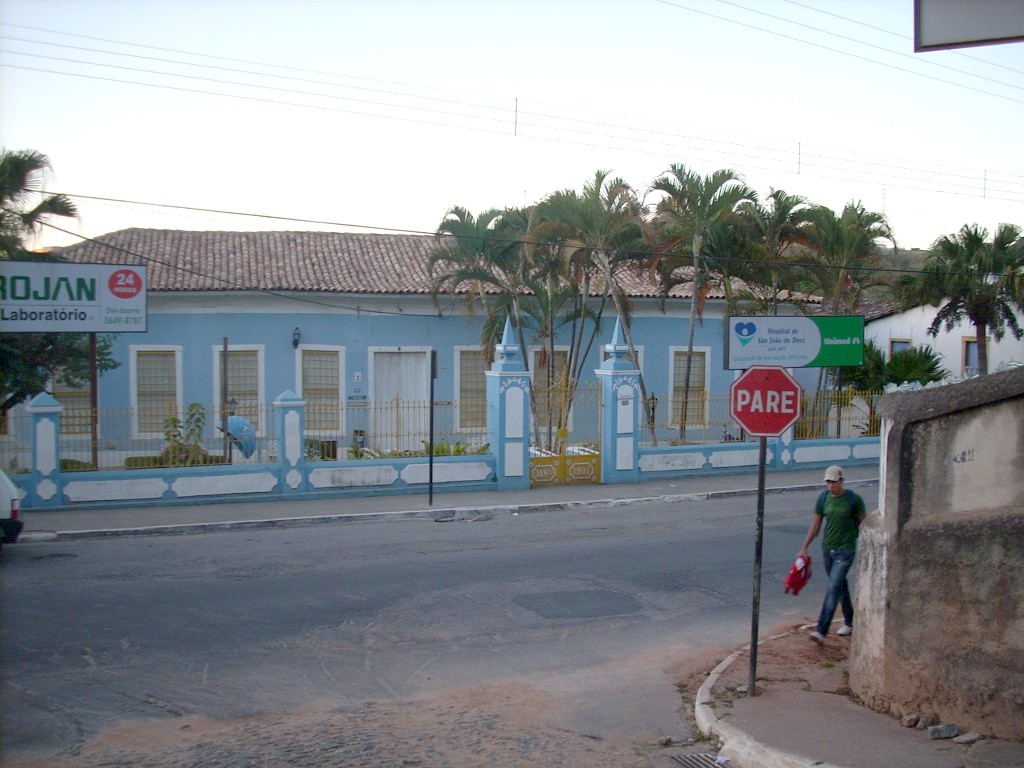
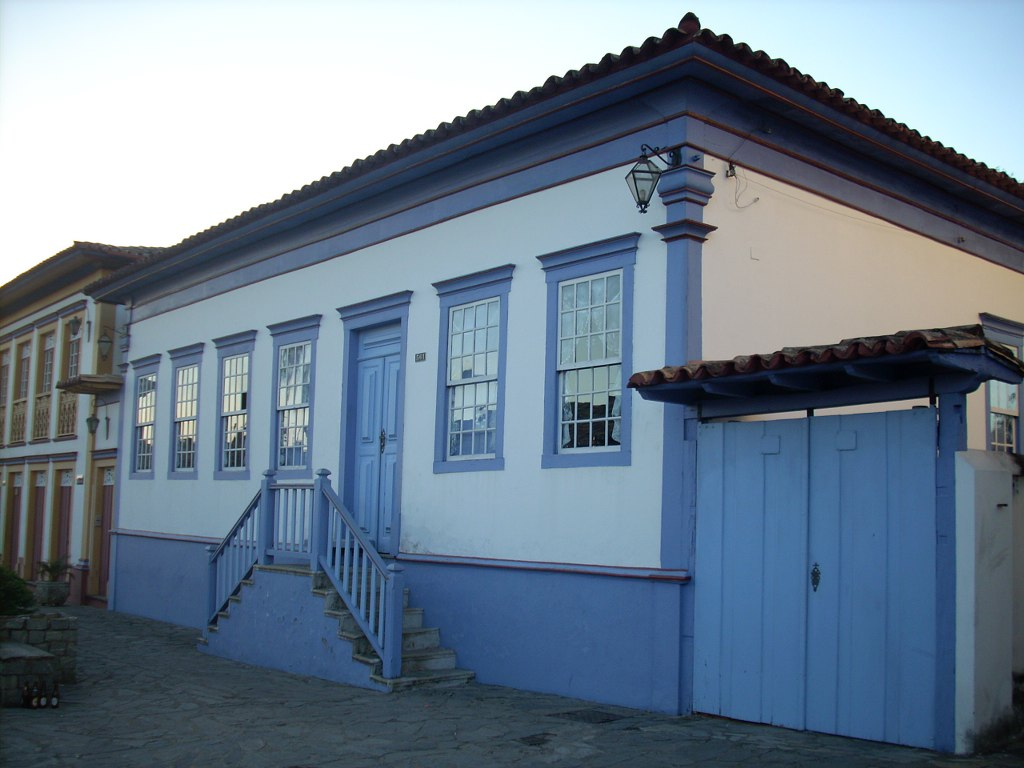

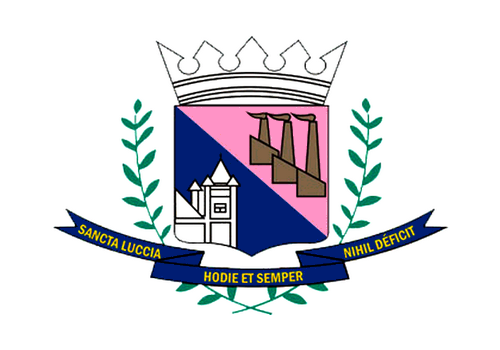
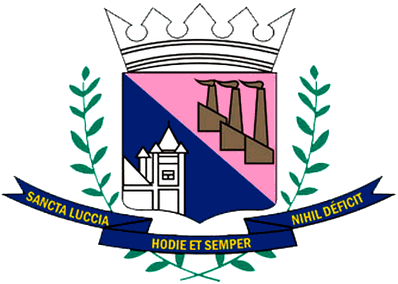
- Flag Coat of arms
- Motto: Hodie et Semper Nihil Déficit
- Location in the state of Minas Gerais

- Localization of Santa Luzia in Brazil
- Coordinates: 19°46′12″S 43°51′2″W
- Country: Brazil
- Region: Southeast
- State: Minas Gerais
- Founded: 1692
- Incorporated (as city): March 18, 1847

Government
  - Mayor: Carlos Calixto

Area
  - Municipality: 233.7 km^{2} (90.2 sq mi)
  - Urban: 35 km^{2} (14 sq mi)
- Elevation: 751 m (2,464 ft)

Population (2022 Brazilian census)
  - Municipality: 219,132
  - Estimate (2025): 230,382
  - Density: 880/km^{2} (2,300/sq mi)
- Demonym: luziense
- Time zone: UTC−3 (BRT)
- HDI (2010): 0.715 – high

Santa Luzia is a Brazilian municipality located in the state of Minas Gerais. The city belongs to the mesoregion Metropolitana de Belo Horizonte and to the microregion of Belo Horizonte. Its population in 2025 was 230,382.

== History ==
The first European settlement was established in the modern-day town in 1692 by explorers looking for gold. Santa Luzia became a village in 1847 and received its modern name in 1924.

A church, now known as the Igreja Matriz de Santa Luzia, was established in what would become Santa Luzia around 1721, which was gradually expanded through the rest of the 18th century. Several other churches were established in the city in the 1800s.

== Economy ==
In 2023, the GDP per capita of Santa Luzia was around R$30,155.

== See also ==
- List of municipalities in Minas Gerais
