= Mário Campos, Brazil =

Municipality of Brazil

Coordinates: 20°3′21″S 44°11′16″W

- Municipality
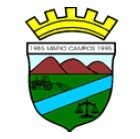
- Coat of arms
- Interactive map of Mário Campos, Brazil
- Country: Brazil
- State: Minas Gerais
- Region: Southeast

Population (2022 Census)
  - Total: 15,900
  - Estimate (2025): 16,705
- Time zone: UTC−3 (BRT)

Location of Mário Campos within Minas Gerais

Mário Campos is a Brazilian municipality located in the state of Minas Gerais. The city belongs to the mesoregion Metropolitana de Belo Horizonte and to the microregion of Belo Horizonte.

== Demographics ==
The population of Mário Campos reached approximately 16,705 in 2025.

== See also ==
- List of municipalities in Minas Gerais
