= Inhaúma, Minas Gerais =

Coordinates: 19.4908°S 44.39°W

Inhaúma
- Municipality
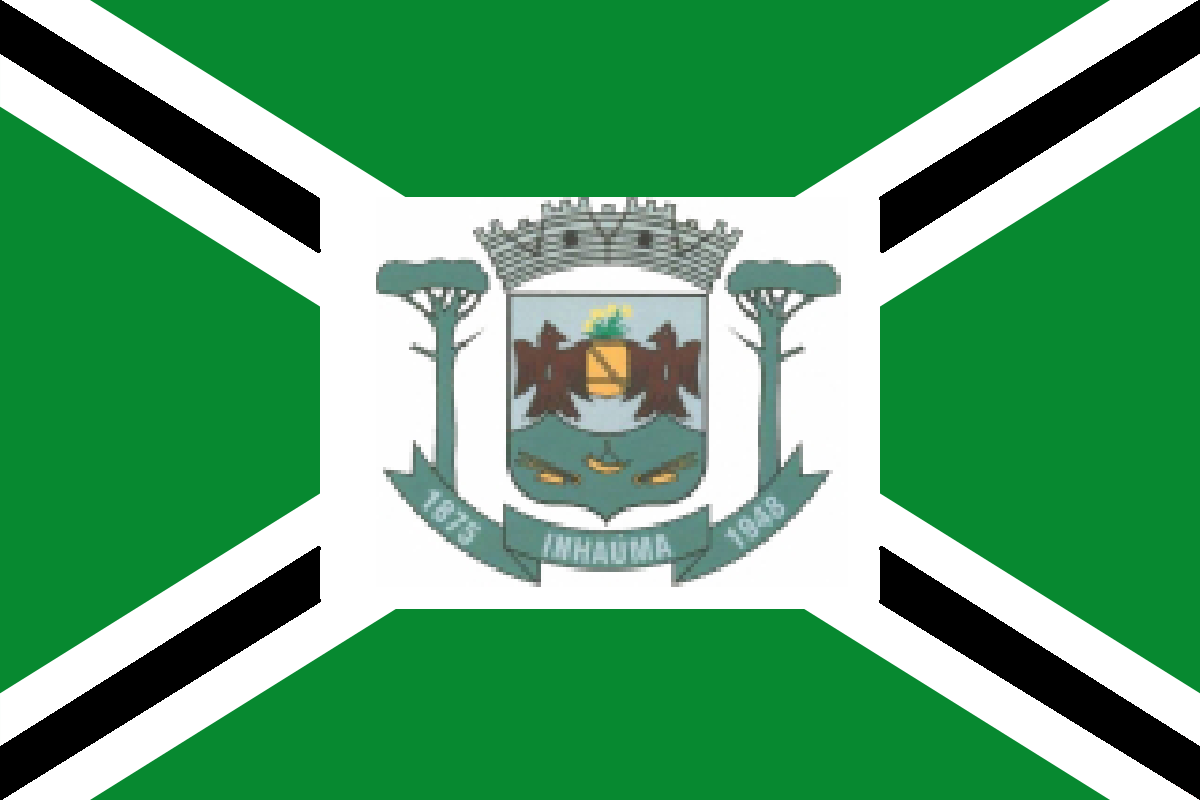
- Flag
- Interactive map of Inhaúma
- Country: Brazil
- Region: Southeast
- State: Minas Gerais
- Mesoregion: Metropolitana de Belo Horizonte

Population (2022 Census)
  - Total: 6,239
  - Estimate (2025): 6,465
- Time zone: UTC−3 (BRT)

Inhaúma is a municipality in the state of Minas Gerais in the Southeast region of Brazil.

== See also ==
- List of municipalities in Minas Gerais
