= Caetanópolis =

Human settlement in Brazil

Coordinates: 19°17′42″S 44°25′08″W

- Municipality
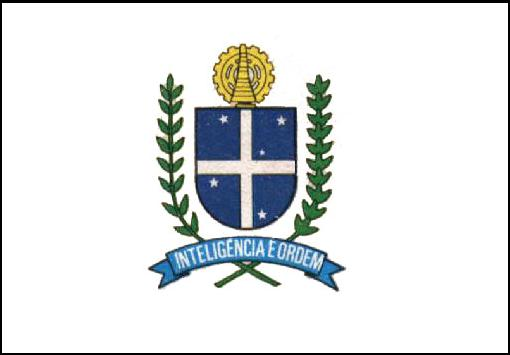
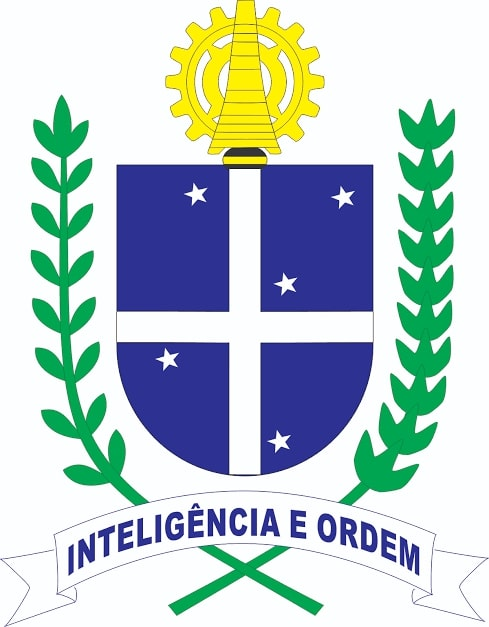
- Flag Coat of arms
- Interactive map of Caetanópolis
- Country: Brazil
- State: Minas Gerais
- Region: Southeast

Population (2022 Census)
  - Total: 11,435
  - Estimate (2025): 11,906
- Time zone: UTC−3 (BRT)

Location of Caetanópolis on a map of the state of Minas Gerais

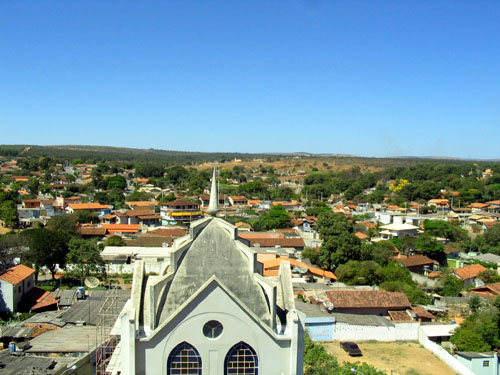
Church tower view

Caetanópolis is a Brazilian municipality located in the northeast of the state of Minas Gerais. Its population as of 2025 was 11,906 people living in a total area of 156 km^{2} (60 sq mi). The city belongs to the meso-region of Metropolitana de Belo Horizonte and to the micro-region of Sete Lagoas. It became a municipality in 1954.

== Toponym ==
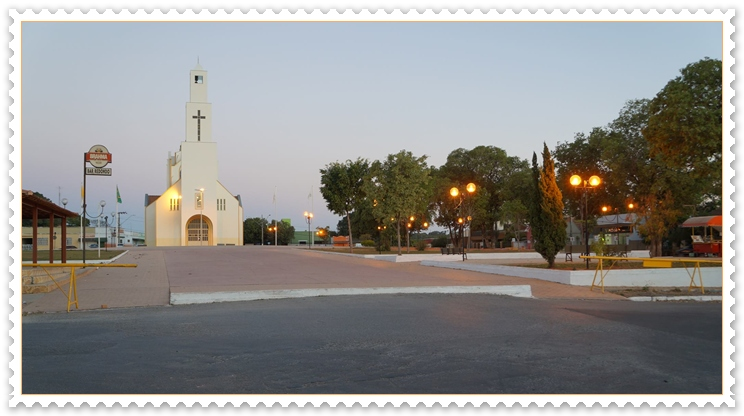
Antonino Pinto Macarenhas Square

The name was chosen in 1953 to pay homage to Caetano Mascarenhas, who had built the first textile factory in the region. The motto of the town on their welcoming sign is "Caetanópolis, o berço da industria téxtil no Brasil".

== Geography ==
The city center of Caetanópolis is located at an elevation of 742 meters just east of BR-040 and north of Sete Lagoas. Neighboring municipalities are: Paraopeba and Sete Lagoas.

Distances

- Belo Horizonte: 105 km south on BR-040
- Paraopeba: 5 km
- Sete Lagoas: 31 km south on BR-040
- Cordisburgo: 29 km northeast on MG-231

== Economy ==
Services, mining, agriculture, and small industries are the main economic activities. There is a textile factory, Companhia de Fiação e Tecelagem Cedro e Cachoeira, and slate mining. The GDP in 2005 was approximately R$72 million, with 6 million reais from taxes, 34 million reais from services, 28 million reais from industry, and 3 million reais from agriculture. There were 66 rural producers on 14,000 hectares of land (2006). Approximately 250 persons were occupied in agriculture. The main crops are citrus fruits, sugarcane, rice, beans, and corn. There were 5,000 head of cattle, of which 1,500 were milk cows (2006). Only 18 of the rural properties had tractors in 2006.

Of the working force there were 790 workers in 53 small industries, 420 workers in 153 retail units, 146 workers in 32 restaurants and hotels, and 46 workers in education (2006).

There was 1 bank (2007). In the vehicle fleet there were 1,108 automobiles, 93 trucks, 119 pickup trucks, 30 buses, and 359 motorcycles (2007).

== Health and education ==
In the health sector there were 9 health establishments, which included 6 public health clinics, and 2 private clinics (2005). There was 1 private hospital with 50 beds. Educational needs of 2,270 students were met by 7 primary schools, 2 middle schools, and 4 pre-primary schools.

- Municipal Human Development Index: 0.770 (2000)
- State ranking: 168 out of 853 municipalities as of 2000
- National ranking: 1,336 out of 5,138 municipalities as of 2000
- Literacy rate: 92%
- Life expectancy: 70 (average of males and females)

In 2000 the per capita monthly income of R$229.00 was below the state average of R$276.00 and below the national average of R$297.00. Poços de Caldas had the highest per capita monthly income in 2000 with R$435.00. The lowest was Setubinha with R$73.00.

The highest ranking municipality in Minas Gerais in 2000 was Poços de Caldas with 0.841, while the lowest was Setubinha with 0.568. Nationally the highest was São Caetano do Sul in São Paulo with 0.919, while the lowest was Setubinha. In more recent statistics (considering 5,507 municipalities) Manari in the state of Pernambuco has the lowest rating in the country—0,467—putting it in last place.

== See also ==
- List of municipalities in Minas Gerais
