= Baldim =

- City
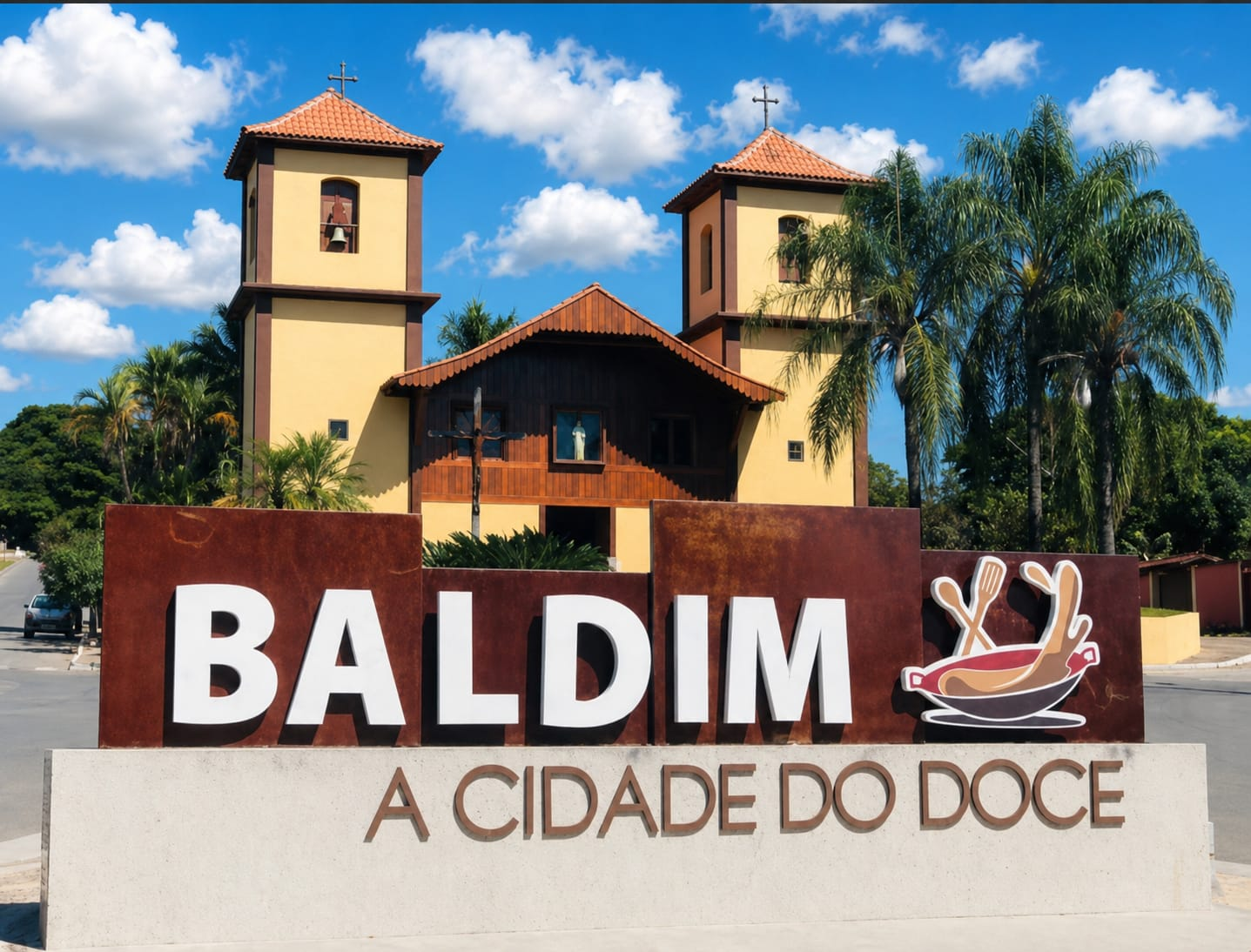
- Baldim main square

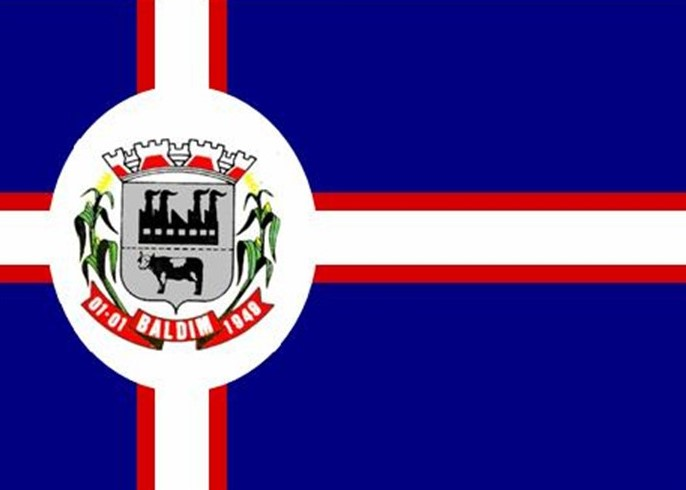
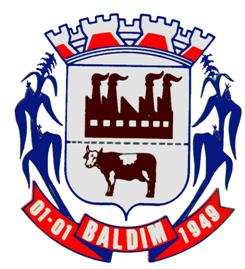
- Flag Coat of arms

- Location in Brazil
- Coordinates: 19°17′16″S 43°57′25″W
- Country: Brazil
- Region: Southeast
- State: Minas Gerais
- Mesoregion: Metropolitan of Belo Horizonte
- Microregion: Sete Lagoas
- Incorporated: 1 January 1949

Government
  - Mayor: Joao Antonio da Trindade

Area
  - Total: 554,029 km^{2} (213,912 sq mi)
- Elevation: 655 m (2,149 ft)

Population (2022 Census)
  - Total: 7,492
  - Estimate (2025): 7,595
- Time zone: UTC−3 (BRT)
- HDI (2010): 0.671
- Website: Official Website

Baldim is a Brazilian municipality located in the state of Minas Gerais. Its population as of 2025 is estimated to be 7,595, in a total area of 556,266 km^{2} (214,776 sq mi). The city belongs to the mesoregion Metropolitana de Belo Horizonte and to the microregion of Sete Lagoas.

== See also ==
- List of municipalities in Minas Gerais
