= Confins =

- City
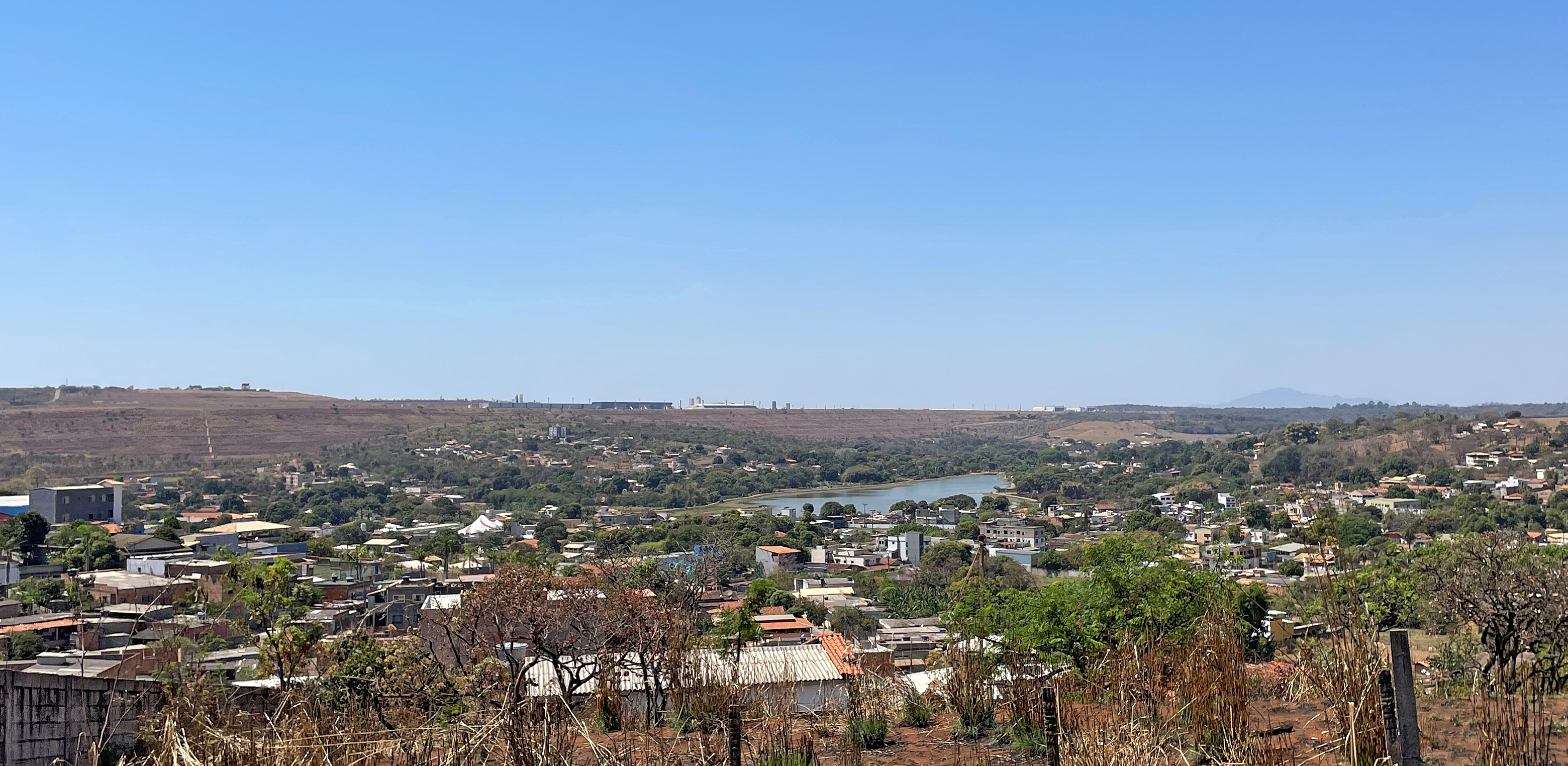
- Partial view of Confins

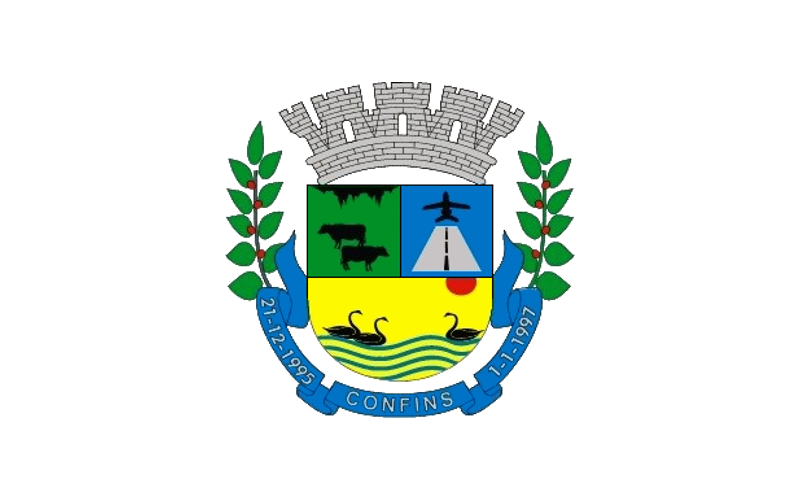
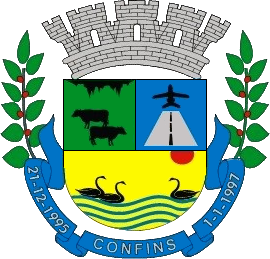
- Flag Coat of arms

- Location in Minas Gerais

- Location in Brazil
- Coordinates: 19°37′45″S 43°59′30″W
- Country: Brazil
- Region: Southeast
- State: Minas Gerais
- Mesoregion: Metropolitan of Belo Horizonte
- Microregion: Belo Horizonte
- Incorporated: December 21, 1995

Government
  - Mayor: Geraldo Gonçalves dos Santos

Area
  - Total: 16,219 sq mi (42,008 km^{2})

Population (2022 Census)
  - Total: 7,350
  - Estimate (2025): 7,758
- Time zone: UTC−3 (BRT)
- Area code: 31
- HDI (2010): 0.747
- Website: Official Website

Confins is a Brazilian municipality located in the state of Minas Gerais. Its population as of 2025 is estimated to be 7,758 people. The area of the municipality is 42.008 km^{2} (16.219 sq mi). The city belongs to the mesoregion Metropolitana de Belo Horizonte and to the microregion of Belo Horizonte. It is home of the international airport of Belo Horizonte, Tancredo Neves International Airport.

== See also ==
- List of municipalities in Minas Gerais
