= Santana de Pirapama =

- municipality
- Nickname: Pirapama
- Location in Minas Gerais

- Location within Brazil
- Coordinates: 19°00′21″S 44°02′34″W
- Country: Brazil
- Region: Southeast
- State: Minas Gerais
- Founded: 1948

Government
  - Mayor: Alberto Carlos Gomes Tameirão (PMDB)

Area
  - Total: 1,220.98 km^{2} (471.424 sq mi)

Population (2022 Census)
  - Total: 7,030
- Demonym: Pirapanense (Portuguese)
- Time zone: UTC−3 (BRT)

Santana de Pirapama is a municipality in the state of Minas Gerais, Brazil. In 2022 Census, its population stood at 7,030 people.

== History ==
Santana de Pirapama's history begun with the foundation of the district of Traíras - the name of a fish, common in that region. In 1948, Pirapama was risen to the status of municipality, independent of the town of Codisburgo.

Tradução - A história de Santana de Pirapama começou com a fundação do distrito de Traíras - o nome de um peixe, comum naquela região. Em 1948, Pirapama foi ressuscitado ao status de município, independente da cidade de Codisburgo.

== The name ==
Santana de Pirapama came from a union of Portuguese and Indian languages. "Santana" is a contraction of "Santa Ana", Portuguese expression referring to Saint Anne, Patron of the city. "Pirapama" came from the language of the natives, and means "furious fish", it's a characteristic of traíra, the fish whose name was used as the name of Pirapama when it was just a district of Codisburgo.

Tradução - Santana de Pirapama veio de uma união de línguas portuguesa e Indiana. "Santana" é uma contração de "Santa Ana", expressão Português referindo-se a Santa Ana, Padroeira da cidade. "Pirapama" veio da língua dos nativos, e significa "peixe furioso", é uma característica de traíra, o peixe cujo nome foi usado como o nome de Pirapama quando era apenas um distrito de Codisburgo.

== Culture ==
In the month of July, people in Santana de Pirapama make a party to their Patron, Saint Anne. Besides Saint Anne, other saints are claimed in this party. named "Jubileu", in Portuguese, like Our Lady of the Rosary and Saint Sebastian.

Tradução - No mês de julho, as pessoas em Santana de Pirapama fazer uma festa para o seu Patrono, São Anne. Além de Santa Ana, outros santos são reivindicados nesta festa. chamado "Jubileu", em Português, como Nossa Senhora do Rosário e São Sebastião.
