= Metropolitana de Belo Horizonte (mesoregion) =

- Mesoregion
- Location within Minas Gerais
- Coordinates: 19°49′01″S 43°57′21″W
- Country: Brazil
- Region: Southeast
- State: Minas Gerais

Area
  - Total: 39,486.678 km^{2} (15,245.892 sq mi)

Population (2010/IBGE)
  - Total: 6,302,665
  - Density: 159.6/km^{2} (413/sq mi)
- Time zone: UTC-3 (BRT)
  - Summer (DST): UTC-2 (BRST)
- CEP postal code: 30000-000
- Area code: +55 31

The mesoregion Metropolitana de Belo Horizonte is one of the twelve mesoregions of the Brazilian state of Minas Gerais. It is composed of 105 municipalities, distributed across 8 microregions. It is the most populous and densely populated of all the mesoregions of Minas Gerais. The largest city by population is Belo Horizonte.

The mesoregion encompasses all the Belo Horizonte metropolitan region (which has only 34 cities), and both should not be confused. The former is a geographical division created by the Brazilian Institute of Geography and Statistics for statistical purposes, while the latter is the definition of a metropolitan area.
