= Cachoeira da Prata =

Coordinates: 19.525°S 44.4539°W

- Municipality
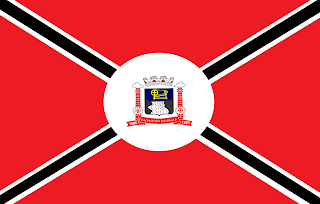
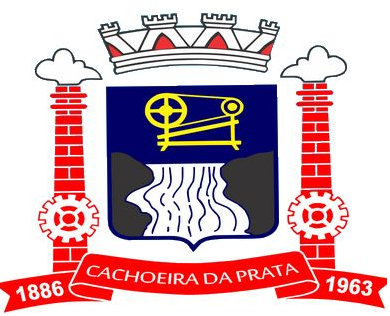
- Flag Coat of arms
- Interactive map of Cachoeira da Prata
- Country: Brazil
- Region: Southeast
- State: Minas Gerais
- Mesoregion: Metropolitana de Belo Horizonte

Population (2022 Census)
  - Total: 3,693
  - Estimate (2025): 3,785
- Time zone: UTC−3 (BRT)

Cachoeira da Prata is a municipality in the state of Minas Gerais in the Southeast region of Brazil.

== See also ==
- List of municipalities in Minas Gerais
