= Jaboticatubas =

- Municipality
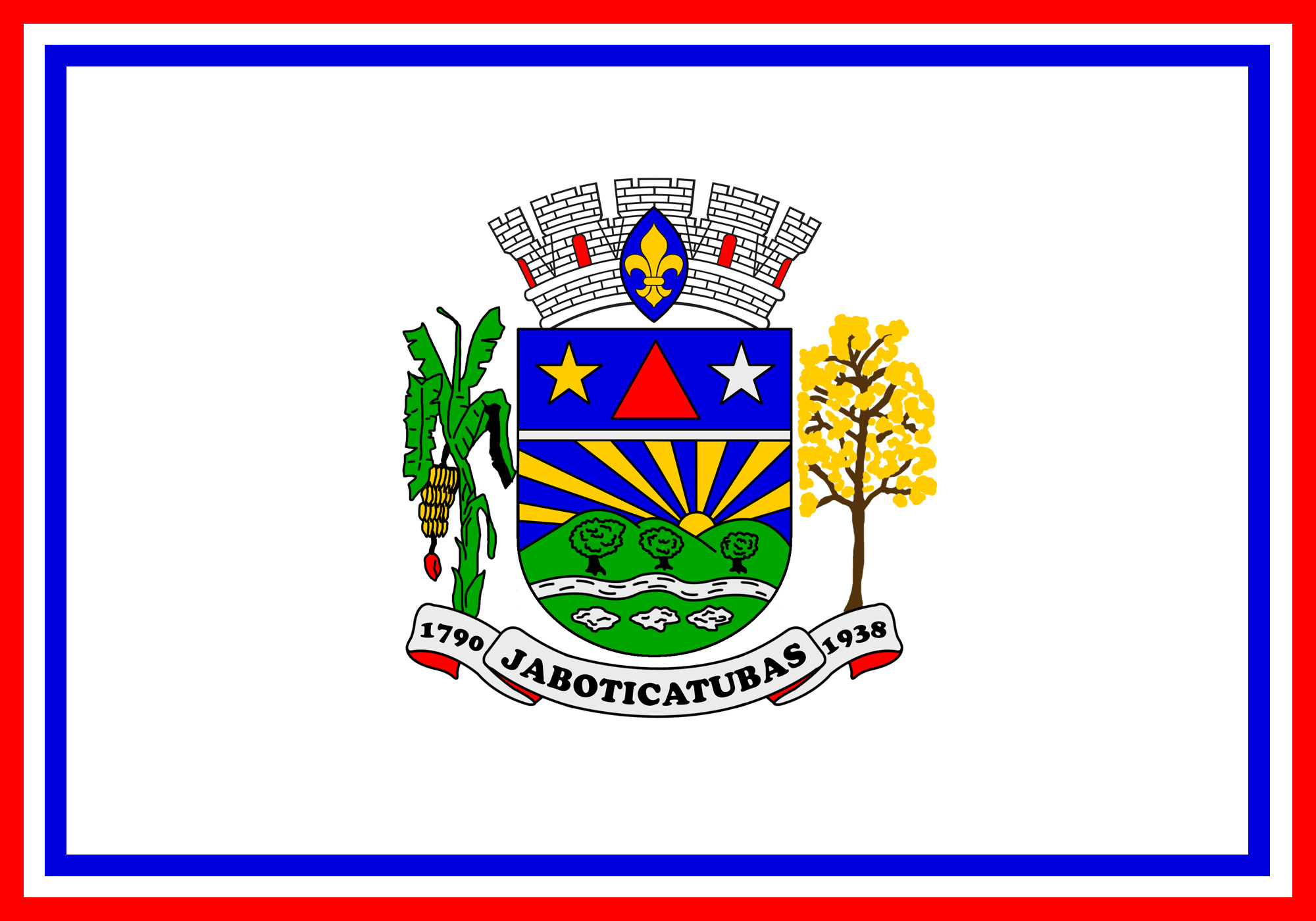
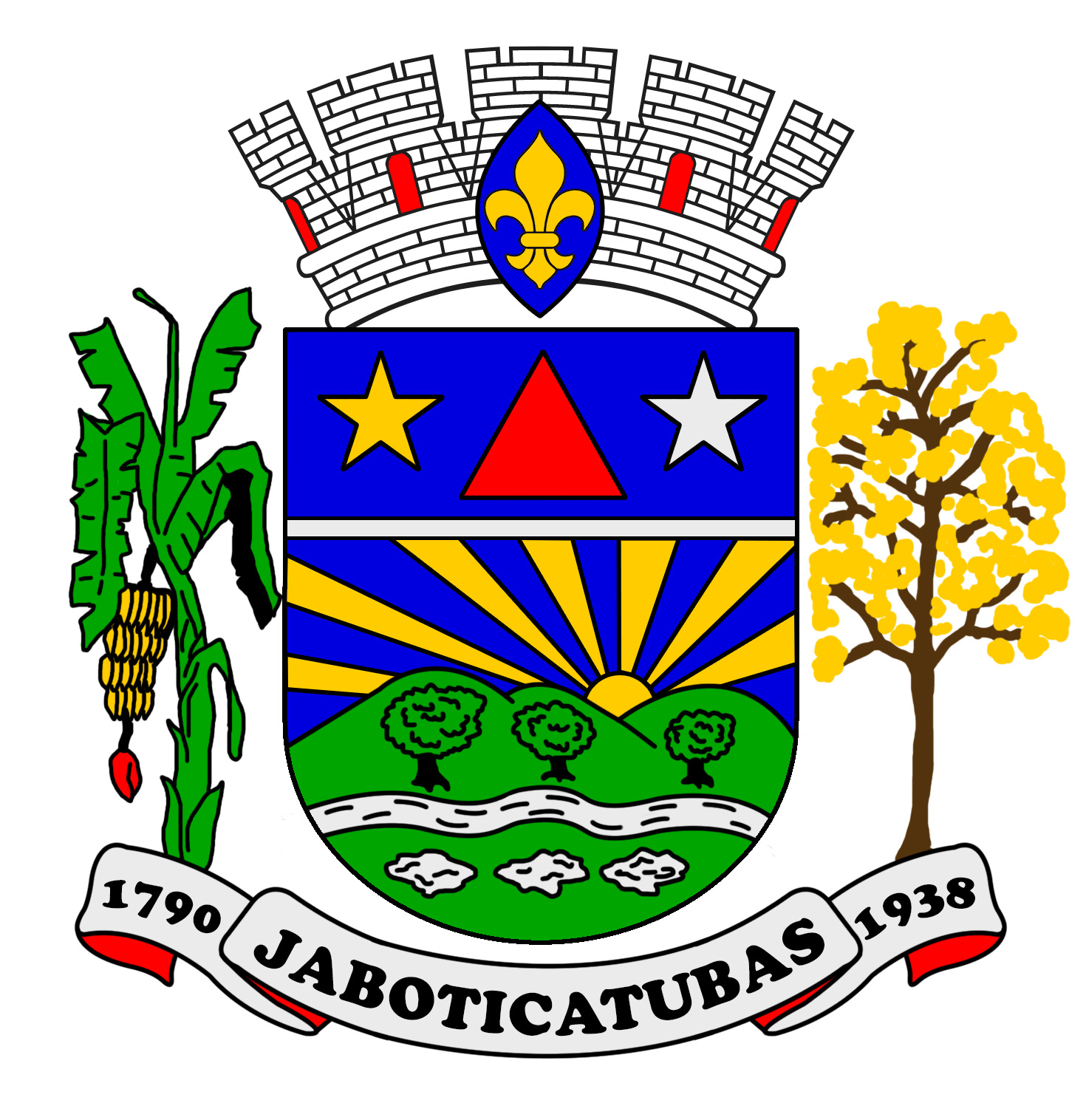
- Flag Coat of arms

- Location in Brazil
- Coordinates: 19°30′50″S 43°44′42″W
- Country: Brazil
- Region: Southeast
- State: Minas Gerais
- Mesoregion: Metropolitana de Belo Horizonte

Population (2022 Census)
  - Total: 20,406
  - Estimate (2025): 21,407
- Time zone: UTC−3 (BRT)

Jaboticatubas is a municipality in the state of Minas Gerais in the Southeast region of Brazil.

== See also ==
- List of municipalities in Minas Gerais
