= Fortuna de Minas =

Coordinates: 19.5608°S 44.4469°W

- Municipality
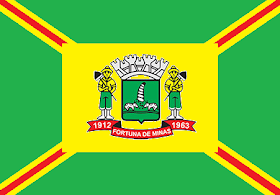
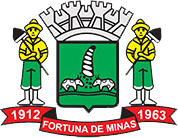
- Flag Coat of arms
- Interactive map of Fortuna de Minas
- Country: Brazil
- Region: Southeast
- State: Minas Gerais
- Mesoregion: Metropolitana de Belo Horizonte

Population (2022 Census)
  - Total: 3,093
  - Estimate (2025): 3,230
- Time zone: UTC−3 (BRT)

Fortuna de Minas is a municipality in the state of Minas Gerais in the Southeast region of Brazil.

== See also ==
- List of municipalities in Minas Gerais
