= Inhaúma, Rio de Janeiro =

Inhaúma
- Neighborhood
- Location in Rio de Janeiro Inhaúma (Brazil)
- Coordinates: 22°52′07″S 43°16′53″W
- Country: Brazil
- State: Rio de Janeiro (RJ)
- Municipality/City: Rio de Janeiro
- Zone: North Zone

Inhaúma is a neighborhood in the North Zone of Rio de Janeiro, Brazil.
