= Capim Branco =

- Municipality
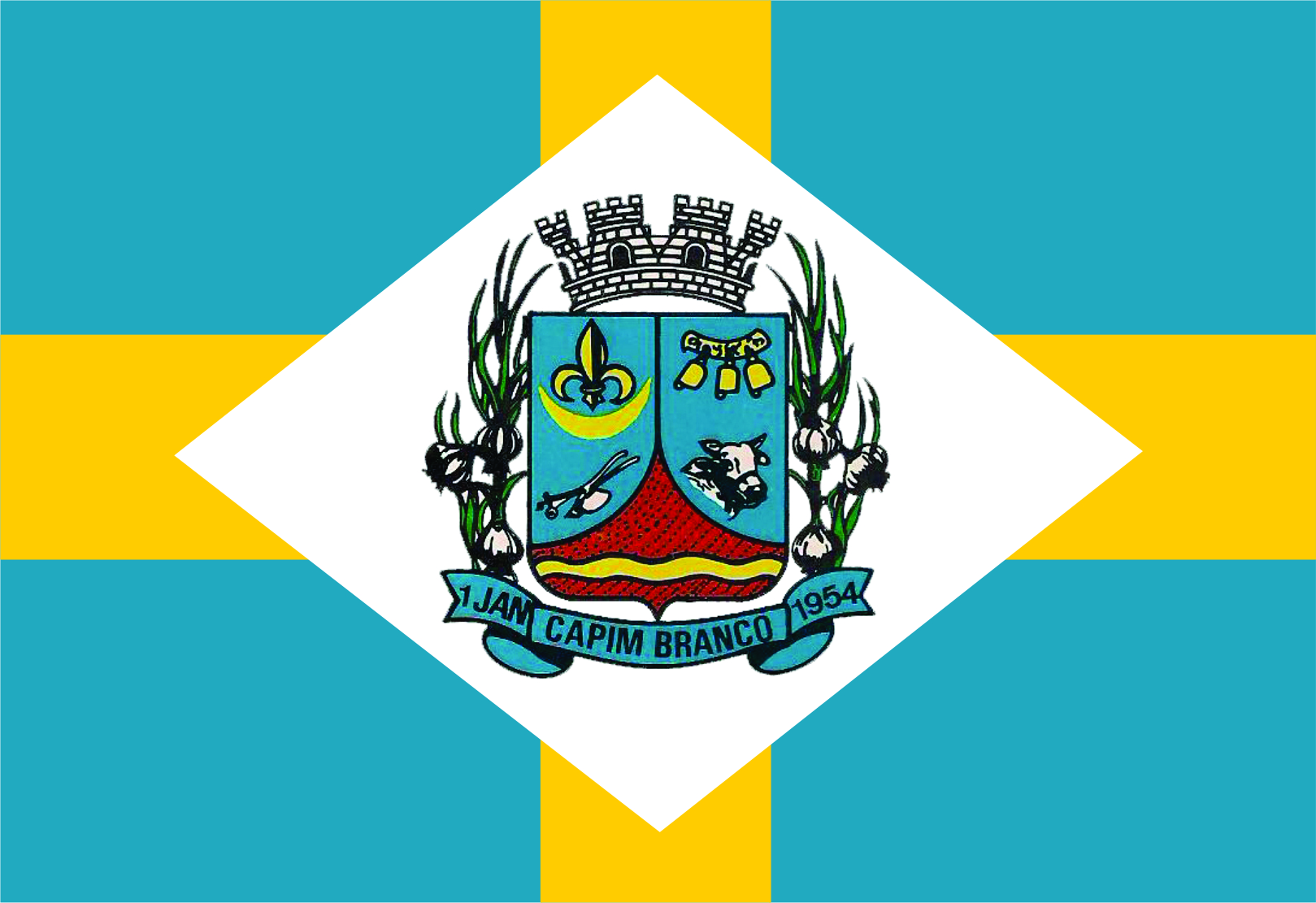
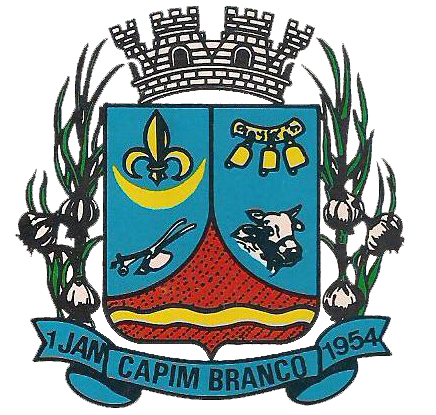
- Flag Coat of arms

- Location in Brazil
- Coordinates: 19°32′56″S 44°07′01″W
- Country: Brazil
- Region: Southeast
- State: Minas Gerais
- Mesoregion: Metropolitana de Belo Horizonte

Population (2022 Census)
  - Total: 10,663
  - Estimate (2025): 11,210
- Time zone: UTC−3 (BRT)
- Website: Official Website

Capim Branco is a municipality in the state of Minas Gerais in the Southeast region of Brazil.

== See also ==
- List of municipalities in Minas Gerais
