= Papagaios =

Municipality in Minas Gerais, Brazil

- Municipality
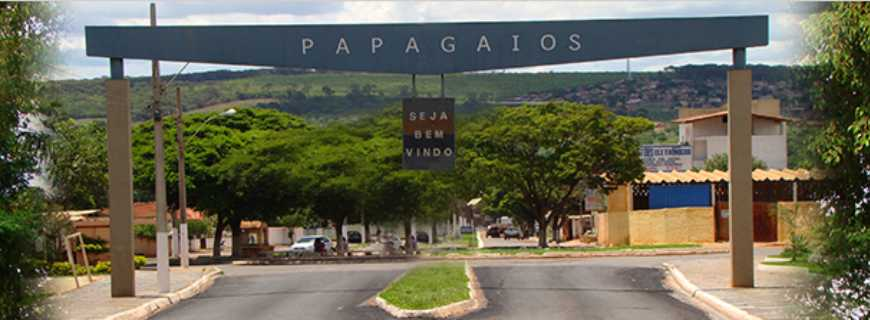
- Entry of Papagaios

- Location in Brazil
- Coordinates: 19°26′56″S 44°44′52″W
- Country: Brazil
- Region: Southeast
- State: Minas Gerais

Area
  - Total: 554 km^{2} (214 sq mi)

Population (2022 Census)
  - Total: 13,920
  - Estimate (2025): 14,202
  - Density: 25.1/km^{2} (65.1/sq mi)
- Time zone: UTC−3 (BRT)

Papagaios is a municipality in Minas Gerais, Brazil. Its population was 14,202 in 2025 and its area is 554 square kilometres (214 square miles). Its economy is based on exports of slate.

Papagaios is 150 kilometres (93 miles) away from the state capital, Belo Horizonte.
