= Jequitibá =

Coordinates: 19°14′09″S 44°01′40″W

- Municipality
- Interactive map of Jequitibá
- Country: Brazil
- Region: Southeast
- State: Minas Gerais
- Mesoregion: Metropolitana de Belo Horizonte

Population (2022 Census)
  - Total: 5,883
  - Estimate (2025): 6,142
- Time zone: UTC−3 (BRT)

Jequitibá is a municipality in the state of Minas Gerais in the Southeast region of Brazil.

== See also ==
- List of municipalities in Minas Gerais
