= Prudente de Morais, Minas Gerais =

Coordinates: 19°28′55″S 44°09′18″W

- Municipality
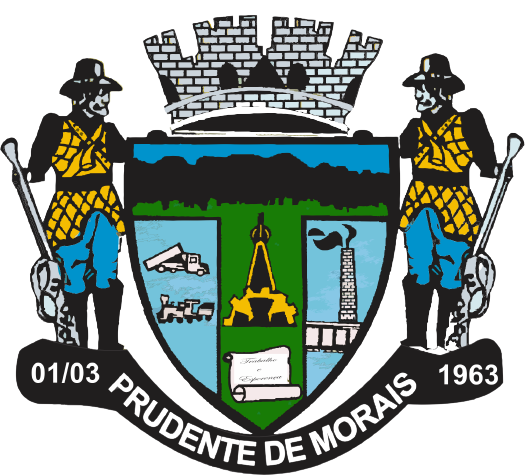
- Coat of arms
- Interactive map of Prudente de Morais, Minas Gerais
- Country: Brazil
- Region: Southeast
- State: Minas Gerais
- Mesoregion: Metropolitana de Belo Horizonte

Population (2022 Census)
  - Total: 11,466
  - Estimate (2025): 12,052
- Time zone: UTC−3 (BRT)

Prudente de Morais, Minas Gerais is a municipality in the state of Minas Gerais in the Southeast region of Brazil.

== See also ==
- List of municipalities in Minas Gerais
