= Funilândia =

Coordinates: 19°21′S 44°03′W

- Municipality
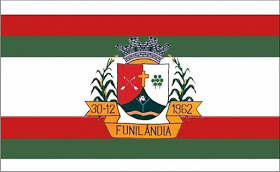
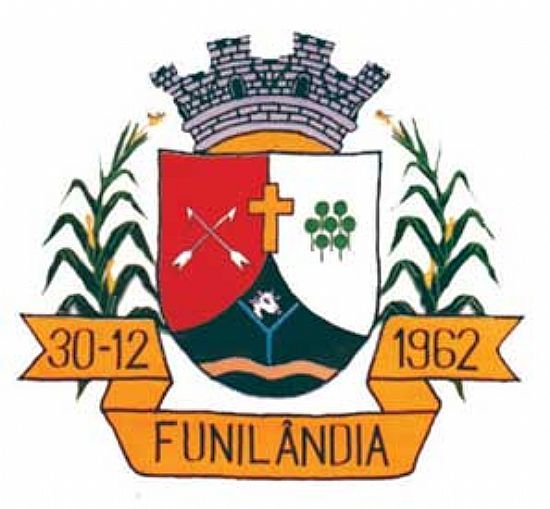
- Flag Coat of arms
- Interactive map of Funilândia
- Country: Brazil
- Region: Southeast
- State: Minas Gerais
- Mesoregion: Metropolitana de Belo Horizonte

Population (2022 Census)
  - Total: 4,686
  - Estimate (2025): 4,934
- Time zone: UTC−3 (BRT)

Funilândia is a municipality in the state of Minas Gerais in the Southeast region of Brazil.

== See also ==
- List of municipalities in Minas Gerais
