= Cordisburgo =

- Municipality
- Municipality of Cordisburgo
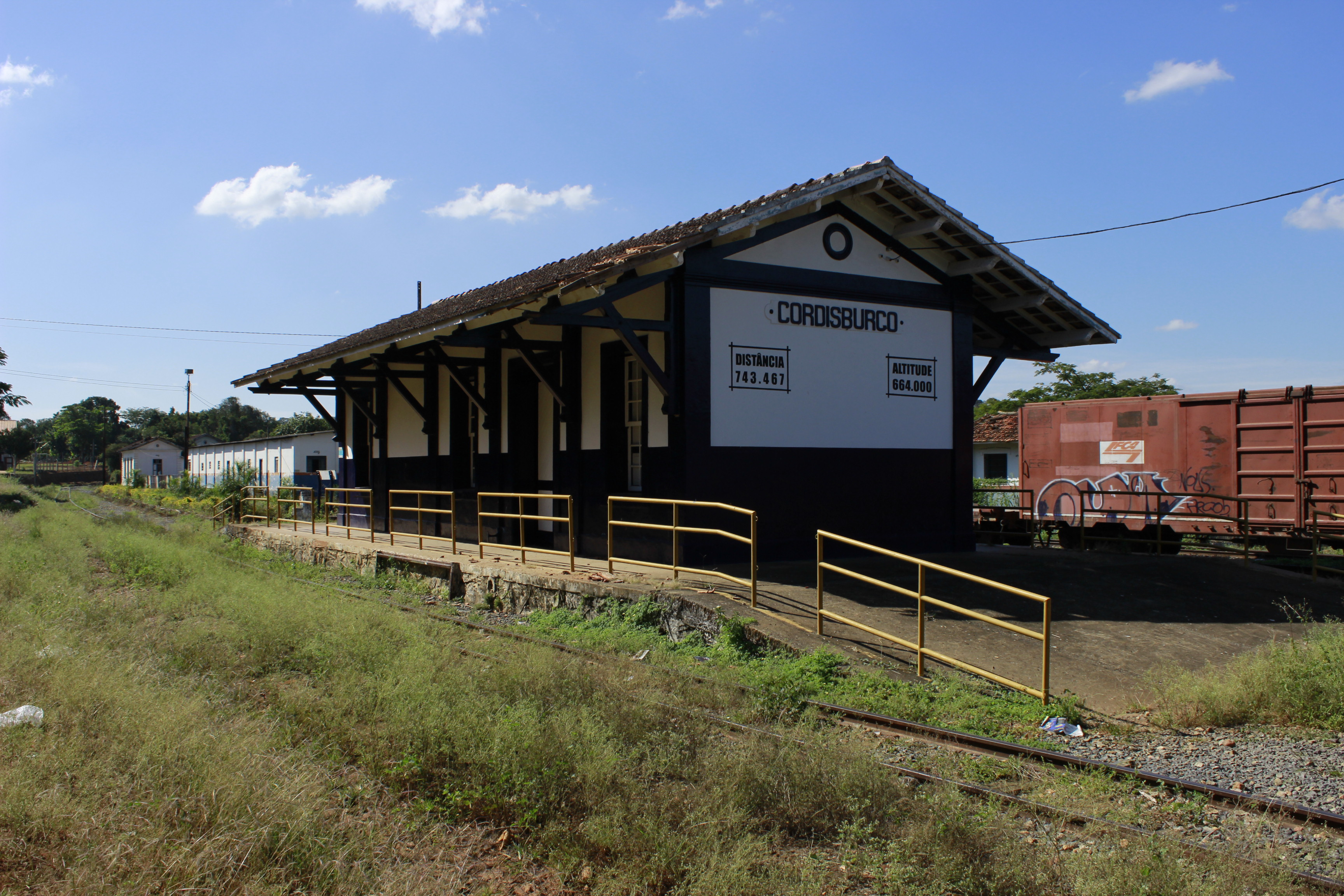

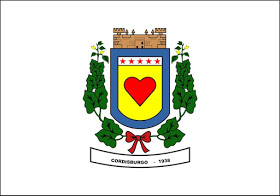
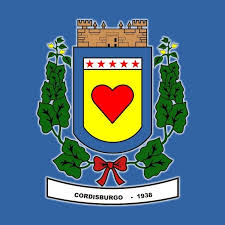
- Flag Coat of arms

- Location in Minas Gerais

- Location in Brazil
- Coordinates: 19°7′30″S 44°19′15″W
- Country: Brazil
- State: Minas Gerais
- Mesoregion: Metropolitana de Belo Horizonte
- Microregion: Sete Lagoas

Government
  - Mayor: José Maurício Gomes

Population (2022 Census)
  - Total: 7,547
  - Estimate (2025): 7,535
- Demonym: Cordisburguense
- Time zone: UTC−3 (BRT)
- HDI (2010): 0.656 – medium

Cordisburgo is a municipality in the state of Minas Gerais in the Southeast region of Brazil.

It is the birthplace of the writer João Guimarães Rosa.

== See also ==
- List of municipalities in Minas Gerais
