= Matozinhos =

- Municipality
- Municipality of Matozinhos
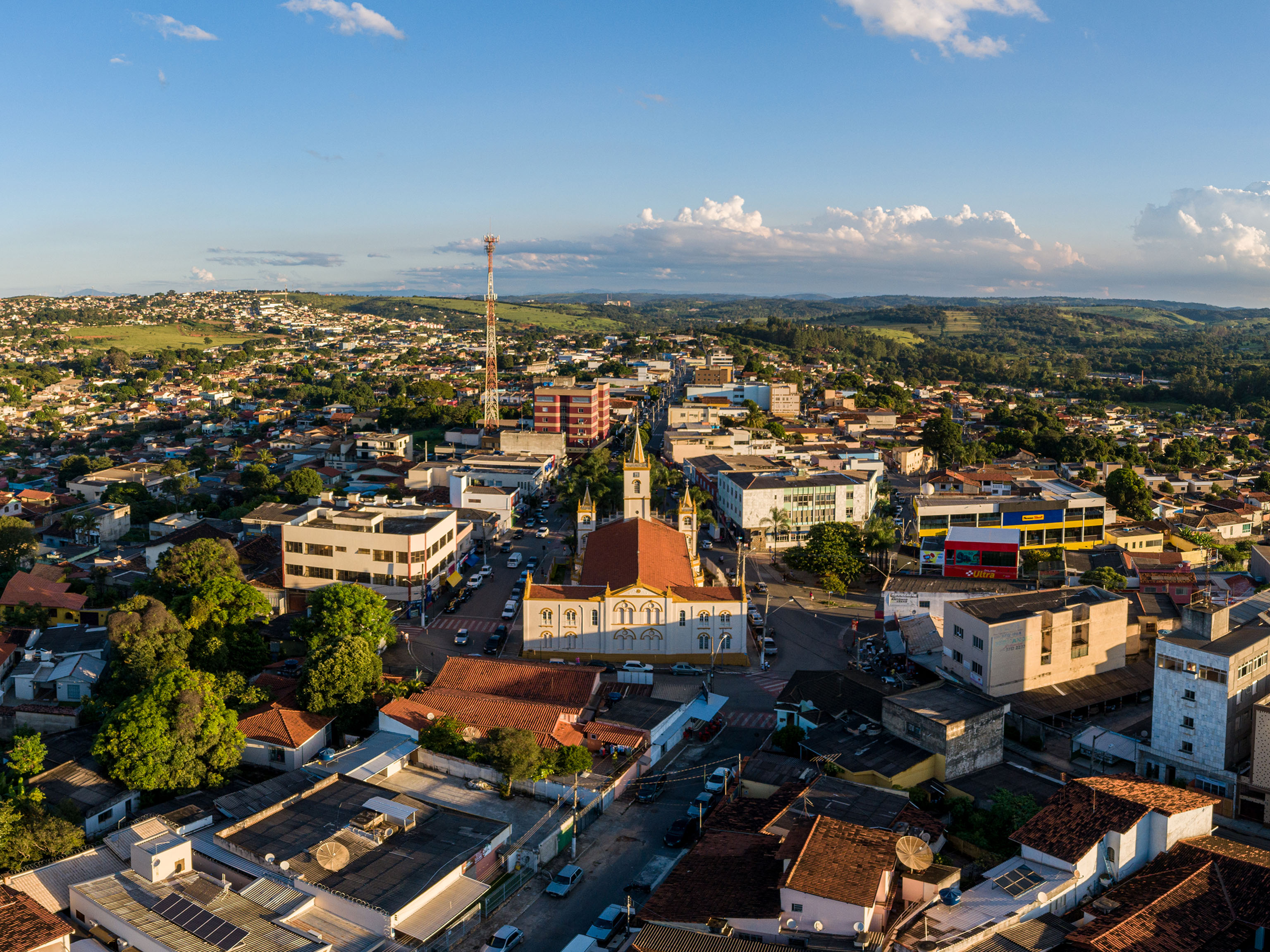

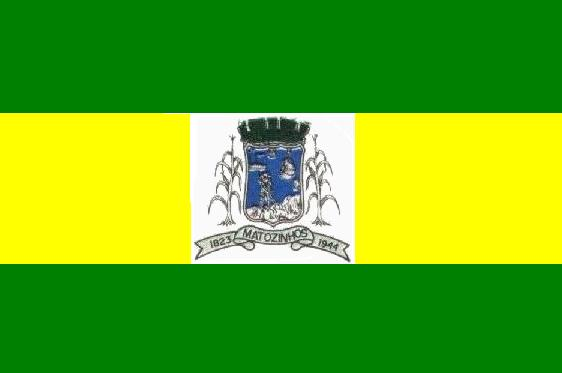
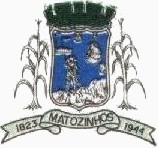
- Flag Coat of arms

- Location in Minas Gerais

- Location in Brazil
- Coordinates: 19°33′28″S 44°4′51″W
- Country: Brazil
- Region: Southeast
- State: Minas Gerais
- Mesoregion: Metropolitana de Belo Horizonte

Population (2022 Census)
  - Total: 37,618
  - Estimate (2025): 39,529
- Time zone: UTC−3 (BRT)
- HDI (2010): 0.731 – high

Matozinhos is a municipality in the state of Minas Gerais in the Southeast region of Brazil.

== History ==
Matozinhos was founded in 1823 and became municipality on 1 January 1944.

== Geography ==
=== Climate ===
Matozinhos is classified as humid subtropical climate (Köppen climate classification: Cwa).

== See also ==
- List of municipalities in Minas Gerais
