= Serra do Cipó National Park =

National park in Minas Gerais, Brazil

- Parque Nacional da Serra do Cipó
- IUCN category II (national park)
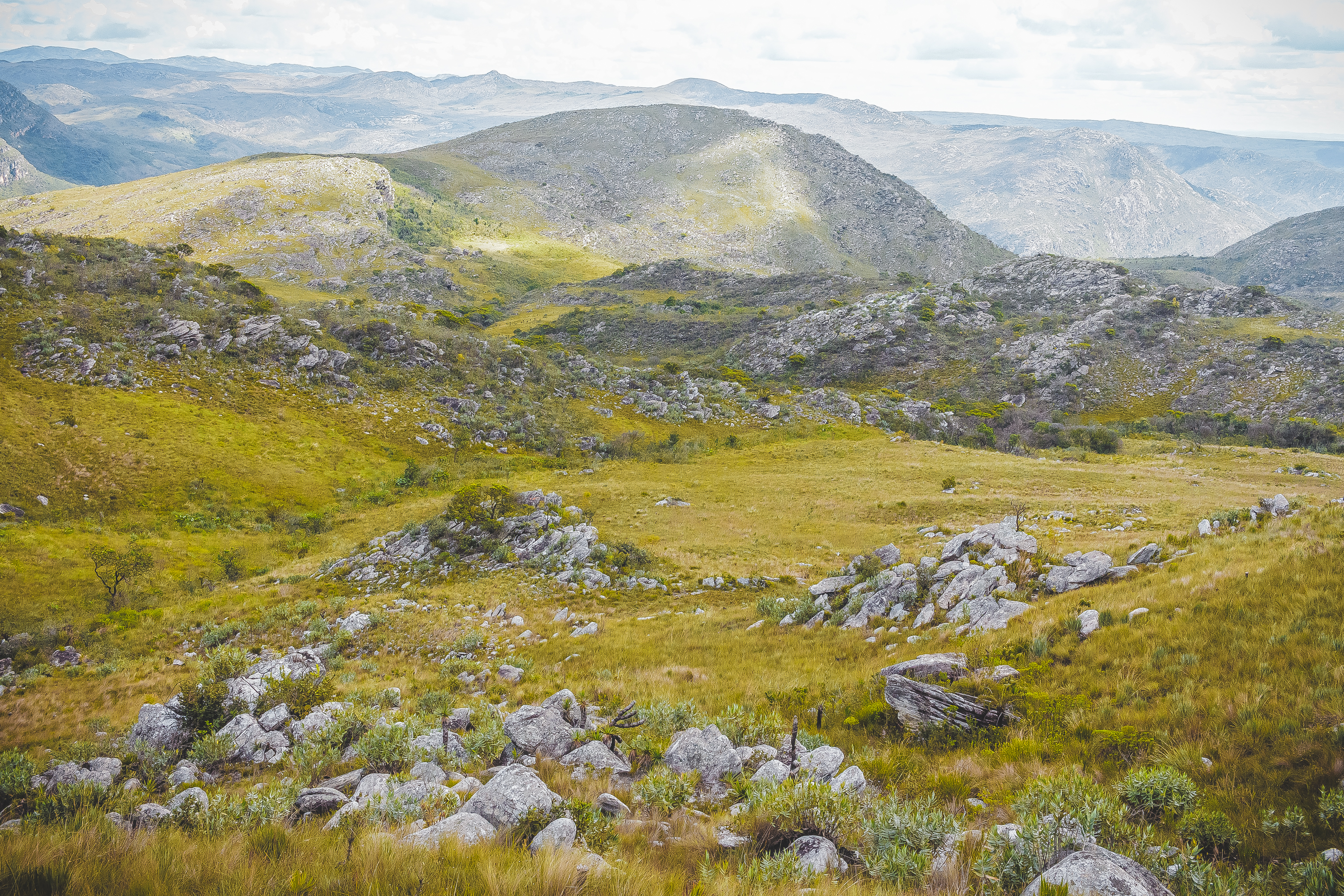

- Location within Brazil
- Nearest city: Itabira, Minas Gerais
- Coordinates: 19°21′54″S 43°31′59″W
- Designation: National park
- Administrator: ICMBio

The Serra do Cipó National Park (Portuguese: Parque Nacional da Serra do Cipó) is a national park in the state of Minas Gerais, Brazil.

== Location ==
The park is in the Cerrado biome. It covers 31,639 hectares (78,180 acres). It was created by decree 90.223 of 25 September 1984, modified by decree 94.984 of 30 September 1987. It is administered by the Chico Mendes Institute for Biodiversity Conservation. It lies in the municipalities of Itabira, Itambé do Mato Dentro, Jaboticatubas, Nova União, Morro do Pilar and Santana do Riacho, Minas Gerais.

== Conservation ==
The park is classified as IUCN protected area category II (national park). It has the objectives of preserving natural ecosystems of great ecological relevance and scenic beauty, enabling scientific research, environmental education, outdoors recreation and eco-tourism. Protected species include the maned wolf (Chrysocyon brachyurus), ocelot (Leopardus pardalis), cougar (Puma concolor), white-necked hawk (Buteogallus lacernulatus), the extremely local Cipo canastero (Asthenes luizae), the lizards Placosoma cipoense and Rhachisaurus brachylepis, the fish Characidium lagosantense and the butterfly Nirodia belphegor.

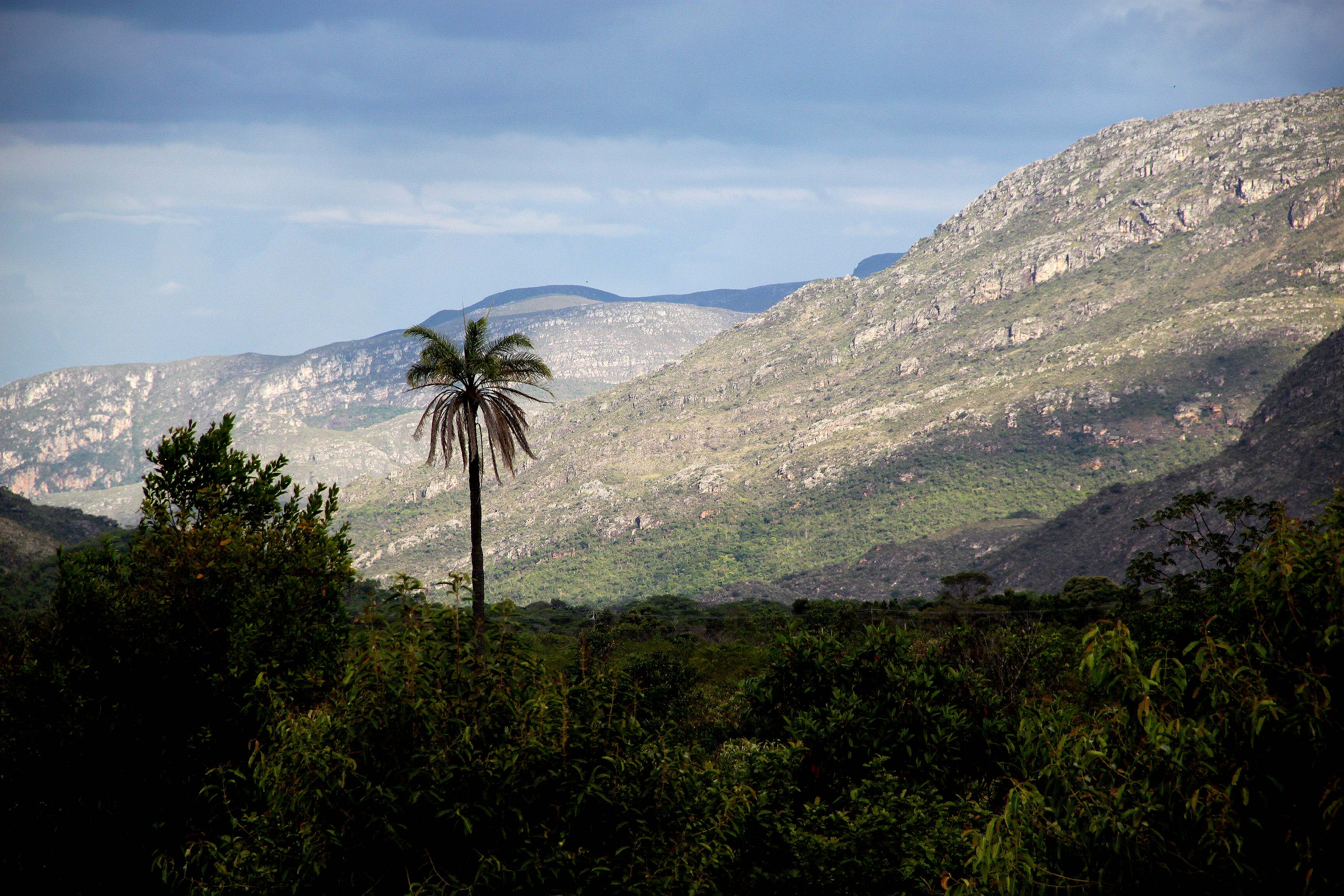
Sunset

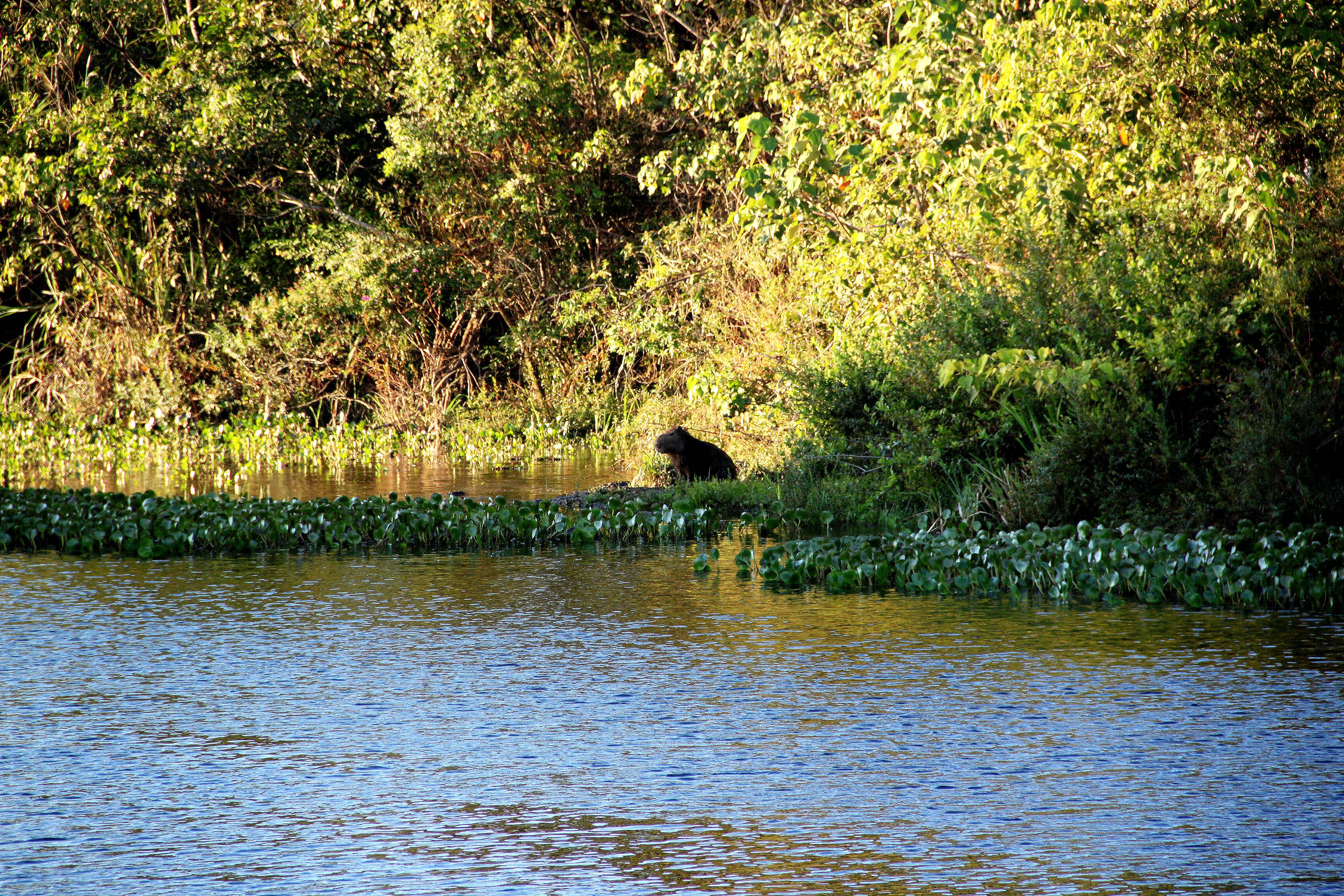

== Sources ==
- Parque Nacional da Serra do Cipó (in Portuguese), Chico Mendes Institute for Biodiversity Conservation
- Unidade de Conservação: Parque Nacional da Serra do Cipó (in Portuguese), MMA: Ministério do Meio Ambiente
