= Morro da Pedreira Environmental Protection Area =

Protected area of Brazil

- IUCN category V (protected landscape/seascape)
- Location within Brazil
- Nearest city: Belo Horizonte, Minas Gerais
- Coordinates: 19°20′S 43°32′W
- Area: 131,769 hectares (325,610 acres)
- Designation: Environmental Protection Area
- Created: 26 January 1990

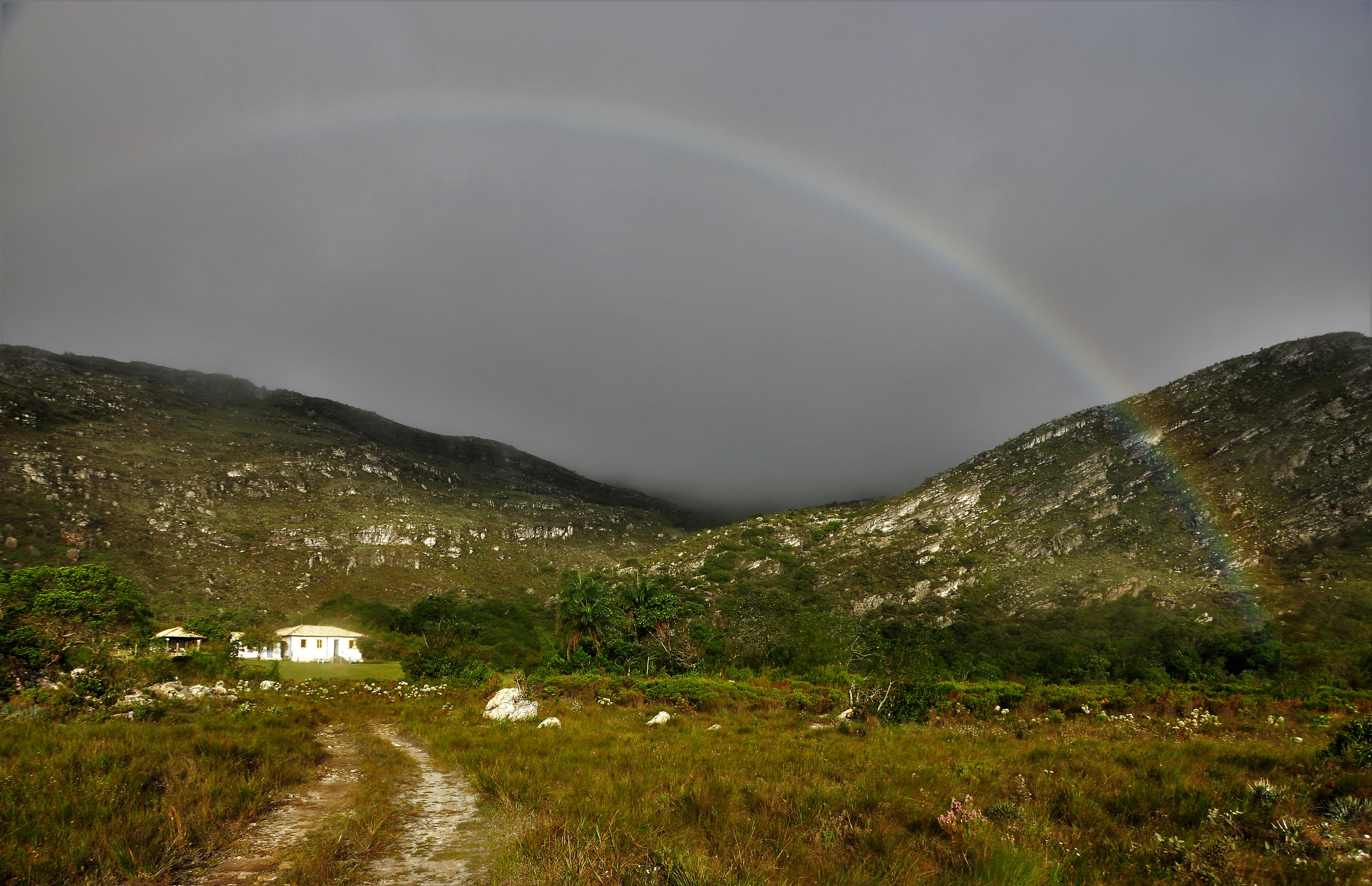

Morro da Pedreira Environmental Protection Area is a protected area within the Cerrado biome, in Minas Gerais, Brazil.

== Location ==
The protected area in the Cerrado biome, which covers 131,769 hectares (325,610 acres), was created on January 26, 1990. It is administered by the Chico Mendes Institute for Biodiversity Conservation. It contains all or part of the municipalities of Conceição do Mato Dentro, Itabira, Itambé do Mato Dentro, Jaboticatubas, Nova União, Morro do Pilar, Santana do Riacho and Taquaraçu de Minas in the state of Minas Gerais.

== Conservation ==
The environmental protection area is classed as IUCN protected area category V, protected landscape/seascape. The purpose is to preserve biological diversity, control the impact of human occupation and ensure sustainable use of natural resources. Protected species in the area include maned wolf (Chrysocyon brachyurus) and ocelot (Leopardus pardalis mitis).

== Sources ==
- Àrea de Proteção Ambiental do Morro da Pedreira (in Portuguese), Chico Mendes Institute for Biodiversity Conservation
- Unidade de Conservação: Morro da Pedreira Environmental Protection Area (in Portuguese), MMA: Ministério do Meio Ambiente
