= Immediate Geographic Region of Itabira =

Urban administrative region in Minas Gerais, Brazil

The Immediate Geographic Region of Itabira, in the state of Minas Gerais, Brazil.

The Immediate Geographic Region of Itabira is one of the 10 immediate geographic regions in the Intermediate Geographic Region of Belo Horizonte, which is one of the 70 immediate geographic regions in the Brazilian state of Minas Gerais and one of the 509 of Brazil. This classification was created by the National Institute of Geography and Statistics (IBGE) in 2017.

== Municipalities ==
It comprises 9 municipalities:

- Bom Jesus do Amparo
- Carmésia
- Ferros
- Itabira
- Itambé do Mato Dentro
- Passabém
- Santa Maria de Itabira
- Santo Antônio do Rio Abaixo
- São Sebastião do Rio Preto
