= Immediate Geographic Region of Belo Horizonte =

Urban administrative region in Minas Gerais, Brazil

The Immediate Geographic Region of Belo Horizonte, in the state of Minas Gerais, Brazil.

The Immediate Geographic Region of Belo Horizonte is one of the 10 immediate geographic regions in the Intermediate Geographic Region of Belo Horizonte, one of the 70 immediate geographic regions in the Brazilian state of Minas Gerais and one of the 509 of Brazil, created by the National Institute of Geography and Statistics (IBGE) in 2017.

== Municipalities ==
It comprises 29 municipalities:

- Belo Horizonte
- Betim
- Brumadinho
- Caeté
- Confins
- Contagem
- Esmeraldas
- Florestal
- Ibirité
- Igarapé
- Jaboticatubas
- Juatuba
- Lagoa Santa
- Mário Campos
- Mateus Leme
- Moeda
- Nova Lima
- Nova União
- Pedro Leopoldo
- Raposos
- Ribeirão das Neves
- Rio Acima
- Sabará
- Santa Luzia
- São Joaquim de Bicas
- São José da Lapa
- Sarzedo
- Taquaraçu de Minas
- Vespasiano

== See also ==
- List of Intermediate and Immediate Geographic Regions of Minas Gerais
