= Itabira =

- Municipality
- Municipality of Itabira
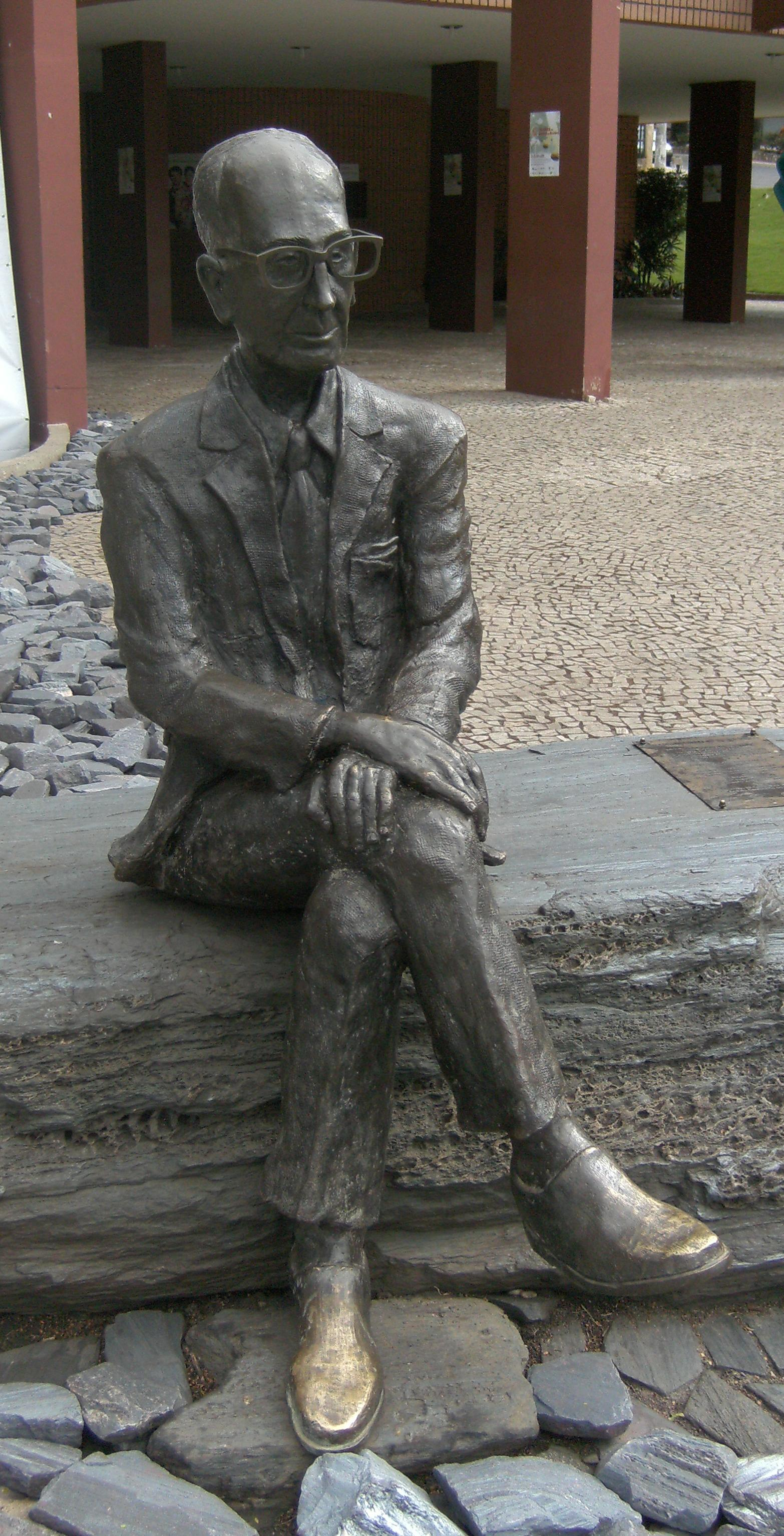
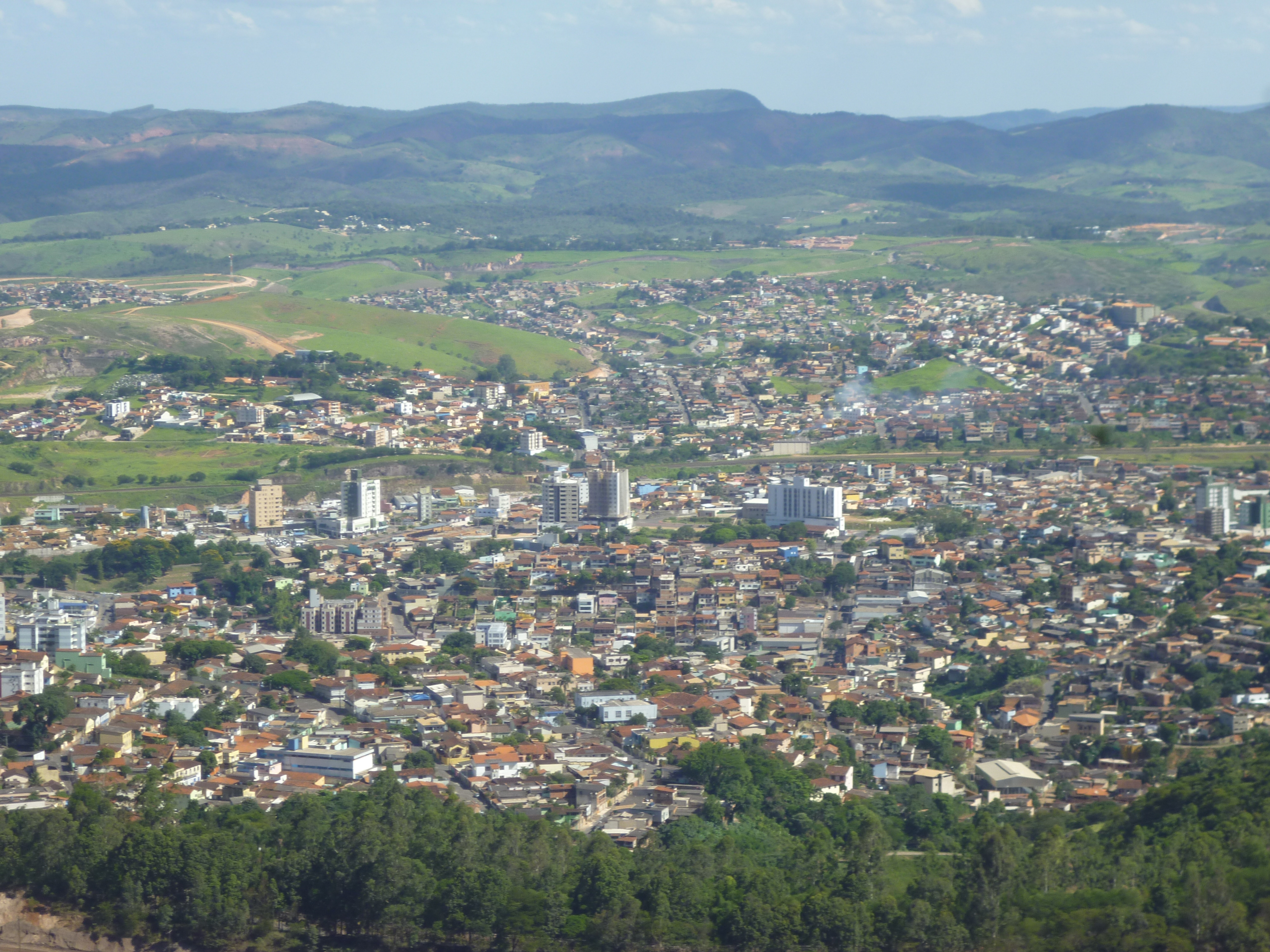
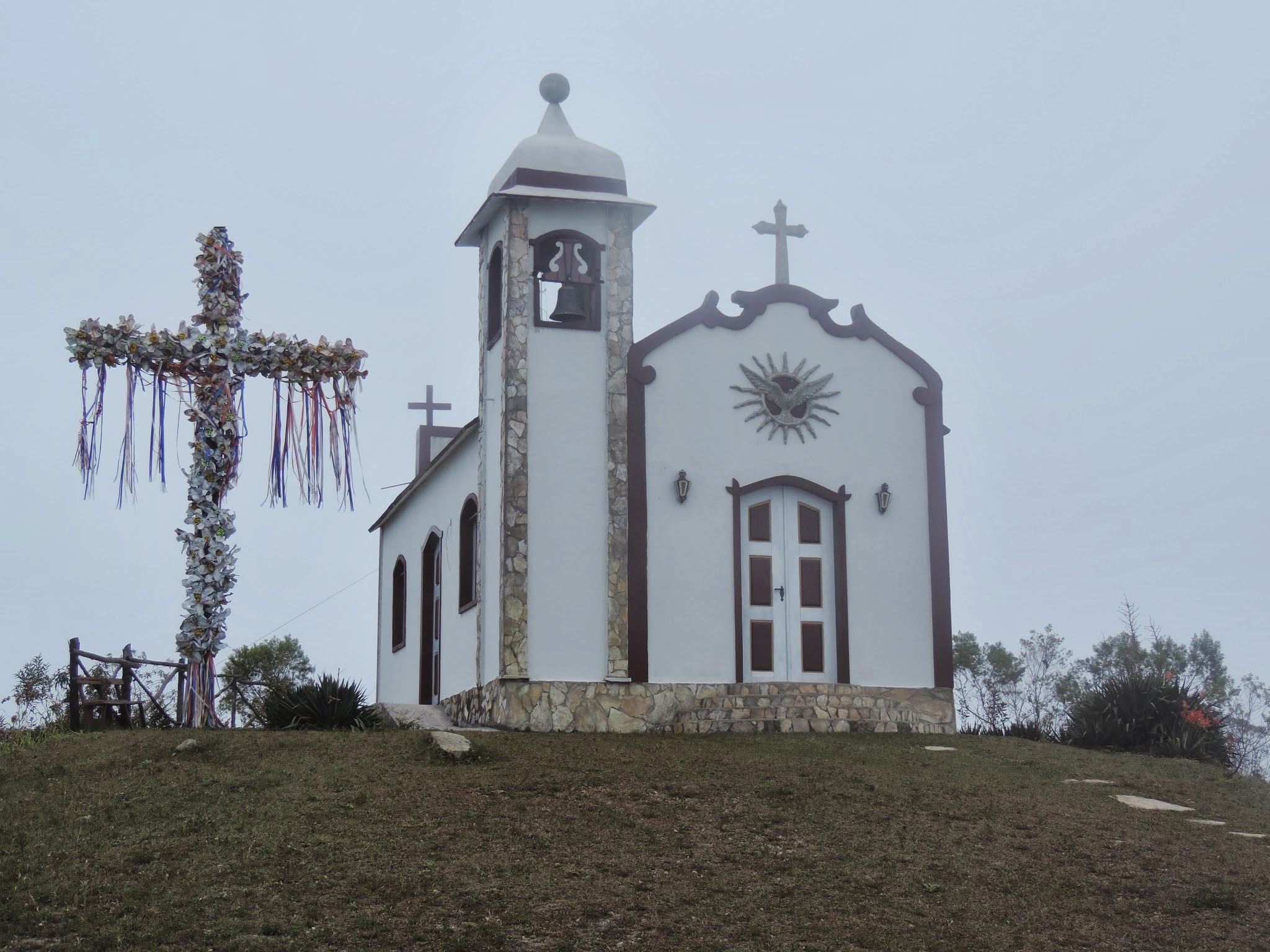
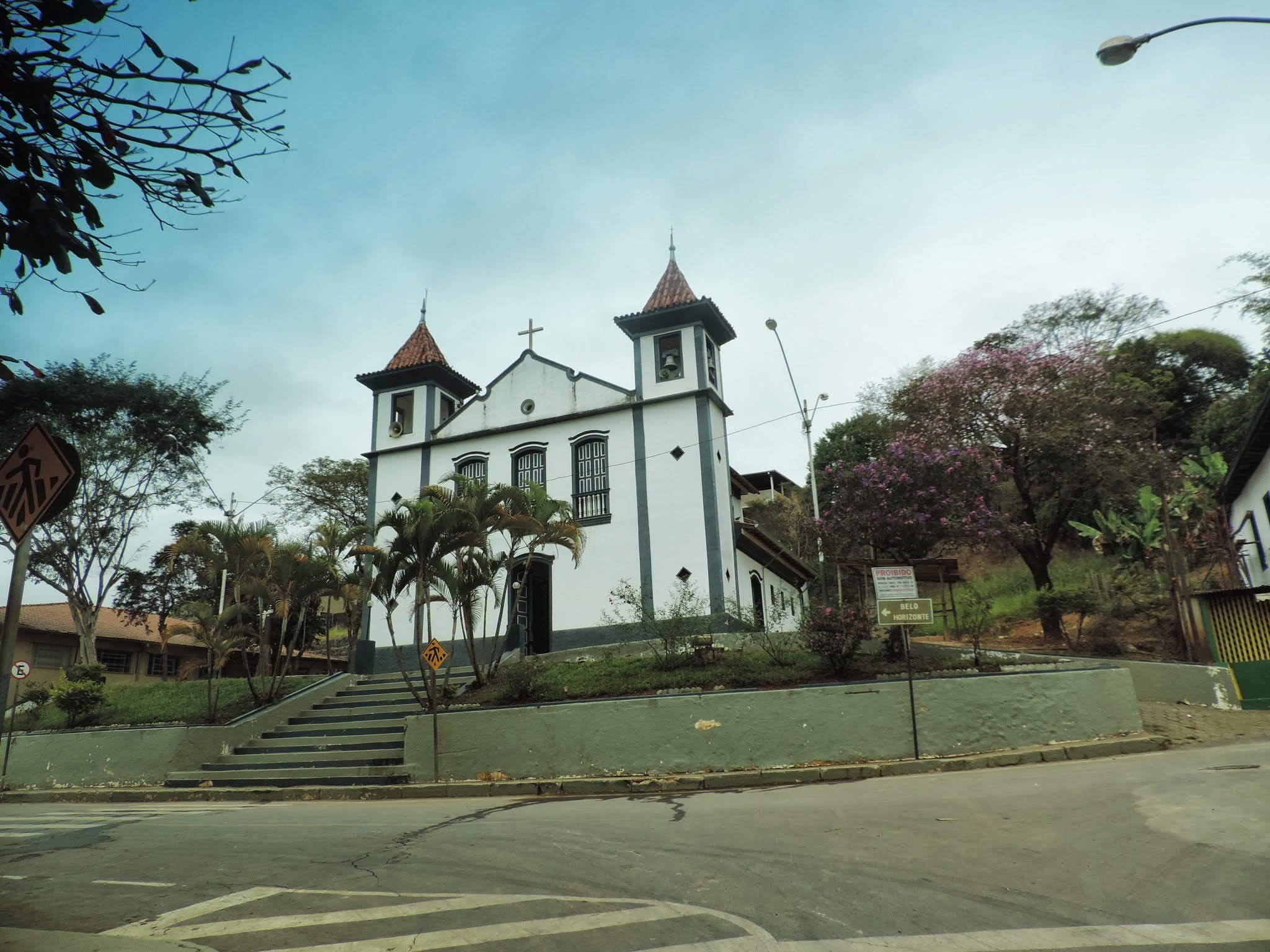
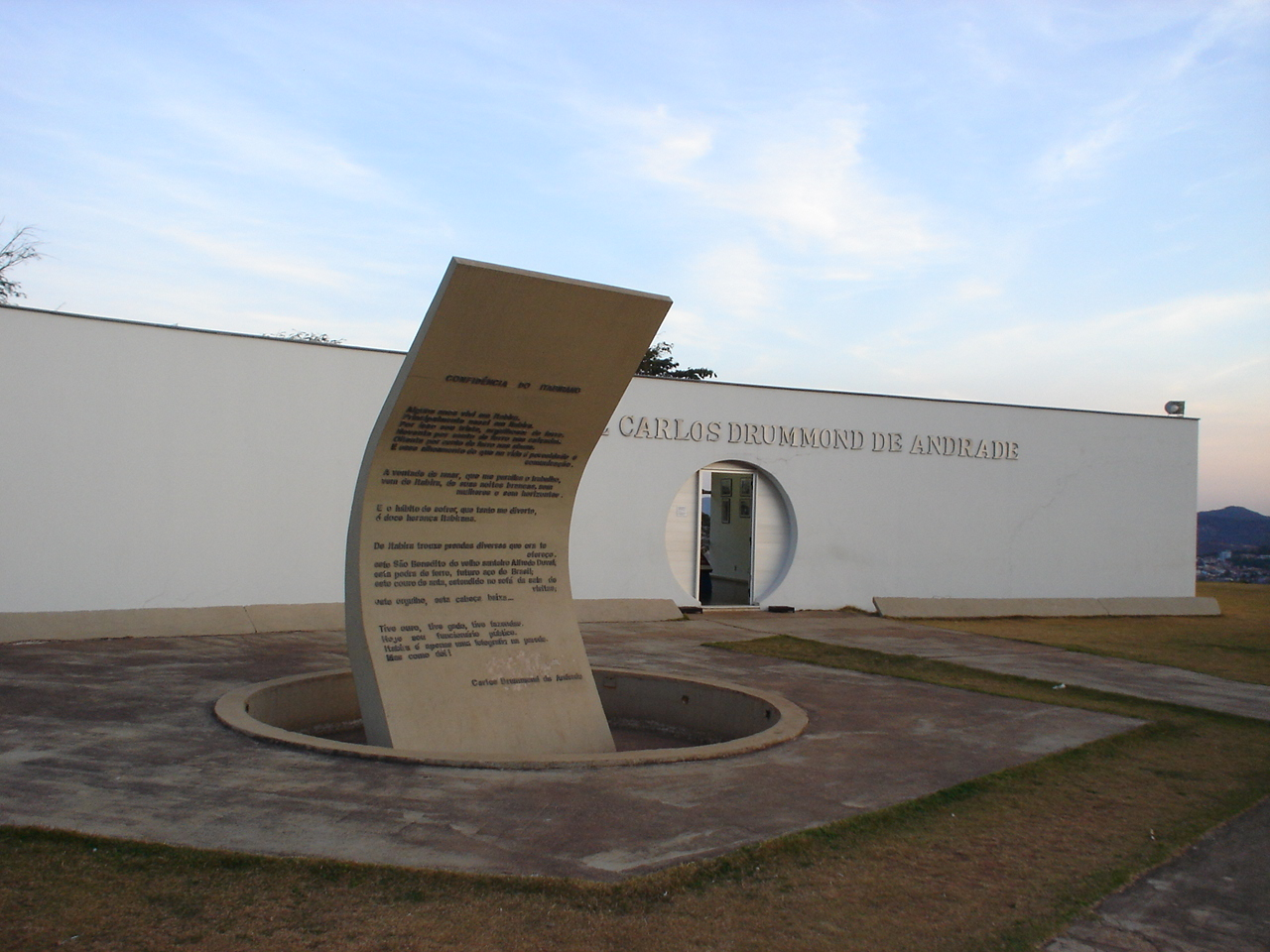
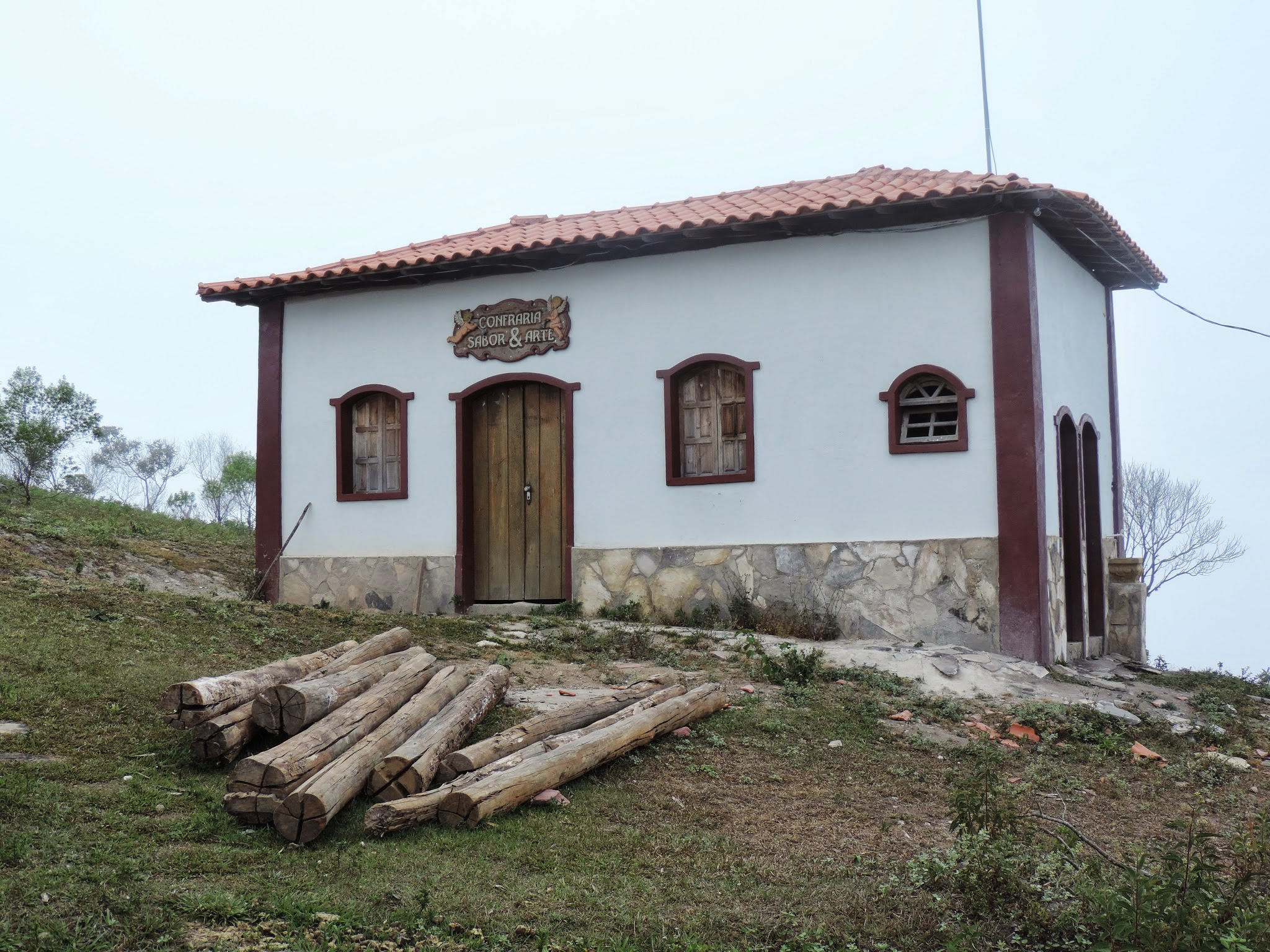

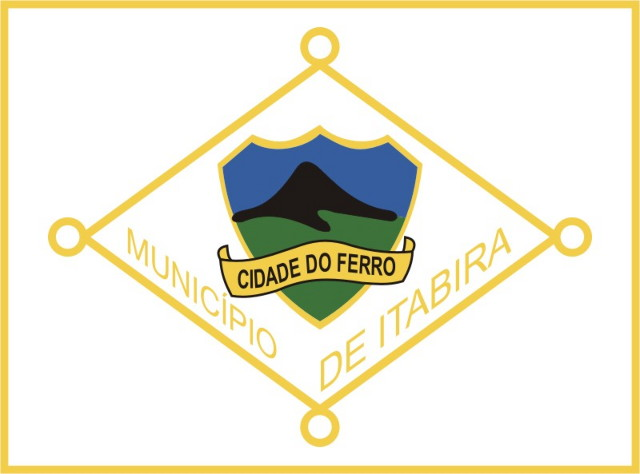
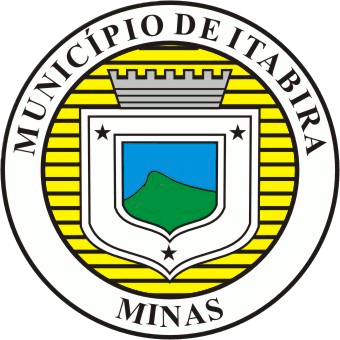
- Flag Coat of arms
- Nicknames: Cidade do Ferro ("City of Iron"); Cidade da Poesia ("City of Poetry"); Capital Nacional da Poesia ("National Capital of Poetry"); Capital Estadual do Tropeirismo ("State Capital of Tropeirismo"); Ita City
- Location in Minas Gerais

- Location in Brazil
- Coordinates: 19°37′08″S 43°13′37″W
- Country: Brazil
- State: Minas Gerais
- Region: Southeast
- Intermediate Region: Belo Horizonte
- Immediate Region: Itabira

Government
  - Mayor: Marco Antônio Lage (PSB)

Area
  - Total: 1,253.704 km^{2} (484.058 sq mi)
- Elevation: 795 m (2,608 ft)

Population (2022 Census)
  - Total: 113,343
  - Estimate (2025): 118,053
  - Density: 90.4065/km^{2} (234.152/sq mi)
- Demonym: itabirano
- Time zone: UTC−3 (BRT)
- HDI (2010): 0.756 – high
- Website: itabira.mg.gov.br

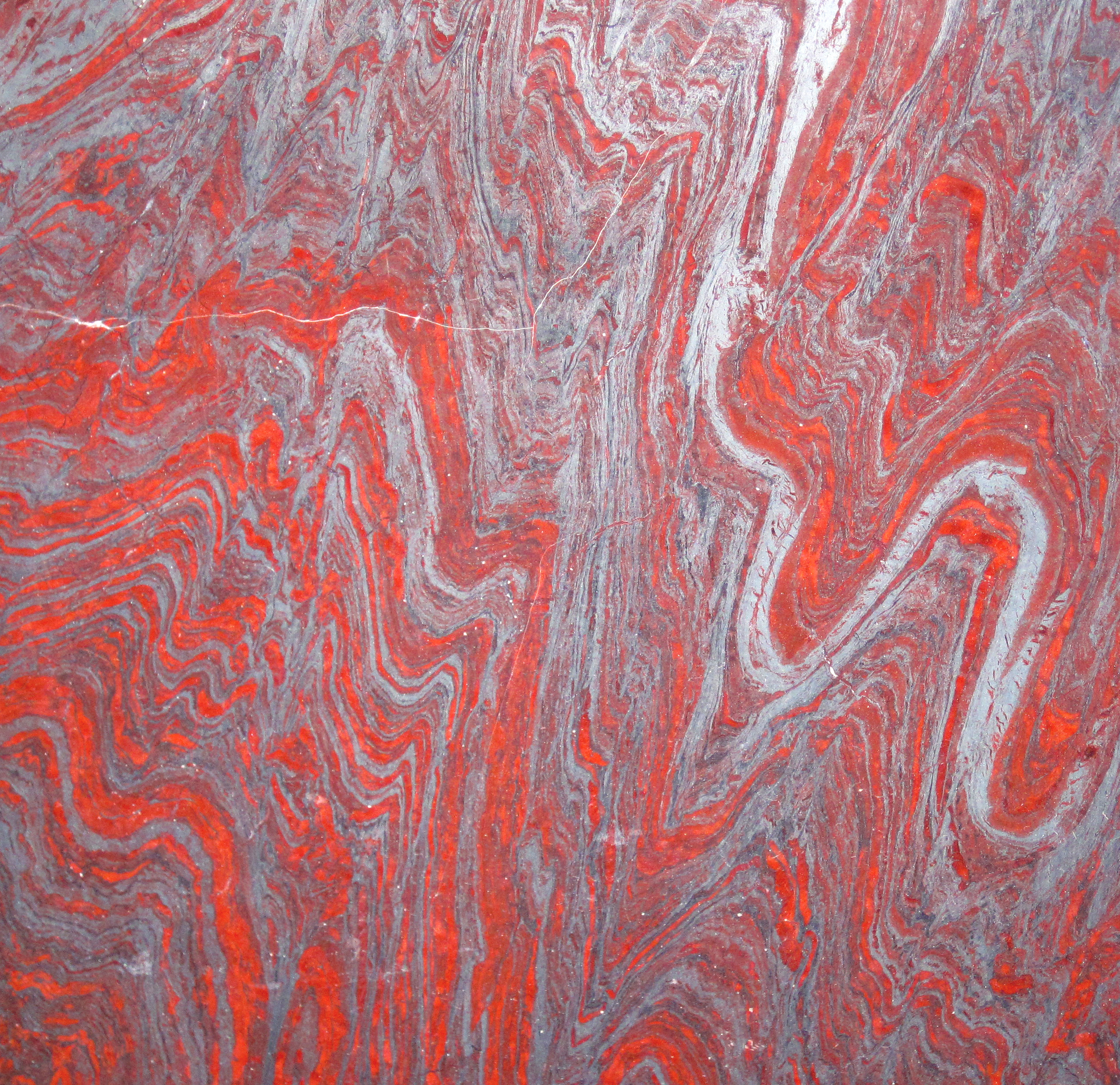
Banded Iron Formation or "itabirite", polished slab from the Paleoproterozoic-aged Minas Supergroup in the Iron Quadrangle District. The red bands are hematite, and the silver bands are magnetite. These are quarried, sawn, polished and sold as decorative stones.

Itabira is a Brazilian municipality and a major city in the state of Minas Gerais. The city belongs to the Belo Horizonte metropolitan area mesoregion and to the Itabira microregion.

It is currently the twenty-fourth largest city in the state in terms of population, with 113,343 inhabitants, according to the 2022 Census. It is known as the "Capital of Poetry", by virtue of being the birthplace of poet Carlos Drummond de Andrade, is part of the Circuit of the Gold and of Estrada Real.

== History ==
The first settlements at the site date to the early eighteenth century, when the village of Itabira do Mato Dentro was founded by bandeirantes seeking gold. Itabira was politically emancipated as a municipality on 9 October 1848, through Provincial Law No. 374.

== Geography ==
It is located in southeast Minas Gerais, 110 kilometers away from the state capital, Belo Horizonte and 845 kilometers away from the federal capital Brasília. The highest point in the city is 1,672 meters above sea level, and is known as Alto da Mutuca. Itabira is an access point for a number of smaller cities, such as Jaboticatubas, Santa Maria de Itabira, Itambé do Mato Dentro and Nova Era. The closest international airport is Tancredo Neves International Airport (Confins) in Belo Horizonte.

Itabira is a regional economic center, and hosts a thriving iron ore extraction operation headed by Companhia Vale do Rio Doce since 1942, when the company was created by President Getúlio Vargas specifically for the mineral exploration of the Rio Doce valley. As of 2017, it is the second largest mining company in the world, and a considerable part of its iron ore output comes from the mines at Itabira. As a result of the decades-old extraction operations, the city faces air pollution problems.

== Culture ==
In Carlos Drummond de Andrade's poem "Confidência do Itabirano," the speaker remarks:

"Tive ouro, tive gado, tive fazendas. Hoje sou funcionário público. Itabira é apenas uma fotografia na parede. Mas como dói!"	"I had gold, I had cattle, I had farms. Today I'm a public servant. Itabira is just a photograph on the wall. But oh, how it hurts!"

== Notable people ==
- Carlos Drummond de Andrade, poet and writer.
- Ana Beatriz Barros, Brazilian top model.
- Renan Oliveira, Brazilian footballer.
- Didi, former Brazilian footballer.
- Marco Túlio, Brazilian footballer.
- Talmo Oliveira, former volleyball player.
- Alessandro Vinícius, Brazilian footballer.
- Elke Maravilha, German-born Brazilian actress and TV personality, spent part of her childhood in Itabira.

== Sister cities - twin towns ==
Itabira has a one sister city:

Itajubá, Minas Gerais, Brazil

== See also ==
- List of municipalities in Minas Gerais
- Our Lady of the Rosary Cathedral, Itabira
