= Adeílson =

Brazilian footballer (born 1985)

Personal information
- Full name: Adeílson Pereira de Mello
- Date of birth: October 7, 1985 (age 41)
- Place of birth: Nova União, Brazil
- Height: 1.86 m (6 ft 1 in)
- Position: Striker

Senior career*
Years	Team	Apps	(Gls)
2002	Santa Cruz-MG		
2002	Real de Caeté		
2003	União Luziense-MG		
2004	Mamoré-MG		
2005	Democrata-MG		
2006	Guarani-SP		
2006–2007	Ipatinga	32	(?)
2008–2009	Tombense	0	(0)
2008	→ Ipatinga (loan)	31	(10)
2009–2011	Nice	11	(0)
2009	→ Fluminense (loan)	10	(0)
2010–2011	→ FC Istres (loan)	20	(5)
2011–	Tombense		
2011–2016	→ Criciúma (loan)	12	(0)
2012	→ América-MG (loan)	21	(3)
2013	→ Náutico (loan)	1	(0)
2013–2014	→ Al-Shabab Al Arabi (loan)	13	(8)
2016–2018	Ajman	56	(42)
2018–2019	Al Urooba	17	(7)
2019–2020	Tombense		
2020	Dibba Al-Fujairah	8	(4)
2020–2021	Al Dhaid	2	(0)
- * Club domestic league appearances and goals as of 19:31, 15 April 2023 (UTC)

Adeílson Pereira de Mello (born 7 October 1985 in Nova União), known simply as Adeílson, is a Brazilian professional football striker who plays for Al Dhaid.

== Career ==
Adeílson previously played for Guarani and Ipatinga.

In January 2009 he signed for Nice in a 3 1/2-year deal and on 8 July 2009 Fluminense have loaned the forward from French side OGC Nice.

After two years out on loan, he returned to Nice but left France to join Criciúma Esporte Clube on 9 July 2011.
