= Marinhos (quilombo) =

The Marinhos quilombola community is located in the district of São José do Paraopeba, a rural area of the municipality of Brumadinho, Minas Gerais.

== Community ==
Marinhos was initially populated by former slaves from the Silva farm located a few kilometers from the community. Along with the village, there are three other nearby communities: Rodrigues, Sapé and Ribeirão. The leader of Marinhos is Cambão. Marinhos, which in 2018 was inhabited by 80 families, received official recognition as a quilombola community in 2010, through a decree published in the Official Gazette of the Union (DOU), on November 4.
