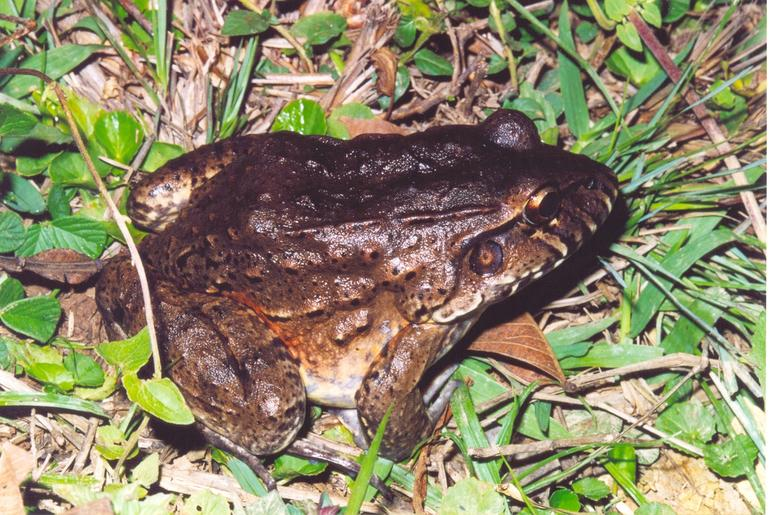

Conservation status
- Least Concern (IUCN 3.1)

Scientific classification
- Kingdom: Animalia
- Phylum: Chordata
- Class: Amphibia
- Order: Anura
- Family: Leptodactylidae
- Genus: Leptodactylus
- Species: L. labyrinthicus

Binomial name
- Leptodactylus labyrinthicus (Spix, 1824)

Synonyms
- Rana labyrinthica Spix, 1824; Rana marginata Steindachner, 1867; Leptodactylus wuchereri Jiménez de la Espada, 1875; Leptodactylus bufo Andersson, 1911; Leptodactylus pentadactylus mattogrossensis Schmidt and Inger, 1951

= Leptodactylus labyrinthicus =

Species of frog

Leptodactylus labyrinthicus is a species of frog in the family Leptodactylidae. Its common names are labyrinth frog, pepper frog, South American pepper frog, and pepper foam frog. This frog is found in central and southeastern Brazil, northeast Argentina (Misiones and Corrientes Provinces), and eastern Paraguay. Earlier reports from Bolivia refer to Leptodactylus vastus, or possibly an unnamed species.

== Description ==
This species is a large frog, with the snout-vent length of males measuring 117–188 mm (4.6–7.4 in) and that of females 124–166 mm (4.9–6.5 in) in snout–vent length. The labyrinth-related names of this frog refer to the labyrinthine patterns it has on its belly, which is often light with dark vermiculations.

Tadpoles are cryptic colored, with a dark gray back and tail.

== Ecology and behaviour ==
Leptodactylus labyrinthicus has been observed in many types of habitats, including grasslands, primary and secondary forest, streams, ponds, riversides, pastures, Amazônia, Caatinga, Cerrado, Pampa, and Pantanal biomes at elevations up to 1,000 m (3,300 ft) above sea level. It has been found mostly in open habitats, with the Amazon rainforest and Amazon River blocking its natural range, although small populations have been introduced in Amazonia. It appears to be very tolerant to pollution.

Due to this wide range of broad habitats, as of 2023, this frog is not considered threatened by the IUCN. It has been observed in many protected areas, including Cerro Corá National Park, Natural Reserve del Bosque Mbaracayú, Parque Nacional Da Serra Da Bodoquena, Estação Ecológica De Itirapina, Parque Estadual Do Jurupará, Estação Ecológica Dos Caetetus, Parque Estadual Do Morro Do Diabo, Área de Proteção Ambiental Morro Da Pedreira, and Parque Estadual Das Furnas Do Bom Jesus.

This frog is a generalist and opportunistic predator. It has been known to eat invertebrates, amphibians, lizards, snakes, rodents and tailed tailless bats.

The eggs of L. labyrinthicus are laid in foam nests, often in burrows on dry land or in swampy soil near water. It is hypothesized that the male frog finds or possibly creates the burrow in a suitable location and uses it as shelter during the reproductive season. The male makes advertisement calls mostly at night, though it has been observed calling during the day as well. After mating, the female frog lays both fertilized eggs and trophic eggs at one time and then does not return to the nest.

The tadpoles hatch and feed on the trophic eggs; they can remain in the nest for up to 25 days, growing in size. At the start of the rainy season, the tadpoles move to lentic water, where they will complete their metamorphosis, feeding on anuran eggs, other tadpoles, and carrion. Other frog species do not lay their eggs until the first heavy rains; the head-start of the L. labyrinthicus tadpoles allows them to take advantage of the eggs and newly hatched tadpoles of other frog species. L. labyrinthicus tadpoles are mostly active at night, and hide from visual predators (including birds such as the creamy-bellied thrush) during the day by burrowing in gravel and leaves.

== Use by humans ==
This frog is used for human consumption. It is harvested in Venezuela, and attempts have been made to establish farms for commercial production in Brazil (although these failed for managerial reasons).

The antimicrobial peptide pentadactylin has been isolated from the skin secretions of L. labyrinthicus and studied as a potential agent for use in chemotherapy.
