= Esmeraldas, Minas Gerais =

City and municipality in Minas Gerais, Brazil

Coordinates: 19°45′46″S 44°18′50″W

Esmeraldas
- Municipality
- Municipality of Esmeraldas
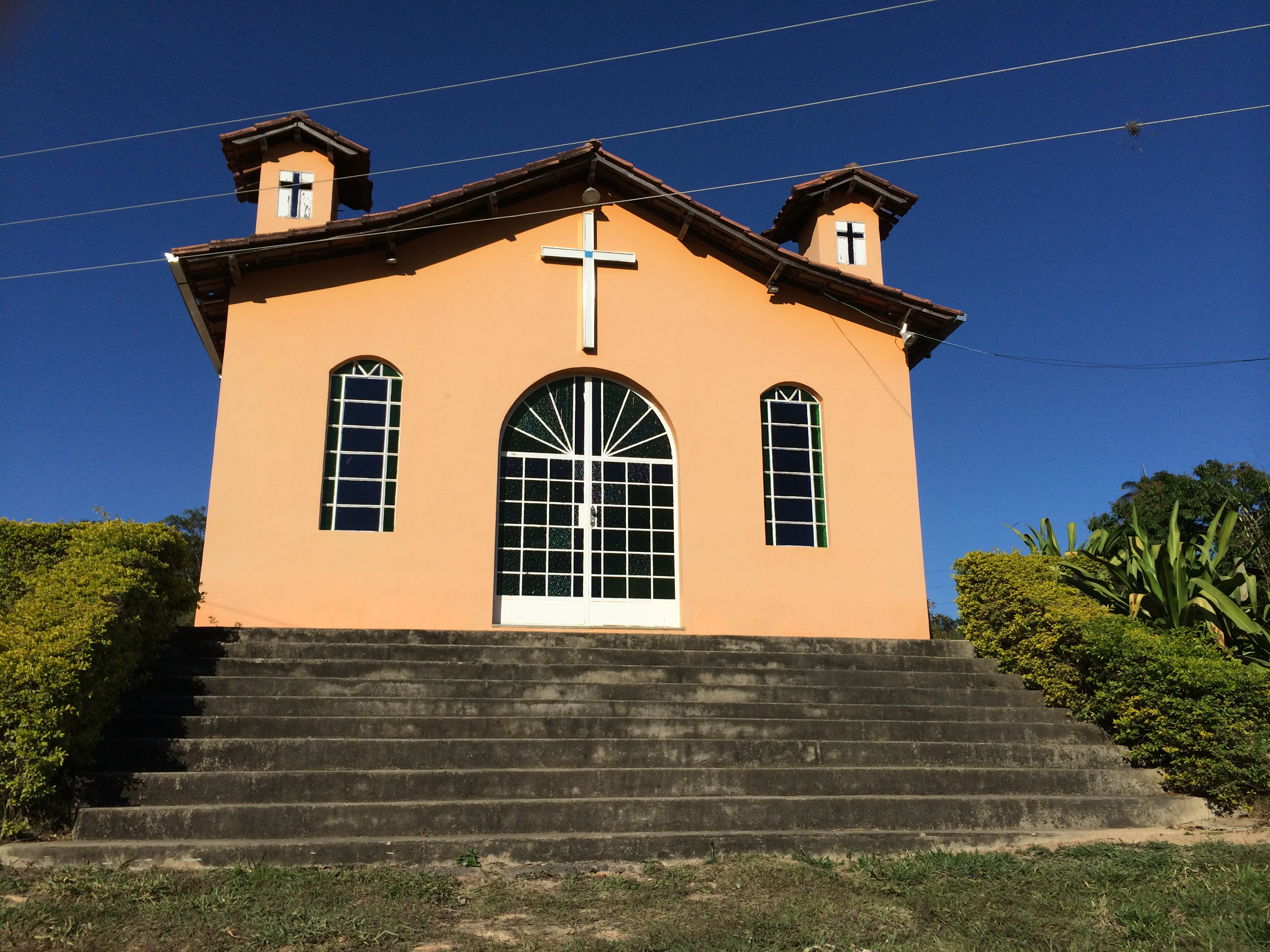

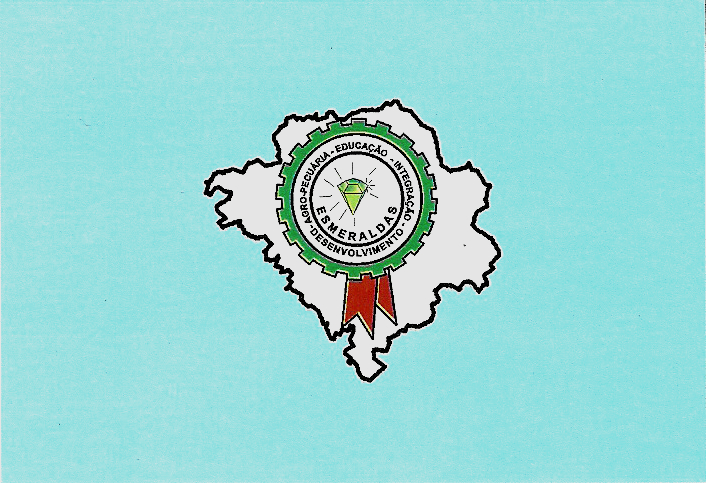
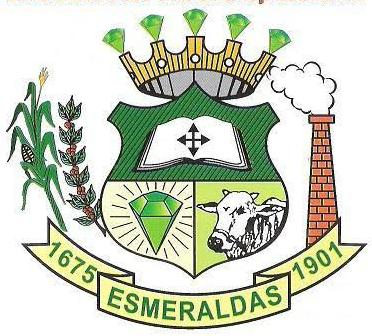
- Flag Coat of arms

- Location in the state of Minas Gerais
- Country: Brazil
- State: Minas Gerais
- Region: Southeast
- Intermediate Region: Belo Horizonte
- Immediate Region: Belo Horizonte
- Founded: 16 September 1901

Government
  - Mayor: Marcelo Nonato Figueiredo (SD)

Area
  - Total: 909.592 km^{2} (351.195 sq mi)

Population (2022 Census)
  - Total: 85,598
  - Estimate (2025): 93,103
  - Density: 94.106/km^{2} (243.73/sq mi)
- Demonym: esmeraldense
- Time zone: UTC−3 (BRT)
- Postal Code: 32800-000 to 32824-999
- HDI (2010): 0.671 – medium
- Website: www.esmeraldas.mg.gov.br

Esmeraldas is a Brazilian municipality located in the state of Minas Gerais. The city belongs to the mesoregion Metropolitana de Belo Horizonte and to the microregion of Belo Horizonte. In 2025 its population was estimated to be 93,103.

== See also ==
- List of municipalities in Minas Gerais
