= Helena Antipoff =

Brazilian psychologist

- Born: 25 March 1892; Grodno, Russian Empire
- Died: 9 August 1974 (aged 82); Ibirité, Brazil
- Education: University of Sorbonne
- Occupation: Psychologist

Helena Wladimirna Antipoff (25 March 1892 – 9 August 1974) was a Russian-born Brazilian psychologist. Born in Grodno in what is now Belarus to an aristocratic family, they moved from the Russian Empire to Paris due to increasing social unrest. While there, Antipoff earned a bachelor's degree from the University of Sorbonne in 1911 and interned under Théodore Simon in Alfred Binet's laboratory. Antipoff spent the next four years at the Jean-Jacques Rousseau Institute to study under Édouard Claparède, graduating with a degree in educational psychology. While there, she became a proponent of the active school style of education, focusing on autonomous learning for students.

Antipoff moved back to Russia in 1916 to take care of her father, who had been injured in World War I. She stayed in Russia until 1924, marrying Victor Iretzky and having a son, Daniel Iretzky Antipoff, during that time. In 1924, she published an article about the cognitive abilities in children, which the Soviet regime claimed was trying to push upper-class superiority; the family fled to Germany the following year as a result. In 1929, after continuing to study with Claparède and after her and her husband separated, Antipoff was invited to teach as a new Teachers College in Belo Horizonte, which she accepted. Her contract was renewed after the initial two years, and she stayed there until 1937. Her contributions to the college included founding the Pestalozzi Society, which was a collaboration between doctors, philanthropists, and others to treat children with mental disabilities.

After her tenure at the Teachers College ended, Antipoff remained in Brazil, and began to work with children in more rural areas, and founded the Fazenda do Rosário (Rosary Farm), which worked with abandoned children with mental disabilities, combining cultivating and farm work along with education. She also taught Educational Psychology at the Federal University of Minas Gerais after becoming a Brazilian citizen in 1952. After her death in 1974, the Helena Antipoff Foundation was established, which continues her work. Minas Gerais Governor Milton Campos said of her and of the foundation: "She planted ten thousand seeds in our wilderness. All teachers and students whose lives she touched will now continue her work."
