= Brumadinho dam disaster =

2019 dam collapse in Brumadinho, Brazil

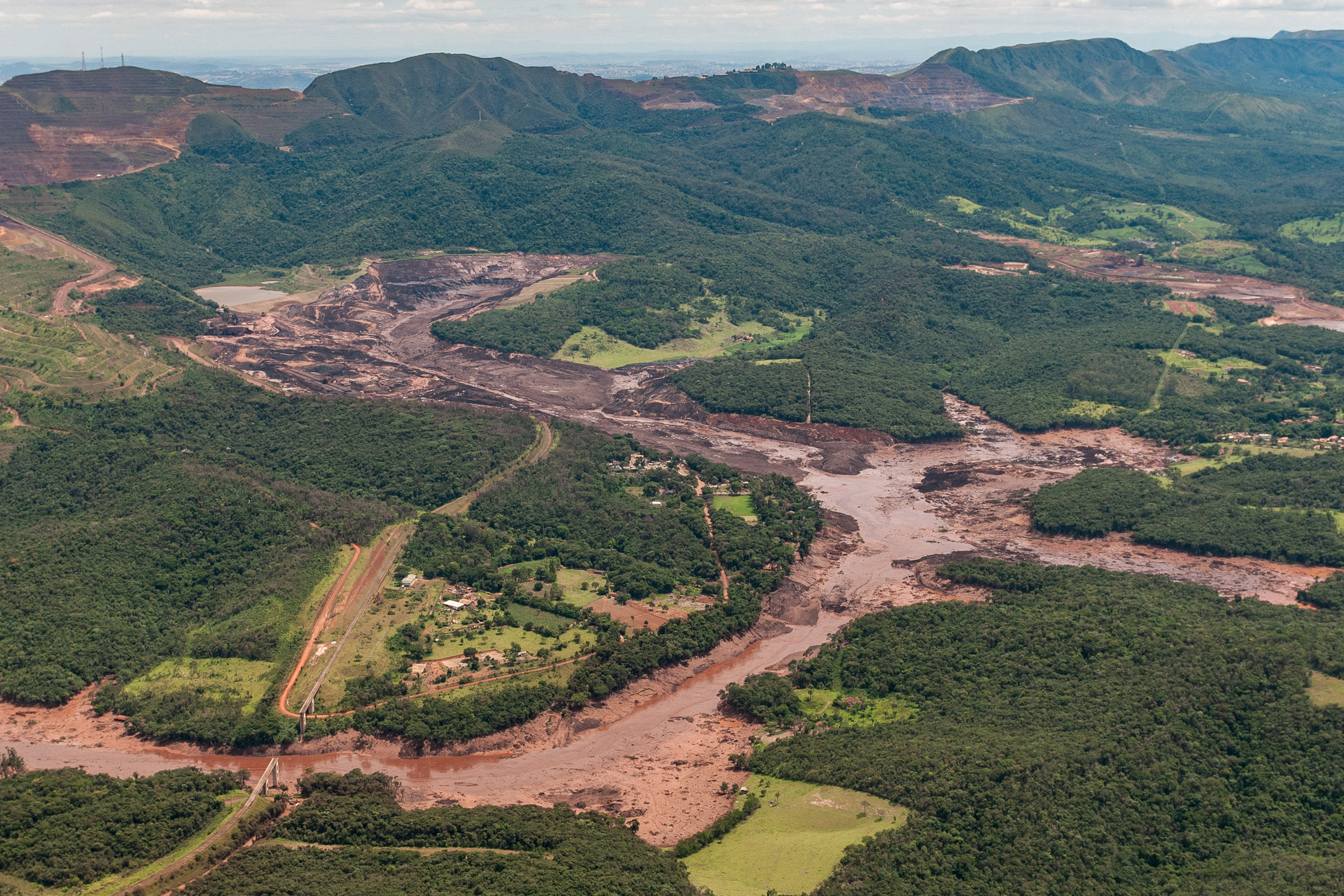
- Aftermath of the Brumadinho dam disaster
- Date: 25 January 2019
- Location: Córrego do Feijão iron ore mine, Brumadinho, Minas Gerais, Brazil; 20°07′11″S 44°07′17″W
- Type: Dam failure
- Participants: Vale
- Deaths: 272 (including 2 stillbirths)
- Missing: 6 (included in reported deaths)
- Arrests: 13

The Brumadinho dam disaster occurred on 25 January 2019 when a tailings dam at the Córrego do Feijão iron ore mine suffered a catastrophic failure. The dam, located 9 kilometres (5.6 mi) east of Brumadinho in Minas Gerais, Brazil, is owned by the mining company Vale, which was also involved in the Mariana dam disaster of 2015. The collapse of the dam released a mudflow that engulfed the mine's headquarters, including a cafeteria during lunchtime, along with houses, farms, inns, and roads downstream. 270 people died as a result of the collapse, of whom 259 were officially confirmed dead, in January 2019, and 11 others were reported as missing. As of January 2022, six people were still missing.

== Background ==
The Córrego do Feijão tailings dam, built in 1976 by Ferteco Mineração and acquired by the iron ore mining corporation Vale S.A. in 2001, was classified as a small structure with low risk of high potential damage, according to the registry of the National Mining Agency. In a statement, the State Department of Environment and Sustainable Development reported that the venture was duly licensed. In December 2018, Vale obtained a license to reuse waste from the dam (about 11.7 million cubic meters) and to close down activities. The dam had not received tailings since 2014 and, according to the company, underwent bi-weekly field inspections.

It was reported that Vale S.A. had knowledge of the problems with sensors designed to monitor the dam's structural integrity, raising questions about whether there were missed warnings ahead of the dam burst.

=== Mariana dam disaster ===
The Brumadinho dam failure occurred three years and two months after the Mariana dam disaster of November 2015, which killed 19 people and destroyed the village of Bento Rodrigues. The Mariana disaster is considered the worst environmental disaster in Brazil's history and as of January 2019 was still under investigation. Brazil's weak regulatory structures and regulatory gaps allowed the Mariana dam's failure. Three years after the Mariana dam’s collapse, the companies involved in that environmental disaster had paid only 3.4% of the R$785 million in fines. In November 2015, the department in charge of inspecting mining operations in the state of Minas Gerais, the National Department of Mineral Production (DNPM), was worried about the retirement of another 40% of public employees over the course of the next two years.

== Collapse ==
Satellite image of Brumadinho before and after the dam collapse

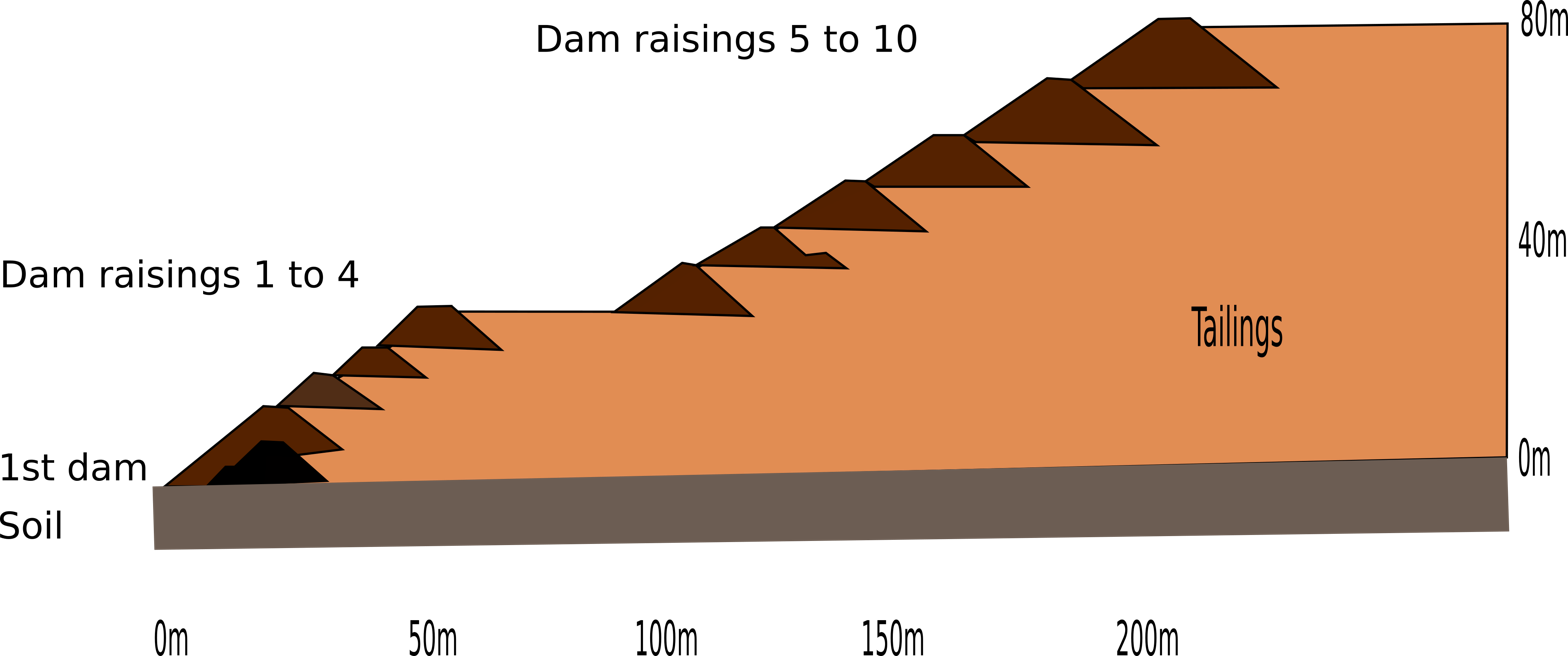
Schematic cross section showing design of failed dam

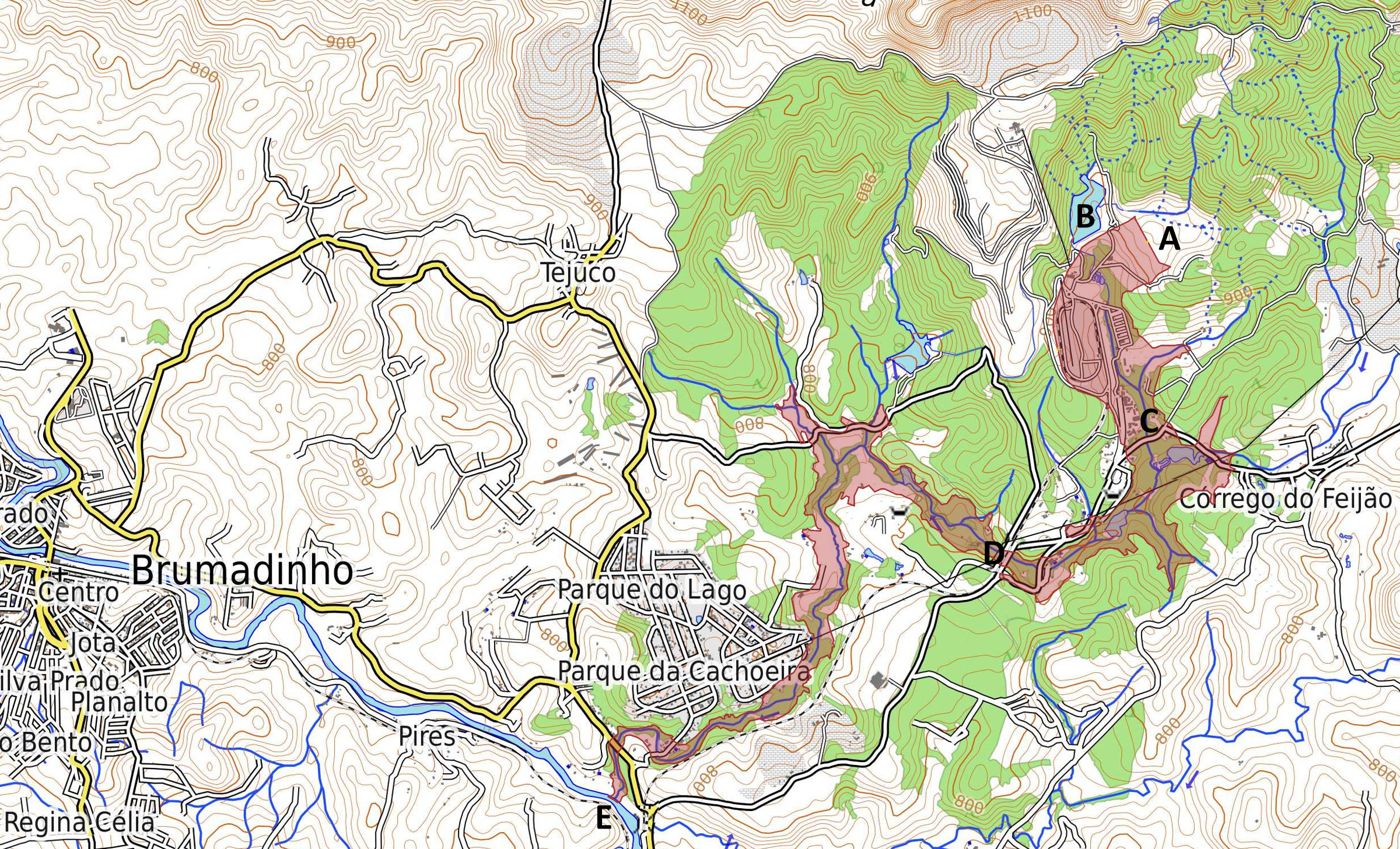
Path of mudflow after dam failure

Córrego do Feijão's Dam I collapsed just after noon, at 12:28 p.m. on 25 January 2019, unleashing a toxic tidal wave of around 12 million cubic metres of tailings. The mudflow quickly engulfed the mine's administrative area, burying hundreds of the mine's employees alive, including scores in the cafeteria during their lunch break. The deluge of mining waste continued downhill towards "Vila Ferteco", a small community about 1 kilometre (0.62 mi) from the mine, killing at least seven people at a bed and breakfast and collapsing a railway bridge along the way. By 3:50 p.m., the mud had travelled over 5 kilometres (3.1 mi), reaching the Paraopeba River, the region's main river, which supplies water to one-third of the Greater Belo Horizonte region.

The Inhotim Institute, one of largest open-air art centres in Latin America, located in Brumadinho, was evacuated as a precaution, although the mudflow did not reach the sculpture park.

On 27 January, around 5:30 a.m., sirens were sounded amid fears for the stability of the mine's adjacent Dam VI, a process water reservoir, where increased water levels were detected. Due to the risk, about 24,000 residents from several districts of Brumadinho were evacuated, including the city's downtown area. Rescue operations were suspended for several hours.

== Aftermath ==
=== Victims ===
On 26 January 2019, Vale president Fabio Schvartsman said that most victims were Vale employees. Three locomotives and 132 wagons were buried and four railway workers were missing. The mud destroyed two sections of a railway bridge and about 100 metres of railway track. As of January 2020, 259 people were confirmed dead, and 11 were considered missing. Figures were later amended to 270 deaths.

=== Environment ===
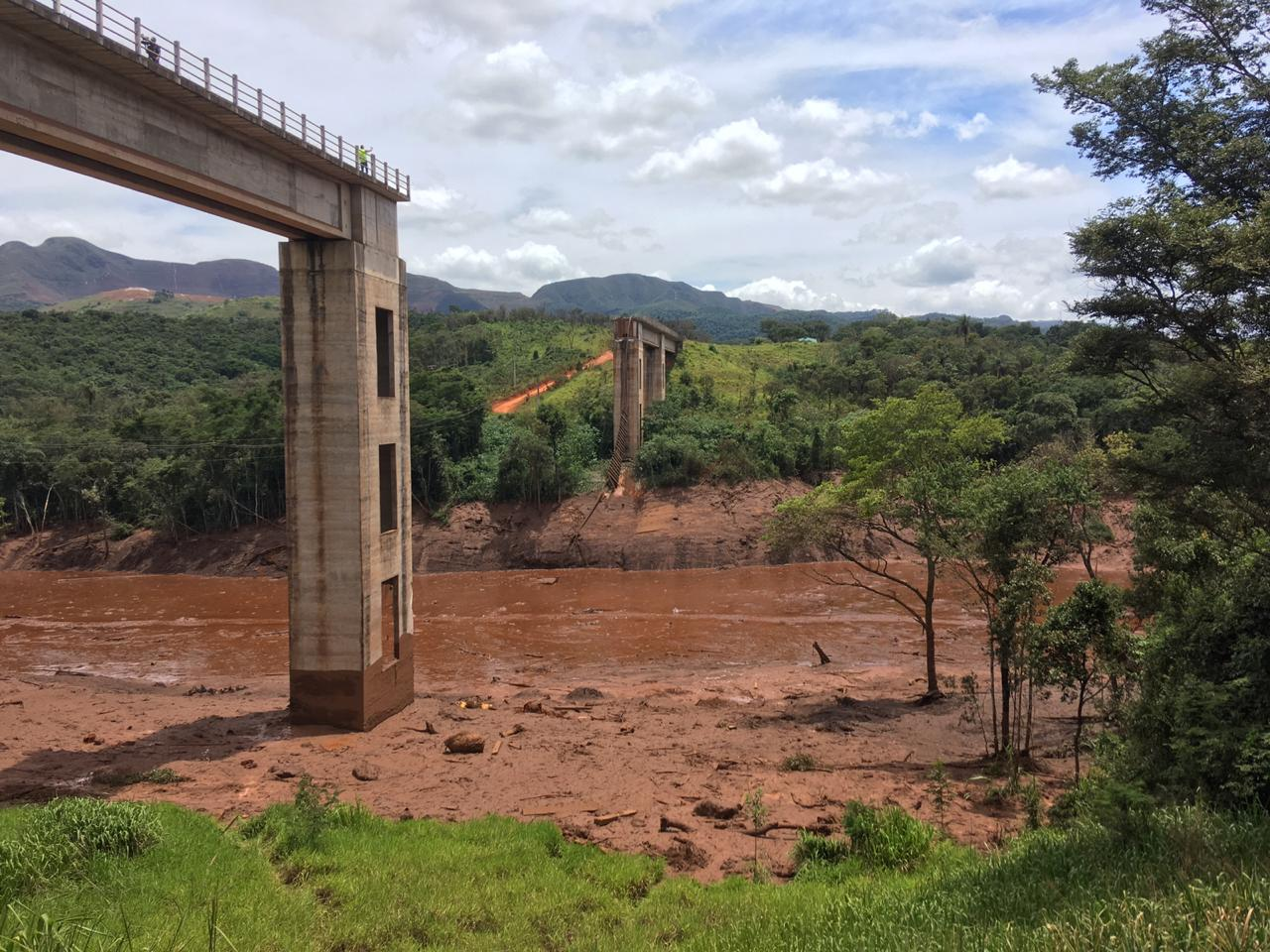
Iron ore railway bridge destroyed by mudflow, 3 kilometres (1.9 mi) downstream from collapsed dam

The dam failure released around 12 million cubic metres of tailings. Metals in the tailings were incorporated into the river sediments, with a higher concentration closer to the site of the spill. Analyses of the river sediment were conducted downstream for 27 elements, showing some minor increases in metal concentrations. Severe concentrations of cadmium were found at Retiro Baixo, some 302 km (188 mi) downstream from the mine site.

Vale's president, Fabio Schvartsman, said the dam had been inactive since 2015 and that the waste would not have a large displacement. He said the environmental risk would be much lower than that of Mariana.

Schvartsman was refuted by the executive superintendent of the Minas Gerais Association for the Defense of the Environment (AMDA), Maria Dalce Ricas, who stated there would be a major environmental impact due to the geographic characteristics of the region. According to her assessment, the flow of waste through the valley of the Serra dos Dois Irmãos would cross the road that links Belo Horizonte to Brumadinho and continue toward the Paraopeba River valley, an important conservation area of the endangered Atlantic Forest and its endemic fauna. That meant the toxic waste would certainly destroy part of the forest, killing many wild animals until it reached the river. She also stated that it would be difficult to assess the potential consequences for the river, which was already weakened and in poor condition, but which still provided water for part of the population and that, with the toxic mud, the water could no longer be consumed, and its collection should be interrupted.

=== Economic impact ===
As a result of the disaster, on 28 January the Vale S.A. stock price fell 24%, losing 71.3 billion reais (US$19 billion) in market capitalization, the biggest single-day loss in the history of the Brazilian stock market, surpassing May 2018, when Petrobrás lost more than R$47 billion in market value. By the end of 28 January, Vale's debt was downgraded to a rating of BBB− by Fitch Ratings.

In the city of Brumadinho, many agricultural areas were affected or totally destroyed. The local livestock industry suffered damage, mainly from the loss of animals such as cattle and poultry. The local market was also impacted due to the damage, with some stores and establishments remaining closed for a few days.

=== Impact on the public water supply ===
The water supply company Companhia de Saneamento de Minas Gerais stated that the tailings had not compromised public water supply, but as a precaution, suspended collection of the river water in the communities of Brumadinho, Juatuba, and Pará de Minas. Due to the importance of the river for the municipality, the Agência Reguladora dos Serviços de Água e Esgoto de Pará de Minas reported that operations could go on as normal.

Following assessment by state and federal health, environment, and agriculture agencies, the Minas Gerais Government announced on 31 January that raw water from the Paraopeba River, from its confluence with Ribeirão Ferro-Carvão to Pará de Mina, posed risks to human and animal health and should not be consumed. Tests demonstrated that twenty other municipalities were affected by the dam's collapse. The effects of the pollution impacted communities at least 120 km (75 mi) beyond Brumadinho.

=== Reactions ===
President of Brazil Jair Bolsonaro sent three ministers to follow the rescue efforts. The Governor of Minas Gerais, Romeu Zema, announced the formation of a task force to rescue the victims.

The Israeli government sent a team of 130 specialist engineers, doctors, search and rescue personnel, firefighters and naval divers to Brumadinho to aid Brazilian specialists in finding possible survivors.

On 29 January, Brazilian authorities issued arrest warrants for five employees of the mine. Two senior managers of the mine and a Vale employee were arrested, alongside two engineers from the German company TÜV Süd, who had been contracted to inspect the dam.

The local mining union's treasurer called the disaster "premeditated" as there were continuous and long-standing complaints and warnings about the structural integrity of the dam. Vale denied these charges and stated that the mine was up to date with the latest standards.

One day after the disaster, the Brazilian Institute of Environment and Renewable Natural Resources announced a R$250 million fine on the Vale company. Brazilian judicial authorities froze US$3 billions of Vale's assets, mentioning that the company's real estate and vehicles would be seized if the company failed to comply with the fines .

In April, Vale's safety inspectors refused to guarantee the stability of at least 18 of its dams and dikes in Brazil.

Brazilian prosecutors announced in January 2020 that Vale SA, auditor TÜV Süd, and 16 individuals, including Vale's ex-president Fabio Schvartsman, would be charged with intentional homicide and environmental crimes. In January 2021, a group of Brazilian claimants brought the first civil lawsuit on German soil against TÜV Süd.

In February 2021, the state government reached an agreement with Vale to repair all environmental damage, and to pay the affected communities socio-economic and socio-environmental reparations, initially estimated at US$7 billion.

== See also ==
- Ajka alumina plant accident
- Church Rock uranium mill spill
