= Serra do Rola-Moça State Park =

State park in Minas Gerais, Brazil

- Parque Estadual da Serra do Rola-Moça
- IUCN category II (national park)
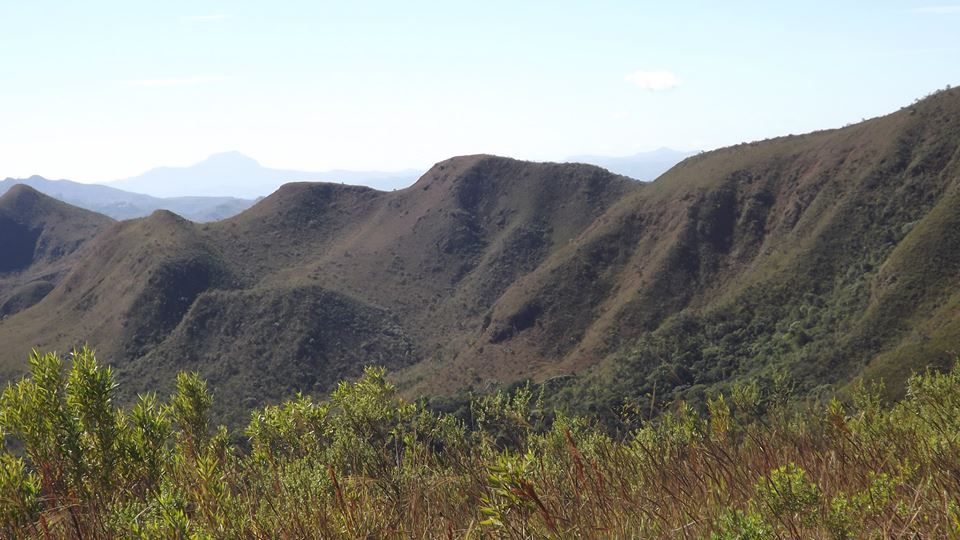
- Escarpment of the Serra do Rola-Moça

- Location within Brazil
- Nearest city: Belo Horizonte, Minas Gerais
- Coordinates: 20°02′30″S 44°00′36″W
- Area: 3,941.09 ha (15.2166 sq mi)
- Designation: State park
- Created: 27 September 1994
- Administrator: IEF: Instituto Estadual de Florestas

The Serra do Rola-Moça State Park (Portuguese: Parque Estadual da Serra do Rola-Moça, lit. 'Tumbling Maiden Hill'), is a state park in the state of Minas Gerais, Brazil. It protects a rugged area in the transition zone between cerrado and Atlantic Forest. Springs in the park are important to the water supply of the state capital, Belo Horizonte.

== Location ==
The Serra do Rola-Moça State Park is in the metropolitan region of Belo Horizonte, divided between the municipalities of Belo Horizonte, Nova Lima, Ibirité and Brumadinho. It has an area of 3,941.09 hectares (9,738.6 acres). It contains six important springs that supply water to the city, and this area is closed to the public.

== History ==
The Serra do Rola-Moça State Park was created by governor Hélio Garcia by decree 36.071 of 27 September 1994. The Taboão, Rola-Moça, Barreirinho, Barreiro, Mutuca and Catarina water basins in the park protect the water sources used by the Minas Gerais Sanitation Company (COPASA/MG). Activities such as leisure and tourism that may interfere with biota in these areas were therefore prohibited, and the areas were administered by COPASA/MG. The State Forestry Institute (IEF) was made responsible for overall administration of the park and for developing plans for administration and environmental education. The consultative council included representatives of government and civil society organizations.

== Environment ==
The park is in the transition zone between cerrado and Atlantic Forest. It contains areas of Atlantic Forest, cerrado, Alpine tundra and rupestrian ferruginous fields. The ferruginous field vegetation, growing on the iron-bearing "canga" crust, is extremely rare and is found only in the iron quadrilateral of Minas Gerais and in the Carajás Mountains in the state of Pará. Visits to these fields are allowed only when accompanied by park monitors.

The park has diverse flora with species of the Orchidaceae, Bromeliaceae families and jacaranda, arnica and cedrus genera. Species include Cariniana legalis, Gochnatia polymorpha and Vellozia squamata. The park provides a refuge for endangered fauna such as the cougar (Puma concolor), ocelot (Leopardus pardalis), oncilla (Leopardus tigrinus), maned wolf (Chrysocyon brachyurus), Pampas deer (Ozotoceros bezoarticus) and solitary tinamou (Tinamus solitarius).

== Visiting ==
The park is open from 8:00 am to 5:00 pm daily. Camping is not allowed. Access to trails, springs, waterfalls and nurseries requires advance scheduling. At the Nova Lima entrance there is a visitor center with an auditorium for 90 people, meeting rooms and rooms for the environmental police. At the Barreiro entrance in Belo Horizonte there is an auditorium for 60 people, offices, employee residences and the base of the environmental police. The park has hiking trails and lookouts. The Três Pedras, Planeta, Jatobá and Morro dos Veados lookouts provide panoramic views. The best time to visit is between April and October, when there is less rain.

== Sources ==
- Garcia, Hélio (27 September 1994), Decreto nº 36.071, de 27 de setembro de 1994 (PDF) (in Portuguese), State of Minas Gerais
- "Mirante dos Veados - Parque Estadual do Rola Moça", Portal de Brumadinho (in Portuguese)
- Parque Estadual da Serra do Rola-Moça (in Portuguese), IEF, archived from the original on 2016-07-11
