= Brumadinho =

- Municipality
- Municipality of Brumadinho
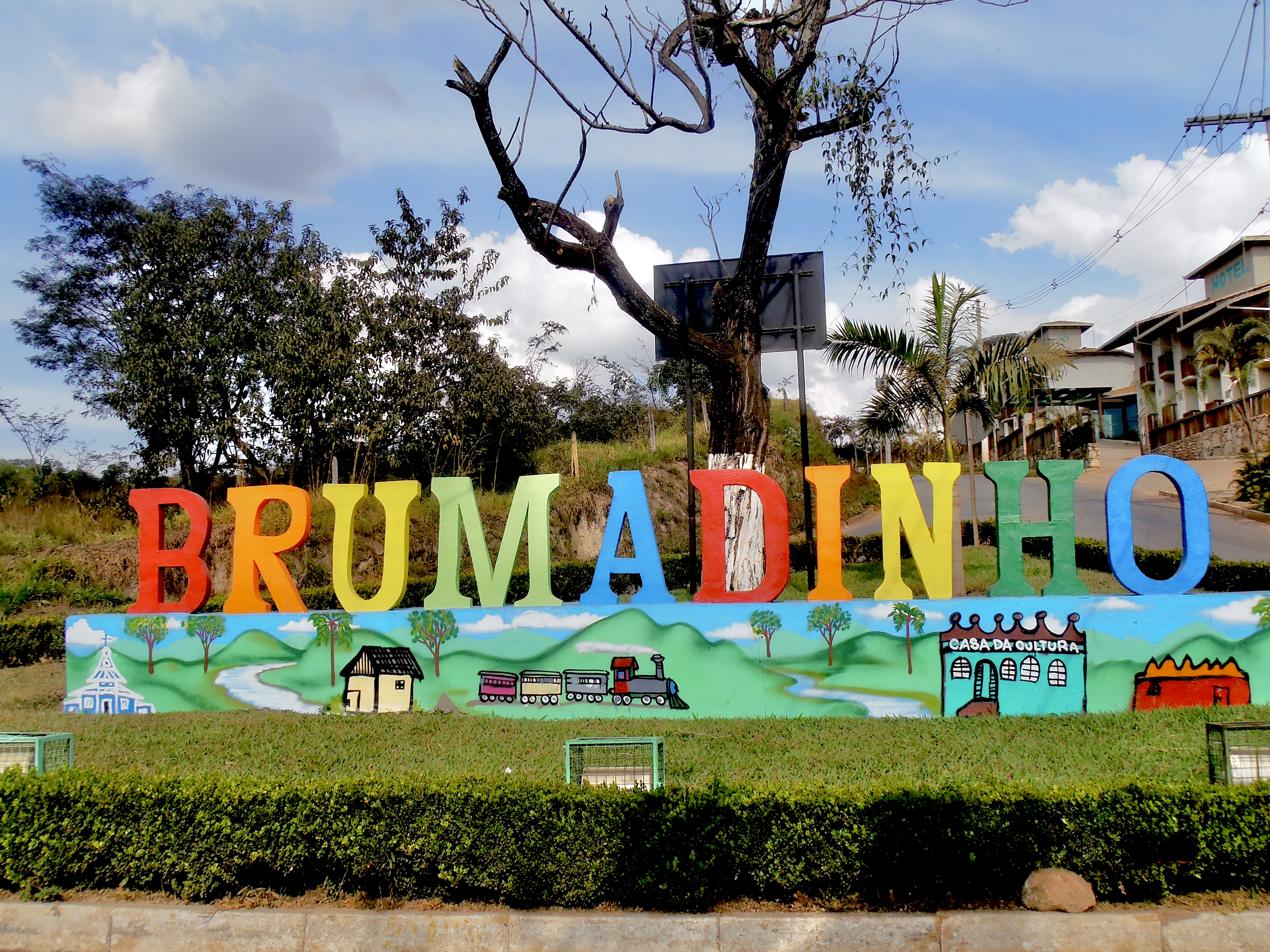

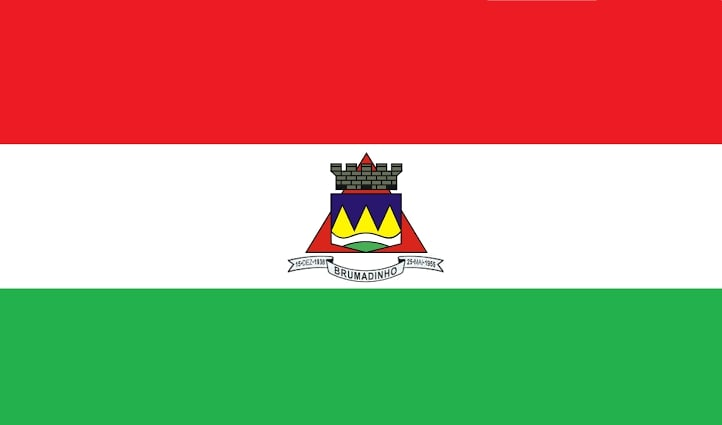
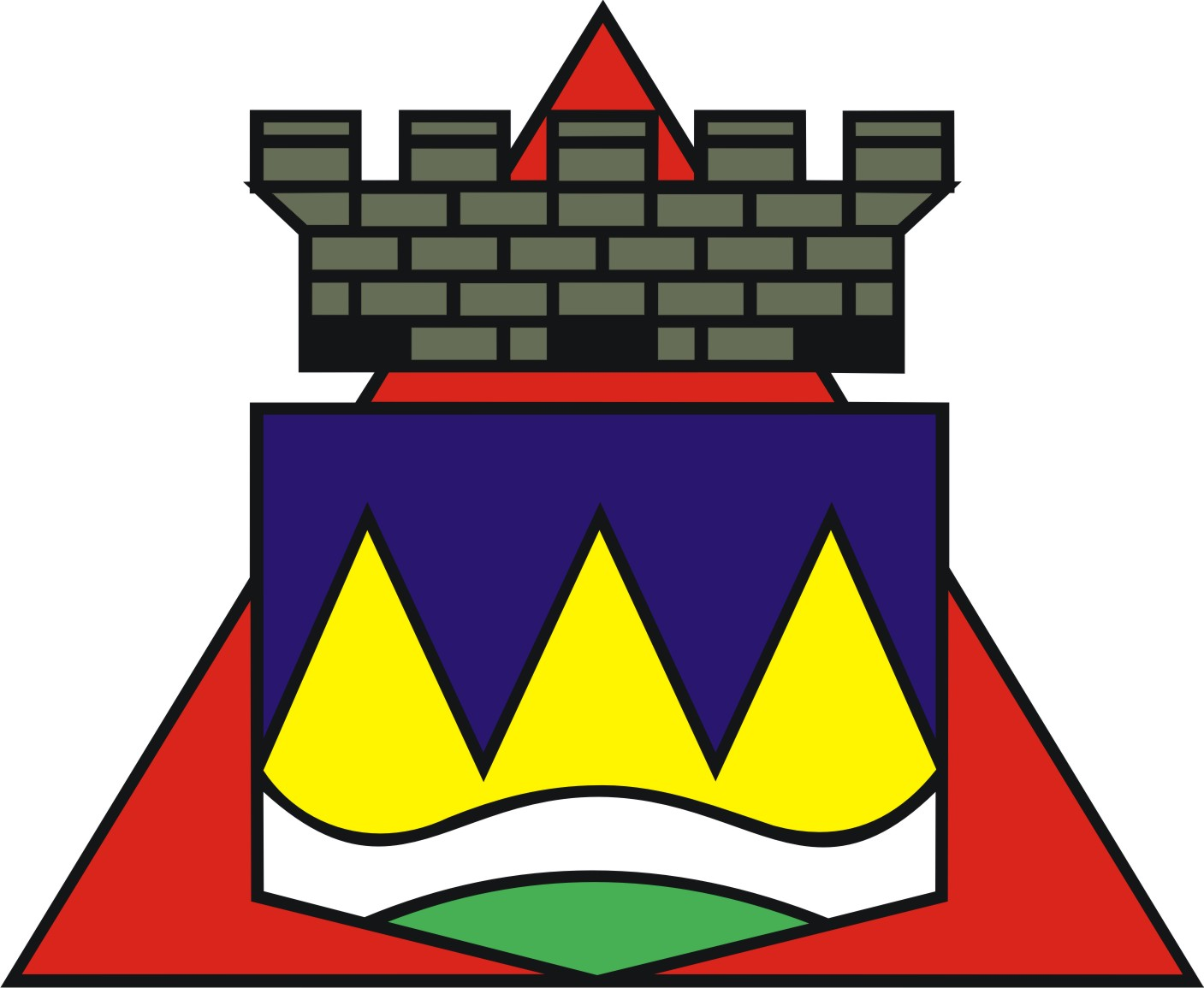
- Flag Coat of arms

- Location in Brazil
- Coordinates: 20°08′34″S 44°12′00″W
- Country: Brazil
- State: Minas Gerais
- Region: Southeast
- Intermediate Region: Belo Horizonte
- Immediate Region: Belo Horizonte
- Settled: 1689
- Incorporated: May 25, 1955

Government
  - Mayor: Antônio Brandão

Area
  - Total: 247,160 sq mi (640,150 km^{2})
- Elevation: 2,890 ft (880 m)

Population (2022 Census)
  - Total: 38,915
  - Estimate (2025): 41,090
- Time zone: UTC−3 (BRT)
- HDI (2010): 0.747 – high
- Website: www.brumadinho.mg.gov.br

Brumadinho (Brazilian Portuguese: [bɾumaˈdʒiɲu]) is a Brazilian municipality in the state of Minas Gerais. The city belongs to the Belo Horizonte metropolitan mesoregion and to the microregion of Belo Horizonte. Brumadinho is at an altitude of 880 m. In 2025 the population was 41,090. The municipality is on the Paraopeba River.

The Inhotim Museum of Contemporary Art, one of the most important art venues of Brazil, is in the city.

The municipality contains part of the 3,941 hectares (9,740 acres) Serra do Rola-Moça State Park, created in 1994.

== History ==
Brumadinho was settled in 1689. The Banda São Sebastião Musical Corporation, a symphonic band, was founded on May 13, 1929, by Tarcilio Gomes da Costa in Brumadinho. The municipality of Brumadinho itself was officially established on December 17, 1938.

On January 25, 2019, the city was the victim of a tailings dam collapse that killed 270 people. The disaster released a mudflow that advanced over houses in a rural area near the city.

== See also ==
- List of municipalities in Minas Gerais
- Brumadinho dam disaster
- Vale SA
