= Passabém =

Municipality of Brazil

Coordinates: 19°17′S 43°13′W

- Municipality
- Interactive map of Passabém
- Country: Brazil
- State: Minas Gerais
- Region: Southeast

Population (2022 Census)
  - Total: 1,600
  - Estimate (2025): 1,609
- Time zone: UTC−3 (BRT)

Location of Passabém within Minas Gerais

Passabém is a Brazilian municipality located in the state of Minas Gerais. The city belongs to the mesoregion Metropolitana de Belo Horizonte and to the microregion of Conceição do Mato Dentro. As of 2025, the estimated population was 1,609.

== See also ==
- List of municipalities in Minas Gerais
