= Ibirité =

- Municipality
- The Municipality of Ibirité
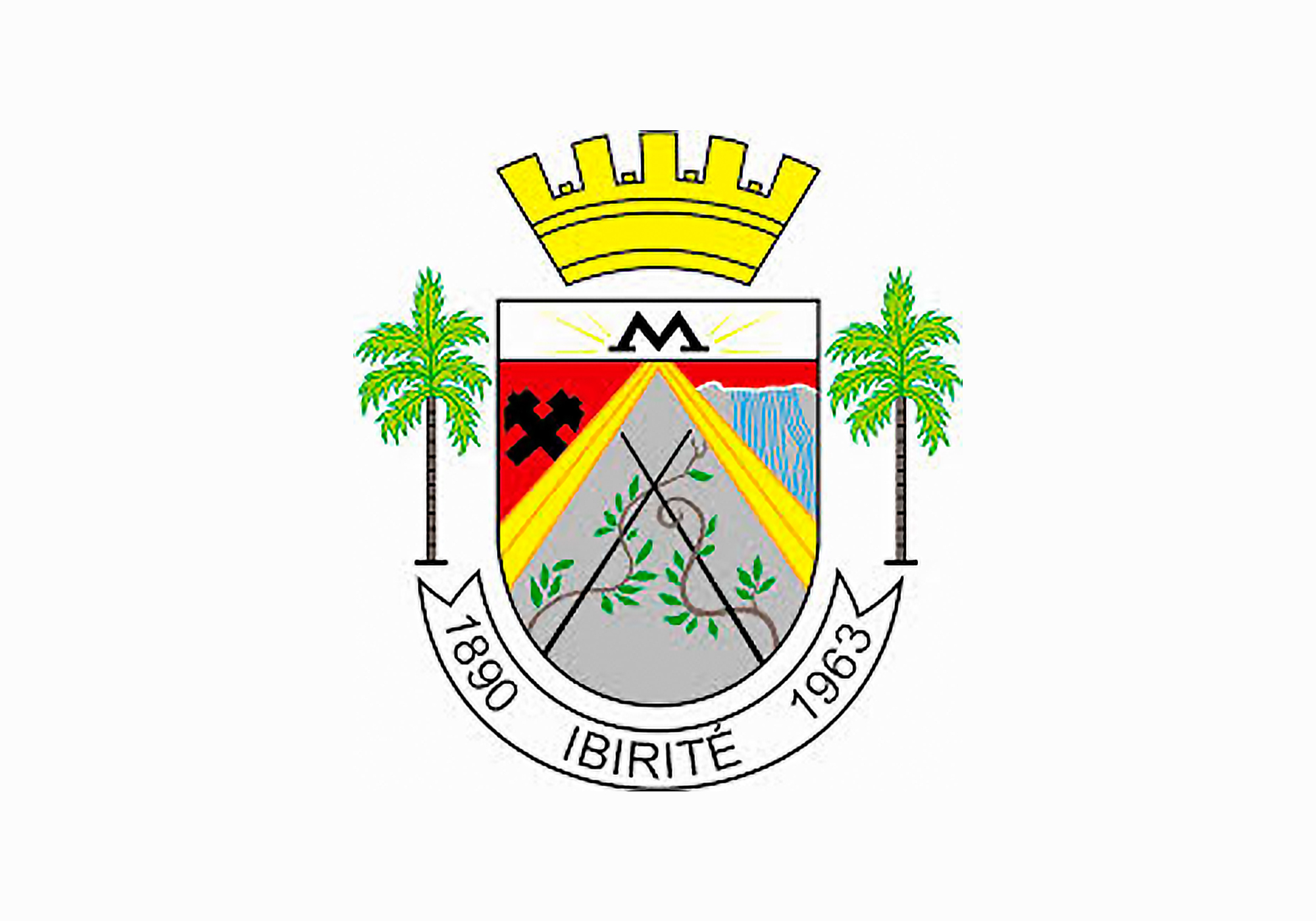
- Flag Coat of arms

- Location in Brazil
- Coordinates: 20°01′19″S 44°03′32″W
- Country: Brazil
- State: Minas Gerais
- City Established: March 1, 1963

Government
  - Mayor: William Parreira Duarte PTC

Area
  - Total: 73.027 km^{2} (28.196 sq mi)
- Elevation: 872 m (2,861 ft)

Population (2022 Brazilian Census)
  - Total: 170,537
  - Estimate (2025): 179,582
  - Density: 2,230.23/km^{2} (5,776.3/sq mi)
- Time zone: UTC−3 (BRT)
- Demonym: ibiriteense
- Website: http://www.ibirite.mg.gov.br/

Ibirité is a Brazilian municipality located in the state of Minas Gerais. The city belongs to the mesoregion Metropolitana de Belo Horizonte and to the microregion of Belo Horizonte. Its population in the 2022 Census was 170,537.

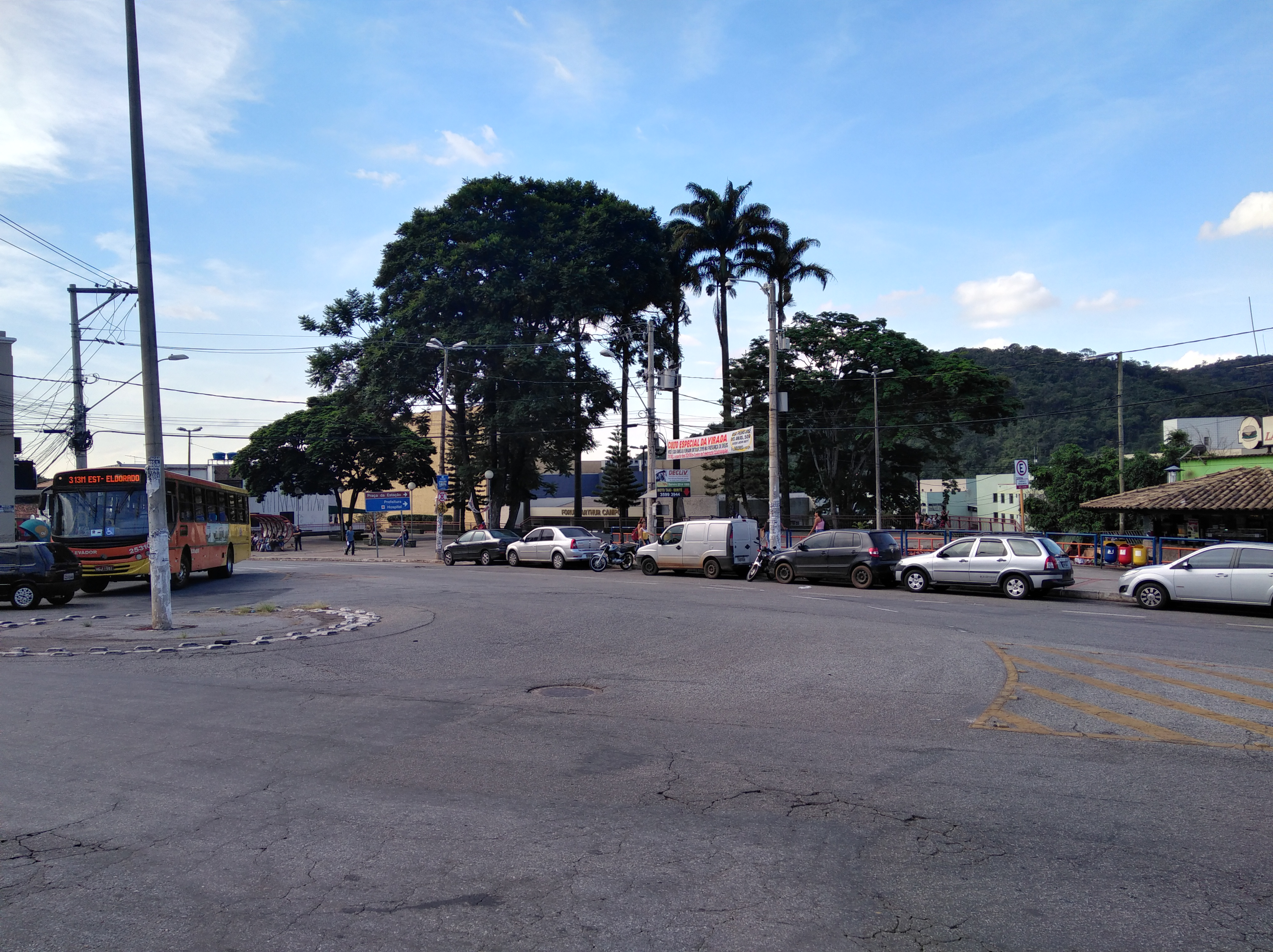
Ibirité downtown

== History ==
Ibirité was born in 1880 as a village with the name of Pantano de Vargas, in the parish of Sabará. This village was later chosen by Russian educator Helena Antipoff to be the seat of her works, that are still the major reference of the city. In 1890, became the condition of town, still belonging to Sabará. In 1897, became to belong to the municipality of Santa Quitéria, actually known as Esmeraldas. In 1911, the region becomes part of the municipality of Betim. In 1923, has changed its name to Ibiritê, indigenous word which means iron land. In 1938, become a district belonging to the municipality of Betim, already with the actual name. On December 30, 1962, is categorized as a municipality, with the districts Sede and Sarzedo. On March 1, 1963 Chaffir Ferreira is appointed by the governor of the state as municipal manager. In the first election for mayor, June 30, 1963, was elected Wanderlei José de Barros. In 1976, the district Durval de Barros was created and in 1985 the district of Mario Campos. In 1988, by the state law Nº 954888, Ibirité won the category of judicial district.

== Geography ==
Ibirité is located in the center of the state of Minas Gerais, at 20° 01' South and 44° 03' West. Is side by side with Belo Horizonte at Northeast, Betim at Northwest, Brumadinho at South, Contagem at North and Sarzedo at Southwest.

=== Weather ===
==== Weather stations ====
Ibirite contains two meteorological stations, which one is INMET, located in Helena Antipoff Foundation, and others nearby neighborhoods of Vista Alegre and Bosque. The first one is situated at 814 meters over the sea level and has a mild climate thanks to the dense vegetation of this part of town. These are the data of the station:

City: Ibirité
State: Minas Gerais
Localization: 20.02° South 44.05° West
Height: 816 meters
Source: Normais Climatológicas.

==== Average temperature, month by month ====
Jan	Feb	Mar	Apr	May	Jun	Jul	Aug	Sep	Oct	Nov	Dec	Dec
22.6 °C	22.9 °C	22.5 °C	22.4 °C	18 °C	16.9 °C	16.5 °C	18.4 °C	20.5 °C	21.5 °C	22 °C	22.1 °C	20.5 °C

=== Climate ===
Climate data for Ibirité (1981–2010)
Month	Jan	Feb	Mar	Apr	May	Jun	Jul	Aug	Sep	Oct	Nov	Dec	Year
Mean daily maximum °C (°F)	29.7 (85.5)	30.4 (86.7)	30.0 (86.0)	29.0 (84.2)	27.2 (81.0)	26.1 (79.0)	26.3 (79.3)	27.7 (81.9)	28.7 (83.7)	29.9 (85.8)	29.6 (85.3)	29.2 (84.6)	28.7 (83.7)
Daily mean °C (°F)	23.0 (73.4)	23.2 (73.8)	22.9 (73.2)	21.6 (70.9)	19.2 (66.6)	17.7 (63.9)	17.4 (63.3)	19.0 (66.2)	21.1 (70.0)	22.5 (72.5)	22.8 (73.0)	22.7 (72.9)	21.1 (70.0)
Mean daily minimum °C (°F)	18.1 (64.6)	17.6 (63.7)	17.6 (63.7)	15.5 (59.9)	12.7 (54.9)	10.1 (50.2)	9.7 (49.5)	11.4 (52.5)	14.4 (57.9)	16.1 (61.0)	17.1 (62.8)	17.9 (64.2)	14.9 (58.8)
Average precipitation mm (inches)	286.0 (11.26)	165.4 (6.51)	175.3 (6.90)	67.6 (2.66)	29.9 (1.18)	11.7 (0.46)	5.7 (0.22)	13.2 (0.52)	53.3 (2.10)	121.5 (4.78)	205.3 (8.08)	349.9 (13.78)	1,484.8 (58.46)
Average precipitation days (≥ 1.0 mm)	17	11	12	6	3	2	1	2	4	7	14	18	97
Average relative humidity (%)	80.6	77.6	77.6	77.1	77.8	76.5	72.8	68.0	68.2	69.3	75.6	80.4	75.1
Source: Instituto Nacional de Meteorologia

== Education ==
=== Elementary ===
According to the 2004 educational census, conducted by the National Institute of Educational Studies and Research, Ibirité has 35 schools of basic education, 15 local, 15 of the state and 5 private.

=== High school ===
The district has 10 high schools, all of them of the state.

=== Higher education ===
There are four top-level schools in the city of Ibirité: the State University of Minas Gerais, UNOPAR, UNINCOR and EADCOM.

== Economy ==
Its main economic activities are the planting of crops and mining. The economy of Ibirité is not significant when compared to its population. There are even some who call the place of "dormitory city." Most residents of Ibirité work in neighboring cities, especially Belo Horizonte, Contagem and Betim.

=== Agriculture ===
According to IBGE, the greatest productions are: banana (30 tonnes in 2003), sugar cane (133 tonnes in 2003), onion (610 tonnes in 2003), beans (15 tons in 2003), cassava (70 tonnes in 2003), maize (240 tons in 2003), tomatoes (3691 tonnes in 2003).

=== Trade ===
Most shops are located in the city center. Trade is a very limited activity in the city. The local population depends on Belo Horizonte and Contagem.

=== Industry ===
In the 1990s, it was installed in an industrial district, which houses companies from various branches. There are some industries that operate outside this district. The main sectors of production are: manufacture of articles for clothing, extraction of minerals, manufacture of parts for motor vehicles, manufacture of rubber and plastics, manufacture of machinery and equipment, manufacture of furniture, manufacture of food products and beverages, manufacturing of wood products, manufacture of textile products, manufacture of electrical machinery apparatus and equipment, manufacture of metal products.

=== Ibiritermo ===
A point of emphasis for industry of Ibirité is the Ibiritermo, thermoelectric plants powered by gas, inaugurated in 2002.

=== Petrobras ===
More than a half of the area occupied by Gabriel Passos refinery, from Petrobras, is in Ibiriteense territory.

=== Livestock ===
This sector represents little to the council. According to the IBGE, in 2003 Ibirité had only 1,225 head of cattle, 78 head of horses, 9 head of buffalo and 295 head of cows milked.

=== Leisure ===
The municipality contains part of the 3,941 hectares (9,740 acres) Serra do Rola-Moça State Park, created in 1994. In Ibirité there are Polisportives and recreational areas. There are also several waterfalls, which are about 20 km from the city center in Casa Branca.

== See also ==
- List of municipalities in Minas Gerais
