= Santana do Riacho =

- Municipality
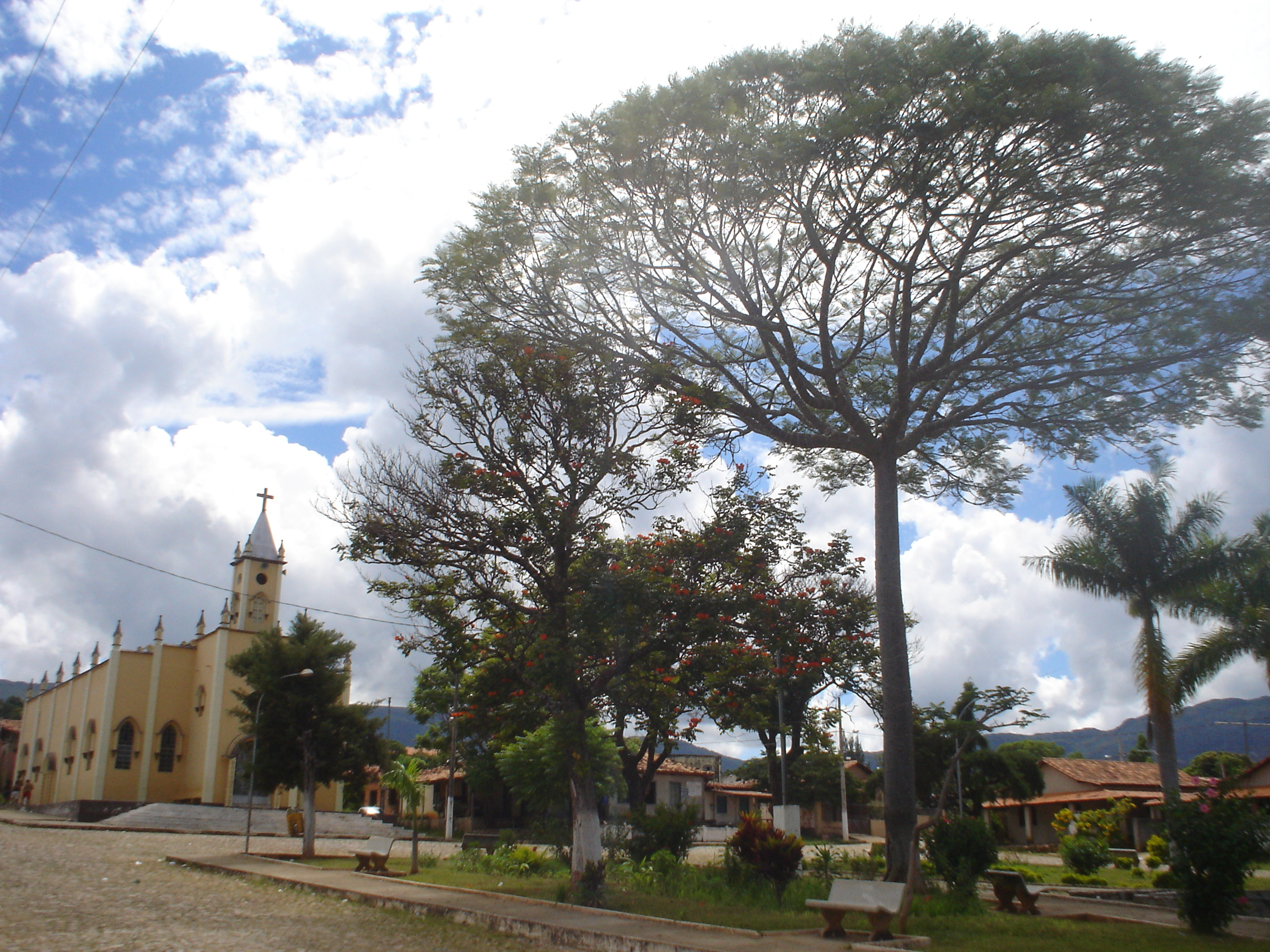
- Saint Anne Matriz Church

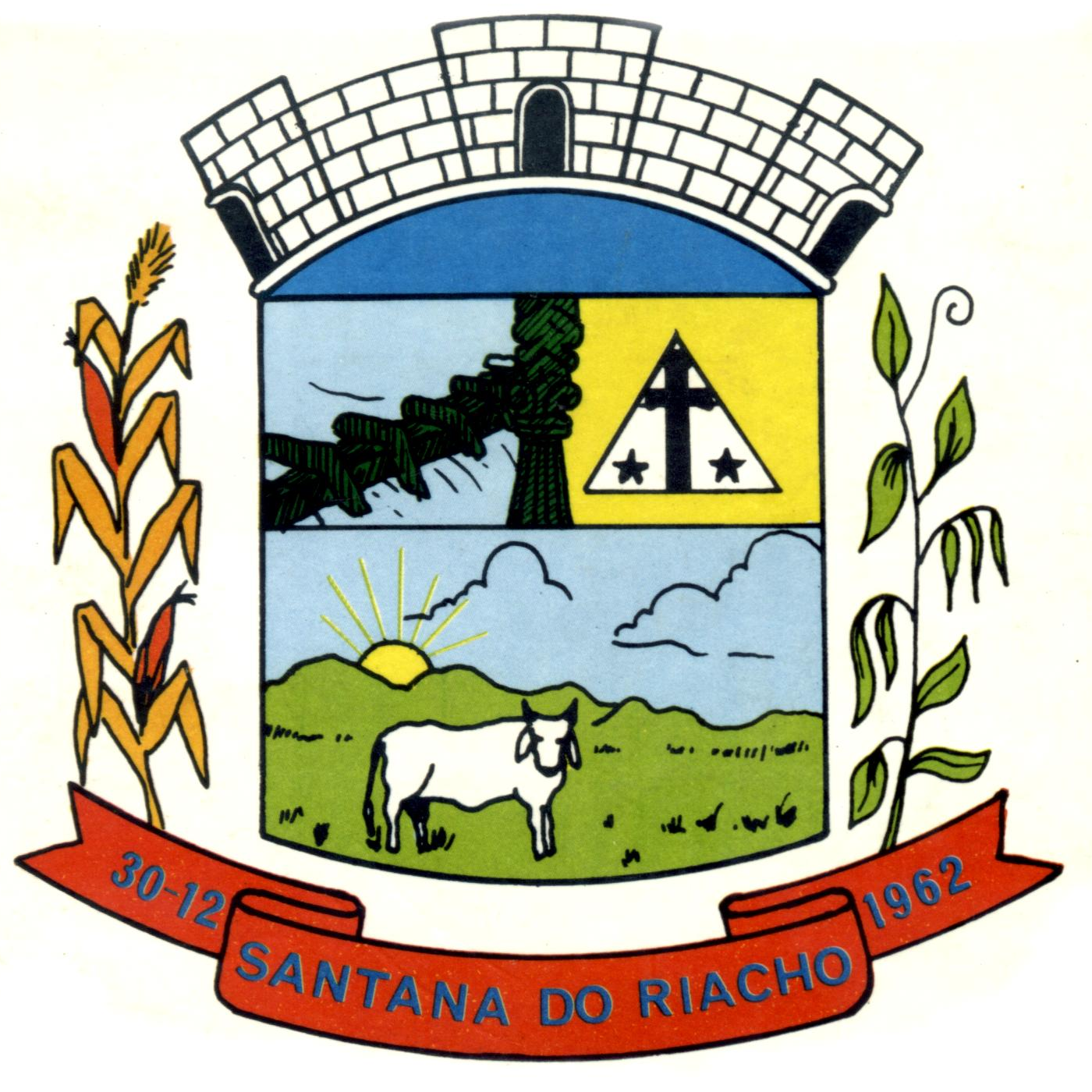
- Coat of arms

- Localization of Santana do Riacho
- Coordinates: 19°10′8″S 43°42′50″W
- Country: Brazil
- Region: Southeast
- State: Minas Gerais
- Mesoregion: Metropolitana de Belo Horizonte

Population (2022 Census)
  - Total: 5,313
  - Estimate (2025): 5,654
- Time zone: UTC−3 (BRT)

Santana do Riacho is a municipality in the state of Minas Gerais in the Southeast region of Brazil.

== See also ==
- List of municipalities in Minas Gerais
