= Santa Maria de Itabira =

Human settlement in Brazil

Coordinates: 19°26′56″S 43°6′46″W

- Municipality
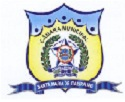
- Coat of arms
- Interactive map of Santa Maria de Itabira
- Country: Brazil
- State: Minas Gerais
- Region: Southeast

Population (2022 Census)
  - Total: 10,485
  - Estimate (2025): 10,718
- Time zone: UTC−3 (BRT)

Location of Santa Maria de Itabira within Minas Gerais

Santa Maria de Itabira is a Brazilian municipality located in the state of Minas Gerais. The city belongs to the mesoregion Metropolitana de Belo Horizonte and to the microregion of Itabira. As of 2025, the estimated population was 10,718.

== See also ==
- List of municipalities in Minas Gerais
