= Morro do Pilar =

Human settlement in Brazil

Coordinates: 19°12′S 43°23′W

- Municipality
- Interactive map of Morro do Pilar
- Country: Brazil
- State: Minas Gerais
- Region: Southeast

Population (2022 Census)
  - Total: 3,133
  - Estimate (2025): 3,161
- Time zone: UTC−3 (BRT)

Location of Morro do Pilar within Minas Gerais

Morro do Pilar is a Brazilian municipality located in the state of Minas Gerais. The city belongs to the mesoregion Metropolitana de Belo Horizonte and to the microregion of Conceição do Mato Dentro. As of 2025, the estimated population was 3,161.

== See also ==
- List of municipalities in Minas Gerais
