= Intermediate Geographic Region of Belo Horizonte =

Interurban administrative region in Minas Gerais, Brazil

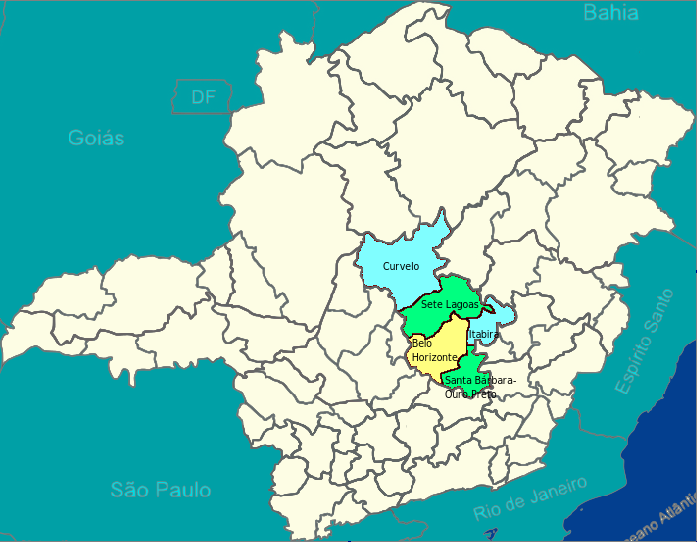
Intermediate Geographic Region of Belo Horizonte, in the state of Minas Gerais, Brazil.

The Intermediate Geographic Region of Belo Horizonte (code 3101) is one of the 13 intermediate geographic regions in the Brazilian state of Minas Gerais and one of the 134 of Brazil, created by the National Institute of Geography and Statistics (IBGE) in 2017.

It comprises 74 municipalities, distributed in 5 immediate geographic regions:

- Immediate Geographic Region of Belo Horizonte.
- Immediate Geographic Region of Sete Lagoas.
- Immediate Geographic Region of Santa Bárbara-Ouro Preto.
- Immediate Geographic Region of Curvelo.
- Immediate Geographic Region of Itabira.

== See also ==
- List of Intermediate and Immediate Geographic Regions of Minas Gerais
