= Nova União, Minas Gerais =

Municipality of Minas Gerais, Brazil

Coordinates: 19°41′24″S 43°34′48″W

- Municipality
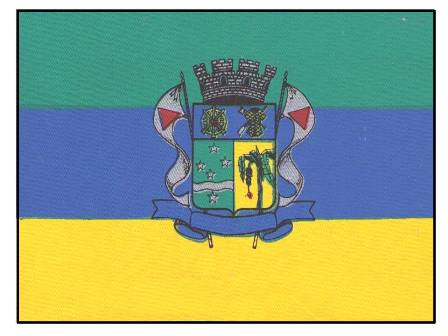
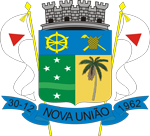
- Flag Coat of arms
- Interactive map of Nova União, Minas Gerais
- Country: Brazil
- State: Minas Gerais
- Region: Southeast

Population (2022 Census)
  - Total: 5,909
  - Estimate (2025): 6,107
- Time zone: UTC−3 (BRT)

Location of Nova União within Minas Gerais

Nova União is a municipality located in the Brazilian state of Minas Gerais. The city belongs to the mesoregion Metropolitana de Belo Horizonte and to the microregion of Itabira. As of 2025, the estimated population was 6,107.

== See also ==
- List of municipalities in Minas Gerais
