= Ângelo Domingos Salvador =

Roman Catholic prelate (1932–2022)

His Excellency Ângelo Domingos Salvador OFMCap
- Bishop Emeritus of Uruguaiana
- Archdiocese: Roman Catholic Archdiocese of Santa Maria
- Diocese: Uruguaiana
- Appointed: 26 May 1999
- Term ended: 27 June 2007
- Predecessor: Pedro Ercílio Simon
- Successor: Aloísio Alberto Dilli
- Previous posts: Auxiliary Bishop of São Salvador da Bahia (1981–1986); Titular Bishop of Selia (1981–1986); Prelate of Coxim (1986–1991); Bishop of Cachoeira do Sul (1991–1999)

Personal details
- Born: 17 July 1932 Vacaria, Rio Grande do Sul, Brazil
- Died: 13 August 2022 (aged 90) Caxias do Sul, Rio Grande do Sul, Brazil

Ângelo Domingos Salvador OFMCap (17 July 1932 – 13 August 2022) was a Brazilian Roman Catholic prelate.

Salvador was born in Brazil and was ordained to the priesthood in 1958. He served as the titular bishop of Selia and as auxiliary bishop of the Roman Catholic Archdiocese of São Salvador da Bahia from 1981 to 1986. Salvador served as the bishop of the Roman Catholic Diocese of Coxim from 1986 to 1991, then served as bishop of the Roman Catholic Diocese of Cachoeira do Sul from 1991 to 1999 and then served as bishop of the Roman Catholic Diocese of Uruguaiana from 1999 until his retirement in 2007.

Catholic Church titles
Preceded by Pedro Ercílio Simon	Bishop of Uruguaiana; 1999–2007	Succeeded by Aloísio Alberto Dilli
Preceded by Post created	Bishop of Cachoeira do Sul; 1991–1999	Succeeded by Irineu Silvio Wilges
Preceded by Clóvis Frainer	Prelate of Coxim; 1986–1991	Succeeded by Osório Claudio Bebber
Preceded by Salvador Lazo Lazo	Titular Bishop of Selia; 1981–1986	Succeeded by Eurico dos Santos Veloso
Preceded by —	Auxiliary Bishop of São Salvador da Bahia; 1981–1986	Succeeded by —
