= Walmor Oliveira de Azevedo =

Catholic bishop

The Most Reverend Walmor Oliveira de Azevedo
- Archbishop of Belo Horizonte
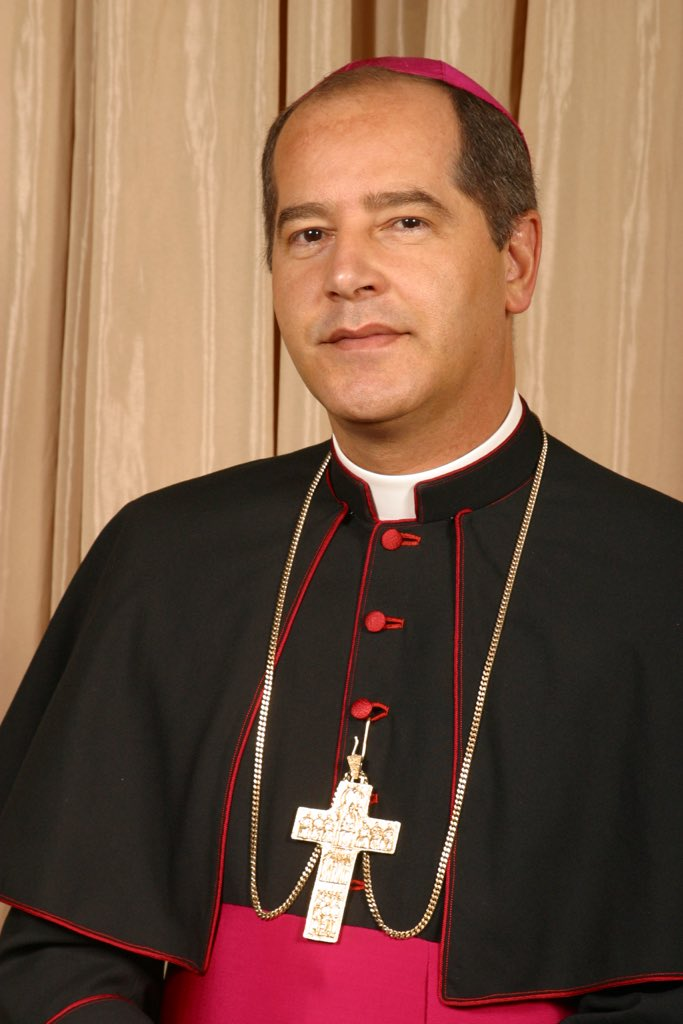
- Church: Roman Catholic Church
- Archdiocese: Belo Horizonte
- See: Belo Horizonte
- Appointed: 28 January 2004
- Installed: 26 March 2004
- Predecessor: Serafim Fernandes de Araújo
- Other posts: Ordinary of Brazil of the Eastern Rite (2010-); President of the Brazilian Episcopal Conference (2019–2023)
- Previous posts: Titular Bishop of Caliábria (1998-2004); Auxiliary Bishop of São Salvador da Bahia (1998-2004)

Orders
- Ordination: 9 September 1977
- Consecration: 10 May 1998 by Lucas Moreira Neves

Personal details
- Born: Walmor Oliveira de Azevedo; 26 April 1954 (age 72) Cocos, Bahia, Brazil
- Education: Pontifical Biblical Institute; Pontifical Gregorian University
- Motto: Ut mederer contritis corde

Walmor Oliveira de Azevedo (born 26 April 1954) is a prelate of the Roman Catholic Church. He served as auxiliary bishop of São Salvador da Bahia from 1998 till 2004, when he became archbishop of Belo Horizonte. In 2010 he also became bishop for the Brazilian ordinariate for the faithful of eastern rite. In May 2019, he became head of the Brazilian Bishops conference and led the bishop conference during the period 2019–2023.

== Biography ==
Born in Cocos, Oliveira de Azevedo was ordained to the priesthood on 9 September 1977, serving in Juiz de Fora.

On 21 January 1998, he was appointed auxiliary bishop of São Salvador da Bahia and titular bishop of Caliabria. Oliveira de Azevedo received his episcopal consecration on the following 10 May from Lucas Cardinal Moreira Neves, archbishop of São Salvador da Bahia, with the archbishop of Juiz de Fora, Clóvis Frainer, and the bishop of Luz, Eurico dos Santos Veloso, serving as co-consecrators.

On 28 January 2004, he was appointed Archbishop of Belo Horizonte. He was installed on the following 26 March. Pope Benedict XVI named him a member of the Congregation for the Doctrine of the Faith on 22 September 2009. On 28 July 2010 he also became bishop for the Brazilian ordinariate for the faithful of eastern rite.

Pope Francis named him a member of the Congregation for the Oriental Churches on 19 February 2014.

On 6 May 2019 he was elected president of the Episcopal Conference of Brazil.

He has held these positions in the Conference:

- 1999-2003 Member of the commission for the Doctrine of the Faith
- Since 2003 Chairman of the commission for the Doctrine of the Faith
- 2007 Representative for the fifth general conference of the Latin American Episcopal Conference in Aparecida
- Chairman of region Leste 2 of the Brazilian Bishops conference
- 2019–2023 Chairman of the Brazilian Bishops conference

== Principal consecrator ==
He was principal consecrator of the following bishops:

- Aloísio Jorge Pena Vitral
- Joaquim Giovanni Mol Guimarães
- Luis Gonzaga Féchio
- Wilson Luís Angotti Filho
- João Justino de Medeiros Silva

He was principal co-consecrator of the following bishops:

- Eduardo Benes de Sales Rodrigues
- José Francisco Rezende Dias
- Dominique Marie Jean Denis You
- João Carlos Petrini
- Josafá Menezes da Silva

== Honors ==
- 14 May 2009 honorary citizen of the state of Minas Gerais
- 7 March 2010 honorary citizen of the city of Ribeirão das Neves
- 21 March 2010 honorary diploma of the city of Belo Horizonte
- 16 December 2010 honorary citizen of the city of Caeté
