= Diocese of Divinópolis =

Catholic ecclesiastical territory

Coordinates: 20.1390°S 44.8840°W

Diocese of Divinópolis Dioecesis Divinopolitanus Diocese de Divinópolis
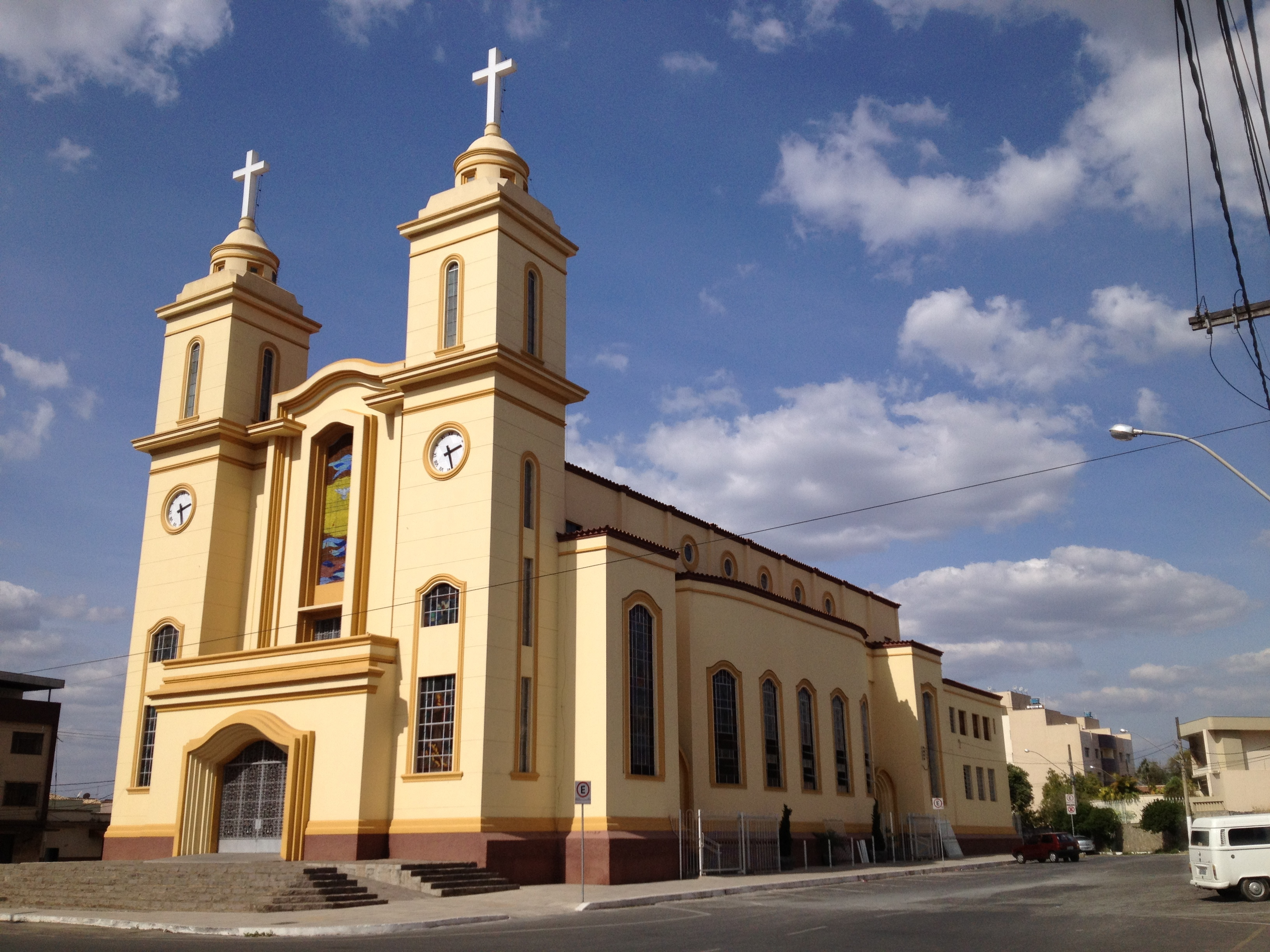

Location
- Country: Brazil
- Ecclesiastical province: Belo Horizonte
- Metropolitan: Belo Horizonte

Statistics
- Area: 8,824 km^{2} (3,407 sq mi)
- Population: Total; Catholics: (as of 2006); 712,636; 612,390 (85.9%)

Information
- Denomination: Catholic Church
- Rite: Latin Rite
- Established: 11 July 1958 (67 years ago)
- Cathedral: Cathedral of the Holy Spirit in Divinópolis

Current leadership
- Pope: Leo XIV
- Bishop: Geovane Luís da Silva
- Metropolitan Archbishop: Walmor Oliveira de Azevedo

Website
- www.diocesedivinopolis.org.br

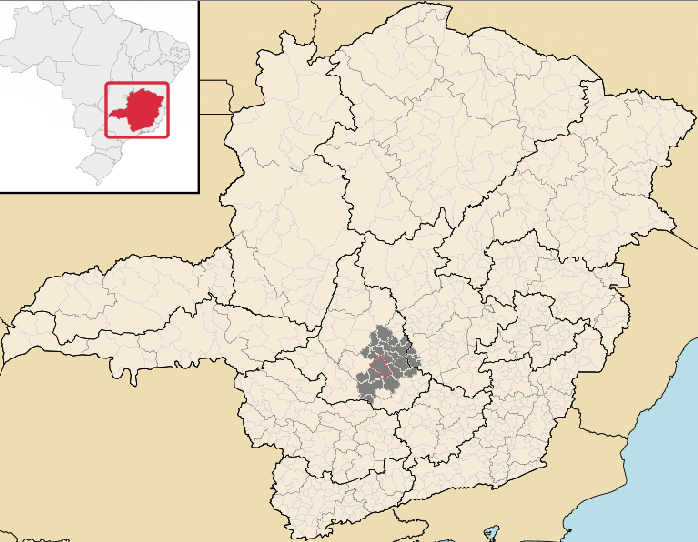
Roman Catholic Diocese of Divinópolis.

The Roman Catholic Diocese of Divinópolis (Latin: Dioecesis Divinopolitanus) is a diocese located in the city of Divinópolis in the ecclesiastical province of Belo Horizonte in Brazil.

== History ==
- July 11, 1958: Established as Diocese of Divinópolis from the Diocese of Aterrado and Metropolitan Archdiocese of Belo Horizonte

== Bishops ==
- Bishops of Divinópolis (Roman rite), listed in reverse chronological order)
  - Bishop Geovane Luís da Silva (2023.04.19 – Present)
  - Bishop José Carlos de Souza Campos (2014.02.26 – 2022.12.14), appointed Archbishop of Montes Claros
  - Bishop Tarcísio Nascentes dos Santos (2009.02.11 – 2012.08.01), appointed Bishop of Duque de Caxias, Rio de Janeiro
  - Bishop José Belvino do Nascimento (1989.02.27 – 2009.02.11)
  - Bishop José Costa Campos (1979.03.26 – 1989.02.27)
  - Bishop Cristiano Portela de Araújo Pena (1959.02.19 – 1979.03.26)

=== Other priests of this diocese who became bishops ===
- Gil Antônio Moreira, appointed Auxiliary Bishop of São Paulo in 1999
- Moacir Silva Arantes, appointed Auxiliary Bishop of Goiânia, Goias in 2016
- Francisco Cota de Oliveira, appointed Auxiliary Bishop of Curitiba, Parana in 2017

== Sources ==
- GCatholic.org
- Catholic Hierarchy
- Diocese website
