= Diocese of Coxim =

Latin Catholic jurisdiction in Brazil

Coordinates: 18.5061°S 54.7606°W

Diocese of Coxim Dioecesis Coxinensis Diocese de Coxim

Location
- Country: Brazil
- Ecclesiastical province: Campo Grande

Statistics
- Area: 45,000 km^{2} (17,000 sq mi)
- Population: Total; Catholics: (as of 2006); 131,500; 92,000 (70.0%)

Information
- Denomination: Catholic Church
- Sui iuris church: Latin Church
- Rite: Roman Rite
- Established: 3 January 1978 (48 years ago)
- Cathedral: Catedral São José

Current leadership
- Pope: Leo XIV
- Bishop: Otair Nicoletti
- Metropolitan Archbishop: Dimas Lara Barbosa
- Bishops emeritus: Antonino Migliore

Website
- Website of the Diocese

The Diocese of Coxim (Latin: Dioecesis Coxinensis) is a Latin Church ecclesiastical territory or diocese of the Catholic Church in Mato Grosso do Sul state, southwestern inland Brazil. It is a suffragan in the ecclesiastical province of the metropolitan Archdiocese of Campo Grande.

Its cathedral episcopal see is Catedral São José, dedicated to Saint Joseph, in the city of Coxim.

== History ==
- Established on January 3, 1978 as Territorial Prelature of Coxim, on territory split off from the then Diocese of Campo Grande (now its metropolitan see)
- November 13, 2002: Promoted as Diocese of Coxim

== Statistics and extent ==
As of 2014, it pastorally served 110,000 Catholics (78.0% of 141,000 total) on 45,000 km^{2} (the municipalities Coxim, Alcinópolis, Camapuã, Costa Rica, Figueirão, Pedro Gomes, Rio Negro, Rio Verde de Mato Grosso, São Gabriel do Oeste and Sonora) in 14 parishes with 17 priests (15 diocesan, 2 religious), 1 deacon, 22 lay religious (4 brothers, 18 sisters) and 8 seminarians.

== Episcopal ordinaries ==
Territorial Prelates of Coxim

- Clóvis Frainer, OFMCap (1978.01.03 – 1985.01.05), next Metropolitan Archbishop of Manaus (Brazil) (1985.01.05 – 1991.05.22), Metropolitan Archbishop of Juiz de Fora (Brazil) (1991.05.22 – retired 2001.11.28); died 2017
- Ângelo Domingos Salvador, OFMCap (1986.05.16 – 1991.07.17), previously Titular Bishop of Selia (1981.03.16 – 1986.05.16) as Auxiliary Bishop of Archdiocese of São Salvador da Bahia (Brazil) (1981.03.16 – 1986.05.16); later Bishop of Cachoeira do Sul (Brazil) (1991.07.17 – 1999.05.26), Bishop of Uruguaiana (Brazil) (1999.05.26 – retired 2007.06.27)
- Osório Bebber, OFMCap (1992.01.18 – 1999.03.17), previously Coadjutor Bishop of Tubarão (Brazil) (1979.11.30 – 1981.09.17), succeeding as Bishop of Tubarão (1981.09.17 – 1992.01.18); later Bishop of Joaçaba (Brazil) (1999.03.17 – retired 2003.04.09)
- Antonino Migliore (born Italy) (2000.05.10 – 2002.11.13 see below), no previous prelature

Suffragan Bishops of Coxim

- Antonino Migliore (see above 2002.11.13 – 2022.10.19).
- Otair Nicoletti (2022.10.19 – ...).

== Sources and external links ==
- GCatholic.org - data for all sections
- Catholic Hierarchy
- Diocese website (Portuguese)
