= Irineu Sílvio Wilges =

Brazilian Roman Catholic prelate (1936–2022)

His Excellency Irineu Sílvio Wilges
- Bishop Emertus of Cachoeira do Sul
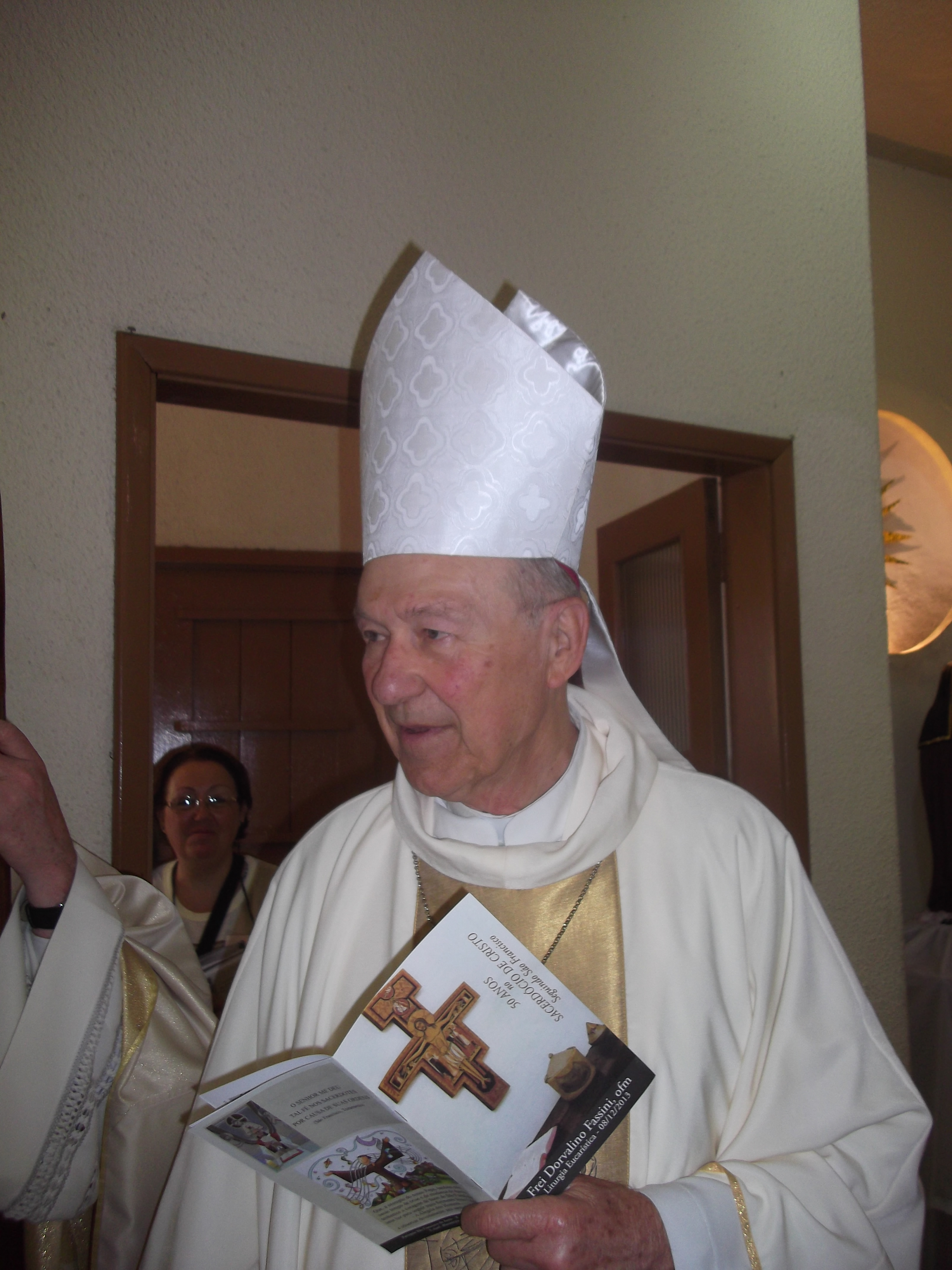
- Archdiocese: Santa Maria
- Appointed: 14 June 2000
- Term ended: 28 December 2011
- Predecessor: Ângelo Domingos Salvador
- Successor: Remídio José Bohn

Orders
- Ordination: 15 July 1962 by Cristiano Frederico Portela de Araújo Pena
- Consecration: 12 August 2000 by Aloísio Leo Arlindo Lorscheider

Personal details
- Born: 3 October 1936 Pinheiral, Rio de Janeiro, Brazil
- Died: 17 November 2022 (aged 86) Porto Alegre, Rio Grande do Sul, Brazil

Irineu Sílvio Wilges (3 October 1936 – 17 November 2022) was a Brazilian Roman Catholic prelate.

Wilges was born in Pinheiral and was ordained to the priesthood in 1962. On 14 June 2000, Pope John Paul II appointed him as the bishop of the Roman Catholic Diocese of Cachoeira do Sul, Brazil. He was consecrated on 12 August 2000 by cardinal Aloísio Lorscheider and served as the bishop until his retirement in 2011.

Catholic Church titles
Preceded by Ângelo Domingos Salvador	Bishop of Cachoeira do Sul; 2000–2011	Succeeded by Remídio José Bohn
