= Caliábria =

Former city & Catholic diocese in Portugal

Caliabria was a city and the seat of a diocese founded in the 7th century in Visigothic Spain and is now a Latin titular see of the Catholic Church.

== Location ==
Although Enrique Flórez wrote in 1755 that the location of what had been the town that gave its name to the see was then unknown, scholars generally accept the statements made by several sources, some of them earlier than Flórez, that the site of Caliabria was on a high hill by the river Douro, near Almendra, Vila Nova de Foz Côa, Portugal. The ruins are now officially signposted as "Ruínas de Calábria".

However, Coura, near Viseu, and Fermoselle near Zamora each have a champion, as do Vilanova de Foz Côa and Castelho Melhor, places closer to the generally accepted location.

== Ecclesiastical History ==
=== Foundation ===
The bishopric of Caliabria, documented only since the 7th century, was probably a Visigothic foundation. Before becoming a diocese, Caliabria was a mere parish of the Diocese of Viseu, which was then part of the kingdom of the Suebi or Suevi of Gallæcia. It is mentioned as such in a document of the time of that kingdom drawn up between 572 and 589, to which was later added the annotation "quae apud Gotos postea sedes fuit" (which later, under the Goths, who annexed the kingdom in 585, was a diocese). The exact date of its erection as a diocese under the Visigoths is disputed, one scholar placing it after 621, while another thinks it occurred in the reign of Witteric (603-610), or it may be as early as 569, under the Suebi. Historians found no evidence for the recent theory that Augustóbriga, i.e. Ancient Ciudad Rodrigo, already was a Roman diocese which the invading Visigoths transferred to Caliabria. It was a suffragan see of the Archdiocese of Mérida (in Estremadura, Spain), Metropolitan capital of the Roman province Lusitania.

=== Early bishops ===
The names of four Bishops of Caliabria are recorded among the participants in councils held at Toledo and Mérida between 633 and 693:

1. Servus Dei (633-646)
2. Celedonius (653-660?)
3. Aloarius (666-670?)
4. Ervígius (688-693)
5. ...

=== Extinction and replacement ===
Nothing more is known about it until the 8th century Muslim conquest of the Iberian peninsula put an end to the existence of the Diocese of Caliabria, which was however already suppressed in 693. The city was completely ravaged by the Arab invaders, even its very location remains disputed.

In 1161, King Ferdinand II of León founded the Diocese of Ciudad Rodrigo, while granting the defunct city's territory to that city, perhaps claiming, because of opposition raised by the civil and ecclesiastical authorities of Salamanca, that the new diocese was a revival of that of Caliabria, a title generally used by the first bishop, but not by his successors, by whose time agreement had been reached with Salamanca. However the papal bulla Ex litteris, by which Pope Alexander III confirmed in 1175 the erection of the diocese of di Ciudad Rodrigo, mentions neither Caliabria nor a restoration.

== Titular see ==
The diocese of Caliabria was nominally restored in 1969 as Latin Titular bishopric of Caliábria (Portuguese) / Caliabria (Curiate Italian) / Calabriensis (Latin adjective).

It has had the following incumbents, so far of the fitting Episcopal (lowest) rank :

- Albert van Overbeke, Scheutists (C.I.C.M.) (1969.09.10 – 1978.02.18) as only Bishop-Prelate of Territorial Prelature of Bayombong (Philippines) (1966.11.18 – 1982.11.15), later promoted first Bishop of Diocese of Bayombong (Philippines) (1982.11.15 – retired 1986.09.15); died 1787
- José da Cruz Policarpo (1978.05.26 – 1997.03.05) as Auxiliary Bishop of Patriarchate of Lisboa (Lisbon, Portugal) (1978.05.26 – 1997.03.05), Vice-President of Council of European Bishops’ Conferences (1986 – 1990), next Coadjutor Archbishop of Lisboa (Portugal) (1997.03.05 – 1998.03.24), succeeding as Patriarch of Lisbon (1998.03.24 – retired 2013.05.18), President of Episcopal Conference of Portugal (1999 – 2005), created Cardinal-Priest of S. Antonio in Campo Marzio (2001.02.21 [2001.05.27] – death 2014.03.12), President of Episcopal Conference of Portugal (2011.05.03 – 2013.05.18)
- Walmor Oliveira de Azevedo (1998.01.21 – 2004.01.28) as Auxiliary Bishop of São Salvador da Bahia (Brazil) (1998.01.21 – 2004.01.28), later Metropolitan Archbishop of Belo Horizonte (Brazil) (2004.01.28 – ...), also Ordinary of Brazil of the Eastern Rite (Brazil) (2010.07.28 – ...)
- Paulo Francisco Machado (2004.05.12 – 2008.01.02) as Auxiliary Bishop of Juiz de Fora (Brazil) (2004.05.12 – 2008.01.02), next Bishop of Uberlândia (Brazil) (2008.01.02 – ...)
- Joaquim Augusto da Silva Mendes, Salesians of Don Bosco (S.D.B.) (2008.01.31 – ...), as Auxiliary Bishop of Patriarchate of Lisboa (Portugal) (2008.01.31 – ...).

== See also ==
- List of Catholic dioceses in Portugal

== Sources and external links ==
- GCatholic - (residential and titular) bishopric
- Joaquim (de Santa Rosa de Viterbo), Elucidário das palavras, termos, e frases, que en Portugal antiguamente se usárão (Lisbon 1798), article "Caliábria"
- Enrique Flórez, España Sagrada (1786), Tratado XLIII. De la Iglesia Caliabriense. Vol. 14, pp. 37-50
- Felipe Mateu y Llopis, "Gothorum reges in Caliabria"
- José Ignacio Martín Benito, Caliabria y Ciudad Rodrigo, in Ciudad Rodrigo, Carnaval 2001, Salamanca, pp. 325–331
- F. Pérez, lemma 'Ciudad Rodrigo', in Dictionnaire d'Histoire et de Géographie ecclésiastiques, vol. XII, Paris 1953, coll. 1008-1024
- Civitas Calabriga (Monte do Castelo, Almendra)^{[usurped]}
