= Eurico dos Santos Veloso =

Brazilian bishop (1933–2023)

His Excellency Eurico dos Santos Veloso
- Archbishop Emeritus of Juiz de Fora
- Appointed: 28 November 2001
- Term ended: 28 January 2009
- Predecessor: Clóvis Frainer
- Successor: Gil Antônio Moreira
- Previous posts: Auxiliary Bishop of Juiz de Fora and Titular Bishop of Selia (1987–1991); Coadjutor Bishop of Luz (1991–1994); Bishop of Luz (1994–2001)

Orders
- Ordination: 22 September 1962
- Consecration: 5 July 1987 by Juvenal Roriz

Personal details
- Born: 13 April 1933 Sanandira, Minas Gerais, Brazil
- Died: 30 September 2023 (aged 90) Juiz de Fora, Minas Gerais, Brazil

Eurico dos Santos Veloso (13 April 1933 – 30 September 2023) was a Brazilian Roman Catholic prelate. He was auxiliary bishop of Juiz de Fora from 1987 to 1991, bishop of Luz from 1994 to 2001, and archbishop of Juiz de Fora from 2001 to 2009. He died on 30 September 2023, at the age of 90.

Catholic Church titles
Preceded by Clóvis Frainer	Archbishop of Juiz de Fora; 2001–2009	Succeeded by Gil Antônio Moreira
Preceded by Belchior Joaquim da Silva Neto	Bishop of Luz; 1994–2001	Succeeded by Antônio Carlos Félix
Preceded by —	Coadjutor Bishop of Luz; 1991–1994	Succeeded by —
Preceded by Ângelo Domingos Salvador	Titular Bishop of Selia; 1987–1991	Succeeded by Pero Sudar
Preceded by —	Auxiliary Bishop of Juiz de Fora; 1987–1991	Succeeded by —
