= Serafim Fernandes de Araújo =

Brazilian prelate (1924–2019)

His Eminence Serafim Fernandes de Araújo
- Archbishop of Belo Horizonte
- Church: Roman Catholic Church
- Archdiocese: Belo Horizonte
- See: Belo Horizonte
- Appointed: 5 February 1986
- Term ended: 28 January 2004
- Predecessor: João Resende Costa
- Successor: Walmor Oliveira de Azevedo
- Other post: Cardinal Priest of San Luigi Maria Grignion de Montfort (1998–2019)
- Previous posts: Titular Bishop of Verinopolis (1959–1982); Auxiliary Bishop of Belo Horizonte (1959–1982); Coadjutor Archbishop of Belo Horizonte (1982–1986); Vice-President of the Episcopal Conference of Brazil (1991–1995)

Orders
- Ordination: 12 March 1949 by Luigi Traglia
- Consecration: 7 May 1959 by José Newton de Almeida Baptista
- Created cardinal: 21 February 1998 by Pope John Paul II
- Rank: Cardinal priest

Personal details
- Born: 13 August 1924 Minas Novas, Brazil
- Died: 8 October 2019 (aged 95) Belo Horizonte, Brazil
- Education: Pontifical Gregorian University
- Motto: Seraphim juxta eum ('Seraphim next to him', Isaiah 6:2)

Styles of Serafim Fernandes de Araújo
- Reference style: His Eminence
- Spoken style: Your Eminence
- Religious style: Cardinal
- Informal style: Cardinal
- See: Belo Horizonte

Serafim Fernandes de Araújo (Brazilian Portuguese: [seɾɐˈfĩ feʁˈnɐ̃dʒiz dʒi ɐɾɐˈuʒu]; 13 August 1924 – 8 October 2019) was a Brazilian prelate of the Catholic Church and professor who served as Archbishop of Belo Horizonte from 1986 to 2004. He was made a cardinal of the Catholic Church by Pope John Paul II in 1998.

== Biography ==
Araújo was born in Minas Novas, in the northeast of the Brazilian state of Minas Gerais, and grew up in nearby Itamarandiba. He studied at the seminary of Diamantina from the age of twelve, graduating in humanities in 1942 and philosophy in 1944, later continuing his studies from 1949 until 1951 at the Pontifical Gregorian University in Rome, where he earned licentiates in theology and canon law.

He was ordained on 12 March 1949 in the Archbasilica of Saint John Lateran in Rome. Upon returning to Brazil in 1951, he worked in pastoral ministry in Gouveia until 1957 and later in Curvelo until 1959. Between 1951 and 1959, Araújo was also chaplain to the 3rd Military Battalion of the Minas Gerais military police, professor of canon law at the provincial seminary of Diamantina, director of religious education for the Archdiocese of Diamantina, as well as a teacher in several local schools.

On 19 January 1959, Araújo was appointed an auxiliary bishop of the Archdiocese of Belo Horizonte by Pope John XXIII, with the titular see of Verinopolis, receiving episcopal consecration on 7 May of that year. He served as rector of the Pontifical Catholic University of Minas Gerais from 1960 until 1981, and participated in the Second Vatican Council between 1962 and 1965. His ministry was focused on education and social communications – for several years, he was in charge of a daily radio programme entitled "A Palavra de Deus" ('The Word of God'), broadcast by Rádio América, as well as of a Sunday television programme.

Araújo participated in the general conferences of the Episcopal Conference of Latin America held in Puebla in 1979 and Santo Domingo in 1992; he served as one of three co-presidents for the latter conference. He was named the coadjutor archbishop of Belo Horizonte on 22 November 1982 by Pope John Paul II, succeeding João Resende Costa as archbishop on 5 February 1986. From 1991 to 1995, he served a four-year term as Vice-President of the Episcopal Conference of Brazil. Araújo was created a cardinal by Pope John Paul II in the consistory of 21 February 1998, and assigned the titular church of San Luigi Maria Grignion de Montfort. He retired as Archbishop of Belo Horizonte on 28 January 2004 and was succeeded by Walmor Oliveira de Azevedo.

Araújo died on 8 October 2019 in Belo Horizonte due to complications from pneumonia.

== See also ==
- Cardinals created by John Paul II

Catholic Church titles
Preceded by João Resende Costa	Archbishop of Belo Horizonte; 1986−2004	Succeeded by Walmor Oliveira de Azevedo
Preceded by Robert Coffy	Cardinal Priest of San Luigi Maria Grignion de Montfort; 25 February 1998 − 8 October 2019	Succeeded by Felipe Arizmendi Esquivel
