= Antônio do Carmo Cheuiche =

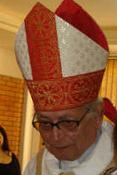
Bishop Antônio do Carmo Cheuiche

Antônio do Carmo Cheuiche OCD (June 13, 1927 in Caçapava do Sul – October 14, 2009 in Ivoti) was a Brazilian priest and professor who served auxiliary bishop of Santa Maria (1969–1971) and Porto Alegre (1971–2001). He taught philosophy of art at the Federal University of Rio Grande do Sul.
