= St. Anthony Cathedral, Juiz de Fora =

St. Anthony Cathedral
- Catedral Metropolitana Santo Antônio
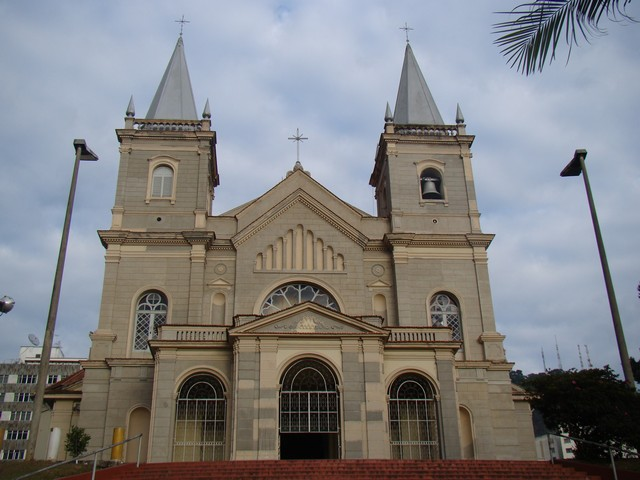
- St. Anthony Cathedral
- 21°45′50″S 43°21′00″W
- Location: Juiz de Fora
- Country: Brazil
- Denomination: Roman Catholic Church

Administration
- Archdiocese: Juiz de Fora

The St. Anthony Cathedral (Portuguese: Catedral Metropolitana Santo Antônio) Also Juiz de Fora Cathedral Is a Catholic church located in the city of Juiz de Fora, in the South American country of Brazil. It is the seat of the Catholic archdiocese of Juiz de Fora, whose jurisdiction covers 37 municipalities in the area of Mata Mineira, and is the temple Official of Metropolitan Archbishop Gil Antonio Moreira, which houses the main and most solemn events and celebrations of the Catholic Church in the region.

The cathedral is under the administration of the parish priest and vicar general of the archdiocese, Monsignor Luiz Carlos de Paula; Four parochial vicars, priests Antônio Pereira Gaio, Danilo Celso de Castro, Fransergio García y Welington Nascimento de Souza; and Two permanent deacons, Ruy Figueiredo Neves and Waldeci Silva.

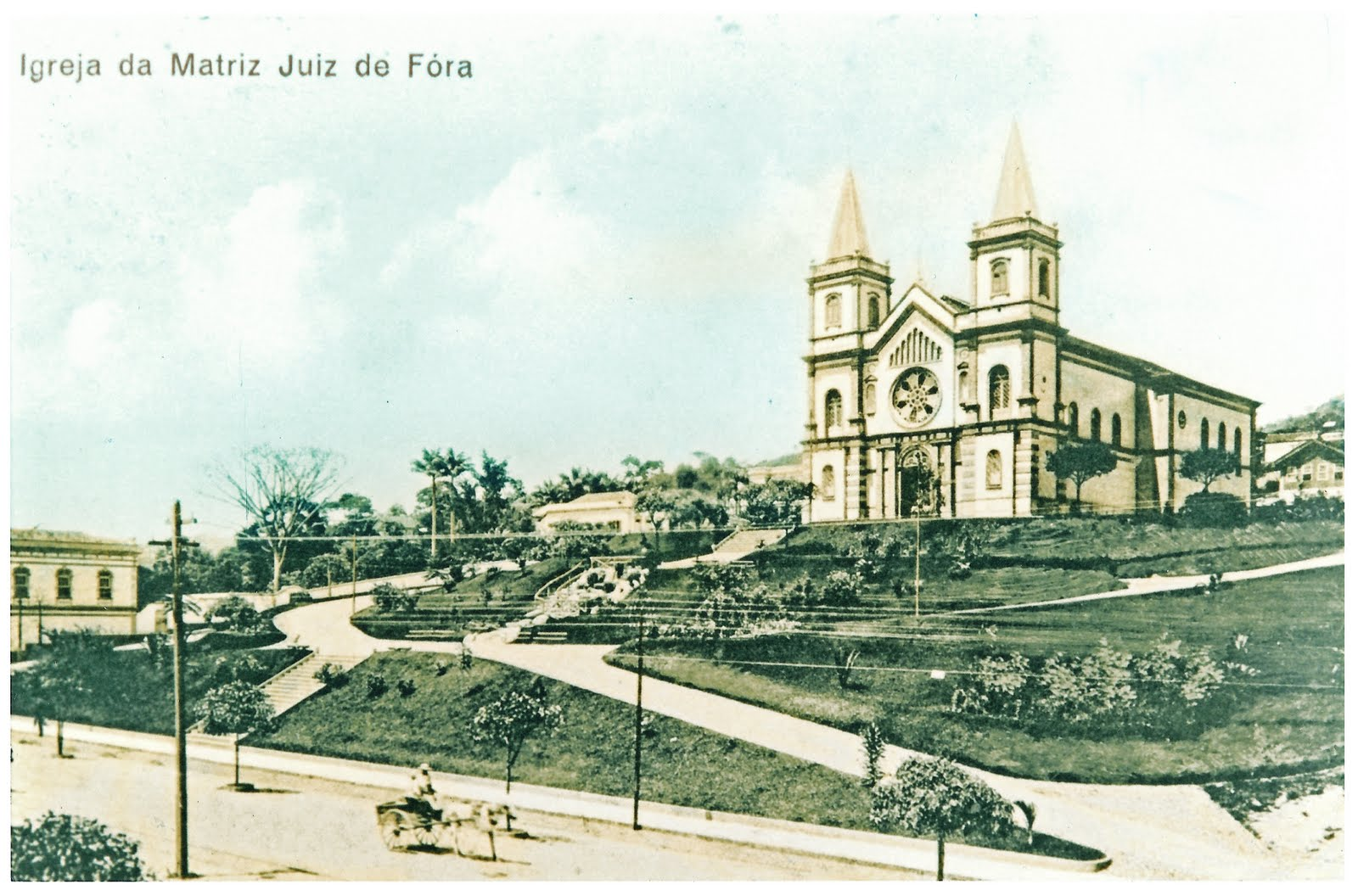
The church in 1913

== See also ==
- Roman Catholicism in Brazil
