= Bernt Tunold =

Norwegian painter (1877–1946)

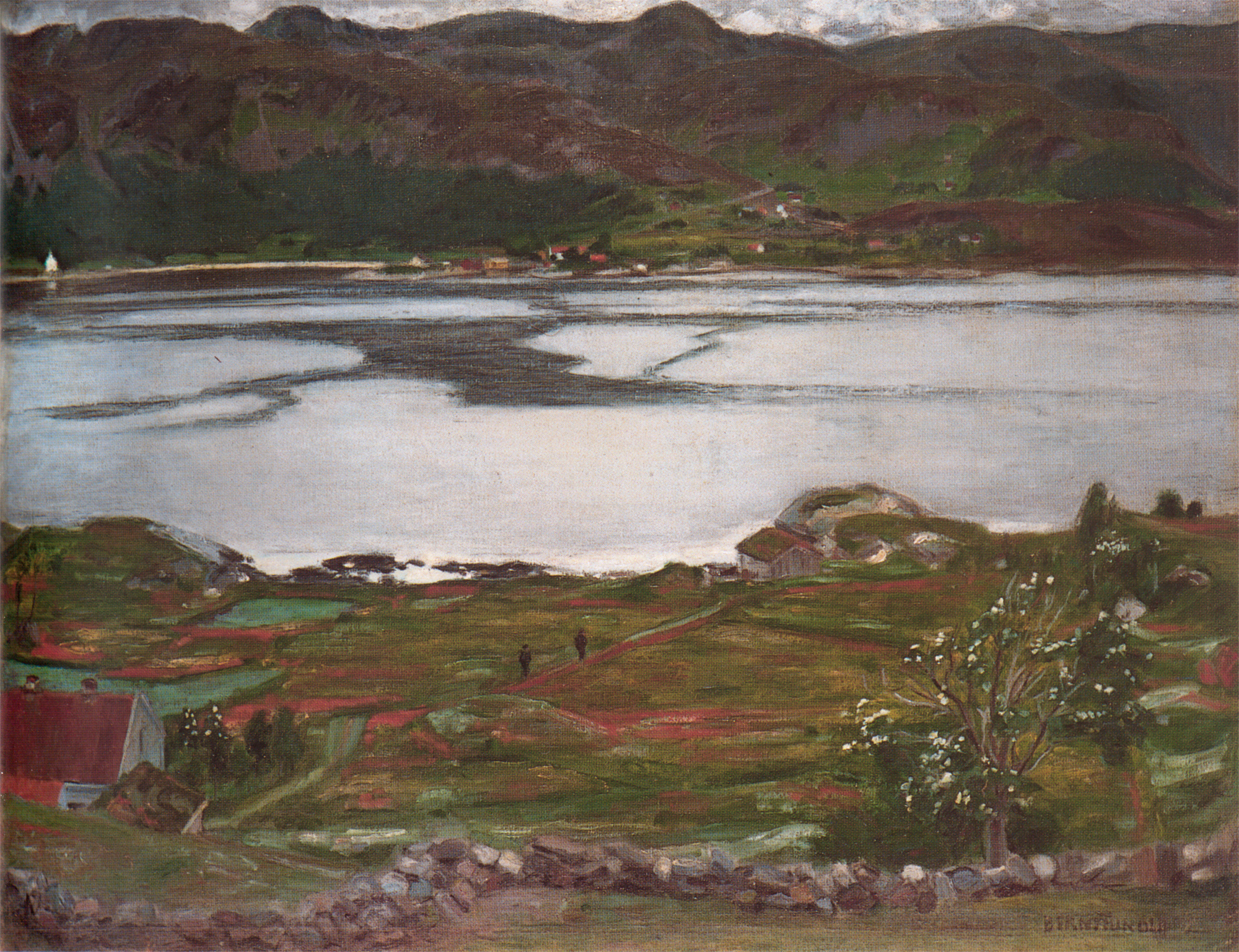
Bernt Tunold, Vårstemning, Selje (1914 or 1915).

Bernt Tunold (February 25, 1877 – January 23, 1946) was a Norwegian painter. Influenced by his early years in a rural environment on the small island of Selja on the west coast of Norway, his paintings, initially inspired by the style of his countryman Nikolai Astrup, are known for their depictions of the dramatic and contrast-filled nature and landscape of western Norway.

== Life ==
=== Early life ===
Tunold was born on the island of Selja on Norway's west coast. His father, an emigrant from Stryn Municipality, and his mother, a native of Vanylven Municipality, had established a farm on the church grounds on the island. Bernt, the youngest of nine siblings, was named after his father and the island priest, Wilhelm Koren. Selja was a poor rural society, but was not separated from the surrounding world. A steamboat frequently visited the island, carrying passengers to the mainland or Bergen, later serving as the first part of a poor peasant's journey to America. The family farm, which Tunold depicted in several of his works, had, according to the census of 1875, three cows, one bull, a dozen sheep and a few goats. This could not support a family of eleven, and the father was forced to work as a travelling tailor in the winter.

In the Middle Ages, one the country's three bishops had his seat on the island for a time, but the bishop's seat was later moved to Bergen. During the reign of king Sigurd Jorsalfare, a Benedictine monastery, Selje Abbey, was built, but it burned to the ground in 1305. It is not clear whether the monastery was rebuilt: according to some sources, a monastery "existed on the island in 1451", while according to other sources, Selja's monastic community was eradicated when the Black Death arrived in 1349. At the time of Tunold's childhood, only the ruins of the monastery, a tower 14 meters high and low walls, still remained. Tunold often explored the ruin, later writing poems and making drawings of it. The church contained most of the art present on the island: most likely, the first paintings Tunold had a chance to study were the altarpiece and the portraits of the priests Claus and Peder Frimann.

=== Bergen ===
In 1895, Tunold left Selja for Bergen, where he was to live for most of his life. In a few decades around the turn of the century, Bergen developed into a large, modern city. The population was doubled, and the city's wooden houses were largely replaced with high, "continental" style brick buildings. A tram system was opened in 1897, and electric lighting became available in 1900. Tunold was one of the many emigrants in Bergen from Sogn og Fjordane; in fact, in 1900, a third of the city's population were immigrants from the surrounding rural districts. The immigrants often felt like foreigners in Bergen, where life was very different from what they were used to. This led to the foundation of several associations where rural culture and language was maintained.

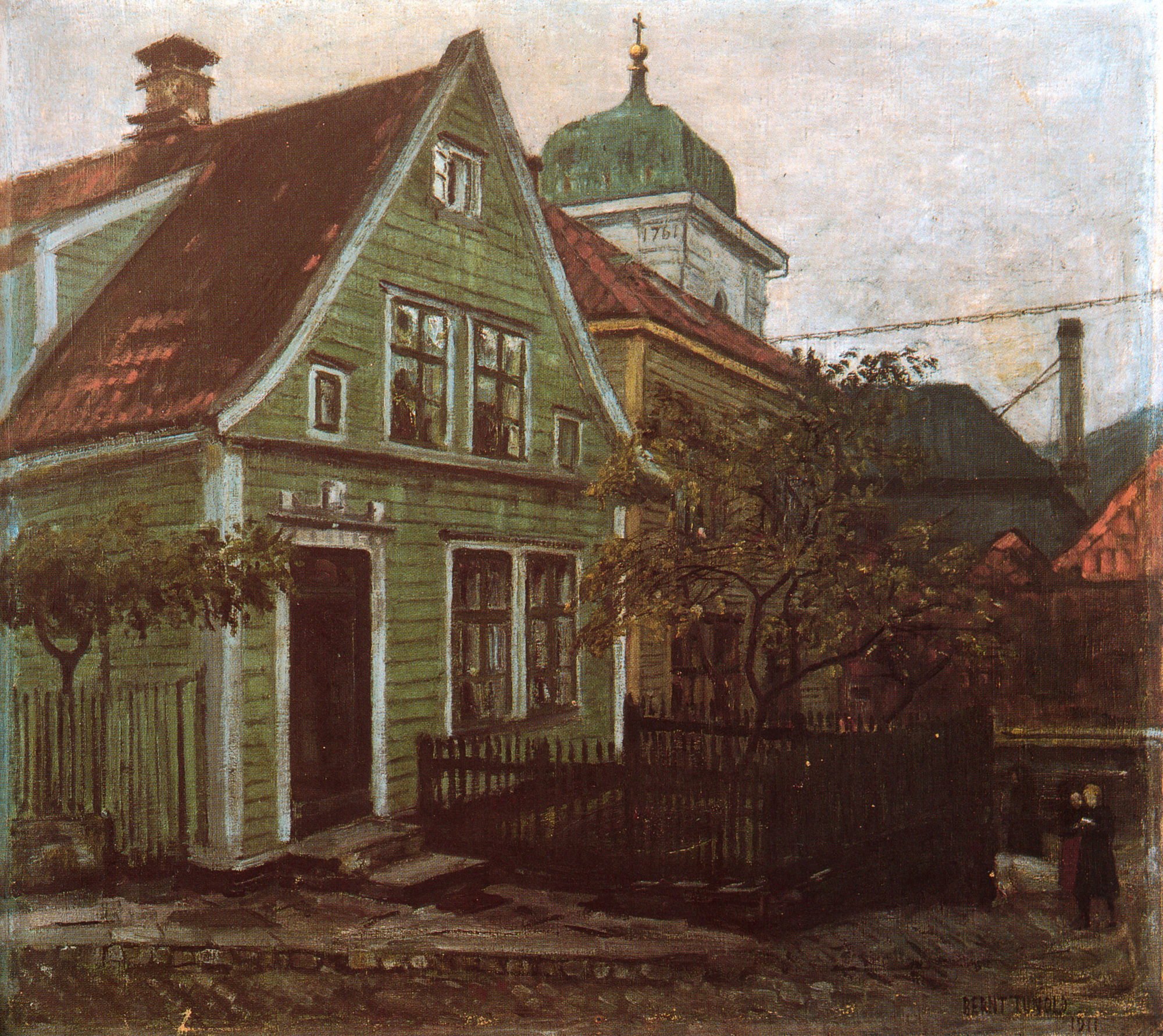
Klokkersmuget 4 (1911), one of Tunold's few paintings of Bergen.

Bernt Tunold went to Bergen to attend the school for non-commissioned officers. However, there are many indications that Tunold found it difficult to accept the requirements of discipline at the school, and he was forced to quit after only two years. Following this, he gained contact with Olav Rusti, the leader of a rural society in Bergen and a painter. Tunold was allowed to serve as a model for Rusti's paintings. A few years later, he returned to Selja, painting and drawing the monastery ruins. In the autumn of 1901, he travelled to Bergen again, where he began educating himself as a painter.

The painter Henrik Asor Hansen had established a painting school in Bergen, and Tunold attended this school during the winters of 1901 and 1902, along with most of the local talents, including among others Sophus Madsen and Mons Breidvik. Tunold learned the basic techniques of drawing and painting. Asor Hansen, the teacher, and the leader of the Bergen Art Association from 1905-1910, was quite a controversial figure. He painted in a traditional, naturalistic style, with limited use of colours. Tunold's extensive use of dark colours did not please Asor Hansen, and they developed a strained relationship, leading to Tunold quitting the school in 1903. Tunold later complained that Asor Hansen had ruined his painting style.

While most of his fellow students left Bergen upon finishing the painting school, many travelling to Copenhagen or even Paris, Tunold stayed in Bergen where he became part of the city's rural society. Olav Rusti, one of its leaders, had lived in a German monastery for eleven years, having previously belonged to the Norwegian artistic community in Munich. Upon returning to Norway, he committed himself to working for the Norwegian rural culture movement. His home, Urdi, served as the meeting place for like-minded people, including the writer Arne Garborg. The movement was conservative and idealistic: it aimed to preserve the rural culture which was about to lose the battle against modernisation. During the first few years of the 20th century, Tunold became an almost fanatical champion for the cause.

=== Later life ===
Tunold bought an old smoke cottage in 1916 in Gloppen Municipality, in Sogn og Fjordane. The cottage, where he lived for almost four years, as well as its surroundings, was the subject of many of his paintings from this period. He married Edel Prøitz in 1920, and they had one child. Unable to purchase the land lot where the smoke cottage was located, Tunold moved the cottage to Selje. For economic reasons, the family was forced to sell the cottage and move to Bergen. Tunold made several journeys in western Norway in the last 25 years of his life, leaving his family in order to paint landscapes, portraits, still lives and interiors. Bernt Tunold died in Bergen on January 23, 1946.
