= Roman Catholic Diocese of Uruguaiana =

Catholic ecclesiastical territory

Diocese of Uruguaiana Dioecesis Uruguaianensis

Catholic
- Catedral Senhora Sant’Ana

Location
- Country: Brazil
- Ecclesiastical province: Santa Maria

Statistics
- Area: 38,795 km^{2} (14,979 sq mi)
- Population: Total; Catholics: (as of 2010); 467,000; 348,000 (74.5%)

Information
- Denomination: Catholic Church
- Sui iuris church: Latin Church
- Rite: Roman Rite
- Established: 15 August 1910 (116 years ago)
- Cathedral: Catedral Senhora Sant’Ana

Current leadership
- Pope: Leo XIV
- Bishop: Clésio Facco, S.A.C.
- Metropolitan Archbishop: Leomar Antônio Brustolin

Website
- Official website

The Diocese of Uruguaiana (Latin: Dioecesis Uruguaianensis) is a Latin Church ecclesiastical territory or diocese of the Catholic Church in Rio Grande do Sul state, Brazil. It is a suffragan diocese in the ecclesiastical province of the metropolitan Archdiocese of Santa Maria.

Its cathedra episcopal see is Catedral Senhora Sant’Ana, dedicated to St. Anne, in Uruguaiana.

== History ==
- Established on 15 August 1910 Diocese of Uruguaiana / Uruguaianenv(sis) (Latin), on territory split off from the then Diocese of São Pedro do Rio Grande (now Archdiocese)
- Lost territory repeatedly: on 25 June 1960 to establish Diocese of Bagé, on 22 May 1961 to establish Diocese of Santo Angelo, in 2001 to the Diocese of Santo Angelo.

== Statistics ==
As per 2014, it pastorally served 365,000 Catholics (74.5% of 490,000 total) on 35,439 km^{2} (13,683 sq mi) in 16 parishes and 286 missions with 26 priests (23 diocesan, 3 religious), 63 lay religious (9 brothers, 54 sisters) and 10 seminarians.

== Episcopal ordinaries ==
(all Brazilians and Latin rite)

- Hermeto José Pinheiro (12 May 1911 - 3 November 1941)
- Jose Newton de Almeida Baptista : 10 June 1944 (appointed) - 5 January 1954), next Metropolitan Archbishop of Diamantina (Brazil) (5 January 1954 – 12 March 1960); Archbishop-Bishop of Brasília (Brazil) (12 March 1960 – 11 October 1966), last Archbishop Military Vicar of Brazil (Brazil) (9 November 1963 – 21 July 1986), Metropolitan Archbishop of (see promoted) Brasília (Brazil) (11 October 1966 – 15 February 1984), first Archbishop Military Ordinary of Brazil (Brazil) (21 July 1986 – retired 31 October 1990), died 2001.
- Luiz Felipe de Nadal (9 May 1955 - death 1 July 1963)
- Augusto Petró (12 March 1964 - retired 5 July 1995), died 2008; previously Bishop of Vacaria (Brazil) (16 May 1958 – 12 March 1964)
- Pedro Ercílio Simon (5 July 1995 - 16 September 1998), previously Coadjutor Bishop of Cruz Alta (Brazil) (24 October 1990 – 5 July 1995); next Coadjutor Bishop of Passo Fundo) succeeding as (last Suffragan) Bishop of Passo Fundo (19 May 1999 – 13 April 2011), (see)promoted first Metropolitan Archbishop of Passo Fundo (13 April 2011 – retired 11 July 2012)
- Ângelo Domingos Salvador (26 May 1999 - retired 27 June 2007), previously Titular Bishop of Selia (16 March 1981 – 16 May 1986) as Auxiliary Bishop of Archdiocese of São Salvador da Bahia (Brazil) (16 March 1981 – 16 May 1986), Bishop-Prelate of Territorial Prelature of Coxim (Brazil) (16 May 1986 – 17 July 1991), Bishop of Cachoeira do Sul (Brazil) (17 July 1991 – 26 May 1999)
- Aloísio Alberto Dilli (27 June 2007 - 13 July 2016), next Bishop of Santa Cruz do Sul (Brazil) (13 July 2016 – date)
- José Mário Scalon Angonese (31 May 2017 – 2 May 2024)
- Clésio Facco, S.A.C. (28 May 2025 – present)

It has had no auxiliary bishops.

== See also ==
- List of Catholic dioceses in Brazil
