= Diocese of Cachoeira do Sul =

Catholic ecclesiastical territory

Coordinates: 30.0487°S 52.8905°W

Diocese of Cachoeira do Sul Dioecesis Cachoëirensis Australis

Catholic
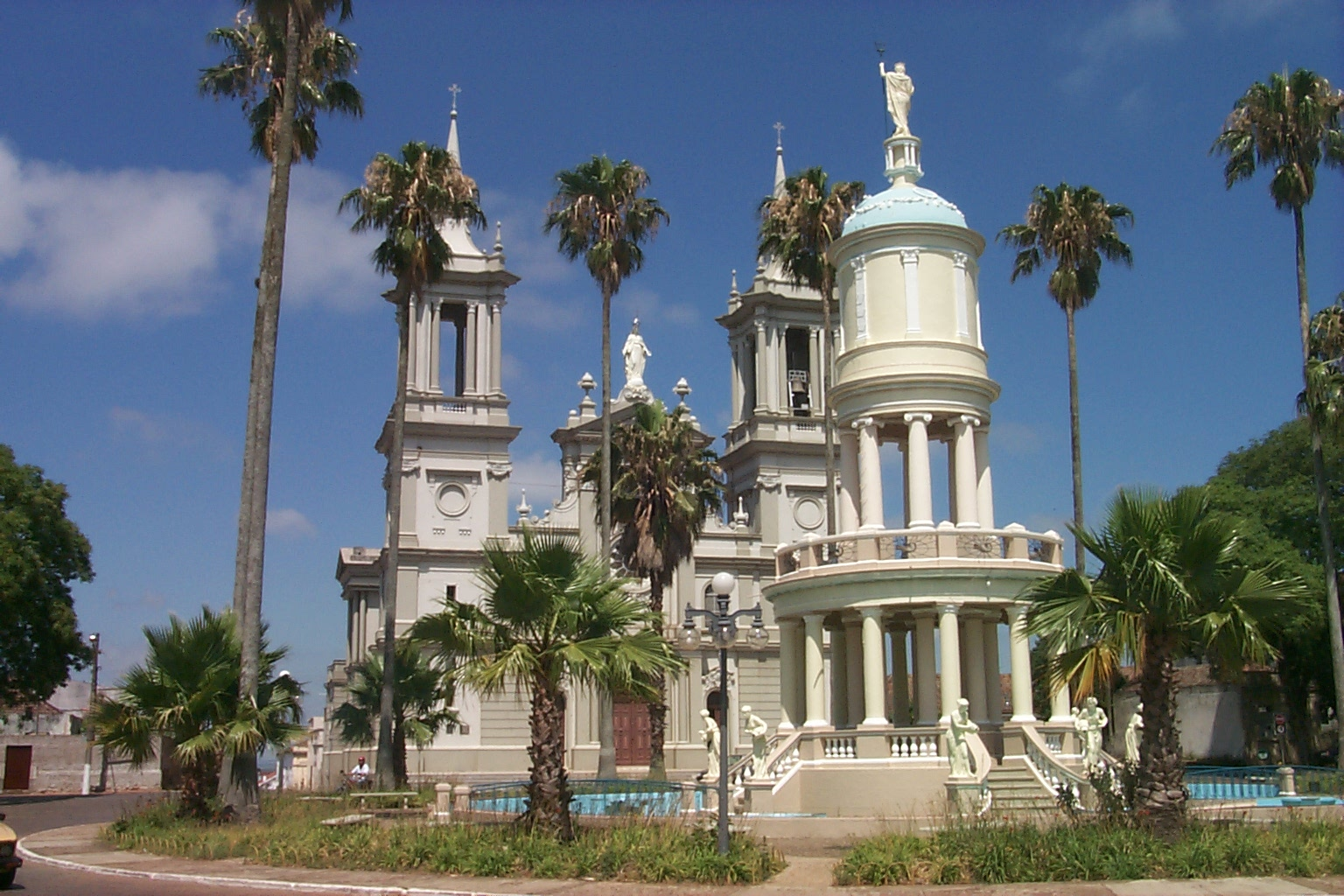
- Cathedral of Our Lady of the Conception

Location
- Country: Brazil
- Ecclesiastical province: Santa Maria

Statistics
- Area: 10,736 km^{2} (4,145 sq mi)
- Population: Total; Catholics: (as of 2006); 209,000; 145,700 (69.7%)

Information
- Rite: Latin Rite
- Established: 17 July 1991 (35 years ago)
- Cathedral: Catedral da Nossa Senhora da Conceição

Current leadership
- Pope: Leo XIV
- Bishop: Edson Batista de Mello
- Metropolitan Archbishop: Hélio Adelar Rubert

Website
- www.diocesenet.com.br

The Roman Catholic Diocese of Cachoeira do Sul (Latin: Dioecesis Cachoëirensis Australis) is a suffragan diocese in the ecclesiastical province of Santa Maria in southern Brazil.

Its cathedral episcopal see is Catedral da Nossa Senhora da Conceição, dedicated to Our Lady of Conception, in the city of Cachoeira do Sul, Rio Grande do Sul state.

== History ==
- Established on 17 July 1991 as Diocese of Cachoeira do Sul, on territory split off from the Diocese of Santa Maria (which became its Metropolitan).

== Statistics ==
As per 2015, it pastorally served 173,800 Catholics (74.0% of 234,900 total) on 10,730 km^{2} in 13 parishes with 24 priests (20 diocesan, 4 religious), 17 deacons, 23 lay religious (5 brothers, 18 sisters) and 8 seminarians.

== Episcopal ordinaries ==
(all Roman rite)

Suffragan Bishops of Cachoeira do Sul

- Ângelo Domingos Salvador, Order of Capuchin Friars Minor (O.F.M. Cap.) (1991.07.17 – 1999.05.26); previously Titular Bishop of Selia (1981.03.16 – 1986.05.16) as Auxiliary Bishop of Archdiocese of São Salvador da Bahia (Brazil) (1981.03.16 – 1986.05.16), Bishop-Prelate of Territorial Prelature of Coxim (Brazil) (1986.05.16 – 1991.07.17); later Bishop of Uruguaiana (Brazil) (1999.05.26 – retirement 2007.06.27)
- Irineu Silvio Wilges, Order of Friars Minor (O.F.M.) (2000.06.14 – retired 2011.12.28)
- Remídio José Bohn (2011.12.28 - death 2018.01.06); previously Titular Bishop of Uchi Maius (2006.01.18 – 2011.12.28) as Auxiliary Bishop of Archdiocese of Porto Alegre (Brazil) (2006.01.18 – 2011.12.28)
- Edson Batista de Mello (2019.05.22 - present)

== See also ==
- List of Catholic dioceses in Brazil

== Sources and References ==
- GCatholic.org, with Google map, data for all sections
- Catholic Hierarchy
- official Diocesan website (Portuguese)
