= Selja, Stad =

Small island in Vestland, Norway

Selja
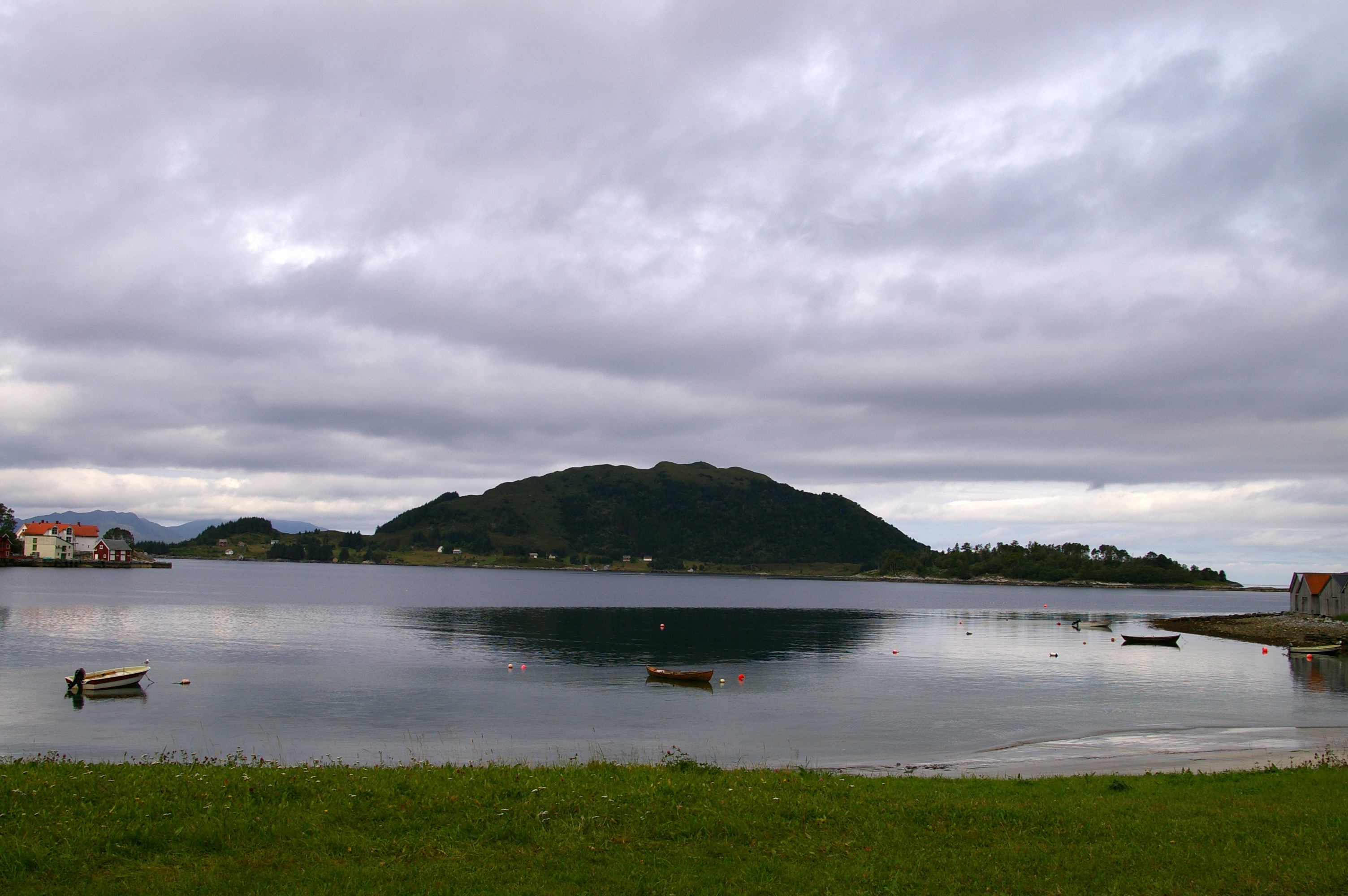
- View of Selja island from Selje village
- Interactive map of Selja

Geography
- Location: Vestland, Norway
- Coordinates: 62.0487°N 5.2952°E
- Area: 1.6 km^{2} (0.62 sq mi)
- Length: 1.4 km (0.87 mi)
- Width: 1.5 km (0.93 mi)
- Highest elevation: 201 m (659 ft)
- Highest point: Varden

Administration
- Norway
- County: Vestland
- Municipality: Stad Municipality

Selja is a small island in Stad Municipality in Vestland county, Norway. It was the original Catholic bishopric in Norway (Latin: Selia; now a titular see) which later became the pre-Reformation Ancient Diocese of Bergen (Bjørgvin). The island name was historically spelled as Sellø or Selø.

The island is located in the Sildagapet bay, just 1 kilometre (0.62 mi) west of the harbor in the village of Selje which sits at the base of the Stadlandet peninsula. The sparsely populated island has about 5 permanent residents who commute by boat to the mainland since the island is not accessible by road.

The painter Bernt Tunold grew up on the island, where his parents had established a farm on the church grounds.

== Ecclesiastical history ==
The island is mainly known for its connection to Saint Sunniva, who, according to legend, landed and died there in the late 10th century and remains patron saint of the Diocese of Bergen. The discovery at Selo in 996 of the supposed remains of Sunniva and her companions led Norwegian King Olaf Tryggvason (995-1000) to build a church there. Today, the ruins of a monastery named "Sankta Sunniva kloster" (Selje Abbey) is the only notable feature on the island. The cave of Saint Sunniva and the ruins of an early (and very small) cathedral are also located on the island. The cathedral was the episcopal see of a Catholic Bishopric, the Diocese of Selja (Latin: Selia), the predecessor of the Ancient Diocese of Bergen, a suffragan of the German (Upper Saxon) Archbishopric of Bremen, established with the monastery circa 1060 by King Olaf Kyrre. Its physical see was soon moved to Bjørgvin (Bergen), but it would take a few more bishops until that name supplanted Selja's.

=== Residential Suffragan bishops of Selja ===
- Bjarnvard (Bernard the Saxon) since 106O?7, Bishop of Selja till his death (1066?67)
- Svein, Bishop of Selja, first also known as Bishop of Bjørgvin (Bergen)
- (1115), (1128): Magnus, Bishop of Selja
- (1135): Ottar Islänning, Bishop of Selja
- 1156/57–1160: Paal, Bishop of Selja
- 1160–1170 (1194): Nikolas Petersson of Sogn, 'last' Bishop of Selja, 'first' only known as Bishop of Bergen (Bjørgvin) after 1170

=== Titular see ===
The diocese, whose successor Bergen was suppressed in 1537 due to Denmark-Norway's Lutheran Reformation, was nominally restored in 1930 as Latin Catholic Titular bishopric of Selja (in Latin and Curiate Italian; Latin adjective Selien(sis)) and renamed Selia in Latin in 1971 (still Selja in Italian).

It has had the following incumbents, so far all of the fitting episcopal (lowest) rank :

- Olaf Offerdahl (1930.03.13 – death 1930.10.07) as Apostolic Vicar of Norway (Norway, Selja's home country) (1930.03.13 – 1930.10.07), previously Apostolic Administrator of the same vicariate (1928.10.11 – 1930.03.13)
- Jacques Mangers, Marists S.M. (1932.07.12 – 1953.06.29) as first Apostolic Vicar of Oslo (previously called 'of Norway', see above) (1932.07.12 – 1953.06.29), promoted first Exempt Bishop of Oslo (Norway) (1953.06.29 – 1964.11.25), emeritate as Titular Bishop of Afufenia (1964.11.25 – death 1972.01.07)
- Claude Dupuy (1955.03.07 – 1961.12.04) as Auxiliary Bishop of Lyon (primatial see in France) (1955.03.07 – 1961.12.04); later Metropolitan Archbishop of Albi (France) (1961.12.04 – retired 1974.06.15); died 1989
- Eduard Macheiner (1963.03.01 – 1969.10.09) as Auxiliary Bishop of Salzburg (primatial see of Austria) (1963.03.01 – 1969.10.09), later succeeded as Metropolitan Archbishop of Salzburg (Austria) ([1969.10.09] 1969.10.18 – death 1972.07.17)
- Salvador Lazo Lazo (1969.12.01 – 1981.01.20) first as Auxiliary Bishop of Tuguegarao (Philippines) (1969.12.01 – 1977.08.03), then as Auxiliary Bishop of Nueva Segovia (Philippines) (1977.08.03 – 1981.01.20); later Bishop of San Fernando de La Union (Philippines) (1981.01.20 – retired 1993.05.28), died 2000
- Ângelo Domingos Salvador, Capuchin Franciscans (O.F.M. Cap.) (1981.03.16 – 1986.05.16) as Auxiliary Bishop of São Salvador da Bahia (Brazil) (1981.03.16 – 1986.05.16); later Bishop-Prelate of Coxim (Brazil) (1986.05.16 – 1991.07.17), Bishop of Cachoeira do Sul (Brazil) (1991.07.17 – 1999.05.26), Bishop of Uruguaiana (Brazil) (1999.05.26 – retired 2007.06.27)
- Eurico dos Santos Veloso (1987.03.12 – 1991.05.22) as Auxiliary Bishop of Juiz de Fora (Brazil) (1987.03.12 – 1991.05.22); later Coadjutor Bishop of Luz (Brazil) (1991.05.22 – 1994.05.18), Bishop of above Luz (1994.05.18 – 2001.11.28), Metropolitan Archbishop of above Juiz de For) (2001.11.28 – retired 2009.01.28)
- Pero Sudar (1993.05.28 – ...), Auxiliary Bishop of Vrhbosna (Sarajevo, Bosnia and Herzegovina)

== Media gallery ==
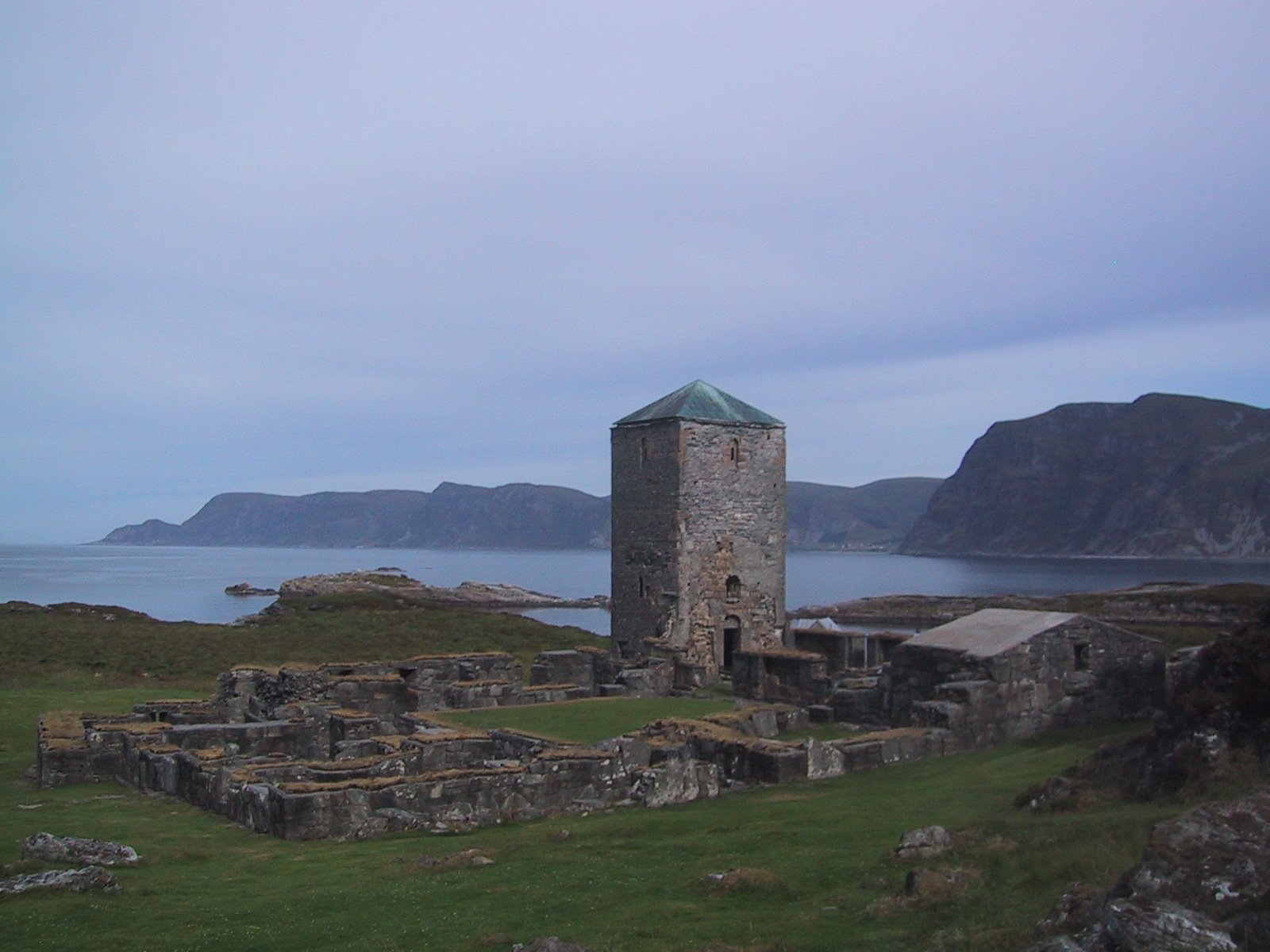
View of the Church ruins on the island

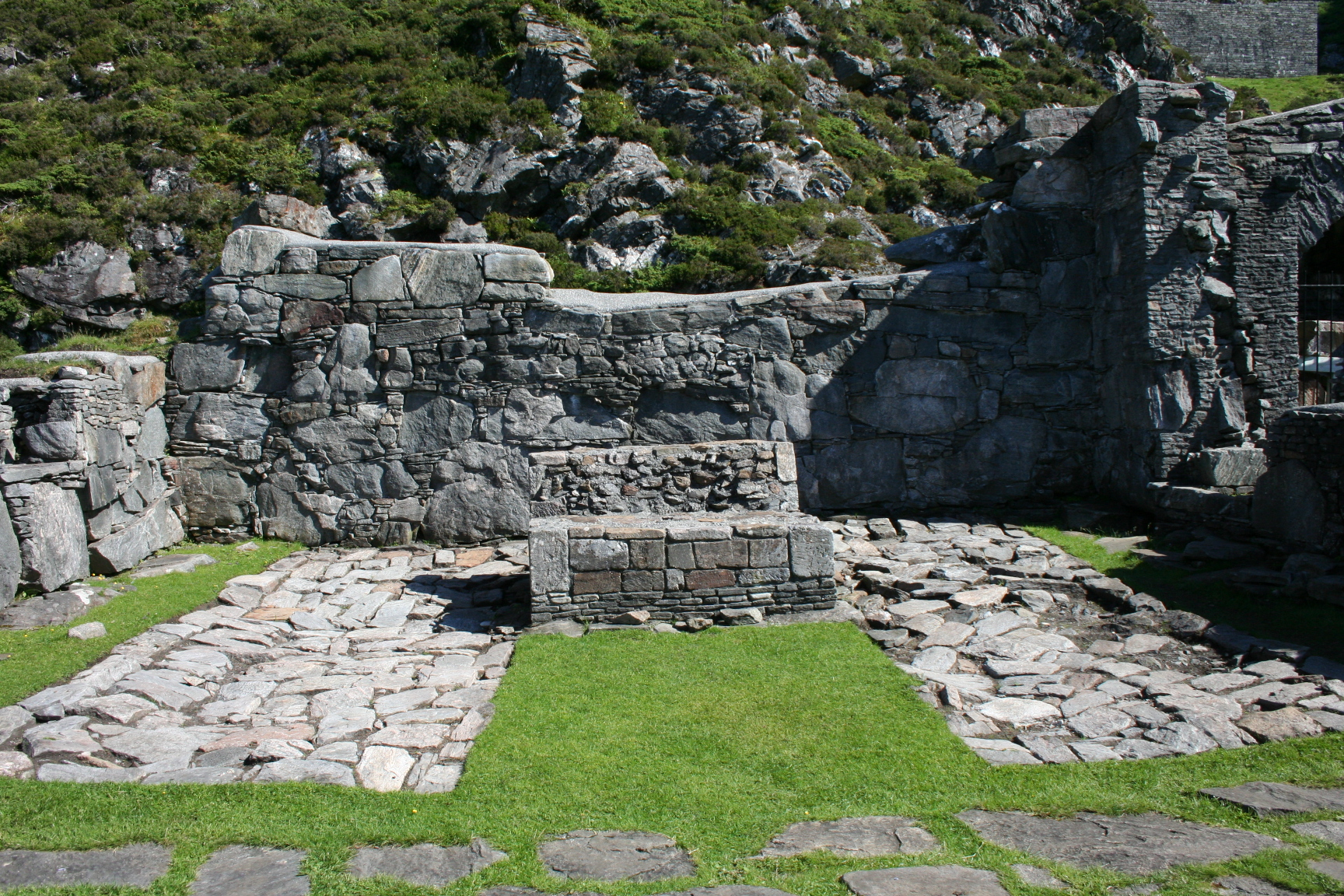
Altar in the Albanus Church in the Abbey

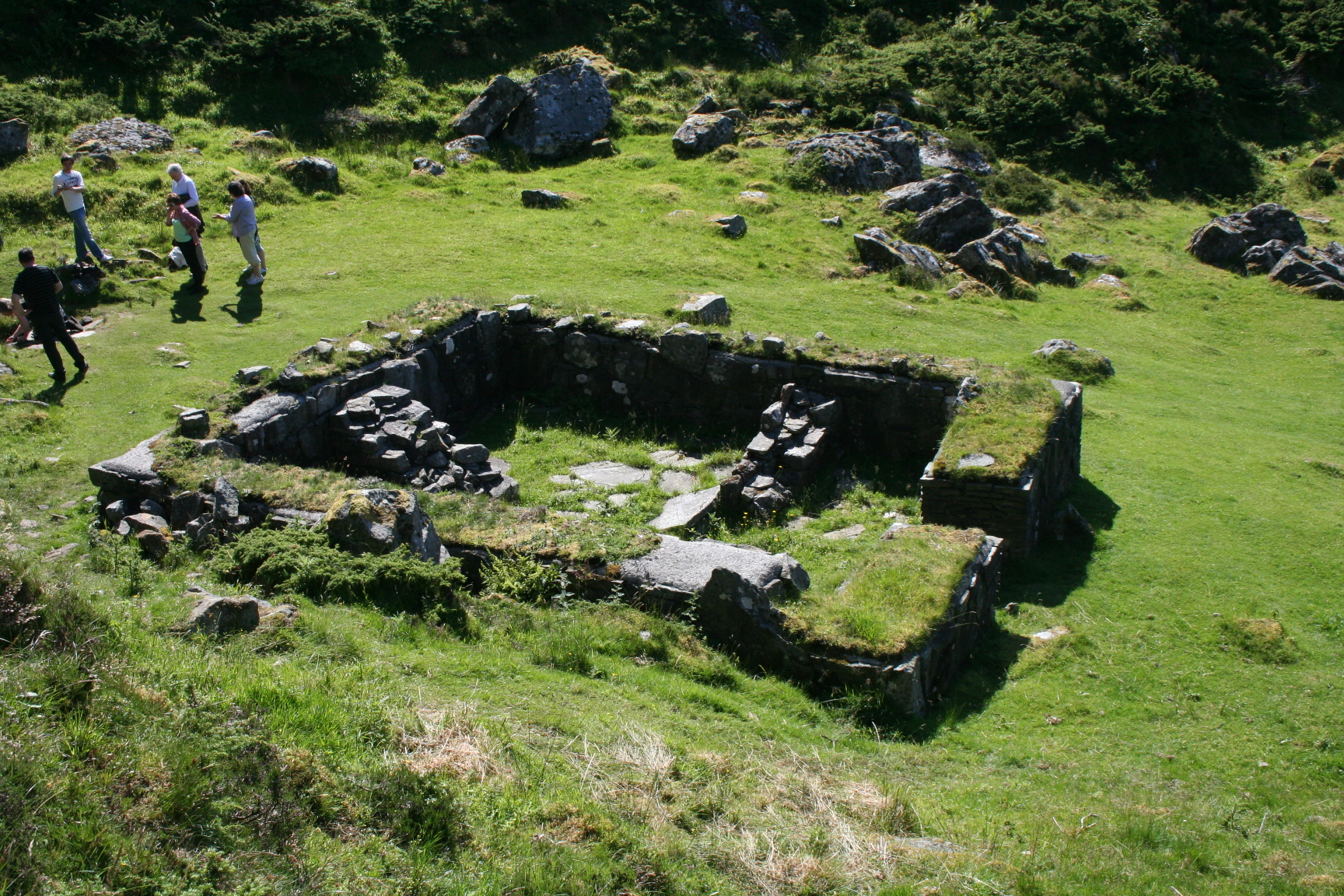
The forge at the abbey

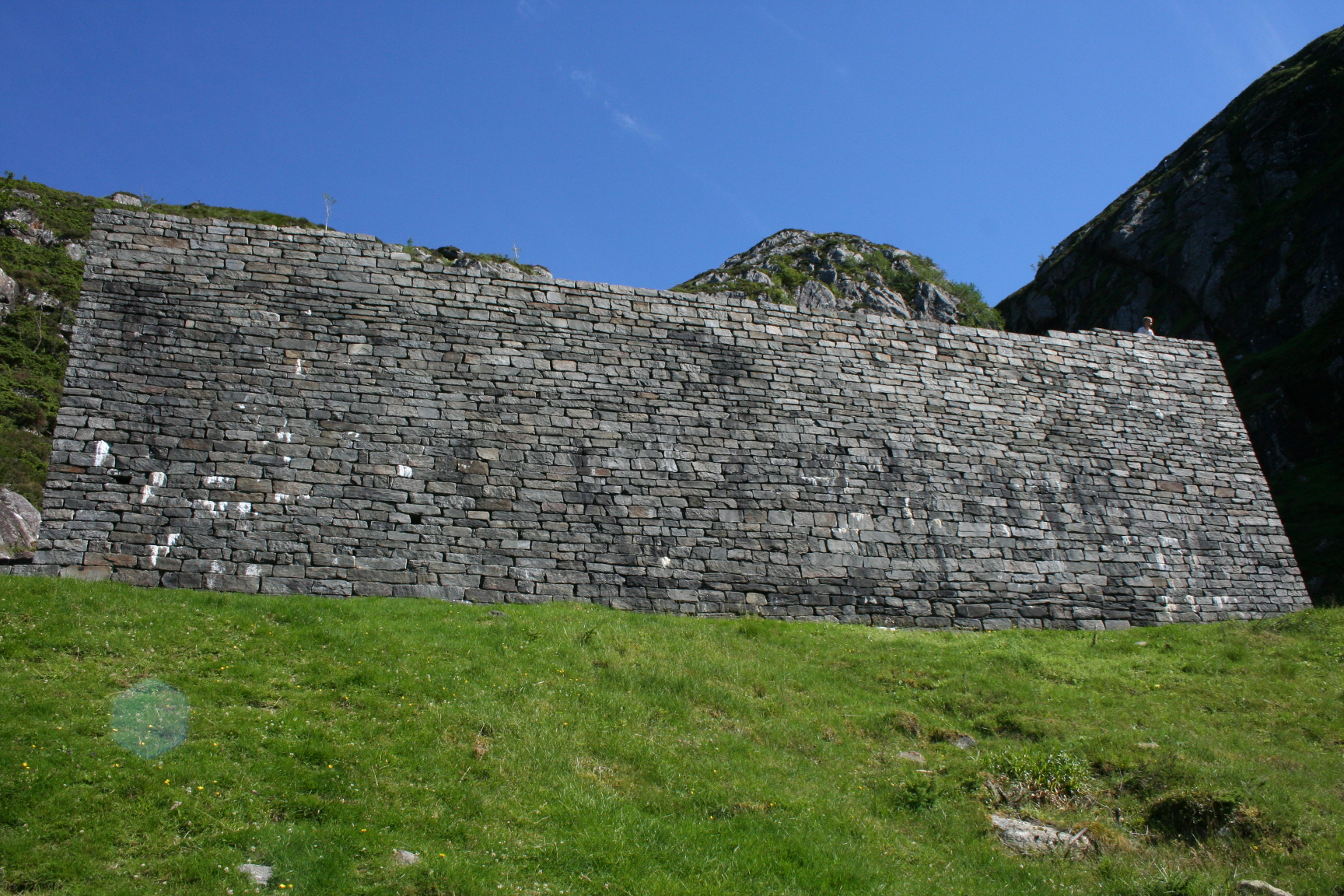
A wall in front of the Sunniva Church

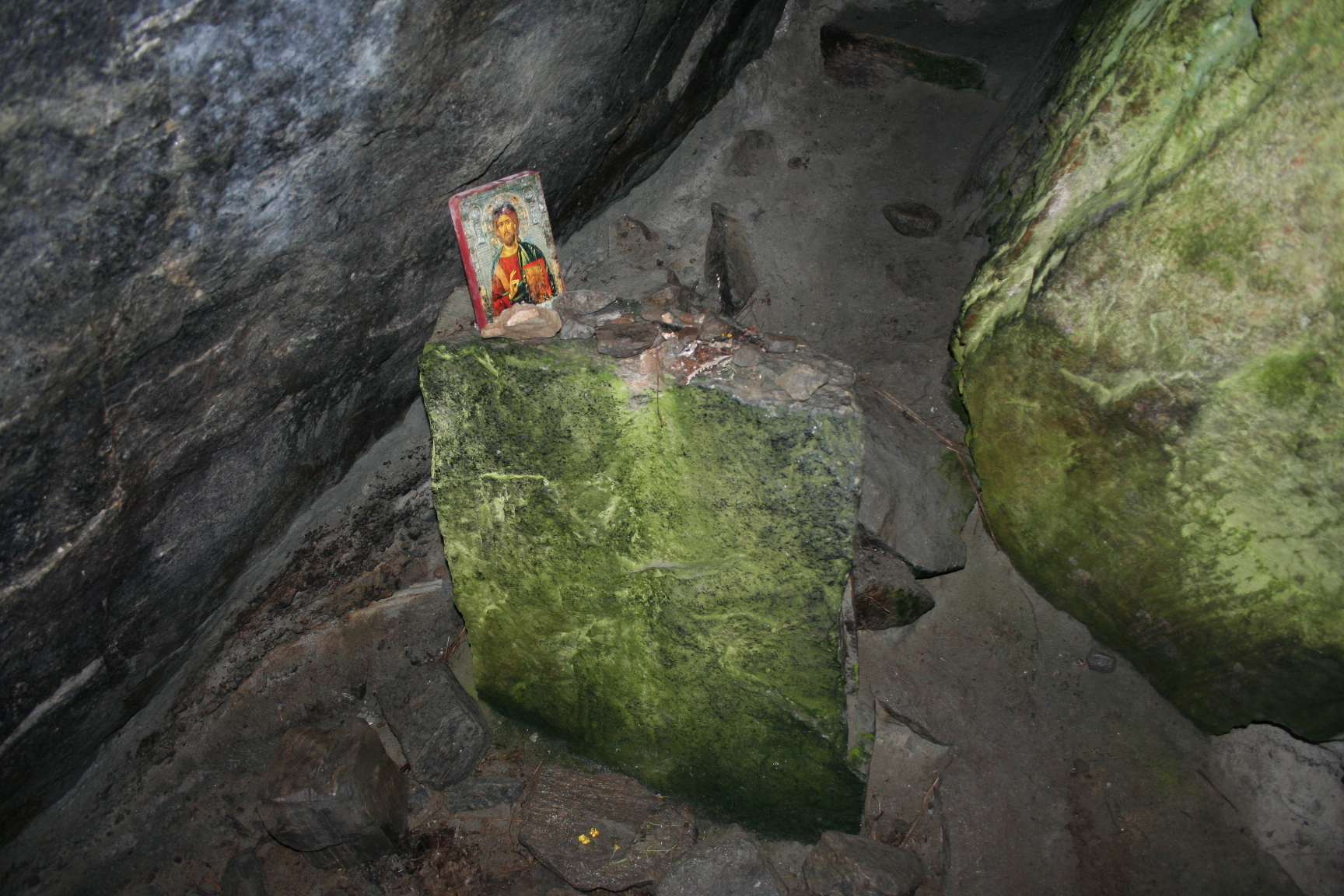
Altar in the Mikaels Church in the Abbey

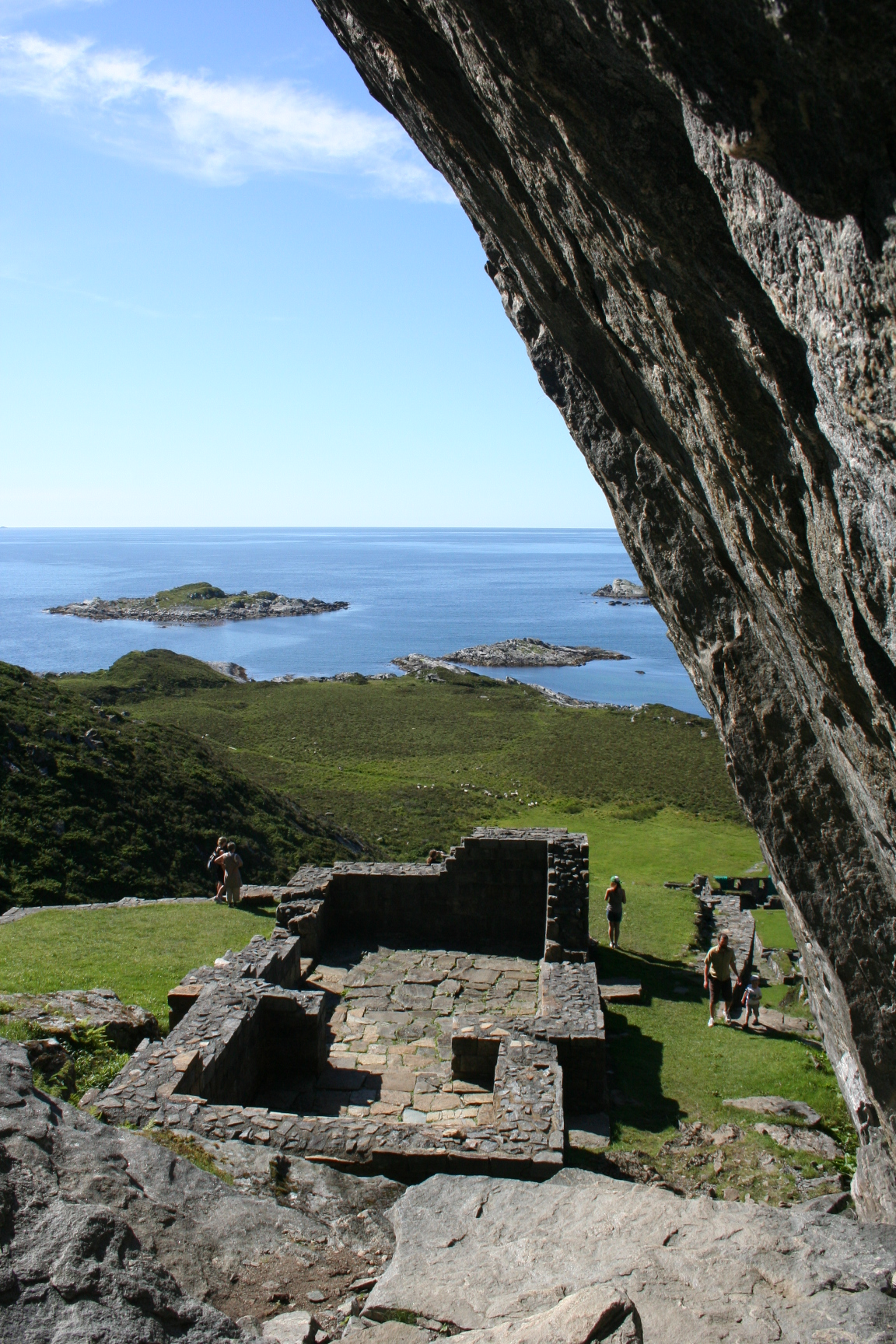
Cliff at the entrance to the Mikaels Church

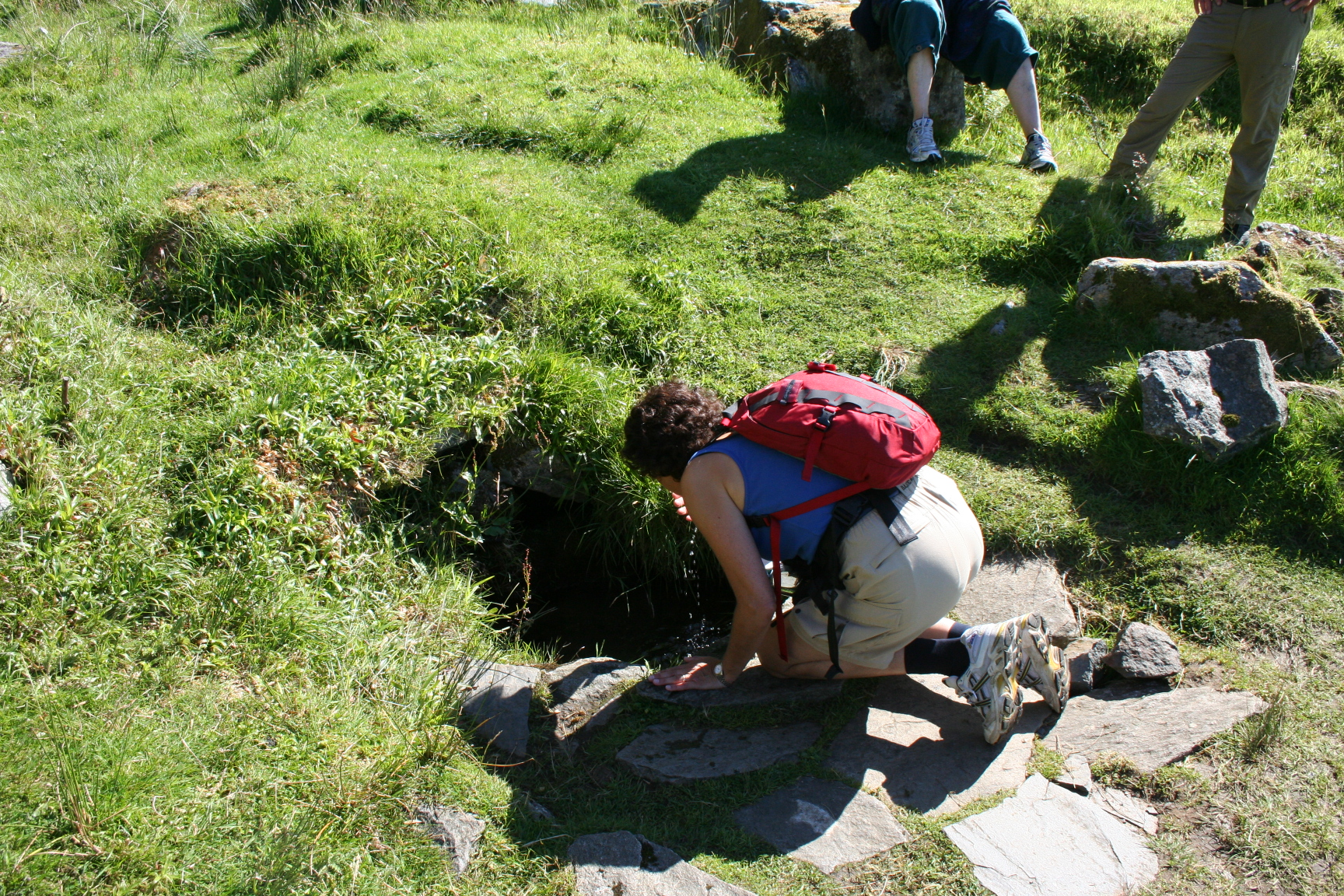
Well at Sunniva Church

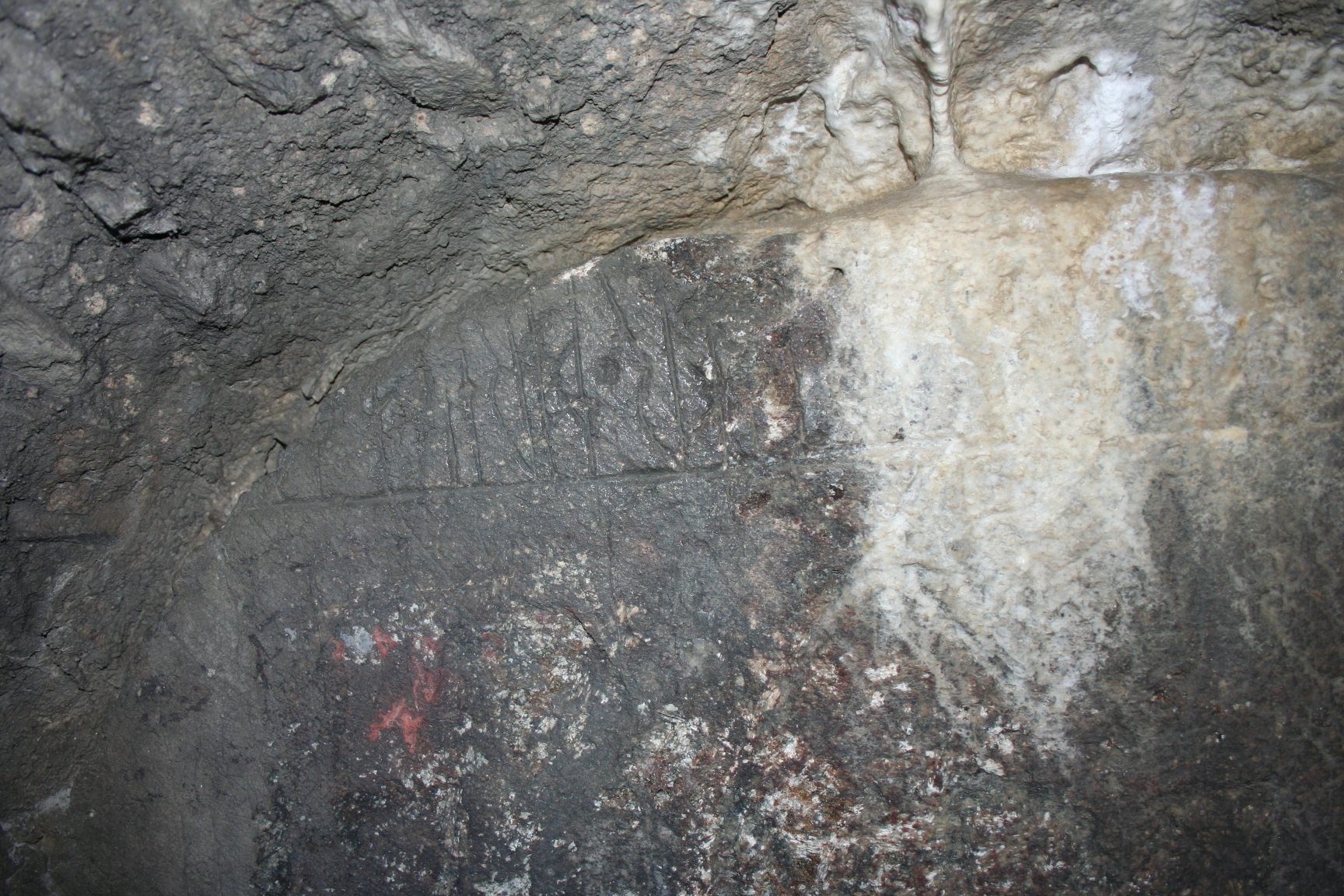
Runestone in the abbey tower

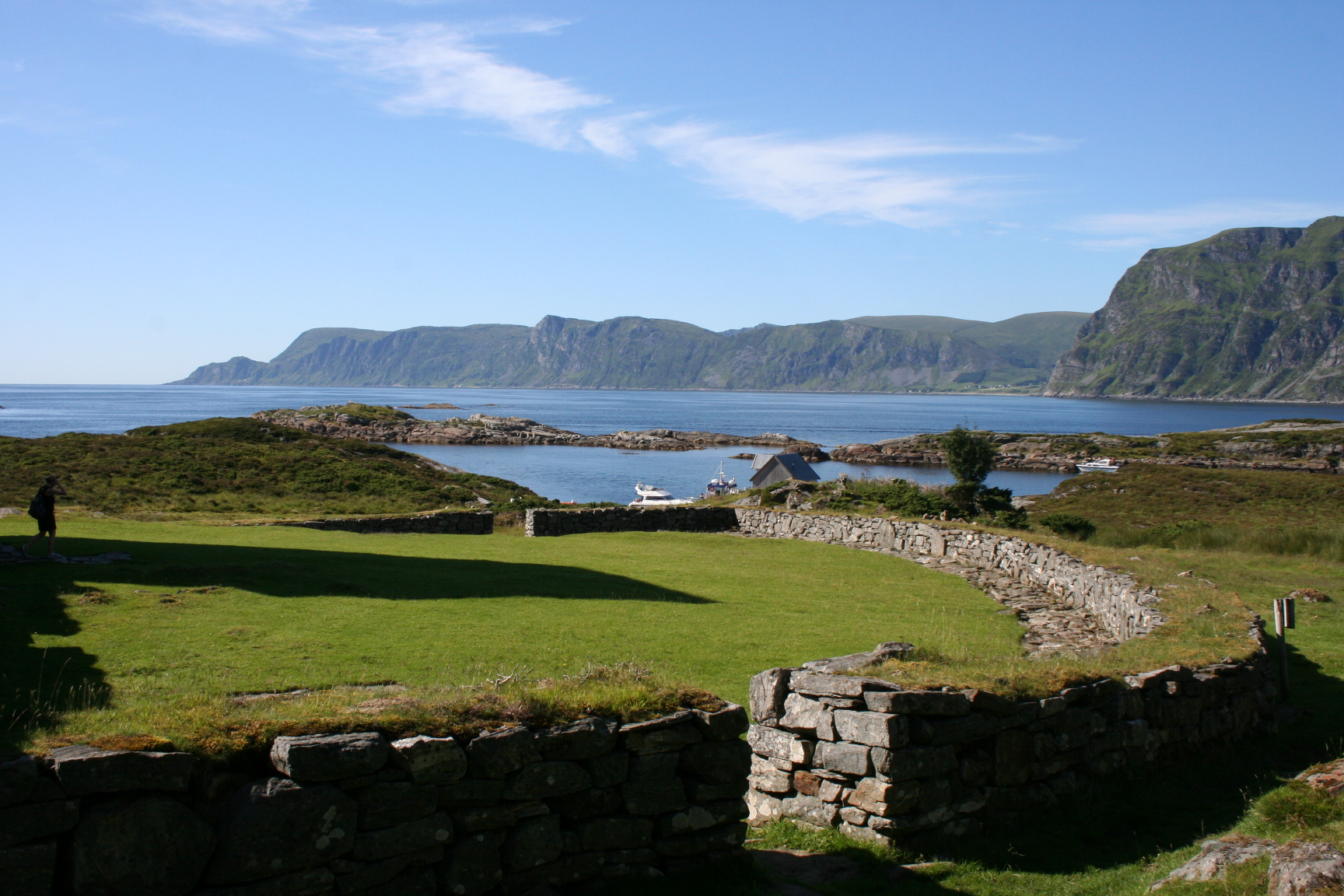
Church yard

== See also ==
- List of islands of Norway
