= Gil Antônio Moreira =

- Archbishop Emeritus of Juiz de Fora
- Church: Catholic Church
- Archdiocese: Archdiocese of Juiz de Fora
- In office: 28 January 2009 – 8 January 2026
- Predecessor: Eurico dos Santos Veloso
- Successor: Marco Aurélio Gubiotti
- Previous posts: Bishop of Jundiaí (2004-2009); Titular Bishop of Turris in Mauretania (1999-2004); Auxiliary Bishop of São Paulo (1999-2004)

Orders
- Ordination: 18 December 1976 by Cristiano Portela de Araújo Pena
- Consecration: 16 October 1999 by Alfio Rapisarda

Personal details
- Born: 9 October 1950 (age 75) Itapecerica, Minas Gerais, Brazil

Gil Antônio Moreira (Itapecerica, 9 October 1950) is the Archbishop of the Roman Catholic Archdiocese of Juiz de Fora, Minas Gerais state, Brazil, since 28 January 2009.

He is the national head of the Terço dos Homens (Men's Rosary) movement, according to the Brazilian Episcopal Conference (CNBB).
