= Cocos, Bahia =

Municipality of Bahia, Brazil

Coordinates: 14°11′02″S 44°32′02″W

Cocos (Bahia)
- Municipality
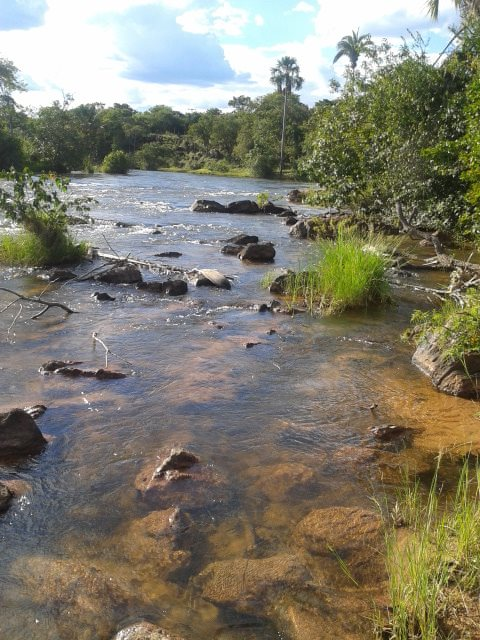

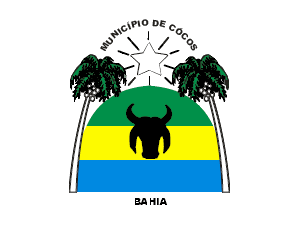
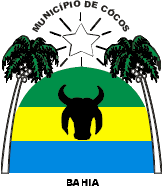
- Flag Coat of arms
- Interactive map of Cocos (Bahia)
- Country: Brazil
- Region: Nordeste
- State: Bahia

Population (2020)
  - Total: 18,807
- Time zone: UTC−3 (BRT)

Cocos (Bahia) is a municipality in the state of Bahia in the North-East region of Brazil.

== See also ==
- List of municipalities in Bahia
