= Archdiocese of Belo Horizonte =

Catholic ecclesiastical territory

Coordinates: 19.8833°S 43.9333°W

Archdiocese of Belo Horizonte Archidioecesis Bellohorizontinus Arquidiocese de Belo Horizonte
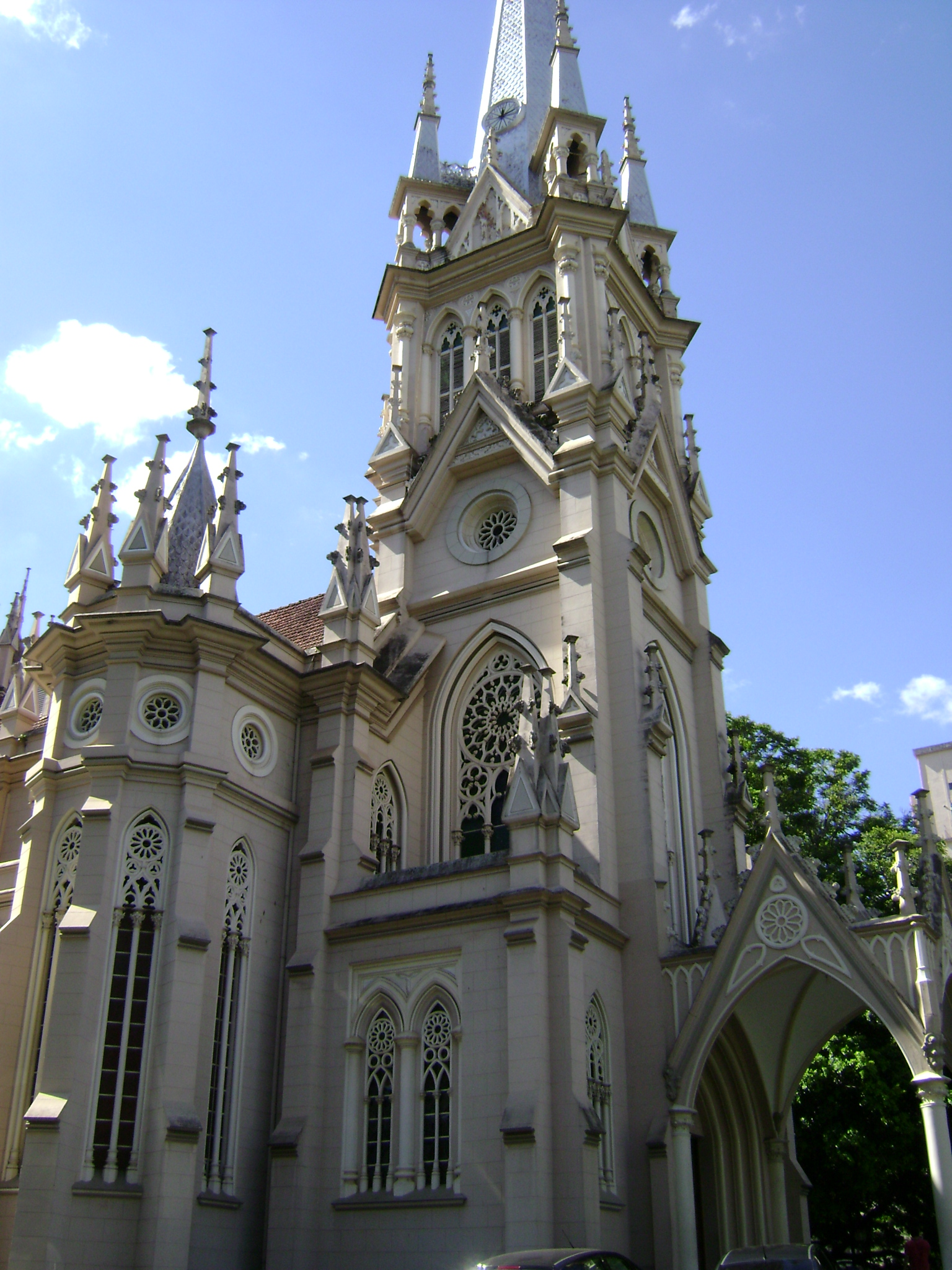
- Eucharistic Sanctuary of Our Lady of the Good Voyage, former cathedral church of the Archdiocese.

- Coat of arms

Location
- Country: Brazil
- Ecclesiastical province: Belo Horizonte

Statistics
- Area: 7,240 km^{2} (2,800 sq mi)
- Population: Total; Catholics: (as of 2012); 4,748,000; 3,324,000 (70%)

Information
- Rite: Latin Rite
- Established: 11 February 1921 (105 years ago)
- Cathedral: Christ the King Cathedral
- Patron saint: Our Lady of Piedade

Current leadership
- Pope: Leo XIV
- Metropolitan Archbishop: Walmor Oliveira de Azevedo
- Auxiliary Bishops: Joaquim Giovanni Mol Guimarães; Joel Maria dos Santos; Nivaldo dos Santos Ferreira; Edmar José da Silva

Website
- www.arquidiocesebh.org.br

The Roman Catholic Archdiocese of Belo Horizonte (Latin: Archidioecesis Bellohorizontinus) is a Latin Church ecclesiastical territory, or archdiocese, of the Catholic Church located in the state of Minas Gerais, Brazil's second-most populous state.

The seat of the Archdiocese of Belo Horizonte is the Our Lady of Good Voyage Cathedral (Portuguese: Catedral Nossa Senhora da Boa Viagem), also known as the Belo Horizonte Cathedral, in Belo Horizonte. This is only the temporary headquarters as there was already plans for a new cathedral dedicated to Christ the King in the early 20th century. That was delayed for decades, however, until the construction of the new cathedral, which commenced under the leadership of Archbishop Walmor Oliveira de Azevedo.

== History ==
- February 11, 1921: Established as Diocese of Belo Horizonte from the Metropolitan Archdiocese of Mariana.
- February 1, 1924: Promoted as Metropolitan Archdiocese of Belo Horizonte.

== Special churches ==
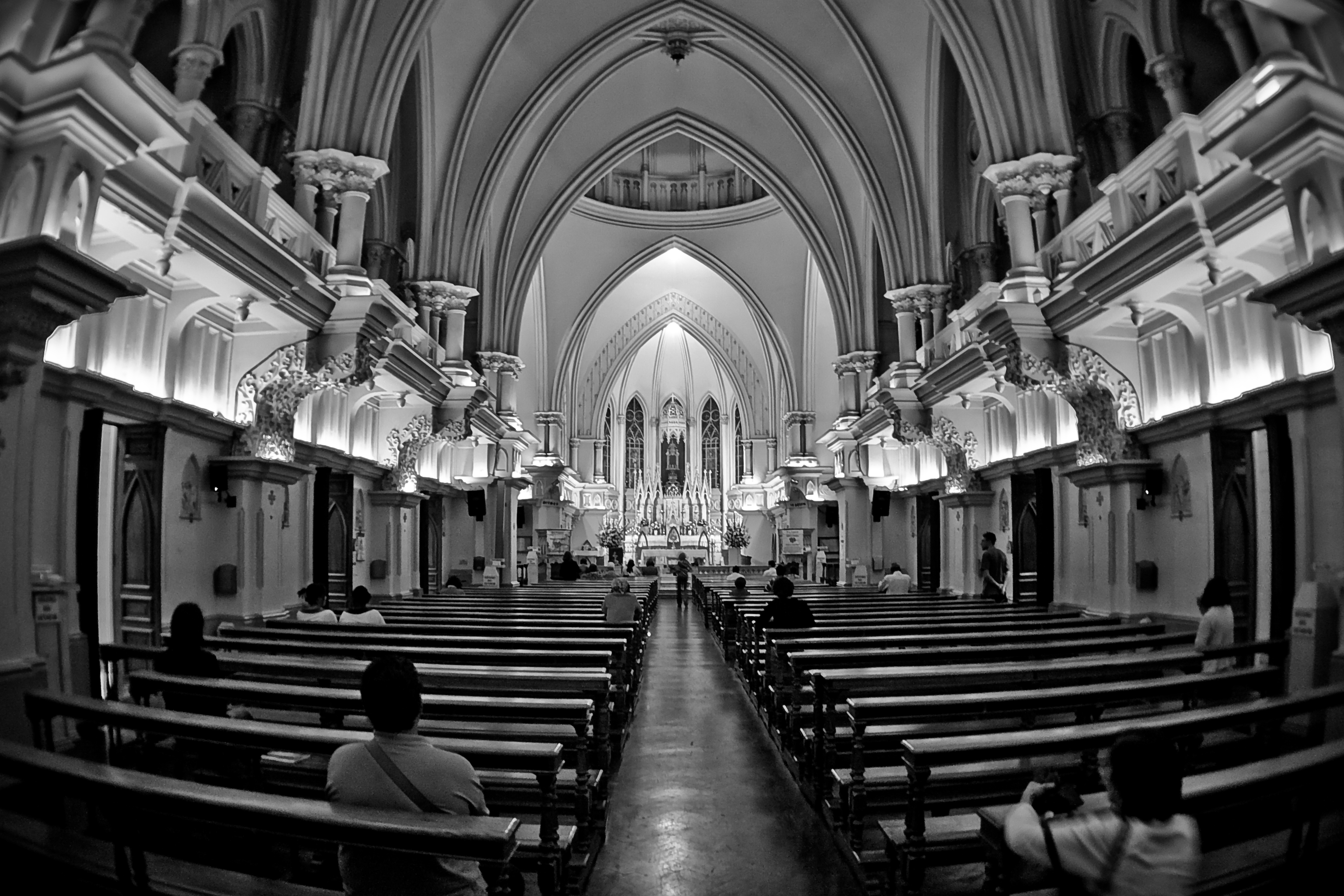
Interior of the Belo Horizonte Cathedral (Catedral da Boa Viagem)

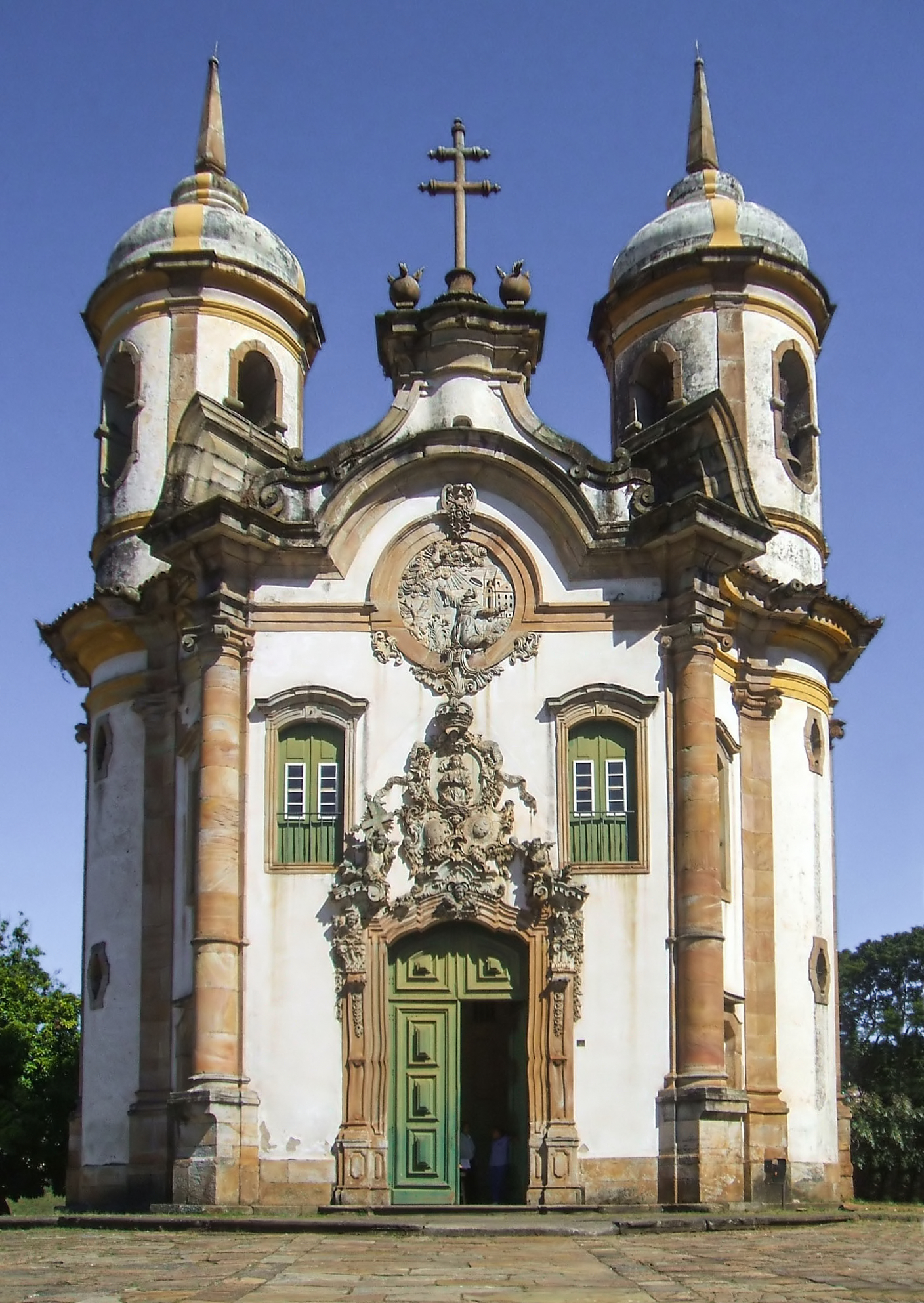
Igreja de São Francisco de Assis (Church of Saint Francis of Assisi) in Ouro Prêto

Minor Basilicas:

- Basílica de São João Maria Vianney.
- Basílica Nossa Senhora de Lourdes.
- Basílica Estadual Nossa Senhora da Piedade. (small church)
- Basílica Estadual das Romarias. (major church)
- Our Lady of Good Voyage Archdiocesan Sanctuary, Belo Horizonte
- Our Lady of Mercy Stadual Sanctuary

World Heritage Church: UNESCO World Heritage Site (as part of the Pampulha Modern Ensemble)

- Church of Saint Francis of Assisi, Pampulha

== Leadership ==
Bishops of Belo Horizonte: (Roman rite)

- Archbishop Antônio dos Santos Cabral (1921.11.21 – 1924.02.01)

Archbishops of Belo Horizonte: (Roman rite)

- Archbishop Antônio dos Santos Cabral (1924.02.01 – 1967.11.15)
- Archbishop João Resende Costa, S.D.B. (1967.11.15 – 1986.02.05)
- Cardinal Serafim Fernandes de Araújo (1986.02.05 – 2004.01.28)
- Archbishop Walmor Oliveira de Azevedo (2004.01.28 – present)

== Other affiliated bishops ==
=== Coadjutor archbishops ===
- Hugo Bressane de Araújo (1951–1954), did not succeed to the see; appointed Archbishop (Personal Title) of Marília, São Paulo
- João Resende (Rezende) Costa, S.D.B. (1957–1967)
- Serafim Fernandes de Araújo (1982–1986); future Cardinal

=== Auxiliary bishops ===
- Geraldo María de Morais Penido (1956-1957), appointed Coadjutor Bishop of Juiz de Fora
- Serafim Fernandes de Araújo (1959-1982), appointed Coadjutor here; future Cardinal
- José Dalvit, F.S.C.J. (1973-1977)
- Arnaldo Ribeiro (1975-1988), appointed Archbishop of Ribeirão Preto, São Paulo
- Werner Franz Siebenbrock, S.V.D. (1988-1994), appointed Bishop of Nova Iguaçu, Rio de Janeiro
- Sebastião Roque Rabelo Mendes (1989-2004)
- David Dias Pimentel (1996-2001), appointed Bishop of São João da Boa Vista, São Paulo
- Décio Sossai Zandonade, S.D.B. (1996-2003), appointed Bishop of Colatina, Espirito Santo
- Joaquim Giovanni Mol Guimarães (2006-
- Aloísio Jorge Pena Vitral (2006-2009), appointed Bishop of Teófilo Otoni, Minas Gerais
- Wilson Luís Angotti Filho (2011-2015), appointed Bishop of Taubaté, São Paulo
- Luis Gonzaga Féchio (2011-2016), appointed Bishop of Amparo, São Paulo
- João Justino de Medeiros Silva (2011-2017), appointed Coadjutor Archbishop of Montes Claros, Minas Gerais
- Edson José Oriolo dos Santos (2015-2019), appointed Bishop of Leopoldina, Minas Gerais
- Geovane Luís da Silva (2016-
- Otacilio Francisco Ferreira de Lacerda (2016-2019), appointed Bishop of Guanhães, Minas Gerais
- Vicente de Paula Ferreira, C.SS.R. (2017-
- Nivaldo dos Santos Ferreira (2020–)
- Júlio César Gomes Moreira (2020–2026)

=== Other priests of this diocese who became bishops ===
- Alexandre Gonçalves do Amaral, appointed Bishop of Uberaba in 1939
- Alberto Taveira Corrêa, appointed Auxiliary Bishop of Brasília, Distrito Federal in 1991

== Suffragan dioceses ==
- Diocese of Divinópolis
- Diocese of Luz
- Diocese of Oliveira
- Diocese of Sete Lagoas

== Sources ==
- GCatholic.org
- Diocese website
