= Clóvis Frainer =

Brazilian Roman Catholic archbishop

Clóvis Frainer OFMCap
- Archbishop of Juiz de Fora
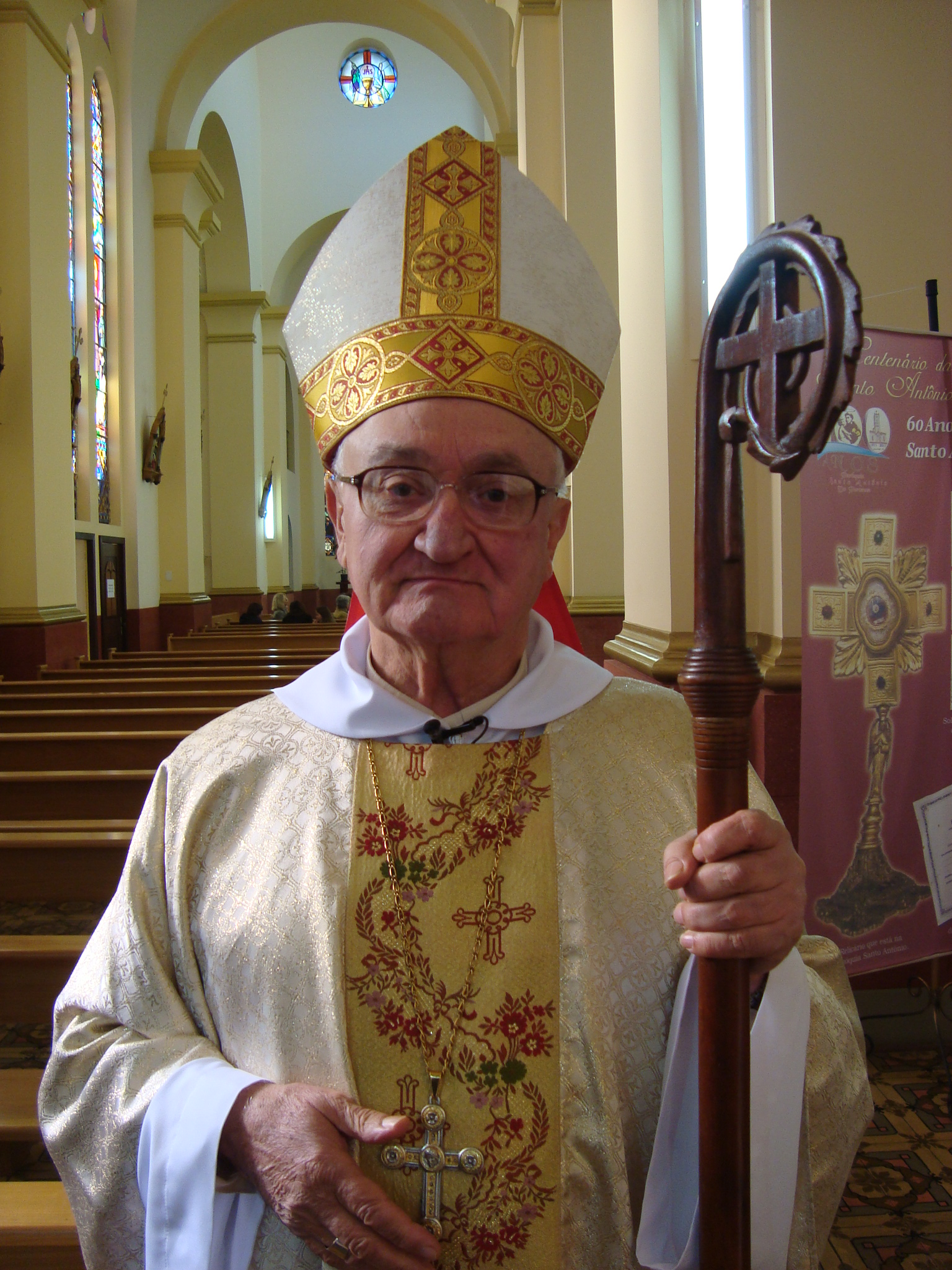
- Bishop Clóvis Frainer in 2011
- Church: Catholic Church
- Archdiocese: Archdiocese of Juiz de Fora
- In office: 22 May 1991 – 28 November 2001
- Predecessor: Juvenal Roriz
- Successor: Eurico dos Santos Veloso
- Previous posts: Archbishop of Manaus (1985-1991); Prelate of Coxim (1978-1985)

Orders
- Ordination: 27 March 1955 by Alfredo Scherer
- Consecration: 9 April 1978 by Carmine Rocco

Personal details
- Born: 23 March 1931 Veranópolis, São Pedro do Rio Grande do Sul, Republic of the United States of Brazil
- Died: 4 April 2017 (aged 86) Caxias do Sul, Rio Grande do Sul, Brazil

Clóvis Frainer OFMCap (23 March 1931 – 4 April 2017) was a Roman Catholic archbishop of Manaus and Juiz de Fora.

== Life ==
Frainer was born in Veranópolis, Brazil, in March 1931. He entered the Order of Friars Minor Capuchin and was ordained a priest by the Archbishop of Porto Alegre, Alfredo Vicente Scherer, on 27 March 1955. Pope Paul VI appointed Frainer on 3 January 1978 the first prelate of the territorial prelature of Coxim, which was established on the same date. The apostolic nuncio in Brazil, Archbishop Carmine Rocco, consecrated Frainer as a bishop on 9 April of the same year; Co-consecrators were Benedito Zorzi, Bishop of Caxias do Sul, and Antônio Barbosa SDB, bishop of Campo Grande. Frainer's motto as a bishop was Evangelisare misit me ("He sent me to evangelize").

On 5 January 1985, Frainer was appointed archbishop of Archdiocese of Manaus by Pope John Paul II and on 22 May 1991, Frainer was appointed archbishop of Archdiocese of Juiz de Fora. On 28 November 2001, John Paul II accepted his resignation for health reasons.

== See also ==
- Catholic Church in Brazil
