= Archdiocese of Santa Maria =

Catholic ecclesiastical territory

Coordinates: 29.6849°S 53.8080°W

Archdiocese of Santa Maria Archidioecesis Sanctae Mariae

Catholic
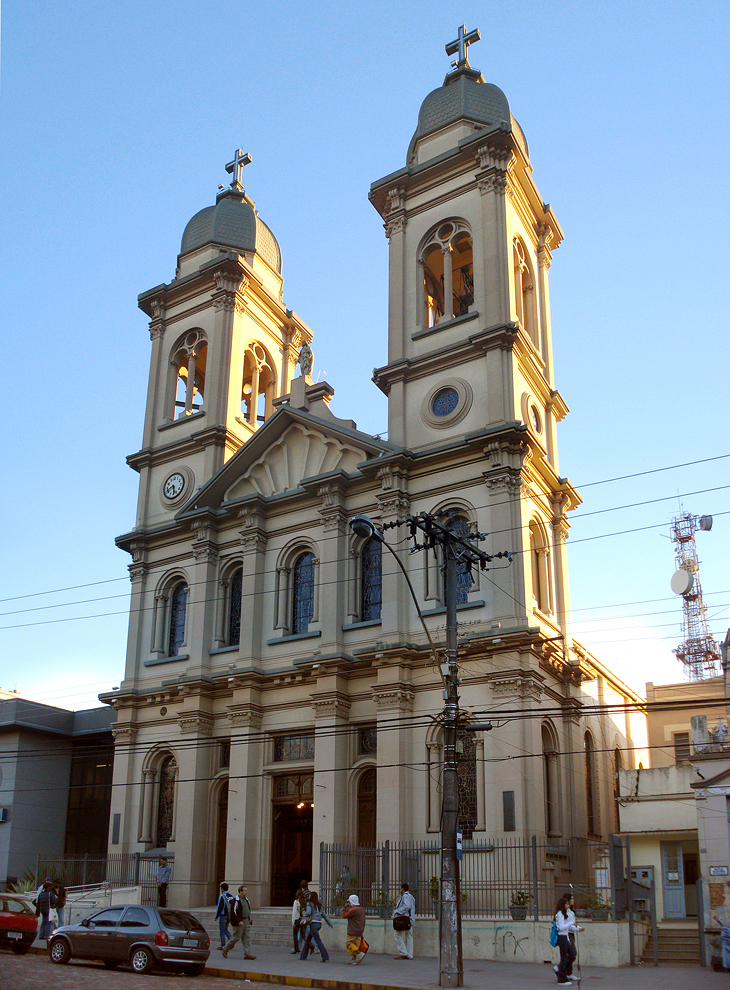
- Cathedral of the Immaculate Conception

- Coat of arms

Location
- Country: Brazil
- Ecclesiastical province: Santa Maria

Statistics
- Area: 18,866 km^{2} (7,284 sq mi)
- Population: Total; Catholics: (as of 2004); 488,258; 382,247 (78.3%)

Information
- Rite: Latin Rite
- Established: 15 August 1910 (116 years ago)
- Cathedral: Cathedral of the Immaculate Conception

Current leadership
- Pope: Leo XIV
- Archbishop: Leomar Antônio Brustolin
- Bishops emeritus: Hélio Adelar Rubert

Website
- www.arquism.com

The Roman Catholic Archdiocese of Santa Maria (Latin: Archdioecesis Sanctae Mariae) is an archdiocese located in the city of Santa Maria. Before being elevated to an archdiocese itself in 2011 it was part of the ecclesiastical province of Porto Alegre in Brazil.

== History ==
- 15 August 1910: Established as Diocese of Santa Maria from the Diocese of São Pedro do Rio Grande
- 13 April 2011: Elevated to archdiocese

== Special churches ==
- Basílica Santuário Nossa Senhora Medianeira, minor basilica

== Leadership ==
Bishops of Santa Maria

- Miguel de Lima Valverde (6 February 1911 – 10 February 1922)
- Ático Eusébio da Rocha (27 October 1922 – 17 December 1928)
- Antônio Reis (31 July 1931 – 14 September 1960)
- Luís Victor Sartori (14 September 1960 – 10 April 1970)
  - Coadjutor bishop 1956–60
- Érico Ferrari (29 April 1971 – 29 April 1973)
- José Ivo Lorscheiter (5 February 1974 – 24 March 2004)
- Hélio Adelar Rubert (24 March 2004 – 13 April 2011)

Archbishops of Santa Maria

- Hélio Adelar Rubert (13 April 2011 — present)

Auxiliary bishops

- João Cláudio Colling (1949–1951), appointed Bishop of Passo Fundo, Rio Grande do Sul
- Walmor Battú Wichrowski (1961–1965), resigned; appointed Bishop of Cruz Alta, Rio Grande do Sul in 1971
- Antônio do Carmo Cheuiche, OCD (1969–1971), appointed Auxiliary Bishop of Porto Alegre, Rio Grande do Sul

Other priests of this diocese who became bishops

- Edson Taschetto (Tasquetto) Damian, appointed Bishop of São Gabriel da Cachoeira, Amazonas in 2009
- José Mário Scalon Angonese, appointed Auxiliary Bishop of Curitiba, Parana in 2013

== Suffragan Sees ==
- Diocese of Cachoeira do Sul
- Diocese of Cruz Alta
- Diocese of Santa Cruz do Sul
- Diocese of Santo Ângelo
- Diocese of Uruguaiana
