= Diocese of Luz =

Catholic ecclesiastical territory

Diocese of Luz Dioecesis Luceatinus Diocese de Luz
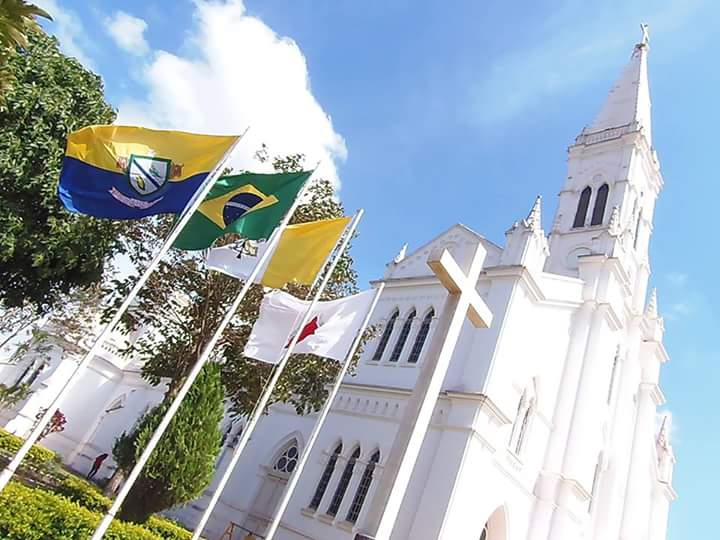
- Catedral Nossa Senhora da Luz

Location
- Country: Brazil
- Ecclesiastical province: Belo Horizonte
- Metropolitan: Belo Horizonte

Statistics
- Area: 32,976 km^{2} (12,732 sq mi)
- Population: Total; Catholics: (as of 2004); 441,000; 352,800 (80.0%)

Information
- Rite: Latin Rite
- Established: 18 July 1918 (107 years ago)
- Cathedral: Cathedral of Our Lady of Luz in Luz

Current leadership
- Pope: Leo XIV
- Bishop: José Aristeu Vieira
- Metropolitan Archbishop: Walmor Oliveira de Azevedo

Website
- Website of the Diocese

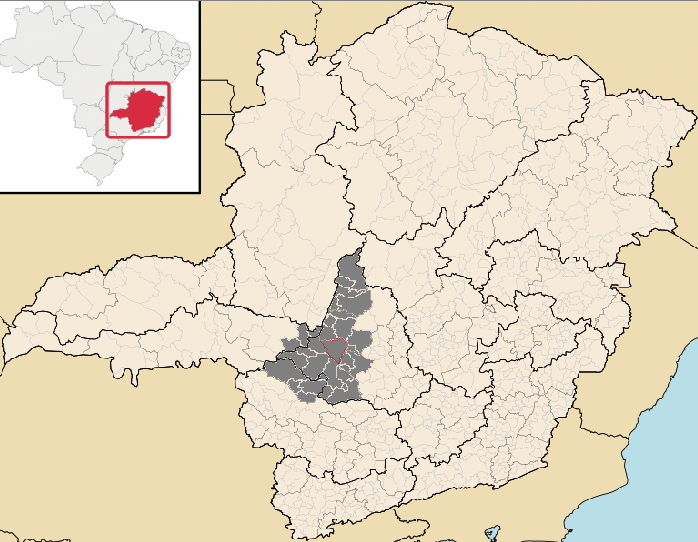
Roman Catholic Diocese of Luz.

The Roman Catholic Diocese of Luz (Latin: Dioecesis Luceatinus) is a diocese located in the city of Luz in the ecclesiastical province of Belo Horizonte in Brazil.

== History ==
- July 18, 1918: Established as Diocese of Aterrado from the Metropolitan Archdiocese of Mariana and Diocese of Uberaba
- December 5, 1960: Renamed as Diocese of Luz

== Bishops ==
- Bishops of Luz (Roman rite), in reverse chronological order
  - Bishop José Aristeu Vieira (2015.02.25 - )
  - Bishop Antonio Carlos Félix (2003.02.05 – 2014.03.06), appointed Bishop of Governador Valadares, Minas Gerais
  - Bishop Eurico dos Santos Veloso (1994.05.18 – 2001.11.28), appointed Archbishop of Juiz de Fora, Minas Gerais
  - Bishop Belchior Joaquim da Silva Neto, C.M. (1967.07.09 – 1994.05.18)
  - Bishop Manoel Nunes Coelho (1960.12.05 – 1967.07.08)
- Bishops of Aterrado (Roman Rite)
  - Bishop Manoel Nunes Coelho (1920.06.10 – 1960.12.05)

=== Coadjutor bishops ===
- Belchior Joaquim da Silva Neto, C.M. † (1960-1967)
- Eurico dos Santos Veloso (1991-2004)

== Sources ==
- GCatholic.org
- Catholic Hierarchy
- Diocese website
