= Archdiocese of Juiz de Fora =

Catholic ecclesiastical territory

Coordinates: 21.7639°S 43.3498°W

Archdiocese of Juiz de Fora Archidioecesis Iudiciforensis

Catholic
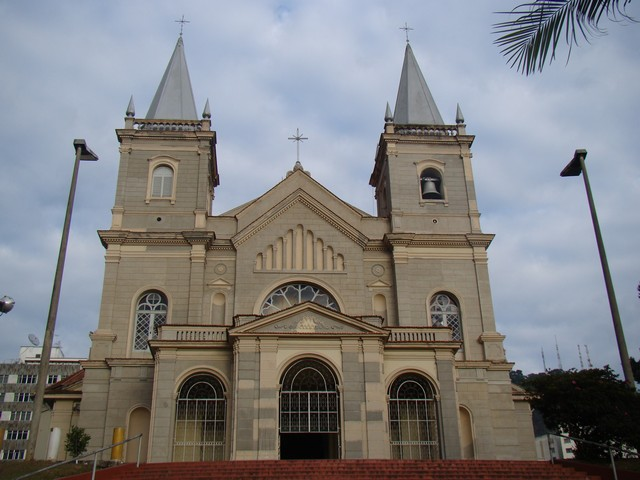
- Metropolitan Cathedral of St. Anthony

- Coat of arms

Location
- Country: Brazil

Statistics
- Area: 10,757 km^{2} (4,153 sq mi)
- Population: Total; Catholics: (as of 2006); 676,000; 540,000 (79.9%)

Information
- Denomination: Catholic Church
- Rite: Latin Rite
- Established: 1 February 1924 (102 years ago)
- Cathedral: Catedral Metropolitana Santo Antônio

Current leadership
- Pope: Leo XIV
- Archbishop: Marco Aurélio Gubiotti
- Bishops emeritus: Gil Antônio Moreira

Website
- www.arquidiocesejuizdefora.org.br

The Roman Catholic Archdiocese of Juiz de Fora (Latin: Archidioecesis Iudiciforensis) is an archdiocese located in the city of Juiz de Fora in Brazil.

== History ==
- February 1, 1924: Established as Diocese of Juiz de Fora from the Metropolitan Archdiocese of Mariana
- April 14, 1962: Promoted as Metropolitan Archdiocese of Juiz de Fora

== Bishops ==
=== Ordinaries, in reverse chronological order ===
- Archbishops of Juiz de Fora (Roman rite)
  - Archbishop Marco Aurélio Gubiotti (2026.01.08 – Present)
  - Archbishop Gil Antônio Moreira (2009.01.28 – 2026.01.08)
  - Archbishop Eurico dos Santos Veloso (2001.11.28 – 2009.01.28)
  - Archbishop Clóvis Frainer, O.F.M. Cap. (1991.05.22 – 2001.11.28)
  - Archbishop Juvenal Roriz, C.Ss.R. (1978.05.05 – 1990.02.07)
  - Archbishop Geraldo María de Morais Penido (1962.04.14 – 1977.12.01), appointed Coadjutor Archbishop of Aparecida, São Paulo
- Bishops of Juiz de Fora (Roman Rite)
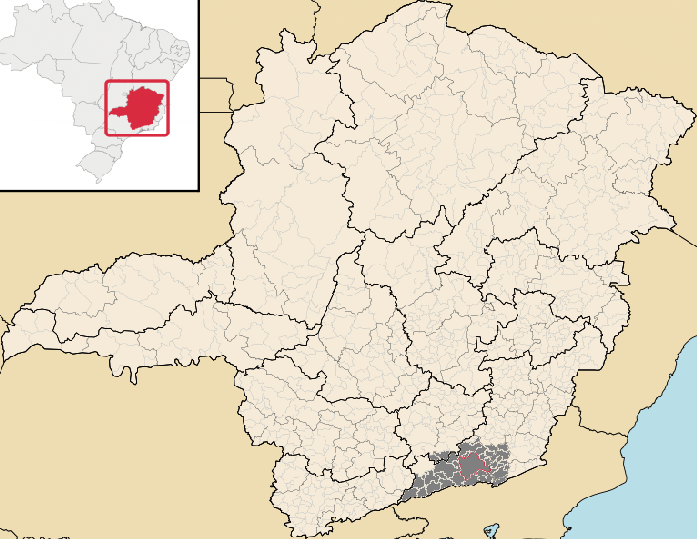
  - Archdiocese of Juiz de Fora.
    Bishop Geraldo María de Morais Penido (later Archbishop) (1958.06.09 – 1962.04.14)
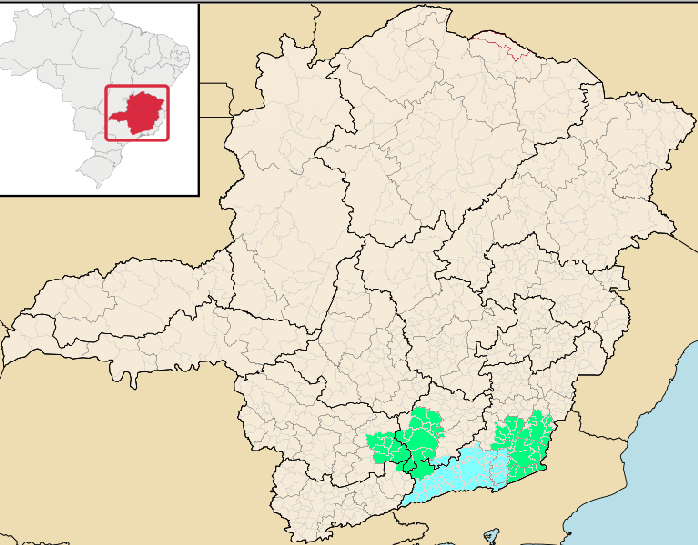
  - Ecclesiastical Province of Juiz de Fora.
    Bishop Justino José de Sant'Ana (1924.07.04 – 1958.06.09)

=== Coadjutor bishop ===
- Geraldo María de Morais Penido (1957-1958)

=== Auxiliary bishops ===
- Othon Motta (1953-1955), appointed Auxiliary Bishop of São Sebastião do Rio de Janeiro
- Altivo Pacheco Ribeiro (1973-1987)
- Eurico dos Santos Veloso (1987-1991), appointed Coadjutor Bishop of Luz, Minas Gerais (later returned here as Archbishop)
- Paulo Francisco Machado (2004-2008), appointed Bishop of Uberlândia, Minas Gerais

=== Other priests of this diocese who became bishops ===
- José Eugênio Corrêa, appointed Bishop of Caratinga, Minas Gerais in 1957
- Walmor Oliveira de Azevedo, appointed Auxiliary Bishop of São Salvador da Bahia in 1998
- Eduardo Benes de Sales Rodrigues, appointed Auxiliary Bishop of Porto Alegre, Rio Grande do Sul in 1998
- João Justino de Medeiros Silva, appointed Auxiliary Bishop of Belo Horizonte, Minas Gerais in 2011
- Roberto José da Silva, appointed Bishop of Janaúba, Minas Gerais in 2019

== Suffragan dioceses ==
- Diocese of Leopoldina
- Diocese of São João del Rei

== Sources ==
- GCatholic.org
- Catholic Hierarchy
- Archdiocese website (Portuguese)
