= Thadeu Gomes Canellas =

Brazilian Roman Catholic bishop (1930–2026)

The Most Reverend Thadeu Gomes Canellas
- Bishop of Osório
- Church: Roman Catholic Church
- Archdiocese: Porto Alegre
- Diocese: Osório
- Appointed: 10 November 1999
- Term ended: 15 November 2006
- Predecessor: None (diocese established)
- Successor: Jaime Pedro Kohl
- Other posts: Titular bishop of Iunca in Byzacena; Auxiliary Bishop of Porto Alegre (1983–1999)

Orders
- Ordination: 25 February 1956
- Consecration: 25 February 1984 by João Cláudio Colling, Alfredo Scherer, Edmundo Luís Kunz

Personal details
- Born: 28 July 1930 Gravataí, Rio Grande do Sul, Brazil
- Died: 20 January 2026 (aged 95) Osório, Rio Grande do Sul, Brazil
- Motto: Ut testimonium perhiberet

Thadeu Gomes Canellas (28 July 1930 – 20 January 2026) was a Brazilian Roman Catholic bishop who served as the first bishop of the Roman Catholic Diocese of Osório from its establishment in 1999 until his retirement in 2006. Prior to this he was auxiliary bishop of the Roman Catholic Archdiocese of Porto Alegre for sixteen years.

== Early life and education ==
Thadeu Gomes Canellas was born on 28 July 1930 in Gravataí, Rio Grande do Sul, Brazil. He pursued ecclesiastical studies in philosophy and theology and completed his priestly formation in Rome. He was ordained to the priesthood on 25 February 1956.

After his ordination, he returned to Brazil, where he engaged in pastoral ministry and diocesan administration within the Archdiocese of Porto Alegre.

== Priestly ministry ==
As a priest, Canellas served in parish ministry and held several leadership roles in pastoral formation. He worked in catechetical and youth apostolate programs and contributed to the organization of diocesan pastoral initiatives. His work emphasized evangelization, catechesis, and strengthening parish structures.

== Episcopal ministry ==
=== Auxiliary Bishop of Porto Alegre ===
On 19 November 1983, Canellas was appointed Titular Bishop of Iunca in Byzacena and Auxiliary Bishop of Porto Alegre by Pope John Paul II. He received episcopal consecration on 25 February 1984.

As auxiliary bishop, he assisted the archbishop in pastoral governance, clergy formation, and diocesan administration. He participated in regional and national meetings of the National Conference of Bishops of Brazil (CNBB).

=== Bishop of Osório ===
With the establishment of the Roman Catholic Diocese of Osório on 10 November 1999, Canellas was appointed its first diocesan bishop.

During his episcopate, he was responsible for organizing the new diocese's administrative and pastoral structures, including the diocesan curia, presbyteral council, and pastoral programs. His leadership focused on strengthening parish life, promoting vocations, and consolidating the diocesan identity in the northern coastal region of Rio Grande do Sul.

== Retirement ==
Upon reaching the canonical age of retirement, Canellas submitted his resignation, which was accepted by Pope Benedict XVI on 15 November 2006. He was succeeded by Bishop Jaime Pedro Kohl.

Following his retirement, he continued to reside in Osório, maintaining a presence in the local Catholic community as bishop emeritus.

== Death ==
Canellas died on 20 January 2026, at the age of 95. His death was announced by the National Conference of Bishops of Brazil (CNBB), which highlighted his decades of pastoral service and his foundational role in the Diocese of Osório.

== See also ==
- Catholic Church in Brazil

Catholic Church titles
Preceded by Position established	Bishop of Osório; 1999–2006	Succeeded by Jaime Pedro Kohl
Preceded by Vital João Geraldo Wilderink	Titular Bishop of Iunca in Byzacena; 1983–1999	Succeeded by Manuel Parrado Carral
Preceded by —	Auxiliary Bishop of Porto Alegre; 1983–1999	Succeeded by —
