= Remídio José Bohn =

Brazilian Roman Catholic bishop (1950–2018)

- Bishop of Cachoeira do Sul
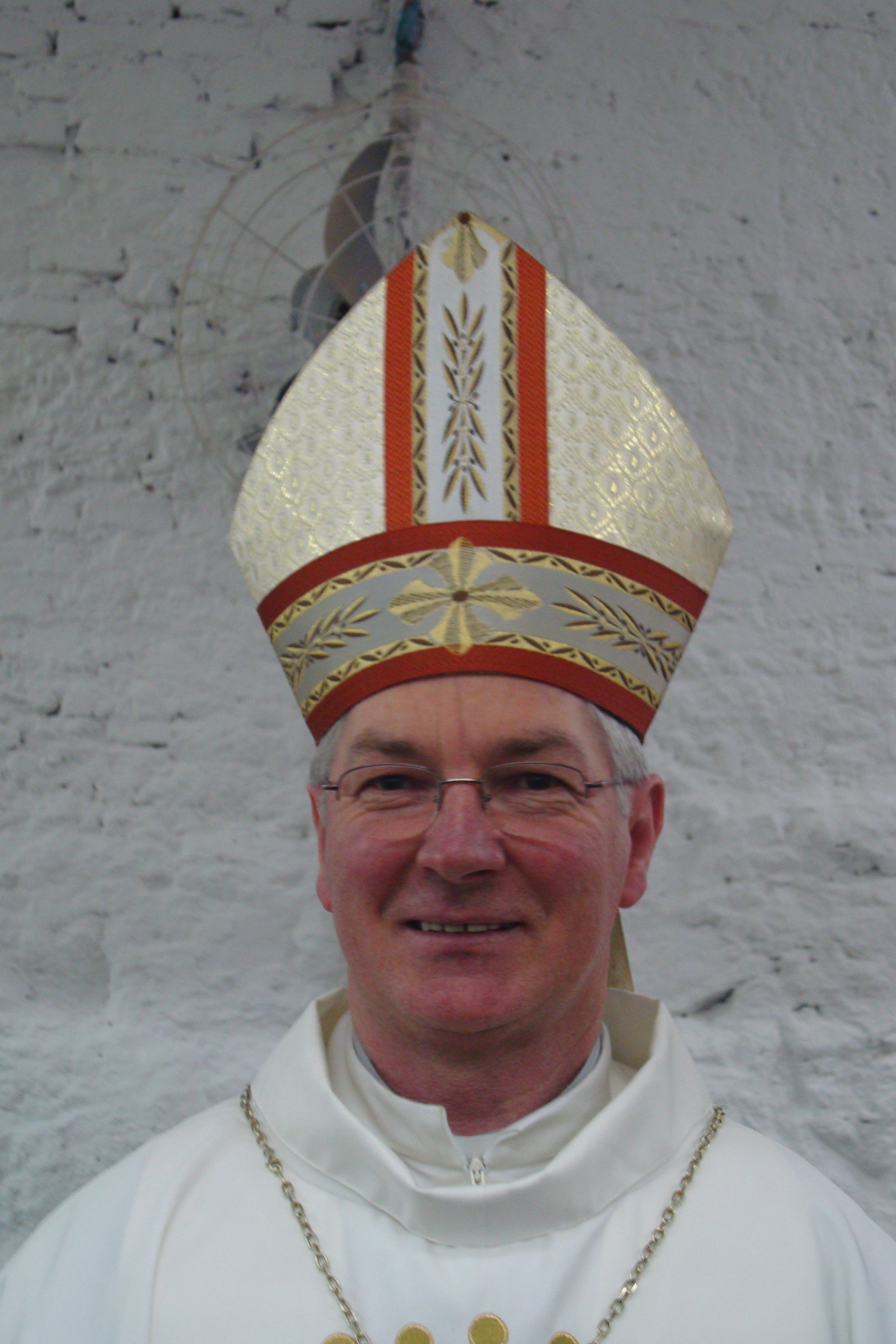
- Church: Catholic Church
- Diocese: Diocese of Cachoeira do Sul
- In office: 28 December 2011 – 6 January 2018
- Predecessor: Irineu Sílvio Wilges
- Successor: Edson Batista de Mello
- Previous posts: Titular Bishop of Uchi Maius (2006-2011); Auxiliary Bishop of Porto Alegre (2006-2011)

Orders
- Ordination: 29 November 1975 by Alfredo Scherer
- Consecration: 17 March 2006 by Dadeus Grings

Personal details
- Born: 21 May 1950 Feliz, Rio Grande do Sul, United States of Brazil
- Died: 6 January 2018 (aged 67)

Remídio José Bohn (21 May 1950 – 6 January 2018) was a Roman Catholic bishop.

Bohn was ordained to the priesthood in 1975. He served as auxiliary bishop for the Archdiocese of Porto Alegre, Brazil from 2006 to 2011. He then served as bishop of the Diocese of Cachoeira do Sul, Brazil from 2011 until his death.
