= Diocese of Osório =

Catholic ecclesiastical territory

Diocese of Osório Dioecesis Osoriena

Catholic
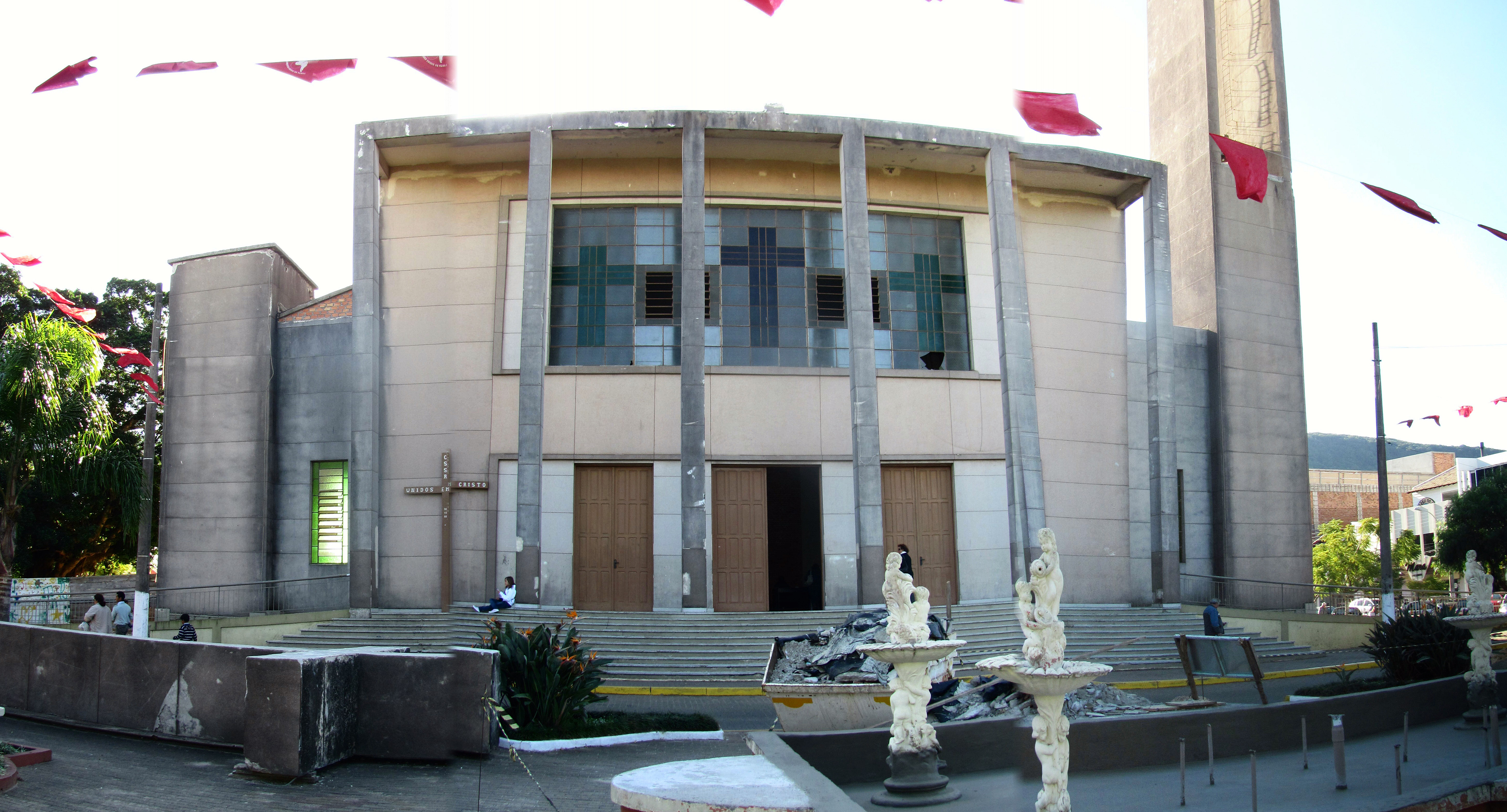
- Cathedral of Nossa Senhora da Conceição in Osório

Location
- Country: Brazil
- Ecclesiastical province: Porto Alegre

Statistics
- Area: 6,210 km^{2} (2,400 sq mi)
- Population: Total; Catholics: (as of 2004); 269,186; 226,547 (84.2%)

Information
- Rite: Latin Rite
- Established: 10 November 1999 (26 years ago)
- Cathedral: Catedral Nossa Senhora da Conceição

Current leadership
- Pope: Leo XIV
- Bishop: Jaime Pedro Kohl, P.S.D.P.
- Metropolitan Archbishop: Jaime Spengler

Website
- www.diocesedeosorio.org

The Roman Catholic Diocese of Osório (Latin: Dioecesis Osoriena) is a diocese located in the city of Osório in the ecclesiastical province of Porto Alegre in Brazil.

== History ==
- 10 November 1999: Established as Diocese of Osório from the Diocese of Caxias do Sul and Metropolitan Archdiocese of Porto Alegre

== Leadership ==
- Bishops of Osório (Roman rite)
  - Bishop Thadeu Gomes Canellas (1999.11.10 – 2006.11.15)
  - Bishop Jaime Pedro Kohl, P.S.D.P. (2006.11.15 – present)
