= Antonio Zattera =

Brazilian Roman Catholic prelate (1899–1987)

His Excellency Antonio Zattera
- Bishop Emeritus of Pelotas
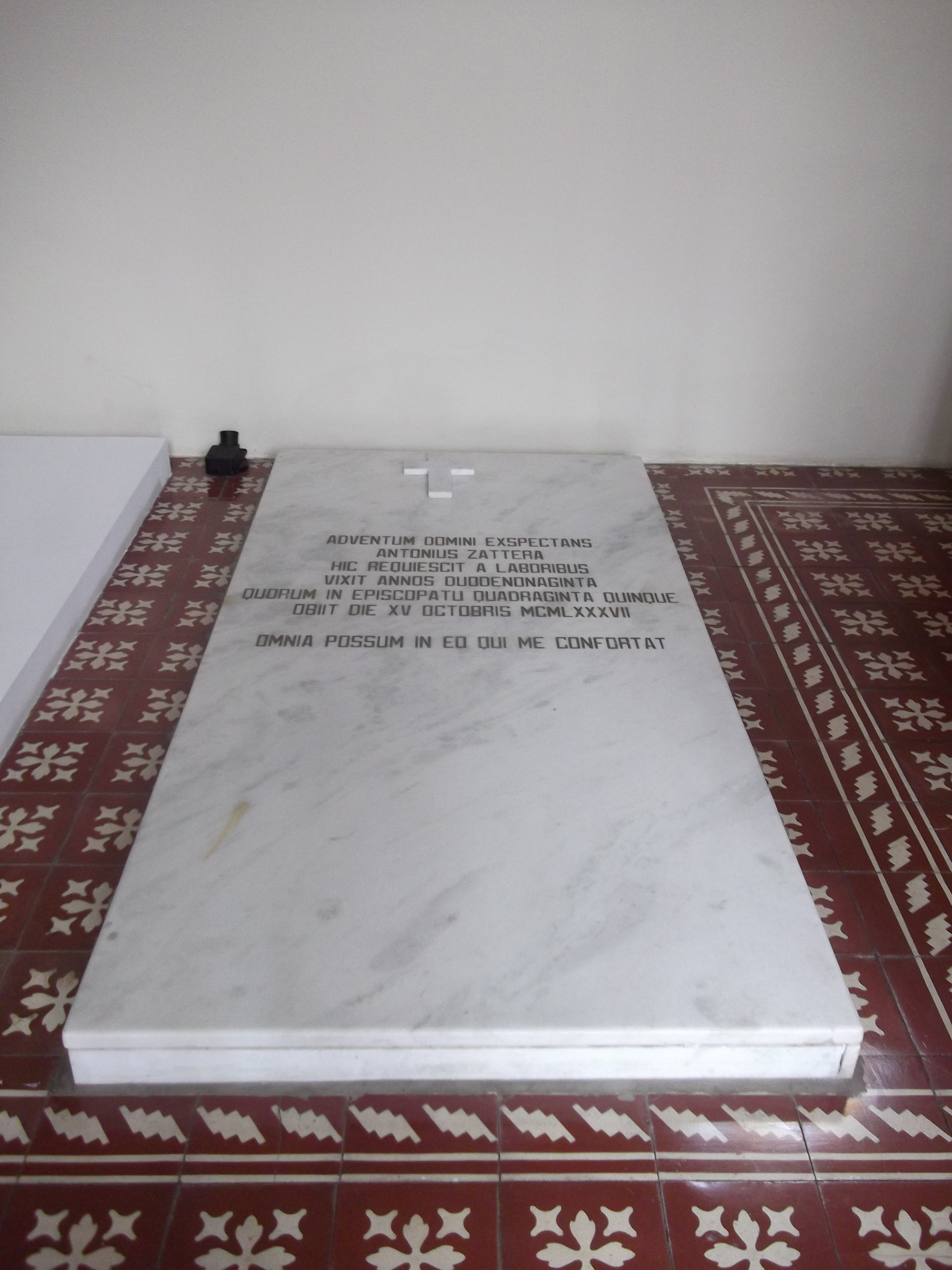
- Native name: Antônio Zattera
- Archdiocese: Porto Alegre
- Diocese: Pelotas
- Installed: 31 January 1942
- Term ended: 1 September 1977
- Predecessor: Ioachimus Ferreira de Melo
- Successor: Jayme Chemello

Orders
- Ordination: 12 August 1923 by Ático Eusébio da Rocha
- Consecration: 31 May 1942 by João Batista Becker

Personal details
- Born: 25 June 1899 Garibaldi, Rio Grande do Sul
- Died: 15 October 1987 (aged 88) Pelotas, Rio Grande do Sul, Brazil
- Motto: Omnia possum in eo qui me confortat
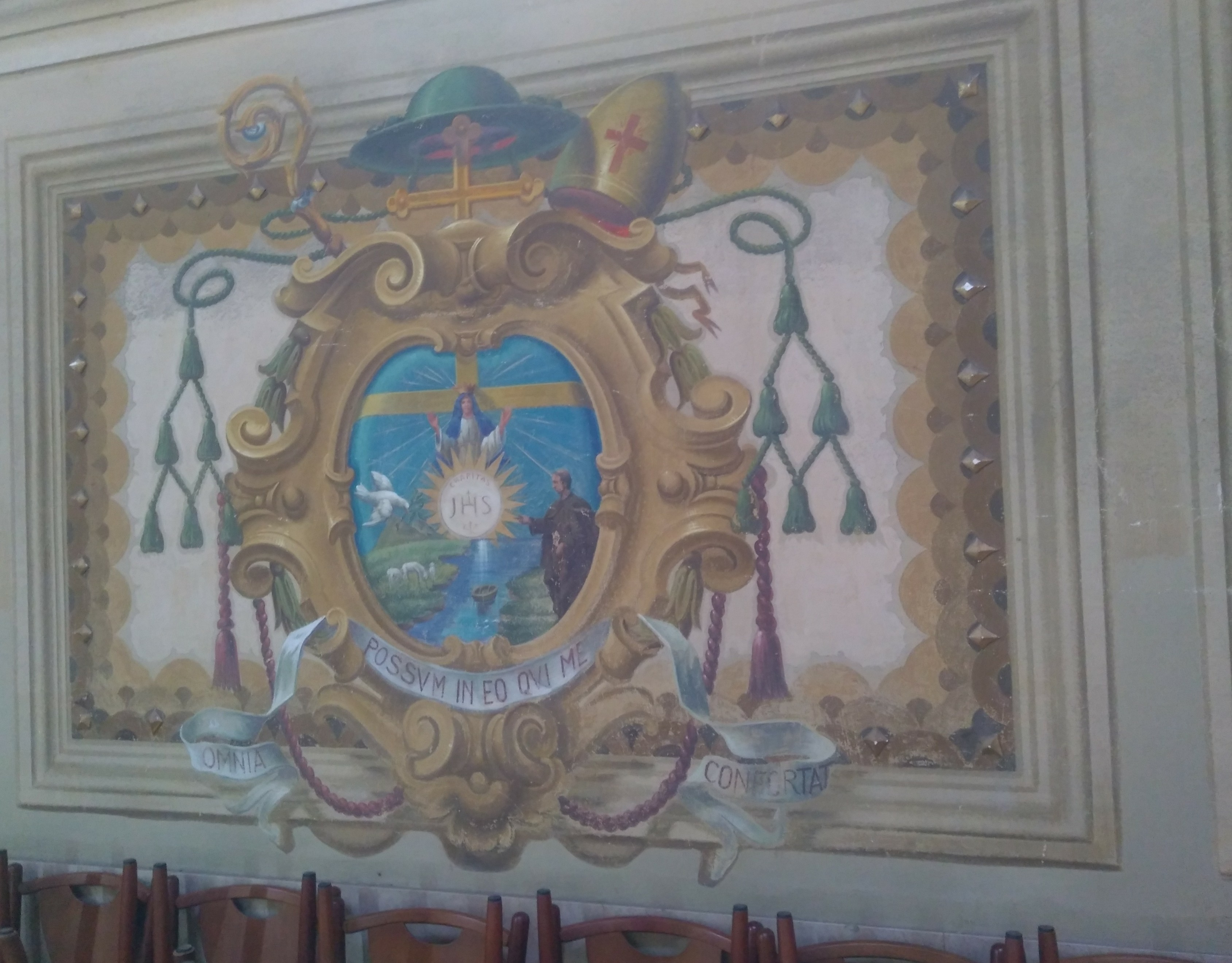
- Coat of arms

Antonio Zattera (25 June 1899 – 15 October 1987) was a Brazilian Roman Catholic prelate. He was appointed bishop of Pelotas in 1942. He died in Pelotas on 15 October 1987 at the age of 88.

Catholic Church titles
Preceded by Ioachimus Ferreira de Melo	Bishop of Pelotas; 1942–1977	Succeeded by Jayme Chemello
