= Diocese of Montenegro =

Catholic ecclesiastical territory

Diocese of Montenegro Dioecesis Nigromontana

Catholic
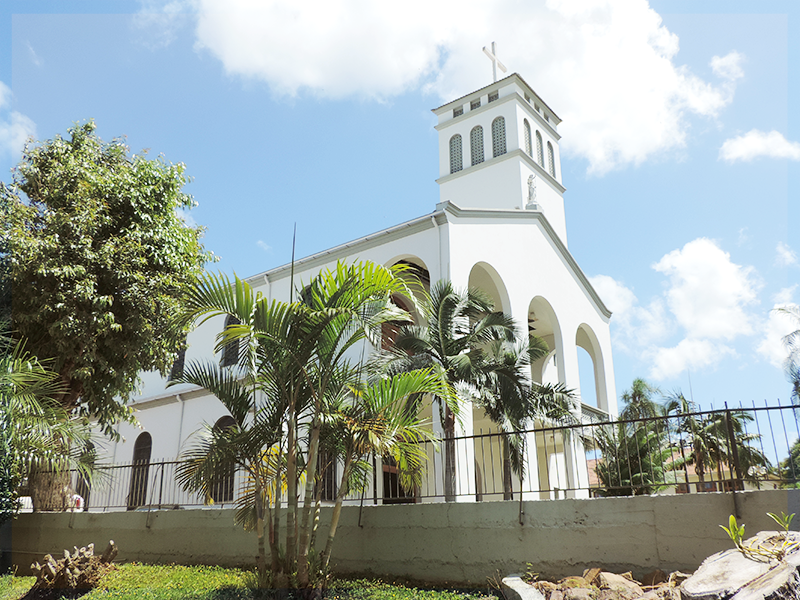
- Catedral de São João Batista in 2018

Location
- Country: Brazil
- Ecclesiastical province: Porto Alegre

Statistics
- Area: 4,395 km^{2} (1,697 sq mi)
- Population: Total; Catholics: (as of 2010); 340,000; 283,119 (83.3%)

Information
- Rite: Latin Rite
- Established: 2 July 2008 (18 years ago)
- Cathedral: Catedral de São João Batista

Current leadership
- Pope: Leo XIV
- Bishop: Carlos Rômulo Gonçalves e Silva
- Metropolitan Archbishop: Jaime Spengler
- Bishops emeritus: Paulo Antônio de Conto

Website
- www.diocesemontenegro.com.br

The Roman Catholic Diocese of Montenegro (Latin: Dioecesis Nigromontana) is a suffragan Latin diocese in the ecclesiastical province of its mother see, the Metropolitan Archdiocese of Porto Alegre (in the state capital) in Rio Grande do Sul state, southernmost Brazil.

Its cathedral episcopal see is Catedral de São João Batista, dedicated to John the Baptist in the city of Montenegro, Brazil.

== Statistics ==
As per 2014, it pastorally served 285,590 Catholics (76.0% of 375,589 total) on 4,385 km^{2} in 30 parishes with 49 priests (39 diocesan, 10 religious), 4 deacons, 148 lay religious (24 brothers, 124 sisters) and 18 seminarians.

== History ==
The diocese was erected by Pope Benedict XVI on 2 July 2008, on territory split off from its Metropolitan see, the Archdiocese of Porto Alegre.

== Bishops ==
=== Episcopal ordinaries ===
- Paulo Antônio de Conto (born Brazil) (2 July 2008 - 18 October 2017), also Apostolic Administrator of Passo Fundo (Brazil) (2015.07.15 – 2015.12.02); previously Bishop of São Luíz de Caceres (Brazil) (1991.07.24 – 1998.05.27), Bishop of Criciúma (Brazil) (1998.05.27 – 2008.07.02)
- Carlos Rômulo Gonçalves e Silva (18 October 2017 - ...); previously Coadjutor Bishop (2017.03.22 – 2017.10.18), neither previous prelature nor titular see.

=== Coadjutor bishop ===
- Carlos Rômulo Gonçalves e Silva (2017)

== See also ==
- List of Catholic dioceses in Brazil

== Sources and external links ==
- GCatholic, with Google map & satellite photo - data for all sections
