= Chemello =

Chemello is a surname. Notable people with the surname include:

- Cipriano Chemello (1945–2017), Italian cyclist
- Jayme Chemello (1932–2025), Brazilian Roman Catholic prelate
