= Carlos Rômulo Gonçalves e Silva =

The Most Reverend Carlos Rômulo Gonçalves e Silva
- bishop of Montenegro
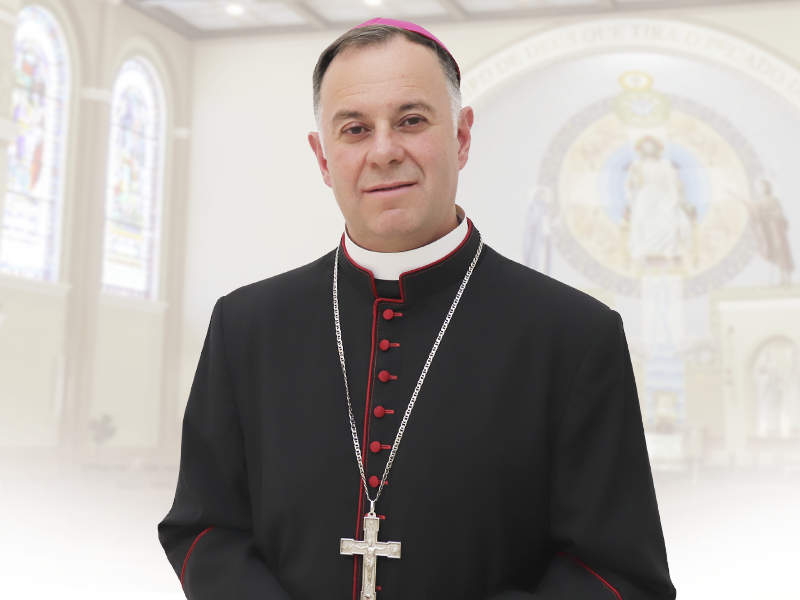
- Gonçalves e Silva in 2017
- Church: Roman Catholic Church
- Province: Roman Catholic Archdiocese of Porto Alegre
- Diocese: Roman Catholic Diocese of Montenegro
- Appointed: 22 March 2017
- Predecessor: Paulo Antônio de Conto
- Successor: Incumbent
- Previous posts: Father Rector of the diocesan seminary (2011–2017); Archdiocesan general vicar (2017)

Orders
- Ordination: 8 December 1994 by Jayme Henrique Chemello
- Consecration: 4 June 2017 by Jacinto Bergmann

Personal details
- Born: Carlos Rômulo Gonçalves e Silva; 24 January 1969 (age 57) Piratini, Rio Grande do Sul, Brazil
- Denomination: Roman Catholic
- Motto: Servite Domino in Laetitia ('Serve ye the Lord with gladness')
- Coat of arms

Styles of Carlos Rômulo Gonçalves e Silva
- Reference style: The Most Reverend
- Spoken style: Your Excellency
- Religious style: bishop
- Posthumous style: not applicable

Carlos Rômulo Gonçalves e Silva (born 24 January 1969) is the bishop of Montenegro, a suffragan Latin diocese in the ecclesiastical province of its mother see, the Metropolitan Archdiocese of Porto Alegre (in the state capital) in Rio Grande do Sul state, southernmost Brazil.

== Biography ==
=== Early life and priesthood ===
Gonçalves e Silva was born in 1969 in Piratini, in the Archdiocese of Pelotas, Brazil. He entered the diocesan seminary of Pelotas, where he did his secondary studies. He studied philosophy in Catholic University of Pelotas, and theology in São Francisco de Paula seminary. He also earned a degree in spirituality in Rome and attended university courses in Brazil.

On 9 December 1994 he was ordained a priest. He was rector of the Diocesan Seminary and then General Vicar em Pelotas.

=== Bishop ===
On 22 March 2017, he was appointed Coadjutor Bishop of Roman Catholic Diocese of Montenegro by Pope Francis, and received episcopal consecration on 9 June by the most reverend Jacinto Bergmann.

Catholic Church titles
Preceded by Paulo Antônio de Conto	Bishop of Montenegro; 2017 –	Succeeded by
