= Diocese of Frederico Westphalen =

Catholic ecclesiastical territory

Diocese of Frederico Westphalen Dioecesis Vestphaleniana

Catholic
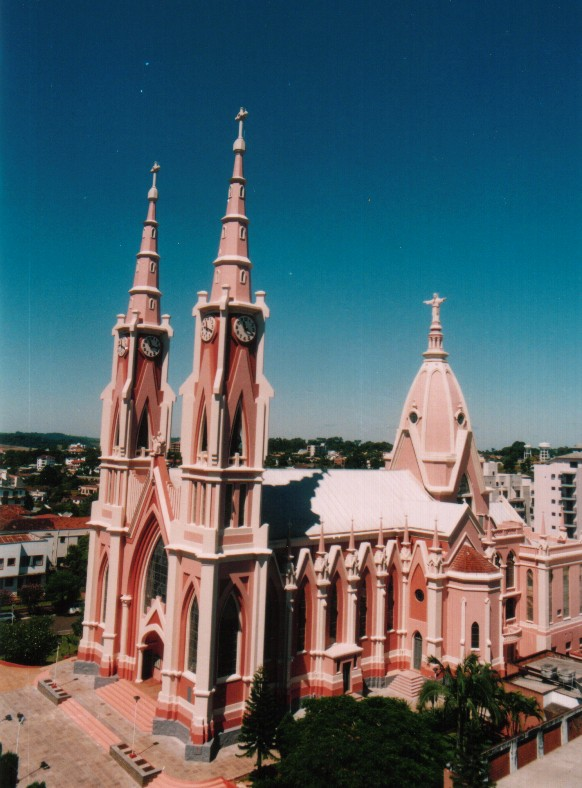
- Cathedral of Saint Anthony, Frederico Westphalen, Brazil

Location
- Country: Brazil
- Ecclesiastical province: Passo Fundo

Statistics
- Area: 11,473 km^{2} (4,430 sq mi)
- Population: Total; Catholics: (as of 2004); 389,749; 286,494 (73.5%)

Information
- Rite: Latin Rite
- Established: 22 May 1961 (65 years ago)
- Cathedral: Cathedral of Saint Anthony

Current leadership
- Pope: Leo XIV
- Bishop: Antônio Carlos Rossi Keller
- Metropolitan Archbishop: Rodolfo Luís Weber

Website
- www.diocesefw.com.br

The Roman Catholic Diocese of Frederico Westphalen (Latin: Dioecesis Vestphaleniana) is a diocese located in the city of Frederico Westphalen in the ecclesiastical province of Passo Fundo in Brazil.

== History ==
- 22 May 1961: Established as Diocese of Frederico Westphalen from the Diocese of Passo Fundo and Diocese of Santa Maria

== Leadership ==
- Bishops of Frederico Westphalen (Roman rite)
  - João Aloysio Hoffmann † (26 March 1962 - 27 May 1971) Appointed, Bishop of Erexim
  - Bruno Maldaner † (27 May 1971 - 12 December 2001) Retired
  - Zeno Hastenteufel (12 December 2001 - 28 March 2007) Appointed, Bishop of Novo Hamburgo
  - Antônio Carlos Rossi Keller (11 June 2008 – present)
