= Zeno Hastenteufel =

Brazilian Catholic bishop (1946–2025)

The Most Reverend Zeno Hastenteufel
- Bishop emeritus of Novo Hamburgo
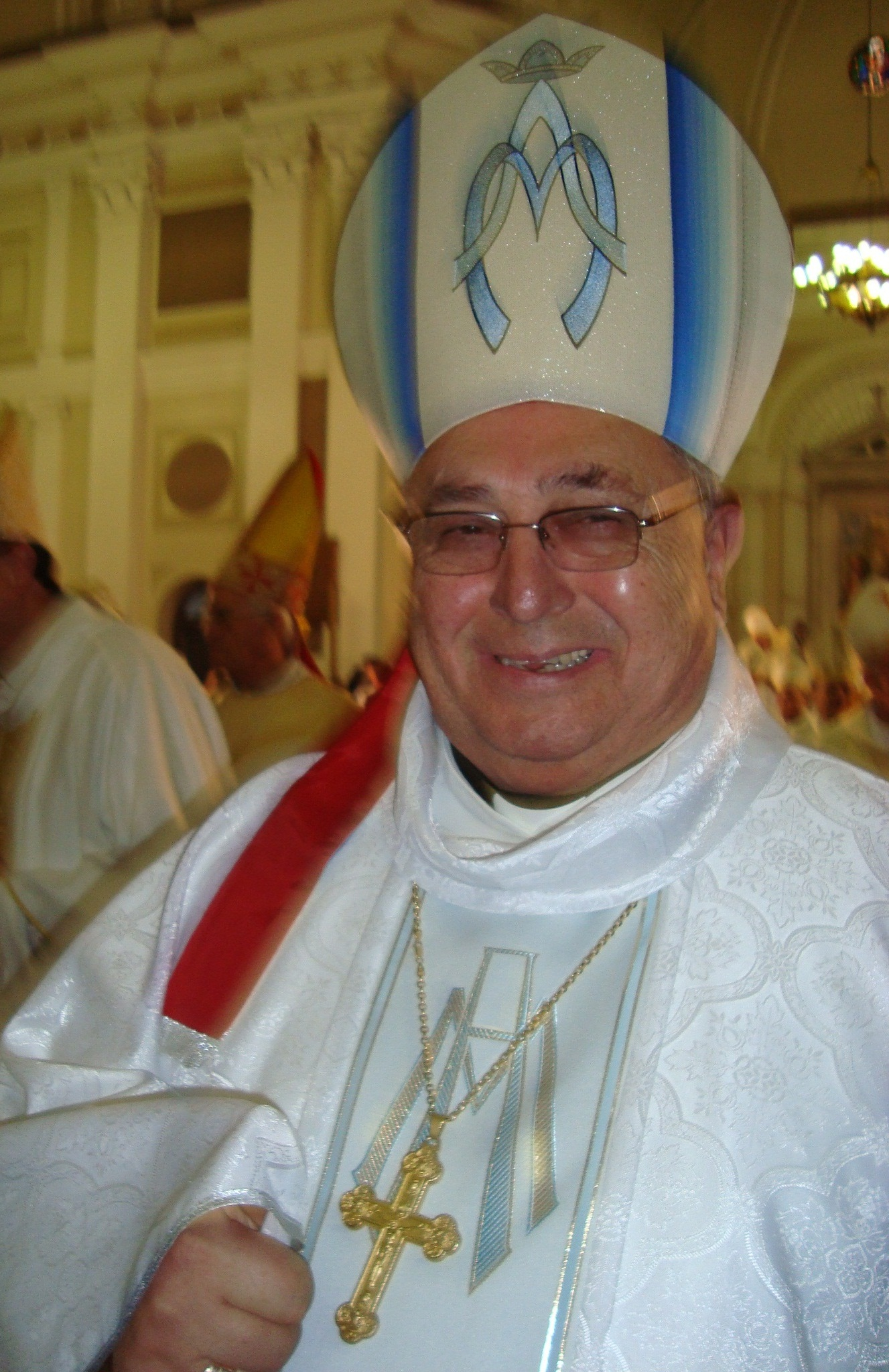
- Church: Roman Catholic Church
- Diocese: Novo Hamburgo
- See: Novo Hamburgo
- In office: 29 April 2007 – 19 January 2022
- Predecessor: Osvino José Both
- Successor: João Francisco Salm
- Other post: Bishop of Frederico Westphalen (2002–2007)

Orders
- Ordination: 8 July 1972
- Consecration: 8 March 2002 by Dadeus Grings

Personal details
- Born: 14 June 1946 Montenegro, Rio Grande do Sul, Brazil
- Died: 30 April 2025 (aged 78) Porto Alegre, Rio Grande do Sul, Brazil
- Education: Pontifical Catholic University of Rio Grande do Sul; Pontifical Gregorian University
- Motto: NUNTIO GAUDIUM VOBIS

Zeno Hastenteufel (14 June 1946 – 30 April 2025) was a Brazilian Roman Catholic bishop who was the bishop of the diocese of Novo Hamburgo. Prior to the post, he was the bishop of the diocese of Frederico Westphalen from 2002 to 2007.

== Biography ==
=== Early life ===
Hastenteufel was born on 14 June 1946. Of German origin, he was born in Linha Rodrigues da Rosa, at that time in the town of Montenegro. He was the son of Olindo and Anna Amélia Hastenteufel. He went to primary school in the rural school of Cônego Alfredo Caspary, in Linha Francesa Alta in the town of Barão. He would go on to attend secondary school at Seminário São José in Gravataí from 1960 to 1966, study philosophy at the Faculdade de Filosofia in Viamão from 1967 to 1968, and again from 1971 to 1972, and theology at the Faculty of Theology at the Pontifical Catholic University of Rio Grande do Sul (PUCRS) from 1969 to 1972. He did his pastoral work as a seminarian at the parish of Santa Ana de Gravataí, being the first seminarian at that parish.

=== Priesthood ===
Hastenteufel was ordained a priest on 8 July 1972, and worked as the vicar treasurer for Paróquia Nossa Senhora da Conceição in Sapucaia do Sul. He was a professor of Religious Culture at PUCRS from 1973 to 1981.

From 1973 to 1975, he worked as a parochial vicar at Paróquia São Pedro in Porto Alegre; he also founded the Curso de Liderança Juvenil (CLJ) in 1973. He became the spiritual director of the project from 1974 until 1981. From 1976 to 1981, he was the parish priest of Paróquia Santo Antônio Pão dos Pobres, in Porto Alegre. During this time, Hastenteufel implemented masses at 20:00 every Wednesday, called the "Missa da Almofada", for young people in Porto Alegre.

Hastenteufel earned his masters and doctorate in Ecclesiastic History from the Pontifical Gregorian University in Rome from 1981 to 1985. From 1984 to 1986, he was the vicar for Paróquia Sagrada Família in Porto Alegre. From 1984 to 2001, he was a professor of church history, and was a professor in the Seminário Maior de Viamão from 1987 to 2000.

Hastenteufel was the director of the Institute of Theology of PUCRS from 1988 to 1995, and was the director of newspapers such as Mundo Jovem, Novo Milênio, and Versão Semanal. He was the president of the Theological Commission of CONIC from 1992 to 1996. He would also become responsible for the Pastoral at PUCRS from 1984 to 1995. He became the parish priest at Paróquia São Vicente Mártir, in Porto Alegre from 1987 to 1995, and at Paróquia São Sebastião, also in Porto Alegre, from 1996 to 2001. He took part in the daily program Um novo dia começa para ti, on Aliança FM from 1995 to 2001.

=== As bishop ===
On 12 December 2001, Hastenteufel was nominated by Pope John Paul II to become the diocesan bishop of the Diocese of Frederico Westphalen, becoming ordained at the Metropolitan Cathedral of Our Lady Mother of God on 8 March 2002 by Dadeus Grings and having with him to co-ordain Bruno Maldaner and Eduardo Benes de Sales Rodrigues. During his time as bishop there, he gave attention to the graduation of the clergy there, to the restoration of the cathedral, and to the beatification of people such as Manuel Gómez González and Adílio Daronch.

On 28 March 2007, he was nominated by Pope Benedict XVI to become the bishop of the Diocese of Novo Hamburgo. He assumed the diocese on 29 April that same year. From 2007 to 2011, he was the referential bishop of Pastoral Familiar no Regional and, afterwards, Secretary of the Sul-3 region of the Episcopal Conference of Brazil (CNBB), a position he held until 2011. During this time as bishop of Novo Hamburgo, he implemented the Santas Missões Populares project.

During the 49th Assembly of Bishops in Brazil in Aparecida, on 10 May 2011, he was elected president of the Sul-3 region of the CNBB. That same year he was chosen as the referential bishop for the Pastoral Familiar of the Sul-3 Region.

On 19 January 2022, due to rules regarding age limits, Pope Francis brought forth the request for Hastenteufel's dismissal.

=== Death ===
Hastenteufel died due to complications from surgery after the removal of a tumor in Porto Alegre, on the morning of 30 April 2025, at the age of 78.

== Bibliography ==
1. Crisma a grande opção (1978)
2. Dom Feliciano na Igreja do Rio Grande do Sul (1987)
3. História da Igreja para debate (1989)
4. O Credo e os Sacramentos (1994)
5. Infância e Adolescência da Igreja (1993)
6. O Catecismo ao alcance de todos (2001)
7. História da Igreja Antiga e Medieval I (2001)
8. História da Igreja Nova II (2001)
9. História da Igreja no Brasil e no Rio grande do Sul (2007)
