= Diocese of Rio Grande =

Diocese of Rio Grande may refer to:

- Episcopal Diocese of the Rio Grande, located in New Mexico and Texas, United States
- Roman Catholic Diocese of Rio Grande, located in Rio Grande, Brazil
