= Archdiocese of Pelotas =

Catholic ecclesiastical territory

Coordinates: 31.7638°S 52.3386°W

Archdiocese of Pelotas Archidioecesis Pelotensis

Catholic
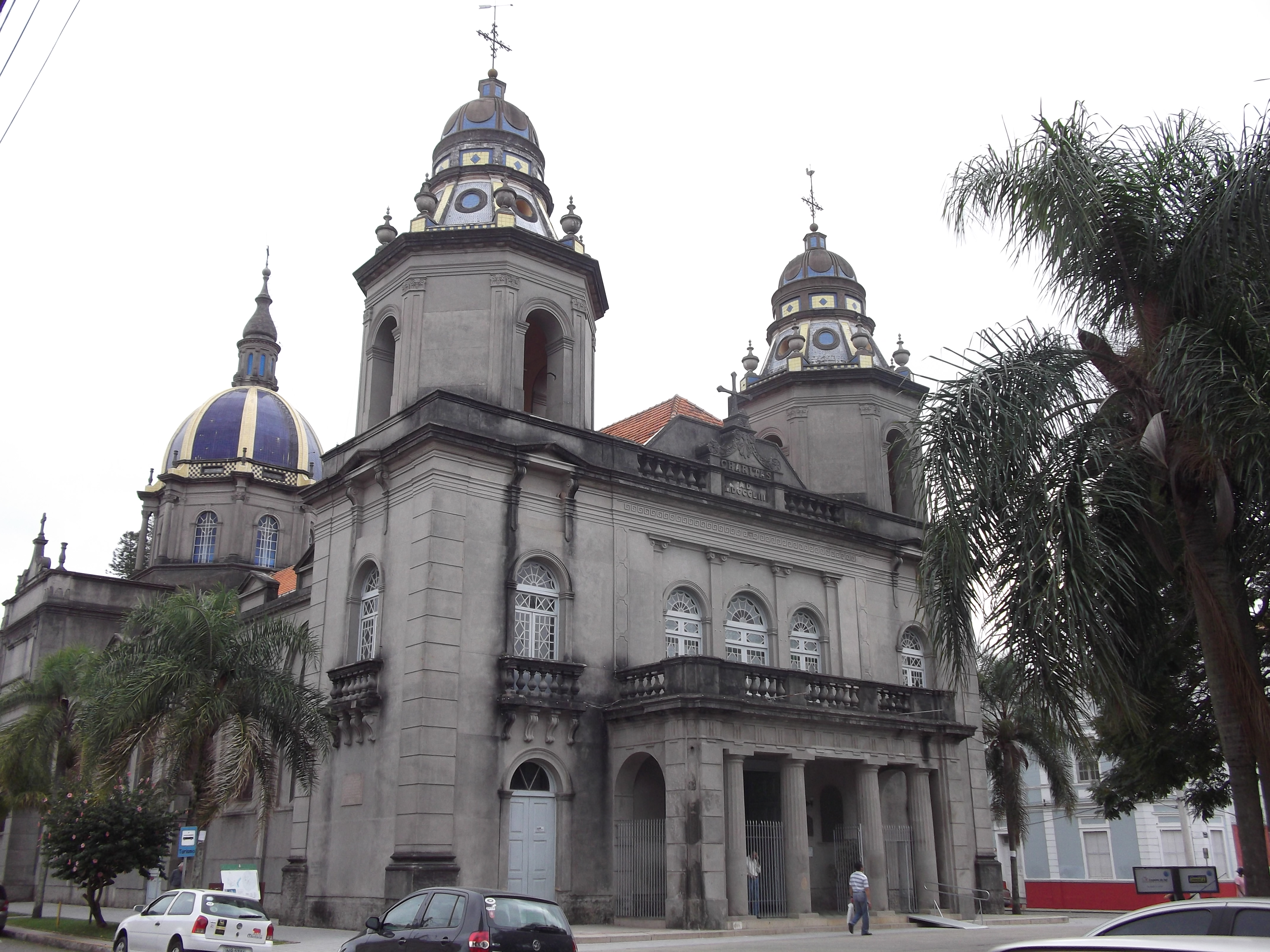
- Cathedral of St. Francis of Paola

Location
- Country: Brazil
- Ecclesiastical province: Pelotas

Statistics
- Area: 20,737 km^{2} (8,007 sq mi)
- Population: Total; Catholics: (as of 2004); 543,732; 315,000 (57.9%)

Information
- Rite: Latin Rite
- Established: 15 August 1910 (116 years ago)
- Cathedral: Cathedral of Saint Francis of Paola

Current leadership
- Pope: Leo XIV
- Archbishop: Jacinto Bergmann

Website
- arquidiocesedepelotas.org

The Archdiocese of Pelotas (Latin: Archidioecesis Pelotensis) is a Roman Catholic archdiocese located in the city of Pelotas, Rio Grande do Sul. Before being elevated to an archdiocese in its own right on April 13, 2011, it was part of the ecclesiastical province of Porto Alegre in Brazil.

== History ==
- 15 August 1910: Established as Diocese of Pelotas from the Diocese of São Pedro do Rio Grande
- 13 April 2011: Elevated to archdiocese

== Bishops ==
- Bishops of Pelotas (Roman rite)
  - Franciscus de Campos Barreto † (12 May 1911 – 30 July 1920) Appointed, Bishop of Campinas
  - Ioachimus Ferreira de Melo † (15 March 1921 – 22 September 1940) Died
  - Antonio Zattera † (31 January 1942 – 1 September 1977) Resigned
  - Jayme Chemello † (1 September 1977 – 1 July 2009) Resigned
  - Jacinto Bergmann (1 July 2009 – 13 April 2011) Appointed archbishop
- Archbishops of Pelotas (Roman rite)
  - Jacinto Bergmann (13 April 2011 – present)

=== Auxiliary bishops ===
- Angelo Félix Mugnol (1966–1969), appointed Bishop of Bagé, Rio Grande do Sul
- Jayme Henrique Chemello (1969–1977), appointed Bishop here
- Jacinto Bergmann (2002–2004), appointed Bishop of Tubarão, Santa Catarina (later returned here as Bishop)

=== Another priest of this diocese who became bishop ===
≠Carlos Rômulo Gonçalves e Silva, appointed Coadjutor Bishop of Montenegro in 2017

== Suffragan Sees ==
- Diocese of Bagé
- Diocese of Rio Grande
