= Carlos Kloppenburg =

German-born Brazilian bishop

Carlos Kloppenburg, O.F.M.
- Bishop of Diocese of Novo Hamburgo (emeritus)
- Church: Roman Catholic Church
- See: Diocese of Novo Hamburgo
- In office: 1986 - 1995
- Predecessor: Aloísio Sinésio Bohn
- Successor: Osvino José Both
- Previous post: Priest

Orders
- Ordination: January 6, 1946

Personal details
- Born: Karl Josef Kloppenburg; November 2, 1919 Molbergen, Germany
- Died: May 8, 2009 (aged 89) Vale do Sinos, Brazil

Carlos José Boaventura Kloppenburg, O.F.M. (November 2, 1919 – May 8, 2009) was a German-born Brazilian bishop of the Roman Catholic Church.

== Biography ==
Carlos Kloppenburg was born in Molbergen, district of Cloppenburg near Oldenburg, Germany, on November 2, 1919. His parents were Bernard and Josephine Kloppenburg who immigrated to Brazil with their family of 9 in 1924.

In 1934, he entered the seminary of São Leopoldo, where he studied for 3 years; in 1941, he moved to Petropólis, Rio de Janeiro, to continue his studies.

Carlos Kloppenburg was ordained a priest of the Roman Catholic Church on January 6, 1946, in the religious order of the Orders of Friars Minor under the name Boaventura (in English and German, Bonaventure). He was ordained a bishop on August 1, 1982, and appointed auxiliary bishop of the Archdiocese of São Salvador da Bahia and Titular Bishop of Vulturaria on May 22, 1982. On August 8, 1986, Pope John Paul II appointed him to the Diocese of Novo Hamburgo. He retired as Bishop emeritus of the diocese on November 22, 1995.

His principal life work was that of a professor of Theology. He studied at the Antonianum University, Rome (D.Th., 1950). During the decade of the 1950s he made a study of Spiritism in Brazil. For that purpose he also studied parapsychology at Duke University, U.S.A., under Dr. Charles S Rhyne.

Bishop Kloppenburg was a prolific writer. He wrote and published extensively on the theology of the Roman Catholic Church. In the 1950s and into the 1960s, he wrote on Spiritism in Brazil.

Bishop Kloppenburg was a Peritus of the Brazilian Bishops at Vatican II. He wrote the leading analytical work on Vatican II, The Ecclesiology of Vatican II. On August 12, 1980, Bishop Kloppenburg was appointed a member of the International Theological Commission (Acta Apostolicae Sedis)

While at Vatican II and before, he was closely associated with then Bishop Joseph Ratzinger, now Pope Benedict XVI. They had known each other from the time Bishop Kloppenburg was the doctoral thesis, supervisor of Dom Leonardo Boff, a Brazilian Liberation Theologian, also of the Franciscan order (Leonardo Boff left the Catholic priesthood after criticism from then Father Kloppenburg directed at Boff's liberation theology). The relationship of Bishop Kloppenburg to Bishop, and then Cardinal Ratzinger is described in Pope Benedict XVI, a biography of Pope Benedict XVI by John L. Allen (Continuum, 2000).

Bishop Kloppenburg in the 1970s and 1980s was engaged in doctrinal battles with the proponents of liberation theology.

== Works ==
Bishop Kloppenburg wrote and spoke extensively on the subject of spiritism during the decades of the 1950s and the 1960s including:

- Nossas Superstiçoes (Our Superstitions; 1959);
- O Espiritismo no Brasil (Spiritism in Brazil; 1960);
- O Reencarnacionismo no Brasil (Reincarnationism in Brazil; 1961);
- A Maçonaria no Brasil (Masonry in Brazil; 4th ed., 1961)

Pamphlets, including:

- As Sociedades Teosoficas (The Theosophical Societies; 1959);
- O Rusacrucianismo no Brasil (The Rosicrucian Society in Brazil; 1959);
- Astrologia, Quiromancia e Quejandos (Astrology, Chiromancy and the Like; 1960)

Source: Helene Pleasants (1964) Biographical Dictionary of Parapsychology with Directory and Glossary 1946-1996 NY: Garrett Publications

Bishop Kloppenburg's theological works include:

- De Relatione inter Peccatum et Mortem (The Relationship Between Sin and Death; 1951);
- The People's Church translated from the Spanish, Iglesia Popular 1977, on the subject of liberation theology, and the Catholic Church and socialism;
- Christian Salvation and Human Temporal Progress translated from the Spanish work, Salvacion Cristiana y Progresso Human Temporal 1978 on the subject of Christian salvation, progress, and liberation theology;
- Pastoral Practice and the Paranormal Translated by Paul Burns. Chicago: Franciscan Herald Press, 1979;
- The Ecclesiology of Vatican II is the leading analytical work on Vatican II.

== See also ==
- Archdiocese of São Salvador da Bahia
- Diocese of Novo Hamburgo
