= Dadeus Grings =

Brazilian Roman Catholic bishop (1936–2026)

The Most Reverend Dadeus Grings
- Archbishop of Porto Alegre
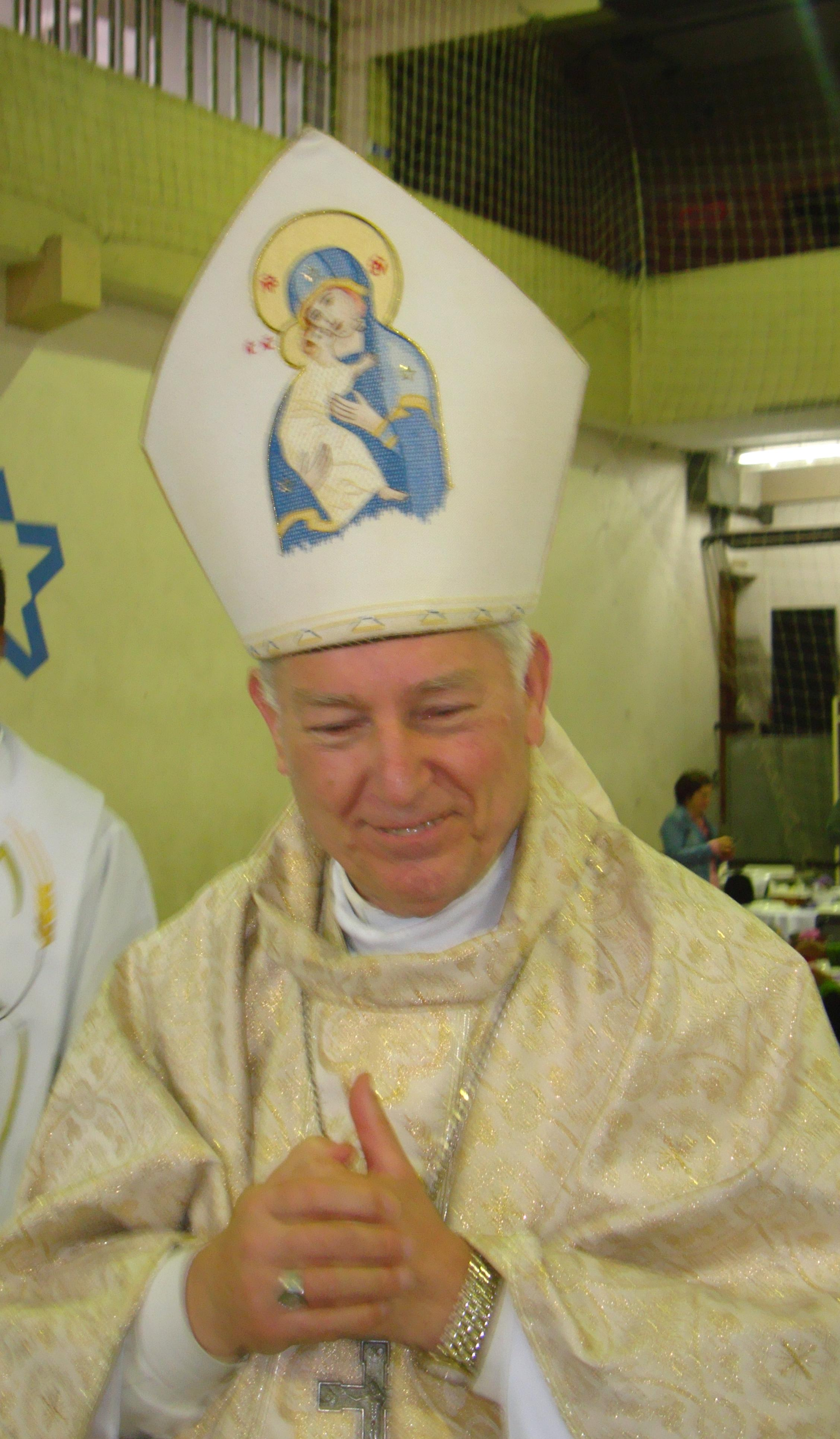
- See: Porto Alegre
- Installed: 12 April 2000
- Term ended: 18 September 2013
- Predecessor: Altamiro Rossato
- Successor: Jaime Spengler
- Other post: Bishop of São João da Boa Vista (1991–2000)

Orders
- Ordination: 23 December 1961 by Antonio Samorè
- Consecration: 15 March 1991 by Tomás Vaquero, Alfredo Vicente Scherer and Aloísio Sinésio Bohn

Personal details
- Born: 7 September 1936 Nova Petrópolis, Rio Grande do Sul, Brazil
- Died: 21 September 2026 (aged 90) Gravataí, Rio Grande do Sul, Brazil
- Denomination: Roman Catholic
- Education: Pontifical Gregorian University

Dadeus Grings (7 September 1936 – 21 September 2026) was a Brazilian Roman Catholic prelate who served as Archbishop of Porto Alegre. He also served as the chancellor of the Catholic University of Rio Grande do Sul.

== Life and career ==
Grings was born on 7 September 1936 in Nova Petrópolis, Rio Grande do Sul.

He was ordained as a priest on 23 December 1961. He was appointed Bishop of São João da Boa Vista on 23 January 1991. He was appointed coadjutor archbishop of Porto Alegre on 12 April 2000, and succeeded to the position of archbishop on acceptance of the resignation of his predecessor, Archbishop Altamiro Rossato C.Ss.R. on 7 February 2001. He was succeeded on 18 September 2013 by Archbishop Jaime Spengler.

He was the author of 27 books.

Grings died in Gravatal, Rio Grande do Sul, on 21 September 2026 at the age of 90.

== Controversial comments on paedophilia ==
International controversy occurred in response to comments about paedophilia made by Grings on 4 May 2010. Speaking about accusations of paedophilia against priests, he said that society as a whole is paedophilic and that the sexual abuse of children and adolescents is more common among doctors, teachers and businessmen than among priests. The problem, he said, is that today's society is paedophilic, with the result that people easily fall into it. He said that its being denounced is a good sign and that all forms of sexuality were being banalized and that the acquisition of legal rights by homosexuals was likely to lead to recognition of the rights of paedophiles. Grings stated clearly that the sexual abuse of children and adolescents is a crime and should be punished but, he admitted, that while the church does adopt internal measures against the guilty, it finds it difficult to denounce its own members to the police. It is unjust, he said, to present paedophilia as a matter that concerns only the church when in Germany it had been found that only 0.2% of child abuse was committed by priests. He also said that homosexuality is innate in few cases and generally results from failure to overcome an adolescent experimental stage. A spokesman for the bishops conference distanced himself from Grings' remark that society as a whole is paedophile, while English-language reports misinterpreted his admission that the church finds it difficult to denounce priests to the police as if he had said that "internal punishment of priests guilty of abuse was sufficient and that police should not be involved".

Catholic Church titles
Preceded by Tomás Vaquero	Bishop of São João da Boa Vista; 23 January 1991 – 12 April 2000	Succeeded by David Dias Pimentel
Preceded by Altamiro Rossato CSSR	Archbishop of Porto Alegre; 7 February 2001 – 18 September 2013	Succeeded by Jaime Spengler
