= Molbergen =

- Municipality
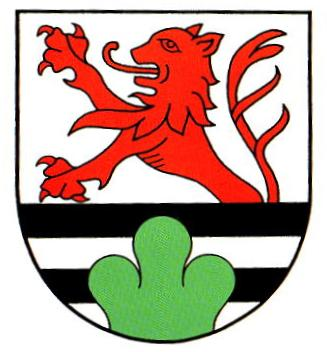
- Flag Coat of arms

- Location of Molbergen within Cloppenburg district
- Interactive map of Molbergen
- Location within Germany Location within Lower Saxony
- Coordinates: 52°52′N 7°56′E
- Country: Germany
- State: Lower Saxony
- District: Cloppenburg
- Subdivisions: 6 districts

Government
  - Mayor (2019–24): Witali Bastian (Ind.)

Area
  - Total: 102.56 km^{2} (39.60 sq mi)
- Elevation: 35 m (115 ft)

Population (2025-12-31)
  - Total: 9,363
  - Density: 91.29/km^{2} (236.4/sq mi)
- Time zone: UTC+01:00 (CET)
  - Summer (DST): UTC+02:00 (CEST)
- Postal codes: 49696
- Dialling codes: 0 44 75, 0 44 79
- Vehicle registration: CLP
- Website: www.molbergen.de

Molbergen (German pronunciation: [ˈmɔlbɛʁɡn̩]; Low German: Molbern) is a municipality in the district of Cloppenburg, in Lower Saxony, Germany, approximately 8 km (5 mi) west of Cloppenburg.

== Notable people ==
- 1919-2009: Carlos Kloppenburg, German bishop in Brazil
- (born 1943), Manfred Carstens, German politician (CDU)
