= Diocese of Novo Hamburgo =

Catholic ecclesiastical territory

Coordinates: 29°40′30″S 51°07′50″W

Diocese of Novo Hamburgo Dioecesis Novohamburgensis

Catholic
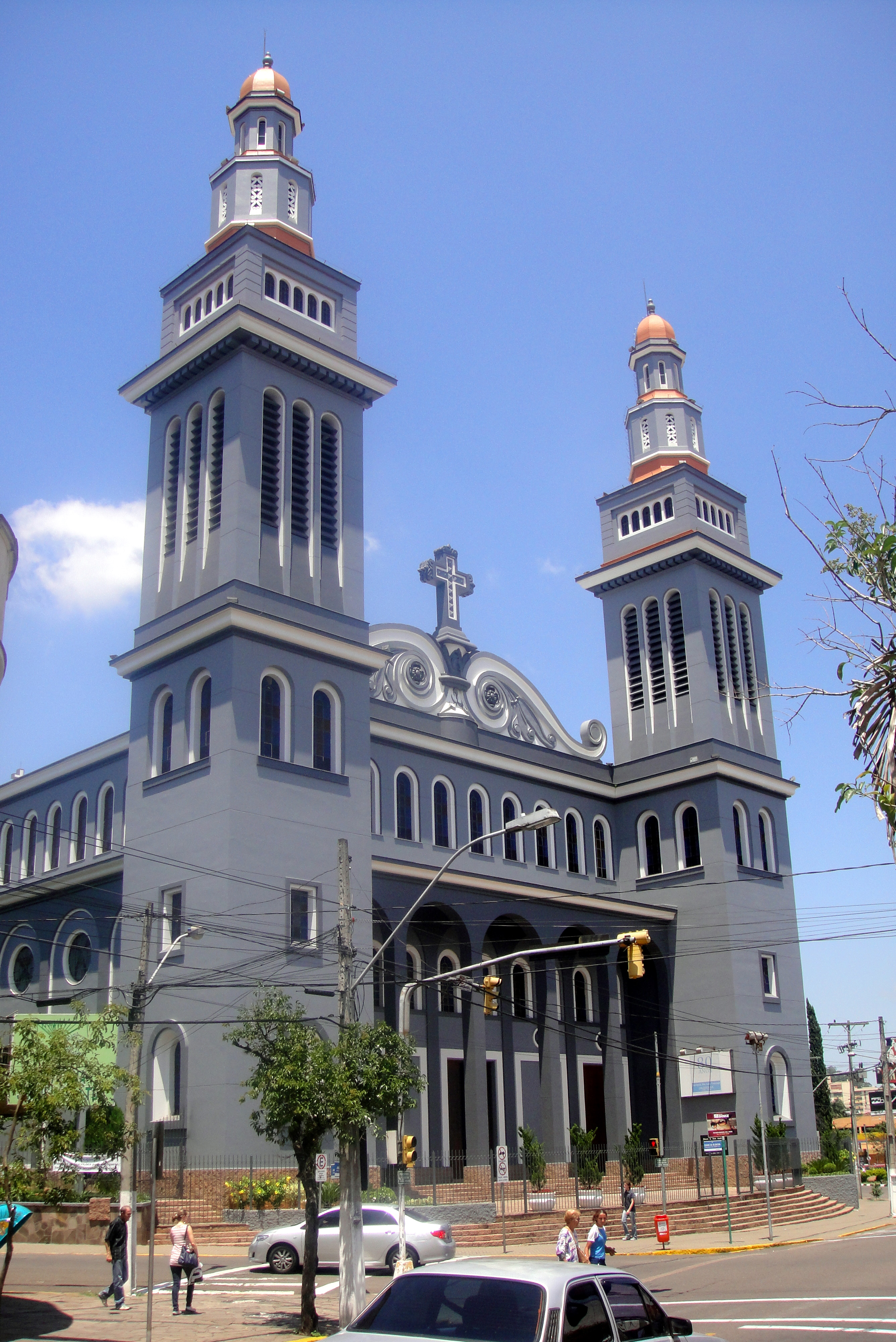
- Cathedral-Basilica of St. Louis Gonzaga

Location
- Country: Brazil
- Ecclesiastical province: Porto Alegre

Statistics
- Area: 3,691 km^{2} (1,425 sq mi)
- Population: Total; Catholics: (as of 2004); 961,783; 721,338 (75.0%)

Information
- Rite: Latin Rite
- Established: 2 February 1980 (46 years ago)
- Cathedral: Catedral Basílica São Luís Gonzaga

Current leadership
- Pope: Leo XIV
- Bishop: João Francisco Salm
- Metropolitan Archbishop: Jaime Spengler

Website
- www.mitranh.org.br

The Roman Catholic Diocese of Novo Hamburgo (Latin: Dioecesis Novohamburgensis) is a diocese located in the city of Novo Hamburgo in the ecclesiastical province of Porto Alegre in Brazil.

== History ==
- 2 February 1980: Established as Diocese of Novo Hamburgo from the Metropolitan Archdiocese of Porto Alegre

== Bishops ==
- Bishops of Novo Hamburgo (Roman rite), in reverse chronological order
  - Bishop João Francisco Salm (2022.01.19 – ...)
  - Bishop Zeno Hastenteufel (2007.03.28 – 2022.01.19)
  - Bishop Osvino José Both (1995.11.22 – 2006.06.07), appointed Archbishop of Brazil, Military
  - Bishop Carlos José Boaventura Kloppenburg, O.F.M. (1986.08.08 – 1995.11.22)
  - Bishop Aloísio Sinésio Bohn (1980.02.13 – 1986.06.27), appointed Bishop of Santa Cruz do Sul, Rio Grande do Sul

=== Another priest of this diocese who became bishop ===
- Edson Batista de Mello, appointed Bishop of Cachoeira do Sul, Rio Grande do Sul
