= Osório wind farm =

Wind farm in Brazil

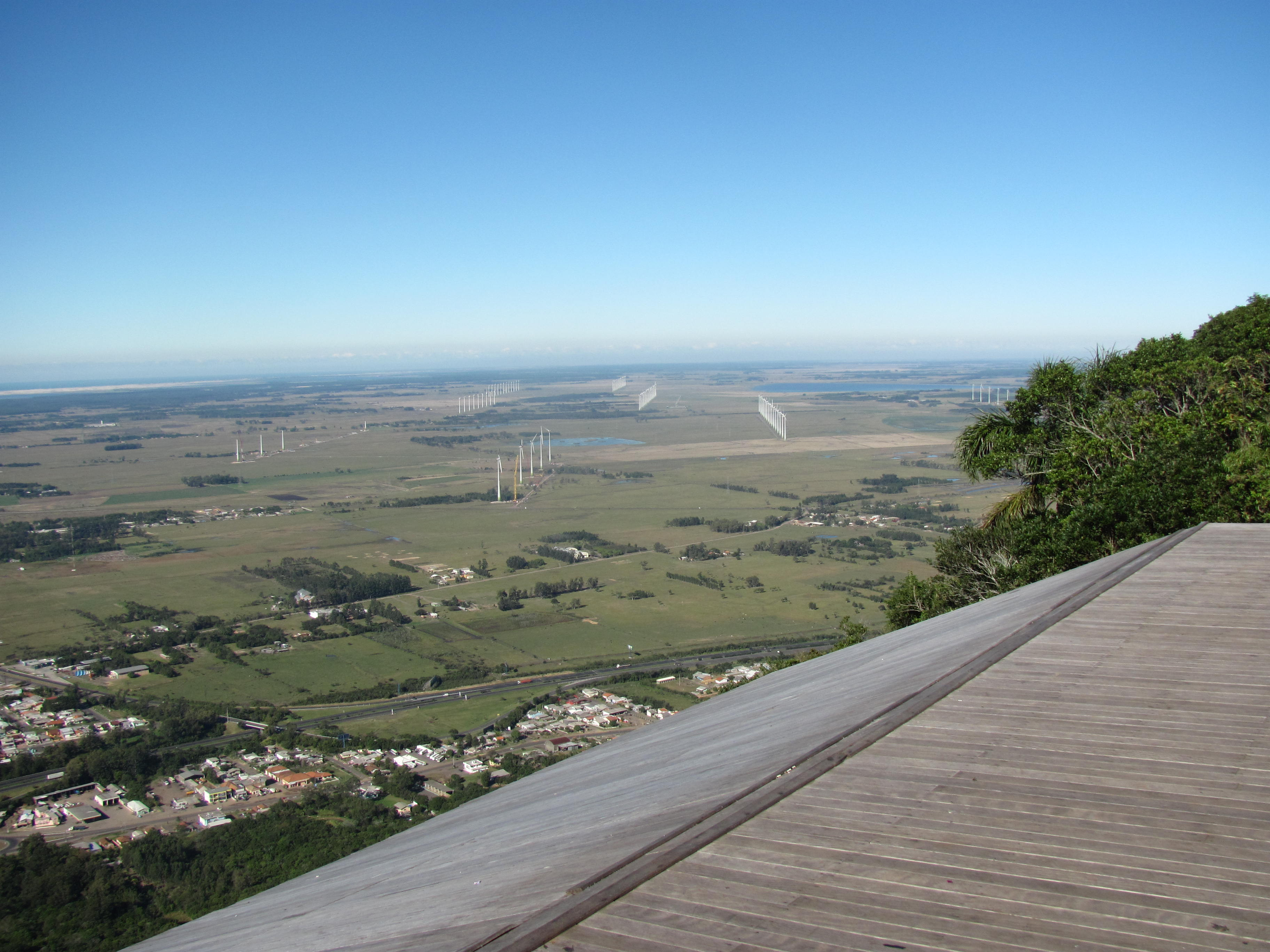
- The Osório wind farm.
- Official name: Parque Eólico de Osório
- Country: Brazil
- Location: Osório, Rio Grande do Sul
- Coordinates: 29°55′05″S 50°18′44″W
- Status: Operational
- Commission date: 2006
- Operator: Enerfin do Brasil

Wind farm
- Type: Onshore
- Hub height: 98 m (322 ft)
- Rotor diameter: 70 m (230 ft)
- Site area: 13,000 ha (130 km^{2})

Power generation
- Units operational: 75 x 2 MW;73 x 2,3 MW
- Make and model: Wobben Windpower: E-70/2000 kW;E-82/2300 kW;E-92/2300 kW
- Nameplate capacity: 317,9 MW

External links
- Website: complexoeolicodeosorio.com.br/br/
- Commons: Related media on Commons

The Osório wind farm (Parque Eólico de Osório in Portuguese) is a wind farm in Southern Brazil, on land near the coast, located near the coastal city of Osório, Rio Grande do Sul. It has maximum power generation capacity of 318 megawatts, a large capacity which ranks among the largest in the southern hemisphere.

Osório Wind Farm, situated in Osório, is formed by nine wind plants. The main entrance is by the RST-101, km 1,5, where the Visitor Center is. The public attendance starts from 09:40 am until 6:00 pm, including the weekends. Osorio Wind Farm is 90 kilometers away from the capital Porto Alegre and it is on a flat area near Barros Lake on a 10 to 18 meters medium altitude above the sea level. The wind farm is situated on leased lands of Osório, covering approximately 10.400 hectares which only 320 hectares are straightly occupied by the wind farms infrastructures. The project has 148 turbines with a 317,9 MW installed capacity.

== Wind Energy Origin in RS ==
Since the end of the 20th century, the energy resources depletion, the vulnerability of large-scale power outages as well as the environmental concern, led many countries looking for a diversified energy matrix, directing research and investments to a less polluting source of energy.

The wind energy is obtained from the air movement (wind) and it is an inexhaustible, renewable and clean energy source. Its production does not contribute to greenhouse emission gases neither to global warming. Representing a favorable energetic scene, the wind generation helps to minimize the impact caused by the traditional power generation besides not interfering on the usual activities already explored on the area. Considering a favorable wind potential associated with good infrastructure conditions and electrical grid connection, Osório was chosen for this project settlement which became known as Osório Wind Farms (Parques Eólicos de Osório). Ever since, was noticed the community identification with the wind theme represented by the adopted slogan: “Osório, the land of good winds”.

With the contractual commitments signed with Eletrobrás to the Alternative Sources Incentive Program (Programa de Incentivo às Fontes Alternativas - PROINFA), in January 2007, Ventos do Sul Energia started the commercial operation of the first wind project, being recognized, due to its 150 MW of installed capacity, as the biggest wind farm from south hemisphere. In addition, the 2 MW turbines unit power and their advanced technology made this wind farm the first kind in Latin America.

In 2009, 2010 and 2011, the company executed the Osório Wind Farm enlargement through the energy auctions promoted by Federal Government. Currently, the installed capacity reaches 375 MW in operation which understands the Osório and Palmares Wind Farms, both controlled by the Control and Operation Integrated Center in Osório.
