= Altamiro Rossato =

Brazilian Roman Catholic archbishop (1925–2014)

Altamiro Rossato C.Ss.R.
- Archbishop of Porto Alegre
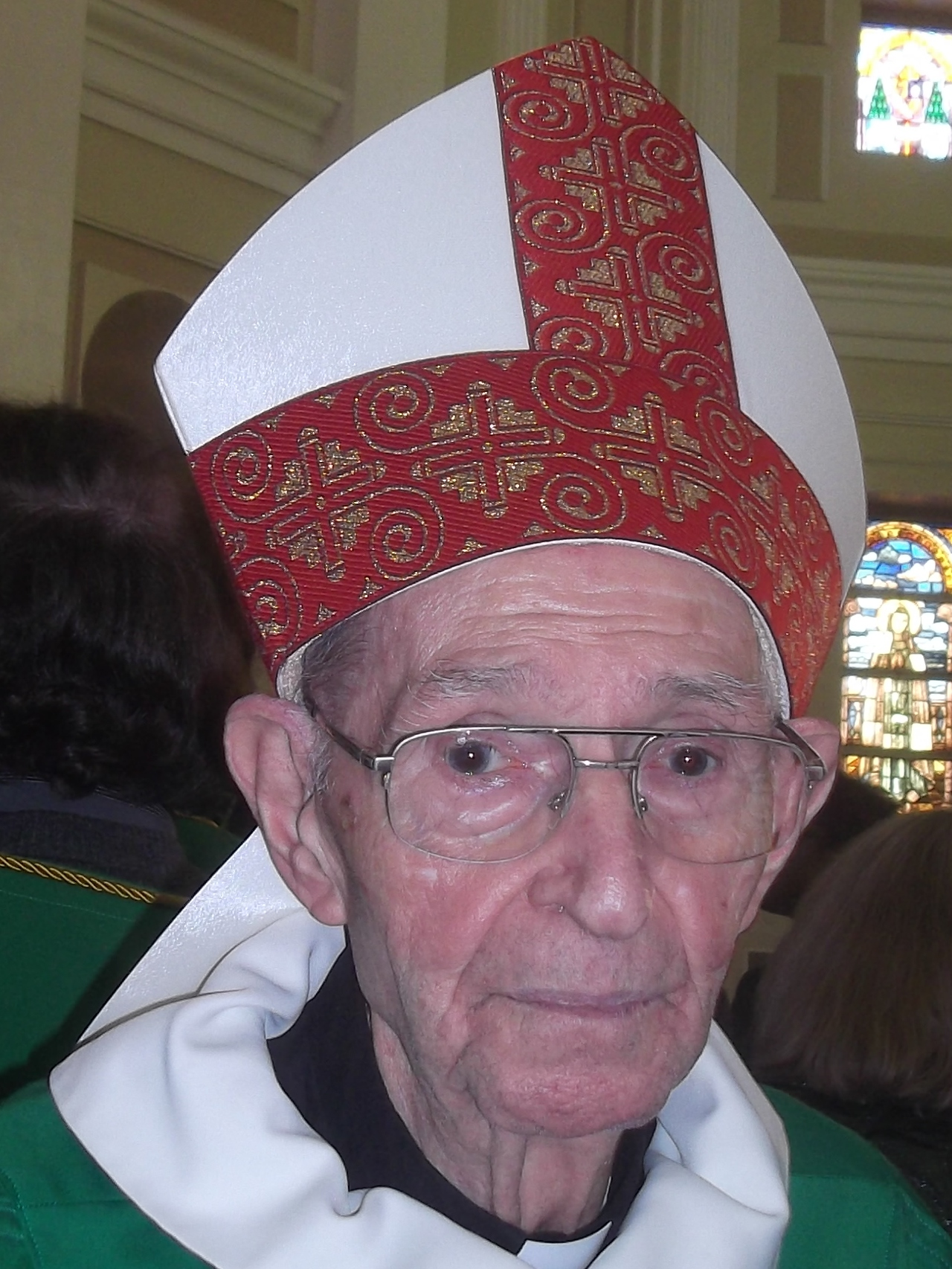
- Rossato in 2013
- Church: Catholic Church
- Archdiocese: Archdiocese of Porto Alegre
- In office: 17 July 1991 – 7 February 2001
- Predecessor: João Cláudio Colling
- Successor: Dadeus Grings
- Previous posts: Coadjutor Archbishop of Porto Alegre (1989-1991); Bishop of Marabá (1985-1989)

Orders
- Ordination: 27 December 1951
- Consecration: 2 March 1986 by Estanislau Amadeu Kreutz

Personal details
- Born: 23 June 1925 Tuparendi, São Pedro do Rio Grande do Sul, Republic of the United States of Brazil
- Died: 13 May 2014 (aged 88) Porto Alegre, Rio Grande do Sul, Brazil

Altamiro Rossato (23 June 1925 – 13 May 2014) was a Brazilian Catholic prelate and Archbishop Emeritus of the Roman Catholic Archdiocese of Porto Alegre. He was Archbishop of Porto Alegre from 1991 till 2001.

== Biography ==
Rossato was born in Campininha in the municipality of Tuparendi in Rio Grande do Sul. and ordained a priest in 1951 in São Paulo.

Rossato continued his studies in Rome, Italy at the Pontifical University of St. Thomas Aquinas, Angelicum completing a Doctorate in Philosophy in 1953 and Doctorate in Theology in 1955.

He was ordained bishop in the city of Marabá, Para in 1985. He became archbishop of Porto Alegre in 1989 and served in this role till 2001.

== Death ==
He died in hospital in St. Francis hospital in Porto Alegre at the age of 88 from multiple organ failure.
