= Jaime Pedro Kohl =

Brazilian Roman Catholic bishop (born 1954)

Jaime Pedro Kohl P.S.D.P.
- Bishop of Osório
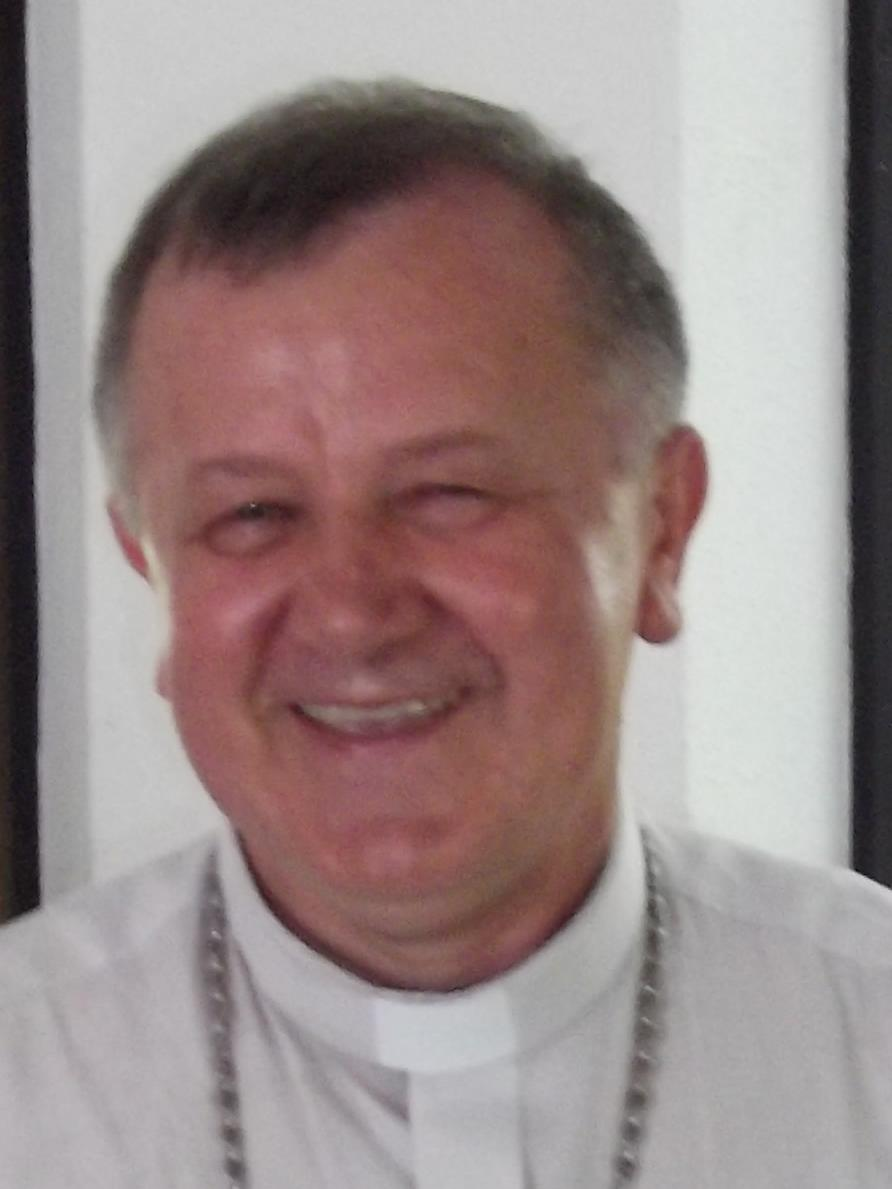
- Jaime Pedro Kohl in 2011
- Church: Catholic Church
- Diocese: Diocese of Osório
- Appointed: 15 November 2006
- Predecessor: Thadeu Gomes Canellas

Orders
- Ordination: 2 September 1984
- Consecration: 4 February 2007 by Thadeu Gomes Canellas

Personal details
- Born: 12 December 1954 (age 71) Rio Grande do Sul, United States of Brazil
- Coat of arms

Jaime Pedro Kohl (born 12 December 1954) is a Brazilian Roman Catholic bishop.

Ordained to the priesthood on 2 September 1984, Kohl was named bishop of the Roman Catholic Diocese of Osório, Brazil on 15 November 2006.
