= Jayme Chemello =

Brazilian Roman Catholic prelate (1932–2025)

His Excellency Jayme Henrique Chemello
- Bishop Emeritus of Pelotas
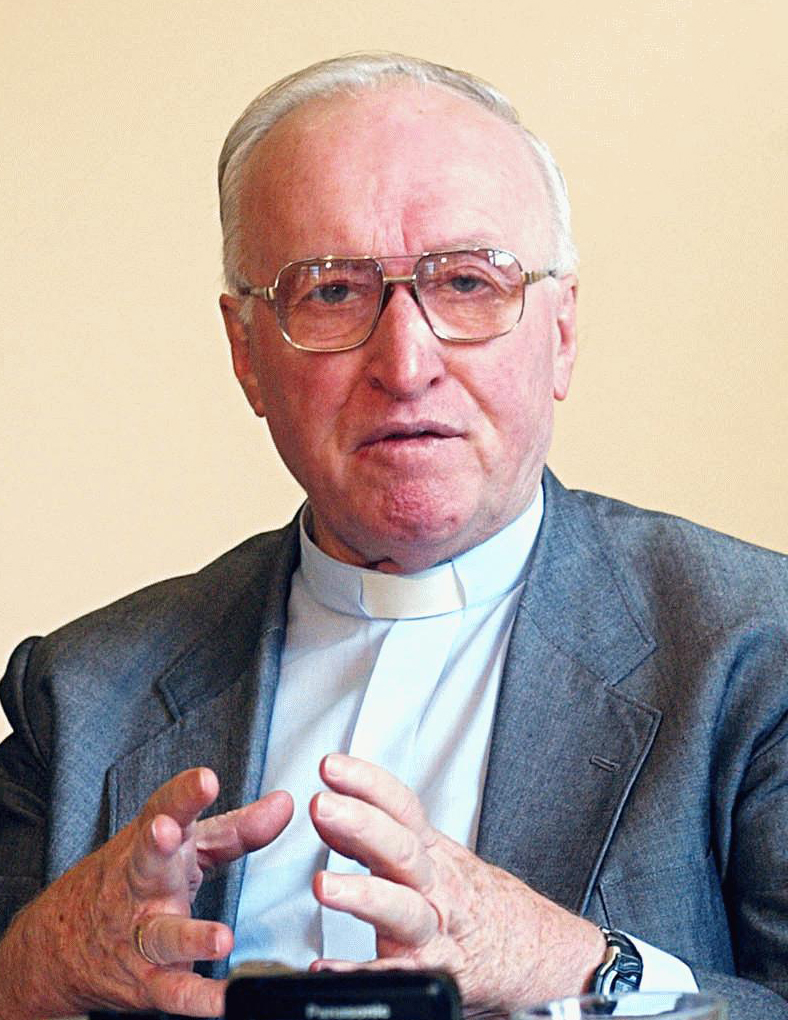
- Chemelo in 2003
- Archdiocese: Porto Alegre
- Diocese: Pelotas
- Installed: 1 September 1977
- Term ended: 1 July 2009
- Predecessor: Antonio Zattera
- Successor: Jacinto Bergmann
- Previous posts: Auxiliary Bishop of Pelotas and Titular Bishop of Bisica (1969–1977)

Orders
- Ordination: 6 December 1958 by Antonio Zattera
- Consecration: 20 April 1969 by Antonio Zattera

Personal details
- Born: 28 July 1932 São Marcos, Rio Grande do Sul, Brazil
- Died: 29 August 2025 (aged 93) Pelotas, Rio Grande do Sul, Brazil
- Motto: Ego veni, ut vitam habeant et abundantius habeant

Jayme Henrique Chemello (28 July 1932 – 29 August 2025) was a Brazilian Roman Catholic prelate. He was appointed auxiliary bishop of Pelotas and titular bishop of Bisica in 1969 and then bishop of Pelotas in 1977. He died in Pelotas on 29 August 2025, at the age of 93.

Catholic Church titles
| Preceded by Antonio Zattera | Bishop of Pelotas; 1977–2009 | Succeeded by Jacinto Bergmann |
| Preceded by Francis Edward Hyland | Titular Bishop of Bisica; 1969–1977 | Succeeded by Gustavo Girón Higuita |
