= Ioachimus Ferreira de Melo =

Brazilian Roman Catholic prelate (1873–1940)

His Excellency Ioachimus Ferreira de Melo
- Pelotas
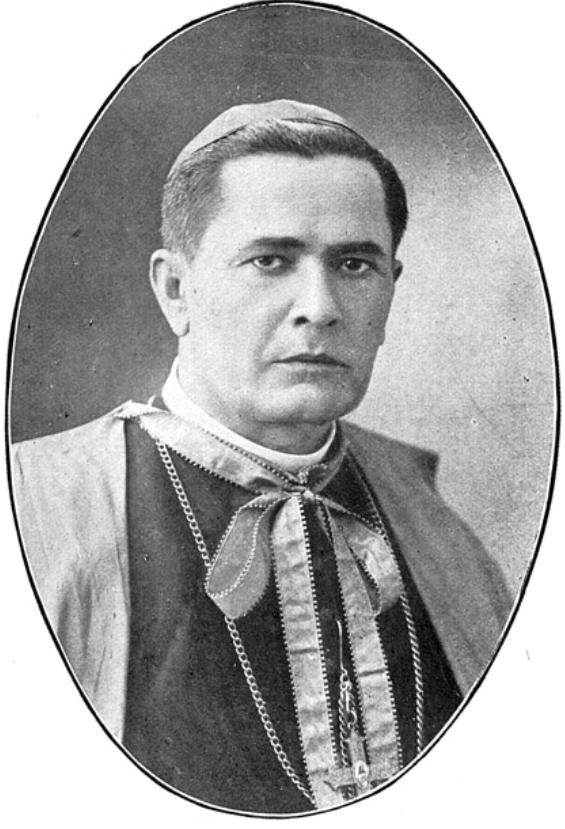
- Native name: Joaquim Ferreira de Melo
- Metropolis: Pelotas
- Installed: 15 March 1921
- Term ended: 22 September 1940
- Predecessor: Franciscus de Campos Barreto
- Successor: Antonio Zattera

Orders
- Ordination: 26 February 1898 by Manuel dos Santos Pereira
- Consecration: 18 September 1921 by Manuel da Silva Gomes

Personal details
- Born: 31 August 1873 Crato, Ceará
- Died: 22 September 1940 (aged 67) Pelotas
- Motto: Ut Christum lucrifaciam

Ioachimus Ferreira de Melo (31 August 1873 – 22 September 1940) was a Brazilian Roman Catholic prelate. He was appointed bishop of Pelotas in 1921. He died still in office in Pelotas on 22 September 1940 at the age of 67.

Catholic Church titles
Preceded by Franciscus de Campos Barreto	Bishop of Pelotas; 1921–1940	Succeeded by Antonio Zattera
