= San Gregorio Magno alla Magliana Nuova =

San Gregorio Magno al Magliana Nouva
- Church of St. Gregory the Great at New Magliana (in English); S. Gregorii Magni in Magliana Nova (in Latin)
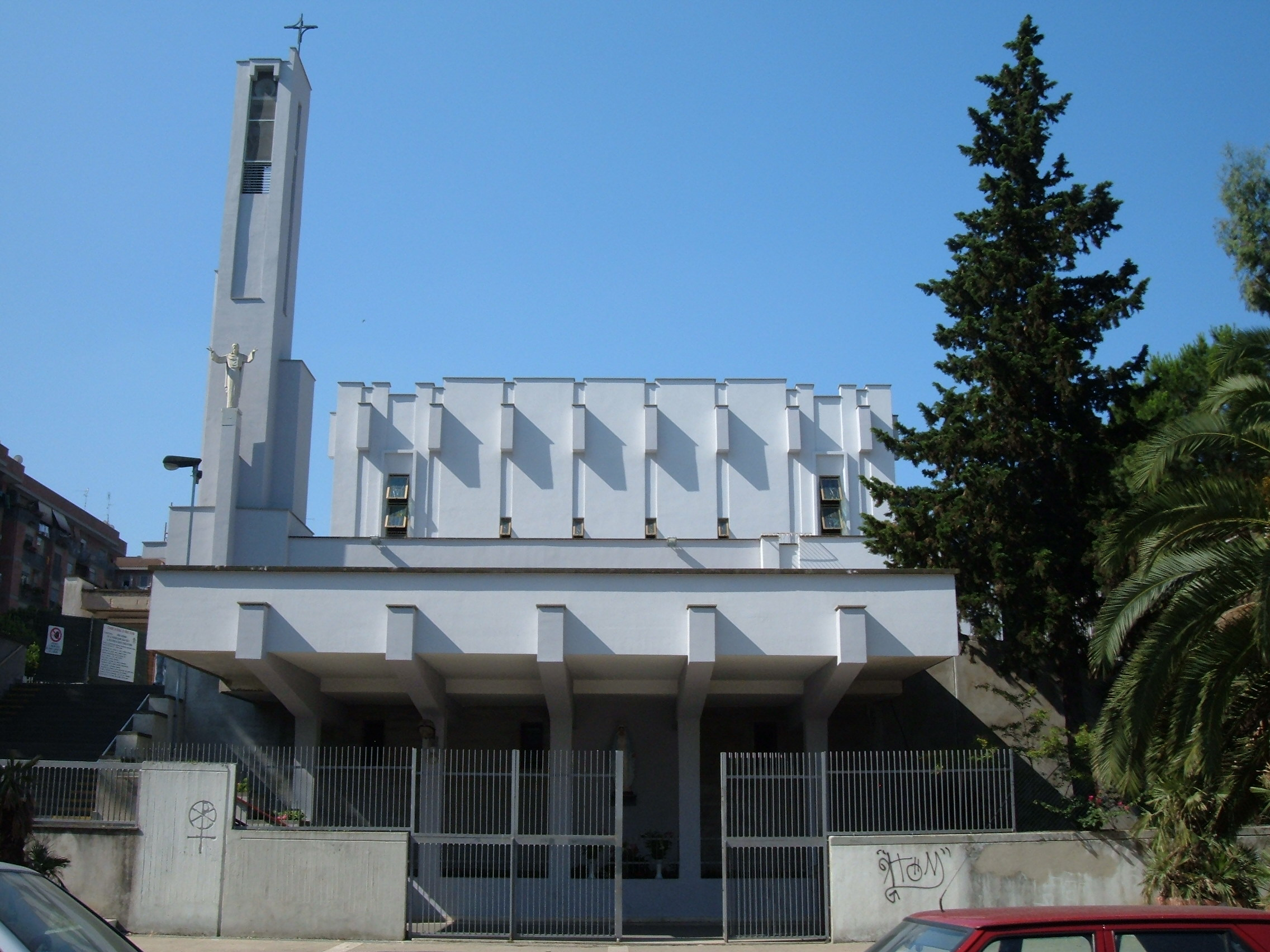
- Facade
- Click on the map for a fullscreen view
- 41°50′42″N 12°27′32″E
- Location: Piazza Certaldo, Rome
- Country: Italy
- Denomination: Roman Catholic
- Tradition: Roman Rite

History
- Status: Titular church
- Dedication: Gregory the Great
- Consecrated: 1963

Architecture
- Architect: Aldo Aloysi
- Architectural type: Church
- Style: Modern
- Groundbreaking: 20th Century

Administration
- District: Lazio
- Province: Rome

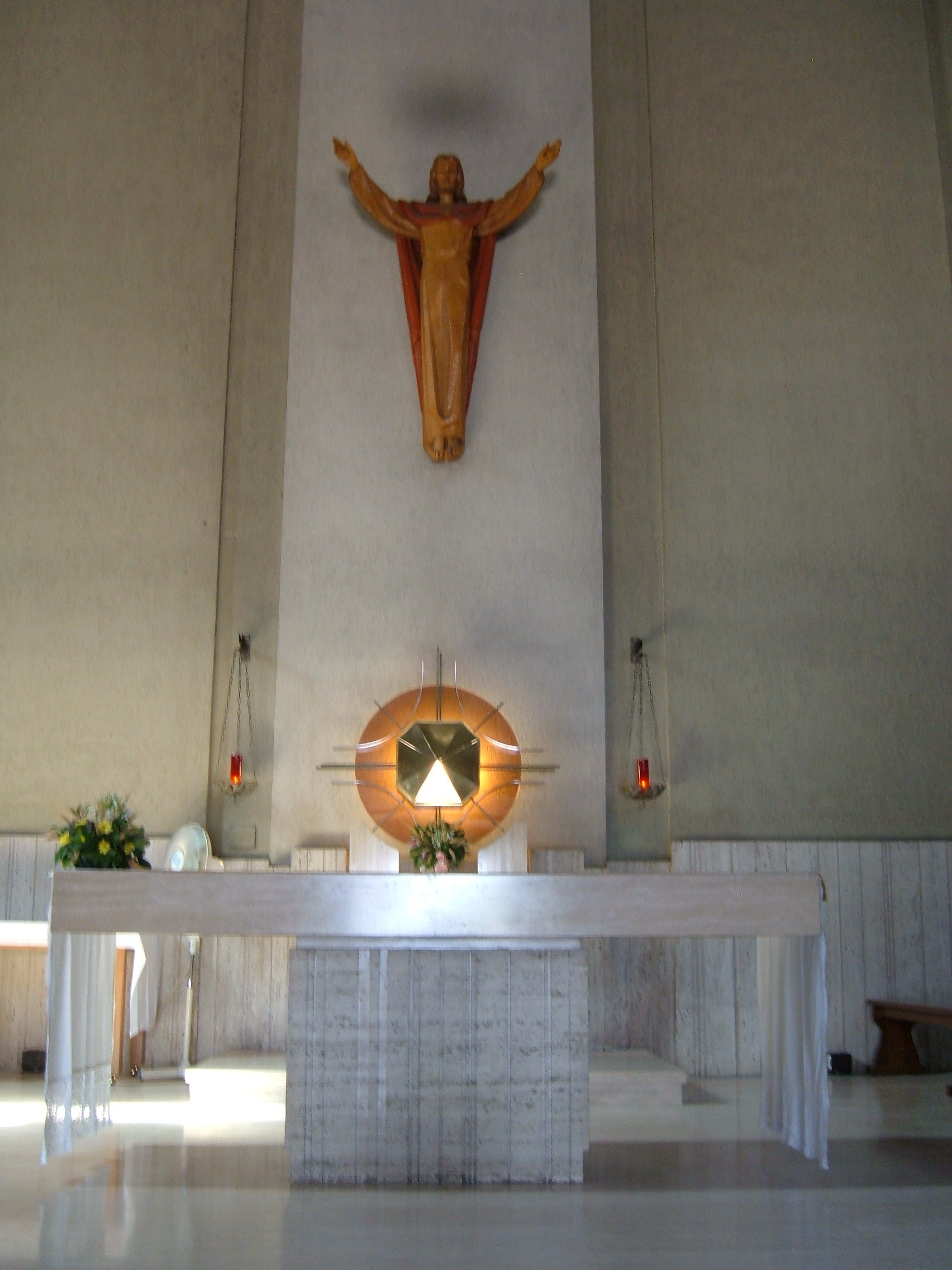
Altar

San Gregorio Magno alla Magliana Nuova is a church in Rome, in the Magliana district, in Piazza Certaldo.

== Description ==
It was built in the twentieth century by the architect Aldo Aloysi. The church is located in an elevated position with respect to the square outside and is accessed by a ladder on the left side. Totally built of reinforced concrete, the church is flanked by a high bell tower, which features a statue of Christ with outstretched arms.

The church is the home of the parish, established on 14 December 1963 by decree of the Cardinal Vicar Clemente Micara Neminem sane latet. The church is linked to the titular church of "St. Gregory the Great at Magliana Nuova", instituted by Pope John Paul II on 21 February 2001.

On 6 April 2014, church received the visit of Pope Francis.

== List of Cardinal Protectors ==
- Geraldo Majella Agnelo (21 February 2001 – 26 August 2023)
- Jaime Spengler (7 December 2024 –)
