= Franciscus de Campos Barreto =

Brazilian Roman Catholic prelate (1877–1941)

His Excellency Franciscus de Campos Barreto
- Campinas
- Native name: Francisco de Campos Barreto
- Metropolis: Archdiocese of Campinas
- Installed: 30 luglio 1920
- Term ended: 22 August 1941
- Predecessor: João Batista Correia Néri
- Successor: Paulo de Tarso Campos
- Previous post: Bishop of Pelotas (1921–1940)

Orders
- Ordination: 22 December 1900 by Antônio Cândido Alvarenga
- Consecration: 27 August 1911 by João Batista Correia Néri

Personal details
- Born: 28 March 1877 Sousas
- Died: 22 August 1941 (aged 64) Campinas
- Motto: Dominus regit me

Francisco de Campos Barreto (28 March 1877 – 22 August 1941) was a Brazilian Roman Catholic prelate. He was appointed bishop of Pelotas in 1911. He was appointed bishop of Campinas in 1920 and he died still in office in Campinas on 22 August 1941 at the age of 64.

Catholic Church titles
Preceded by -	Bishop of Pelotas; 1911–1920	Succeeded by Ioachimus Ferreira de Melo
Preceded by João Batista Correia Néri	Bishop of Campinas; 1920–1941	Succeeded by Paulo de Tarso Campos
