= Bruno Maldaner =

- Bishop of Frederico Westphalen
- Church: Catholic Church
- Diocese: Diocese of Frederico Westphalen
- In office: 27 May 1971 – 12 December 2001
- Predecessor: João Aloysio Hoffmann
- Successor: Zeno Hastenteufel
- Previous posts: Titular Bishop of Aquae in Mauretania (1966-1971); Auxiliary Bishop of São Paulo (1966-1971)

Orders
- Ordination: 8 December 1950
- Consecration: 29 June 1966 by Agnelo Rossi

Personal details
- Born: 4 August 1924 Nova Petrópolis, São Pedro do Rio Grande do Sul, Republic of the United States of Brazil
- Died: 16 November 2008 (aged 84)

Bruno Maldaner (4 August 1924 – 16 November 2008) was a Brazilian Bishop for the Catholic Church.

== Biography ==
Bruno Maldaner was born in the locality of Pinhal Alto, in Nova Petrópolis, Rio Grande do Sul, the son of Aloísio Maldaner and Adelina Hansen Maldaner. He studied at the seminaries of Gravataí and São Leopoldo, and at the Pontifical Gregorian University in Rome. He was ordained a priest in Rome on 8 December 1950, at the age of 26, and appointed Auxiliary Bishop of São Paulo, Brazil and Titular Bishop of Aquae in Mauretania on 15 April 1966. He was later appointed Bishop of Frederico Westphalen, Brazil on 27 May 1997. He retired in 2001.

Maldaner died on 16 November 2008.
