= Piratini =

Piratini may refer to:

- Piratini (city), in Rio Grande do Sul, Brazil
- Piratini River (São Gonçalo Channel), a river in Brazil
- Piratini River (Uruguay River tributary), a river in Brazil
- Piratini-class patrol boat, a class of Brazilian Navy boats
- Piratini Palace, the seat of Rio Grande do Sul government in Porto Alegre
- TV Piratini, a television station in Porto Alegre
- Piratini Republic (1836–1845), a historical state in today's Brazil
