= Roman Catholic Diocese of Rio Grande =

Catholic ecclesiastical territory

Diocese of Rio Grande Dioecesis Rivograndensis

Catholic
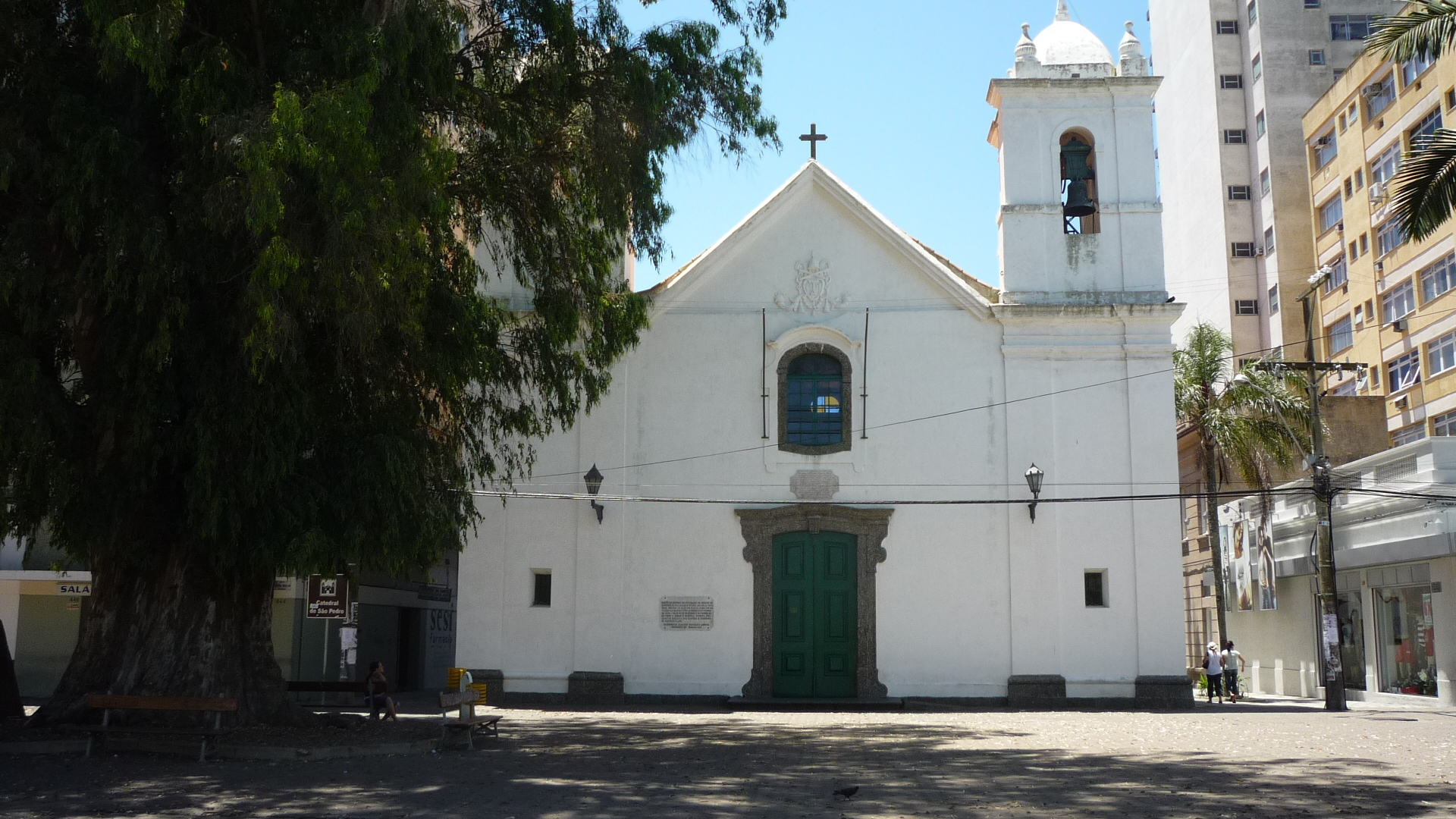
- Cathedral of St. Peter

Location
- Country: Brazil
- Ecclesiastical province: Pelotas

Statistics
- Area: 12,270 km^{2} (4,740 sq mi)
- Population: Total; Catholics: (as of 2014); 300,000; 211,000 (70.3%)

Information
- Rite: Latin Rite
- Established: 25 May 1971; 55 years ago
- Cathedral: Cathedral of St. Peter

Website
- www.diocesedoriogrande.com.br

The Diocese of Rio Grande (Portuguese: Diocese de Rio Grande, Latin: Dioecesis Rivograndensis) is a Roman Catholic diocese located in the city of Rio Grande in the ecclesiastical province of Pelotas in Brazil. The Diocese was established from the Diocese of Pelotas in 1971 and is located at the Cathedral of Saint Peter in Rio Grande.

== Bishops ==
1. Frederico Didonet (1971–1986)
2. José Mário Stroeher (1986–2016)
3. Ricardo Hoepers (2016–2023)
4. Jorge Pierozan [pt] (2024-Present)
