= Gravatal =

Coordinates: 28°20′S 49°02′W

- Municipality
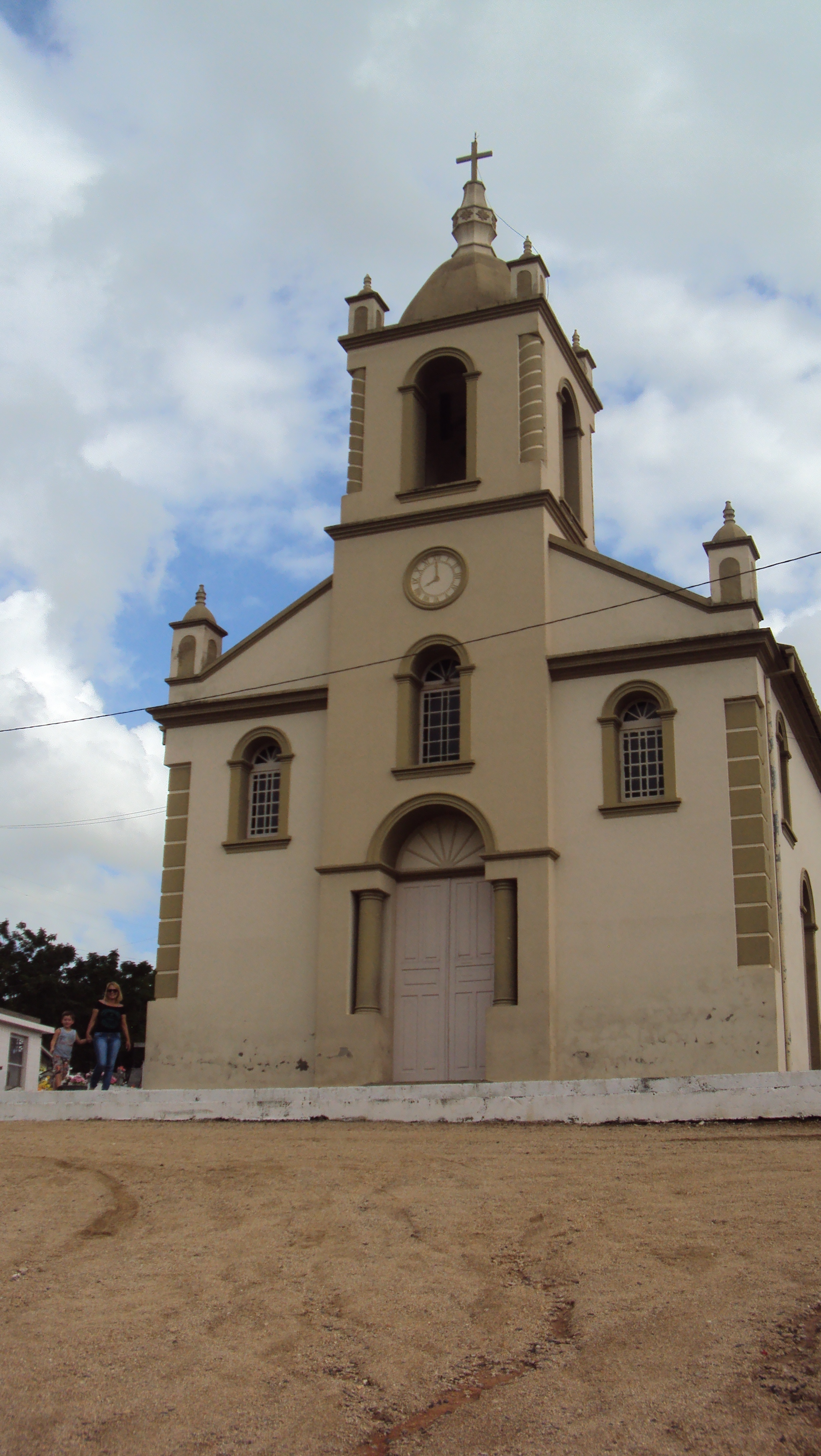

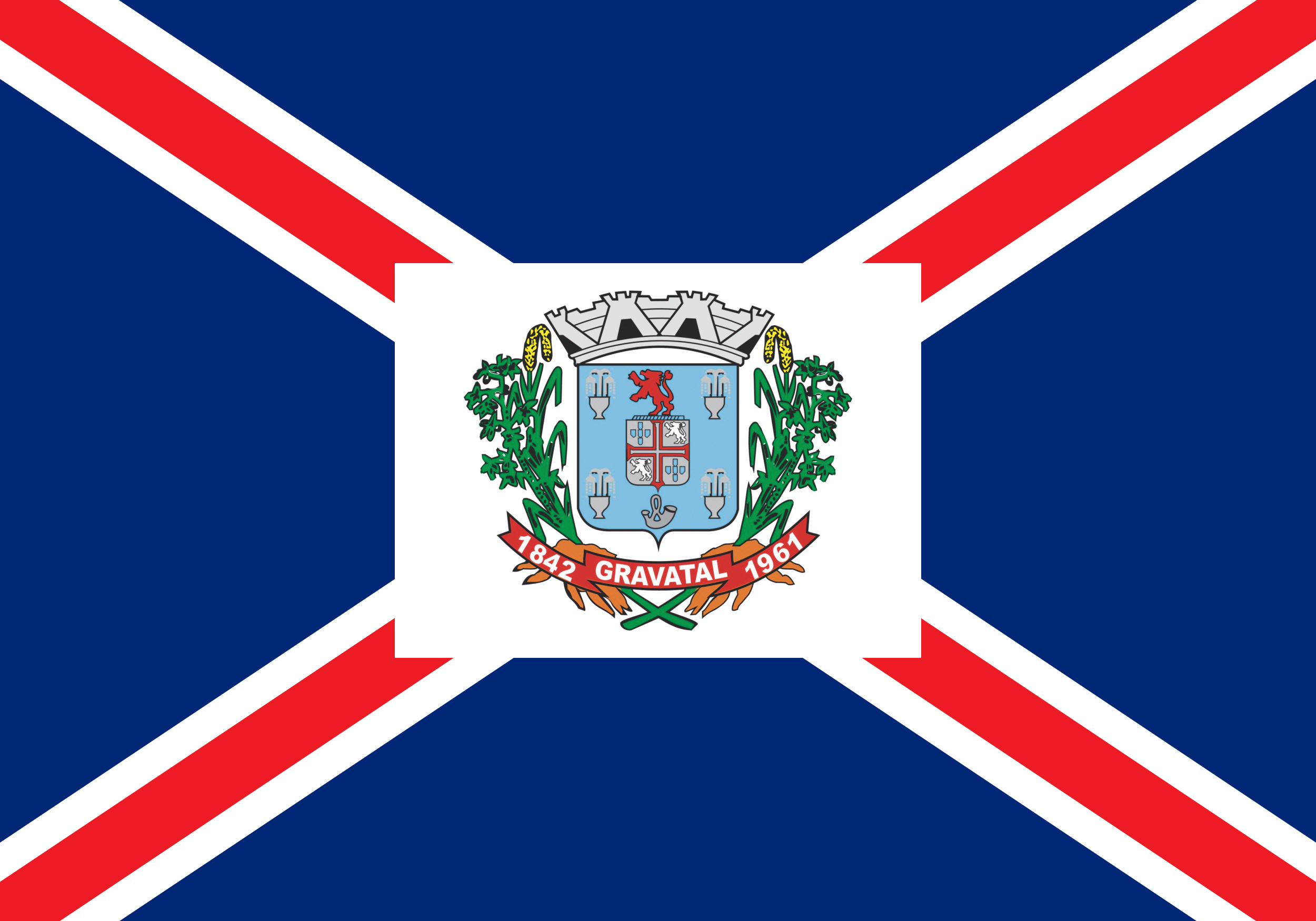
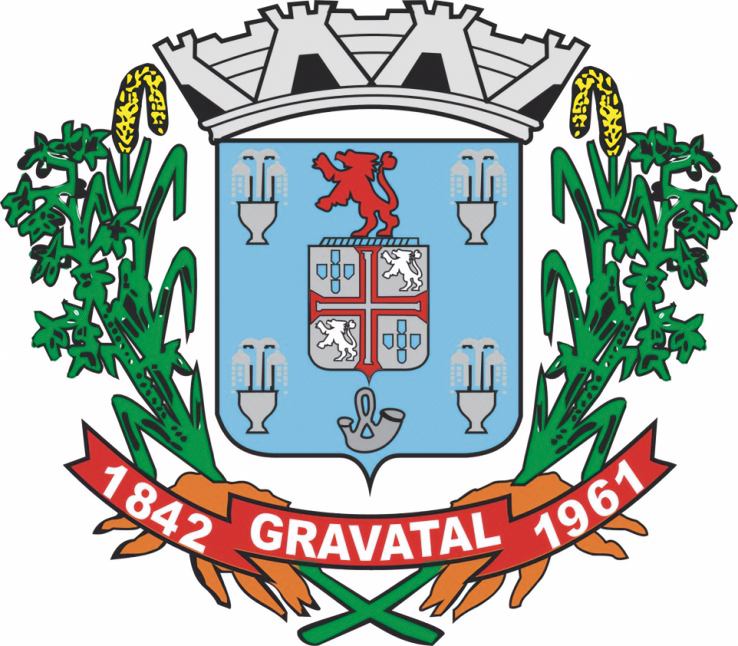
- Flag Coat of arms
- Interactive map of Gravatal
- Country: Brazil
- Region: South
- State: Santa Catarina
- Mesoregion: Sul Catarinense

Population (2020)
  - Total: 11,577
- Time zone: UTC -3
- Website: www.gravatal.sc.gov.br

Gravatal is a municipality in the state of Santa Catarina in the South Region, Brazil.

Located in a mountainous area, Gravatal has springs at 37 °C whose water it is divided supplies four local hotels and an aquatic complex. The spring water contains chemicals such as fluorine and lithium.

Approximately 2,000 people live in the region of the city where the spas are located; in July up to 50 thousand tourists visit the area.

== Culture ==
800 meters from the centre of the Gravatal, is 'Ecopark Termas' built to promote ideas for sustainable development and well-being. It is 17,000 m^{2}, within 7,500 m^{2} of preserved forest RPPN (private natural heritage reserve), located on Rua Antônio Pedro Mendonça.

== See also ==
- List of municipalities in Santa Catarina
