= Aloísio Sinésio Bohn =

Brazilian priest (1934–2022)

His Excellency Aloísio Sinésio Bohn
- Bishop Emeritus of Santa Cruz do Sul
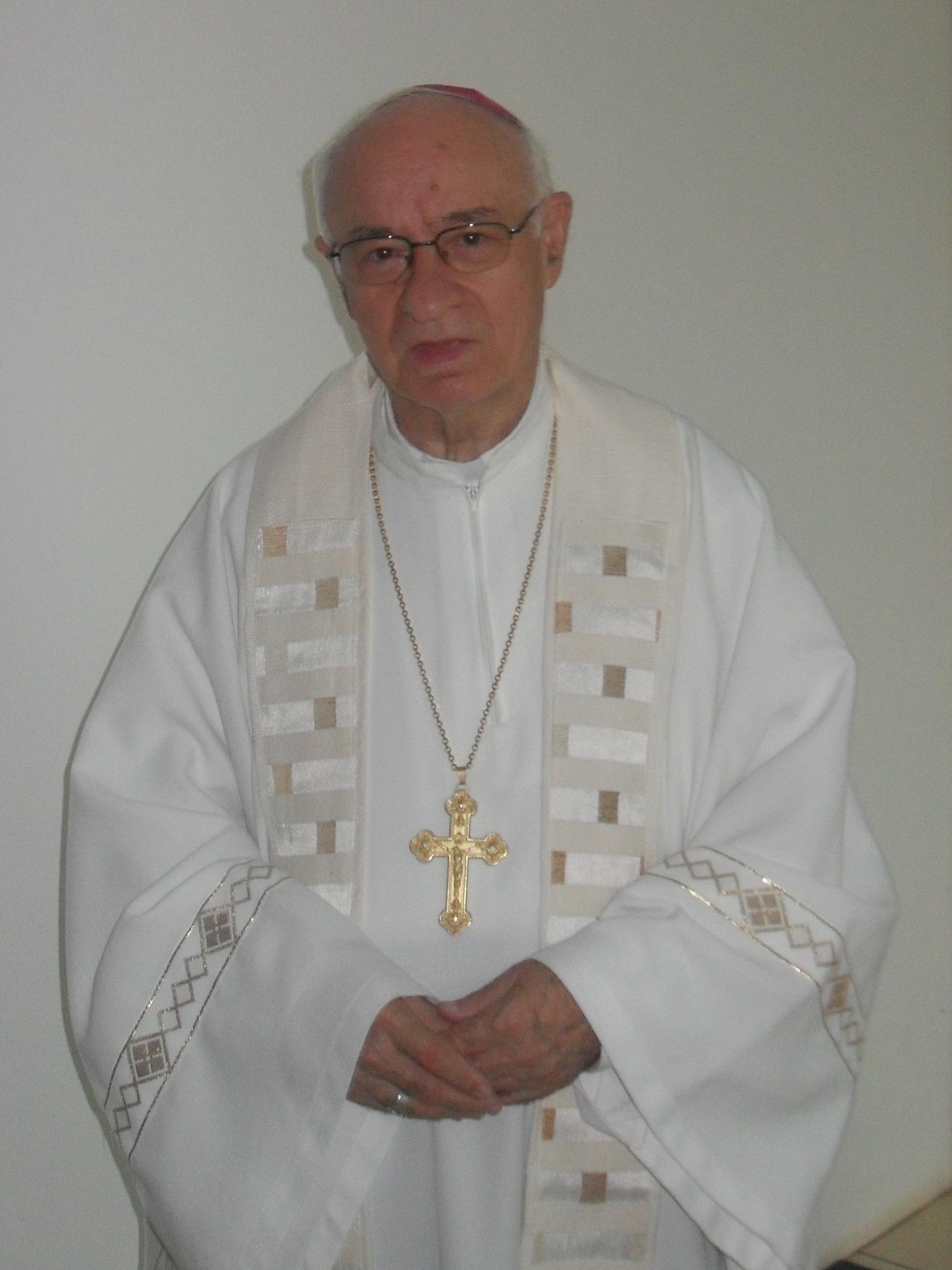
- Diocese: Santa Cruz do Sul
- Appointed: 27 June 1986
- Term ended: 19 May 2010
- Predecessor: Alberto Frederico Etges
- Successor: Canísio Klaus
- Other post: Titular Bishop of Abbir Germaniciana (1977–1980)
- Previous posts: Auxiliary Bishop of Brasília (1977–1980); Bishop of Novo Hamburgo (1980–1986)

Orders
- Ordination: 23 December 1961
- Consecration: 9 September 1977 by Alfredo Vicente Scherer

Personal details
- Born: 11 September 1934 Montenegro, Rio Grande do Sul, Brazil
- Died: 9 June 2022 (aged 87) Santa Cruz do Sul, Rio Grande do Sul, Brazil

Aloísio Sinésio Bohn (11 September 1934 – 9 June 2022) was a Brazilian Roman Catholic prelate.

Bohn was born in Brazil and was ordained to the priesthood in 1961. He served as titular bishop of Abbir Germaniciana and auxiliary bishop of the Roman Catholic Archdiocese of Brasilia, Brazil, from 1977 to 1980. He then served as bishop of the Roman Catholic Diocese of Novo Hamburgo, Brazil, from 1980 to 1986 and finally served as bishop of the Roman Catholic Diocese of Santa Cruz do Sul, Brazil from 1986 until his retirement in 2010.

Catholic Church titles
Preceded by Alberto Frederico Etges	Bishop of Santa Cruz do Sul; 1986–2010	Succeeded by Canísio Klaus
Preceded by Post created	Bishop of Novo Hamburgo; 1980–1986	Succeeded by Carlos José Boaventura Kloppenburg
Preceded by Paul Bouque	Titular Bishop of Abbir Germaniciana; 1977–1980	Succeeded by Hermann Josef Spital
Preceded by —	Auxiliary Bishop of Brasília; 1977–1980	Succeeded by —
