= Diocese of Santa Cruz do Sul =

Catholic ecclesiastical territory

Diocese of Santa Cruz do Sul Dioecesis Sanctae Crucis in Brasilia

Catholic
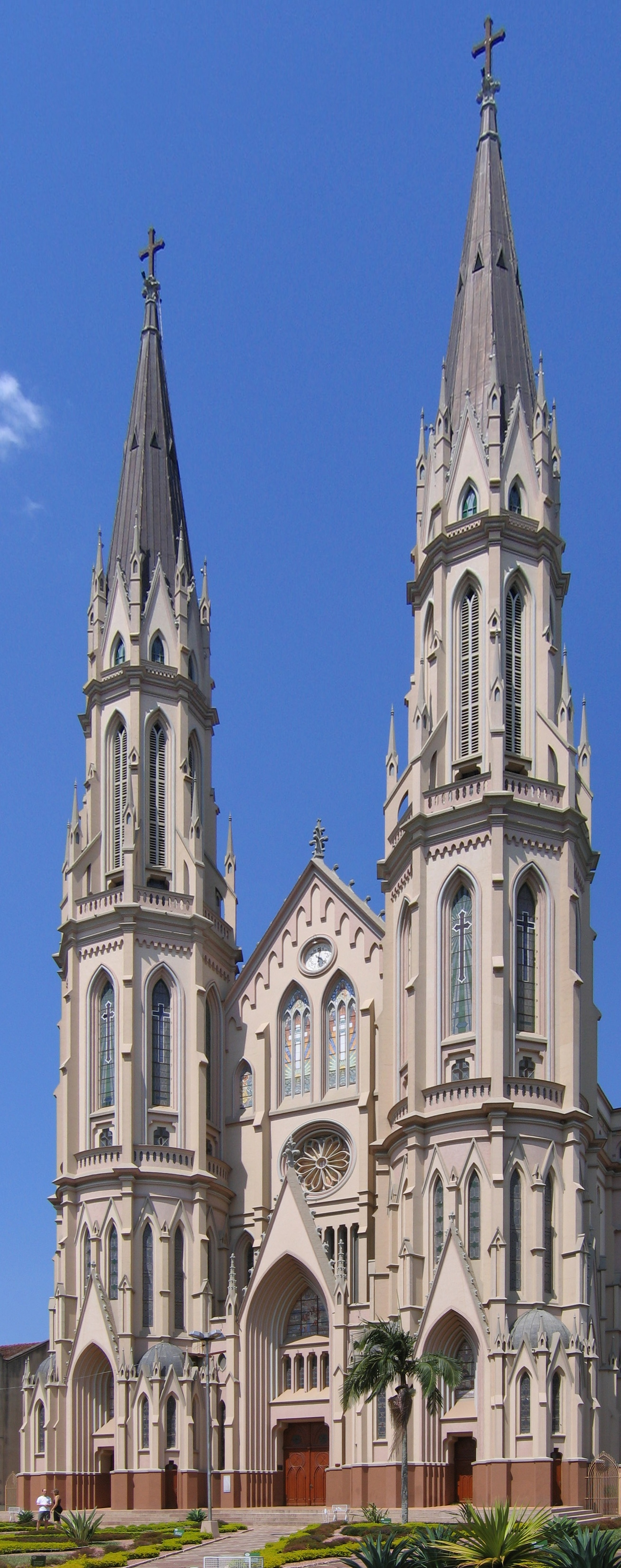
- Cathedral of St. John the Baptist

Location
- Country: Brazil
- Ecclesiastical province: Santa Maria

Statistics
- Area: 17,168 km^{2} (6,629 sq mi)
- Population: Total; Catholics: (as of 2004); 537,002; 447,502 (83.3%)

Information
- Denomination: Catholic Church
- Rite: Latin Rite
- Established: 20 June 1959 (67 years ago)
- Cathedral: Catedral São João Batista

Current leadership
- Pope: Leo XIV
- Bishop: Itacir Brassiani, M.S.F.
- Metropolitan Archbishop: Leomar Antônio Brustolin
- Bishops emeritus: Aloísio Alberto Dilli, O.F.M.

Website
- www.mitrascs.com.br

The Roman Catholic Diocese of Santa Cruz do Sul (Latin: Dioecesis Sanctae Crucis in Brasilia) is a diocese located in the city of Santa Cruz do Sul in the ecclesiastical province of Santa Maria in Brazil.

== History ==
- 20 June 1959: Established as Diocese of Santa Cruz do Sul from the Metropolitan Archdiocese of Porto Alegre

== Bishops ==
- Bishops of Santa Cruz do Sul (Roman rite)
  - Alberto Frederico Etges † (1 Aug 1959 – 27 Jun 1986), retired
  - Aloísio Sinésio Bohn (27 Jun 1986 – 19 May 2010), retired
  - Canísio Klaus (19 May 2010 – 20 Jan 2016), appointed Bishop of Sinop, Mato Grosso
  - Aloísio Alberto Dilli, O.F.M. (13 Jul 2016 – 19 Jun 2024), retired
  - Itacir Brassiani, M.S.F. (19 June 2024 – Present)

=== Other priests of this diocese who became bishops ===
- Paulo Antônio de Conto, appointed Bishop of São Luíz de Cáceres in 1991
- Gílio Felício, appointed Auxiliary Bishop of São Salvador da Bahia in 1998
