= Osório, Rio Grande do Sul =

Municipality of Rio Grande do Sul, Brazil

Osório
- Municipality
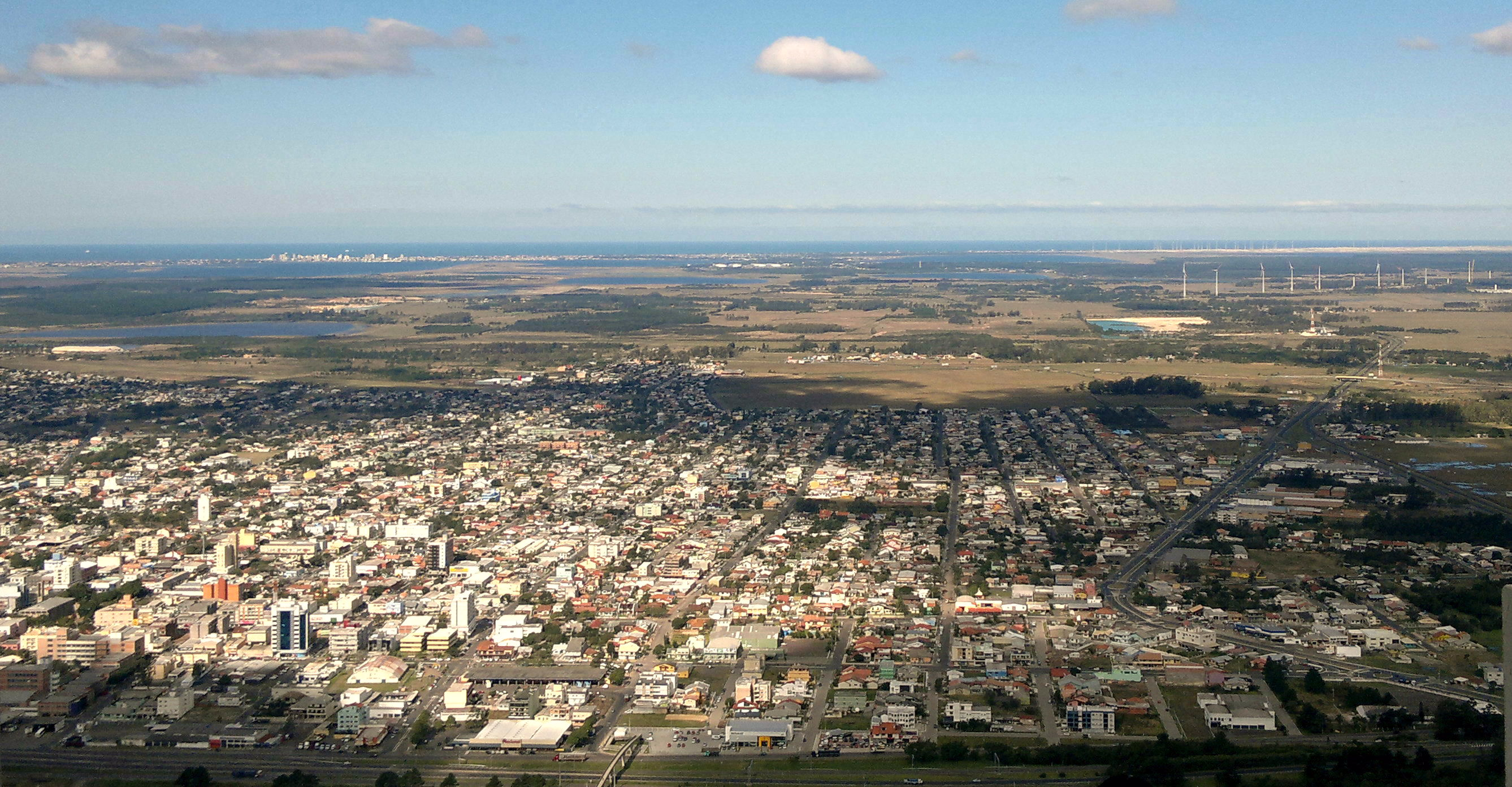
- View of Osório

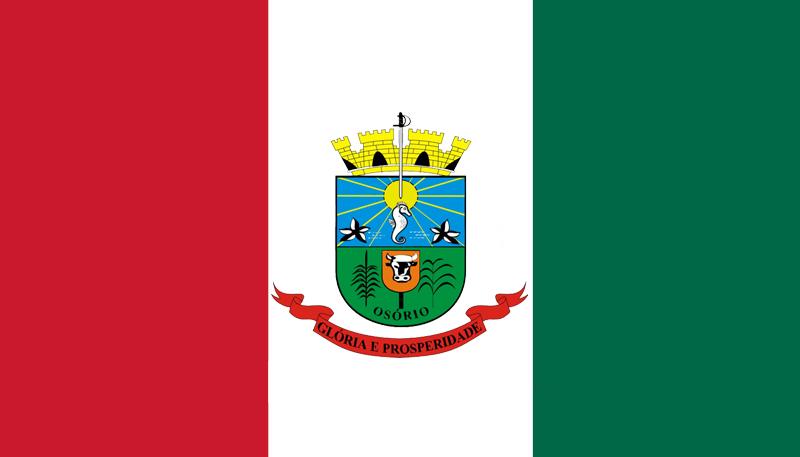
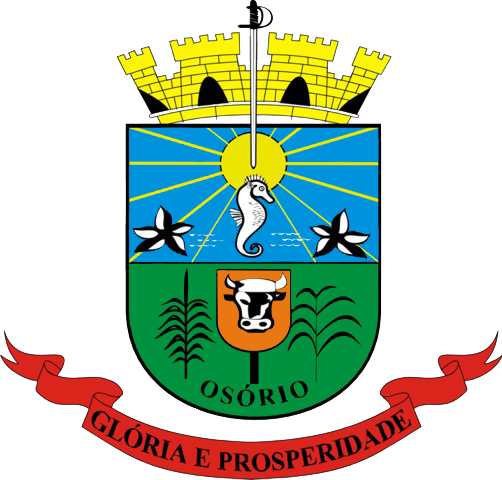
- Flag Coat of arms

- Location within Rio Grande do Sul

- Location in Brazil
- Coordinates: 29°53′39″S 50°15′55″W
- Country: Brazil
- State: Rio Grande do Sul

Population (2020)
  - Total: 46,414
- Time zone: UTC−3 (BRT)

Osório is a coastal municipality and a town in the state of Rio Grande do Sul. Its population is about 46,000 inhabitants.

Osório is located 90 km east of the state capital, Porto Alegre. The municipality was created in 1857 by fission from Santo Antonio da Patrulha and named Conceição do Arroio. It was renamed in 1934 by decree to honor Manuel Luís Osório, 19th century military commander and politician who was born there.

The Osório wind farm, the largest wind power park in Latin America (300MW) was built in 2006 in the outskirts of the town.

== See also ==
- List of municipalities in Rio Grande do Sul
