= Jaime Spengler =

Franciscan friar and Brazilian Catholic prelate

His Eminence Jaime Spengler OFM
- Cardinal, Archbishop of Porto Alegre
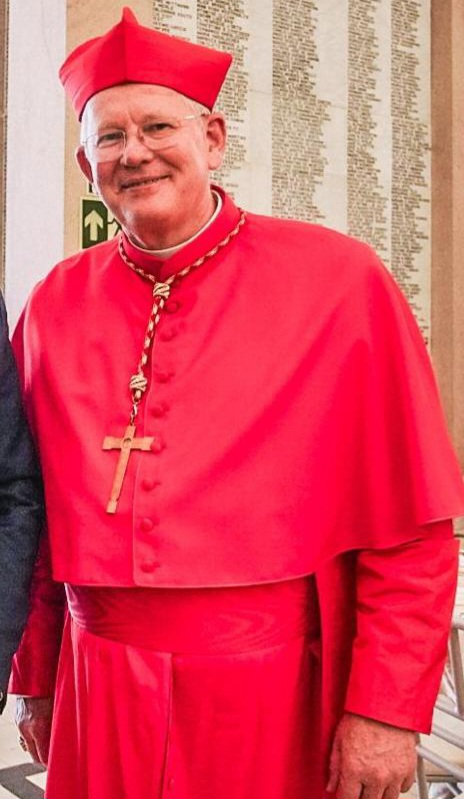
- Spengler in 2024
- Church: Catholic Church
- Archdiocese: Porto Alegre
- See: Porto Alegre
- Appointed: 18 September 2013
- Installed: 15 November 2013
- Predecessor: Dadeus Grings
- Other posts: President of the Brazilian Episcopal Conference (2023–); Cardinal-Priest of San Gregorio Magno alla Magliana Nuova (2024–)
- Previous posts: Titular bishop of Patara (2010–13); Auxiliary Bishop of Porto Alegre (2010–13)

Orders
- Ordination: 17 November 1990 by Quirino Adolfo Schmitz
- Consecration: 5 February 2011 by Lorenzo Baldisseri
- Created cardinal: 7 December 2024 by Pope Francis
- Rank: Cardinal-Priest

Personal details
- Born: Jaime Spengler; 6 September 1960 (age 66) Gaspar, Santa Catarina
- Motto: In Cruce Gloriari
- Coat of arms

Ordination history of Jaime Spengler
History
Priestly ordination
- Ordained by: Quirino Adolfo Schmitz
Episcopal consecration
- Principal consecrator: Lorenzo Baldisseri
- Co-consecrators: Dadeus Grings, Leonardo Ulrich Steiner
Episcopal succession
Bishops consecrated by Jaime Spengler as principal consecrator
- Leomar Antônio Brustolin: 2015
- Aparecido Donizete de Souza: 2016
- Silvio Guterres Dutra: 2018
- Darley José Kummer: 2019
- Maurício da Silva Jardim: 2022
- Juarez Albino Destro: 2023
- Odair Miguel Gonsalves dos Santos: 2023

Jaime Spengler, OFM (born 6 September 1960), is a Brazilian cardinal of the Catholic Church who has been the Archbishop of Porto Alegre since 2013. He has also served as president of the National Conference of Bishops of Brazil and the Latin American Episcopal Council (CELAM) since 2023. He is a member of the Order of Friars Minor. He was created a cardinal by Pope Francis on 7 December 2024.

== Biography ==
Jaime Spengler was born on 6 September 1960, in the city of Gaspar, in the state of Santa Catarina, the eldest of his parents' four children. He later joined the Order of Friars Minor and was ordained a Catholic priest on 17 November 1990.

On 10 November 2010, Pope Benedict XVI named him titular bishop of Patara and auxiliary bishop of the Archdiocese of Porto Alegre.

On 15 August 2012, Archbishop Dadeus Grings appointed him Attorney and Treasurer of the Archdiocese of Porto Alegre. Pope Francis appointed him archbishop of Porto Alegre on 18 September 2013. On 29 March 2014, Pope Francis named him a member of the Congregation for Institutes of Consecrated Life and Societies of Apostolic Life. On 1 June 2022, Pope Francis named him a member of the Congregation for Divine Worship and the Discipline of the Sacraments.

=== Episcopal Conference of Brazil ===
On 25 June 2011, he became a member of the Episcopal Pastoral Commission for Ordained Ministries and Consecrated Life of the Episcopal Conference of Brazil (CNBB).

On 23 April 2015, he was elected President of the CNBB South Regional 3 for the 2015–2019 term. On 24 April 2023, during the 60th General Assembly of the CNBB, he was elected president for the 2023–2027 term.

=== Cardinal ===
On 6 October 2024, Pope Francis announced that he planned to make Spengler a cardinal on 8 December, a date that was later changed to 7 December.

On 7 December 2024, Pope Francis made him a cardinal, assigning him as a member of the order of cardinal priests the title of San Gregorio Magno alla Magliana Nuova.

He participated as a cardinal elector in the 2025 papal conclave that elected Pope Leo XIV.

== See also ==
- Catholic Church in Brazil
- Cardinals created by Pope Francis
