= Archdiocese of Porto Alegre =

Latin Catholic archdiocese in Brazil

Archdiocese of Porto Alegre Archidioecesis Portalegrensis in Brasilia Arquidiocese de Porto Alegre

Catholic
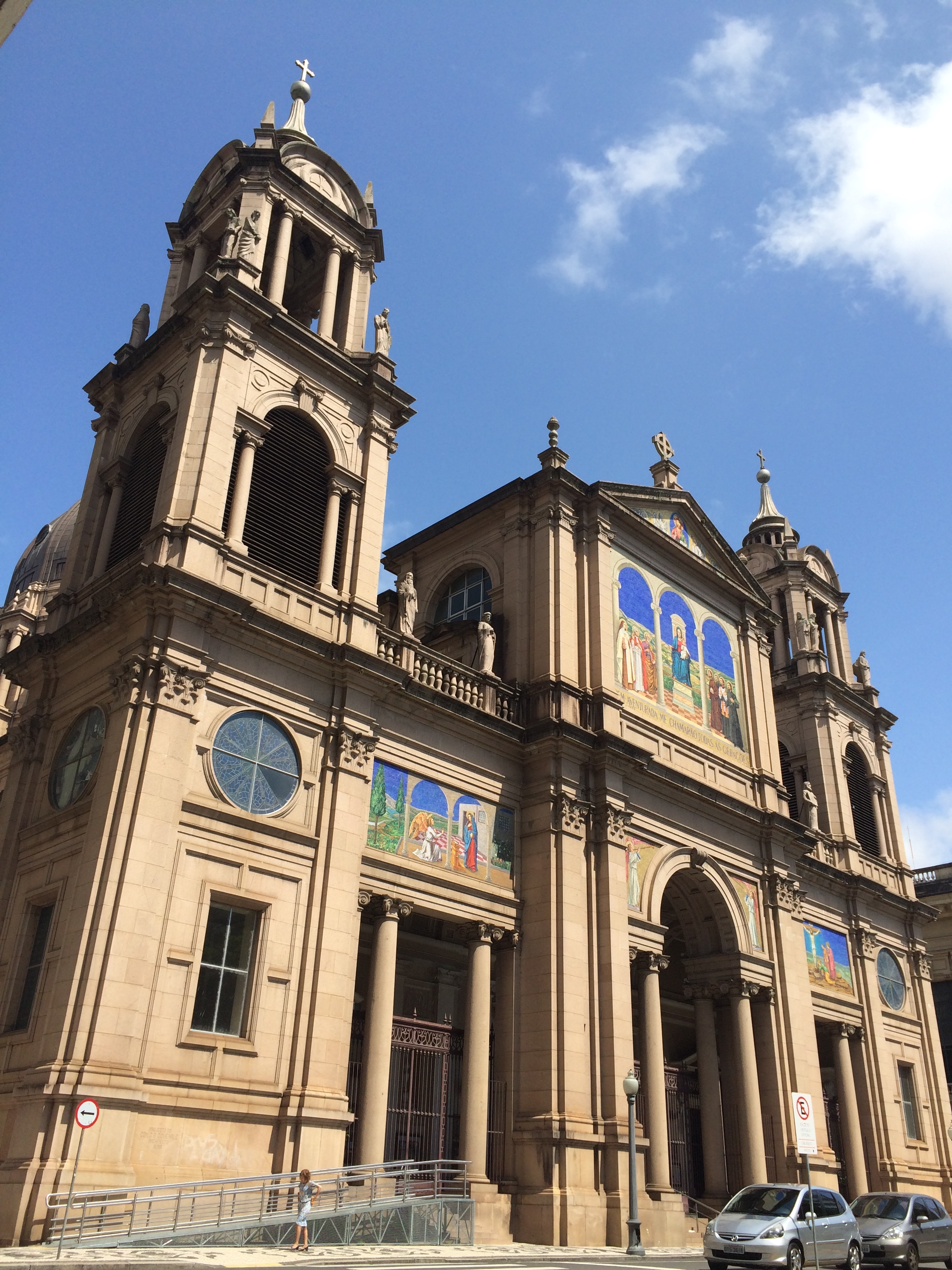
- Cathedral of Our Lady, Mother of God, Porto Alegre

- Coat of arms

Location
- Country: Brazil
- Territory: Porto Alegre, Rio Grande do Sul
- Ecclesiastical province: Porto Alegre

Statistics
- Area: 13,530 km^{2} (5,220 sq mi)
- Population: Total; Catholics: (as of 2013); 3,395,000; 2,527,000 (74.4%)
- Parishes: 156

Information
- Denomination: Catholic Church
- Sui iuris church: Latin Church
- Rite: Roman Rite
- Established: 7 May 1848 (178 years ago)
- Cathedral: Metropolitan Cathedral of Porto Alegre
- Patron saint: Saint Peter
- Secular priests: 362

Current leadership
- Pope: Leo XIV
- Archbishop: Jaime Spengler
- Auxiliary Bishops: Leomar Antônio Brustolin; Aparecido Donizete de Souza; Adilson Pedro Busin; Darley José Kummer
- Bishops emeritus: Dadeus Grings

Website
- arquidiocesepoa.org.br

The Archdiocese of Porto Alegre (Latin: Archidioecesis Portalegrensis in Brasilia) is a Latin Church metropolitan archdiocese of the Catholic Church in Rio Grande do Sul state, Brazil.

The archdiocese's cathedral is the Metropolitan Cathedral of Our Lady Mother of God in Porto Alegre. Archbishop Emeritus Dadeus Grings was succeeded by the incumbent, Archbishop Jaime Spengler, who was appointed on 18 September 2013 by Pope Francis, and installed on 15 November 2013.

== History ==
It was erected as the Diocese of São Pedro do Rio Grande by Pope Pius IX on 7 May 1848, on territory split off from the Diocese of São Sebastião do Rio de Janeiro.

On 15 August 1910, it was elevated by Pope Pius X to the rank of a Metropolitan archdiocese, having lost territories to establish the Diocese of Pelotas, the Diocese of Santa Maria, and the Diocese of Uruguaiana. On 8 September 1934, it lost territories to establish the Diocese of Caxias and the Territorial Prelature of Vacaria. On 18 January 1957, it gained territory back from the Territorial Prelature of Vacaria.

It lost territories on 20 June 1959 to establish the Diocese of Santa Cruz do Sul, on 15 August 1959 to the Diocese of Caxias, on 1 February 1971 to the Diocese of Caxias do Sul, on 2 February 1980 to establish the Diocese of Novo Hamburgo as its suffragan, on 10 November 1999 to establish the Diocese of Osorio as its suffragan, and on 2 July 2008 to establish the Diocese of Montenegro as its suffragan.

It received a papal visit from Pope John Paul II in July 1980.

== Statistics ==
In 2014, it pastorally served around 2,547,000 Catholics (74.4% of 3,423,000 total) on 13,530 km^{2} in 156 parishes and 739 missions with 359 priests (203 diocesan, 156 religious), 59 deacons, 1,450 lay religious (341 brothers, 1,109 sisters), and 44 seminarians.

== Ecclesiastical province ==
Besides administering his own Archbishopric, the Metropolitan supervises the following Suffragan Sees:

- Roman Catholic Diocese of Caxias do Sul
- Roman Catholic Diocese of Montenegro, its daughter
- Roman Catholic Diocese of Novo Hamburgo, its daughter
- Roman Catholic Diocese of Osório, its daughter

== Bishops ==
=== Suffragan Bishops of São Pedro do Rio Grande ===
- Feliciano Rodrigues de Araujo Prates (5 May 1851 – 27 May 1858)
- Sebastião Dias Laranjeira (28 September 1860 – 13 August 1888)
- Cláudio Gonçalves Ponce de Leon, CM (26 June 1890 – 15 August 1910), previously Bishop of Goiás, Brazil (13 May 1881 – 26 June 1890)
  - Coadjutor Bishop: João Antônio Pimenta (21 February 1906 – 7 March 1911), Titular Bishop of Pentacomia (21 February 1906 – 7 March 1911); next Bishop of Montes Claros, Brazil (7 March 1911 – 20 July 1943)

=== Coadjutor bishops ===
- João Antônio Pimenta (1906–1911)
- Altamiro Rossato, CSsR (1991–2001)
- Dadeus Grings (2000–2001)

== See also ==
- List of Catholic dioceses in Brazil
- Roman Catholicism in Brazil
- Mother Church of the Immaculate Conception (Viamão)
