= List of Catholic churches in Brazil =

This is a list of Catholic churches in Brazil.

== Cathedrals ==
See: List of cathedrals in Brazil

- Catedral de Nossa Senhora do Paraíso
- Cathedral Basilica of St. Louis Gonzaga
- Cathedral of Brasília
- Cathedral of Maringá
- Cathedral of Our Lady of Lourdes (Canela)
- Cathedral of Salvador
- Old Cathedral of Rio de Janeiro
- Rio de Janeiro Cathedral
- São Paulo Cathedral
- Sorocaba Metropolitan Cathedral
- Catedral de São Luís

== Basilicas ==
- Basílica de Nossa Senhora do Carmo (São Paulo)
- Basílica José de Anchieta
- Basilica of the National Shrine of Our Lady of Aparecida
- Basilica and Hermitage of Our Lady of Sorrows

== Chapels ==
- Capela de Santa Cruz (São Paulo)

== Other churches ==
- Candelária Church
- Church of Nosso Senhor do Bonfim, Salvador
- Church of Our Lady of Mercy (Novo Hamburgo)
- Church of Saint Francis of Assisi, Pampulha, Belo Horizonte
- Church of Saint Francis of Assisi (Ouro Preto)
- Church of Saints Cosme and Damião (Igarassu)
- Igreja da Ordem Terceira do Carmo (São Paulo)
- Igreja de Santa Rita de Cássia (Rio de Janeiro)
- Igreja de Santo Antônio (São Paulo)
- Igreja de São Cristóvão (São Paulo)
- Igreja do Imaculado Coração de Maria (São Paulo)
- Igreja Nossa Senhora da Consolação (São Paulo)
- Igreja Nossa Senhora da Glória (Sergipe)
- Igreja Nossa Senhora do Brasil
- Our Lady of Navigators church (Porto Alegre)
- Paróquia Nossa Senhora Achiropita
- Paróquia Nossa Senhora Aparecida dos Ferroviários
- Paróquia Nossa Senhora de Lourdes (São Paulo)
- Paróquia Nossa Senhora de Montevirgem e São Luiz Gonzaga
- Paróquia Nossa Senhora do Bom Conselho
- Paróquia Santa Rita de Cássia
- Paróquia Santa Teresinha (São Paulo)
- Paróquia Santo Ivo (São Paulo)
- Paróquia São José do Belém
- Paróquia São Paulo Apóstolo
- Primeira Igreja Batista em Vila Silvia
- Santo Antônio do Rio Abaixo Main Church
- São Francisco Church and Convent

== See also ==
- List of Roman Catholic dioceses in Brazil
