= Timeline of São Paulo =

The following is a timeline of the history of the city of São Paulo, Brazil.

== Prior to 20th century ==
- 1554 – Jesuit Pátio do Colégio founded in São Paulo dos Campos de Piratininga.
- 1560 – Municipal Chamber of São Paulo founded.
- 1681 – Seat of Portuguese colonial Captaincy of São Vicente relocated to São Paulo from São Vicente.
- 1710 – São Paulo becomes capital of Captaincy of São Paulo and Minas de Ouro.
- 1720 – São Paulo becomes capital of Captaincy of São Paulo.
- 1745 – Catholic Diocese of São Paulo established.
- 1822 – São Paulo becomes part of the Empire of Brazil.
- 1827 – Faculdade de Direito do Largo de São Francisco, oldest Law School in Brazil, founded.
- 1831 – São Paulo Municipal Imperial Guard established.
- 1836 – Irmandade da Nossa Senhora dos Remedios (religious society) founded.
- 1854 – Correio Paulistano newspaper begins publication.
- 1858 – Cemitério da Consolação established.
- 1867 – São Paulo Railway begins operating.
- 1871 – American School founded.
- 1872 - Population: 31,385.
- 1875 – Provincia de S. Paulo newspaper begins publication.
- 1878 – German school founded.
- 1884 – Diário Popular newspaper begins publication.
- 1890
  - São Paulo Stock Exchange founded.
  - O Estado de S. Paulo newspaper in publication.
  - Population: 64,934.
- 1891 – Paulista Avenue inaugurated.
- 1893
  - Polytechnic School founded.
  - Population: 130,775.
- 1894 - Instituto Histórico Paulista founded.
- 1895 – Capela de Santa Cruz (church) built.
- 1897 – Paróquia São José do Belém (church) established.
- 1899 – Antônio da Silva Prado becomes first mayor.
- 1900
  - Municipal Works Department created.
  - Population: 239,620.
  - Guilherme Gaensly photo studio in business.

== 20th century ==
=== 1900s-1950s ===
- 1901 – Luz Station built.
- 1905 – Workers' Federation of São Paulo founded.
- 1906
  - Conservatório Dramático e Musical de São Paulo founded.
  - Igreja de Nossa Senhora do Rosário dos Homens Pretos (São Paulo) (church) built.
- 1910 – Sport Club Corinthians Paulista formed.
- 1911 – Municipal Theatre opens.
- 1914 – Palestra Italia football club formed.
- 1915 – City zones created (central, urban, suburban, rural).
- 1916 – Avenida Rebouças opens.
- 1917 – Labor strike.
- 1919 – Nacional Atlético Clube (football team) and Japan Club established.
- 1920
  - Carandiru Penitentiary built.
  - Population: 579,033.
- 1922
  - Brooklin Novo neighborhood established.
  - Modern Art Week occurs.
- 1924 – São Paulo Revolt of 1924.
- 1926 – Monument to the Independence of Brazil erected.
- 1928 – Casa Modernista (rua Santa Cruz) (residence) built.
- 1929 – Beth-el Synagogue built.
- 1930
  - São Paulo Futebol Clube formed.
  - Avenues Plan (urban plan) presented.
- 1932 – 9 July: São Paulo Constitutional Revolution begins.
- 1933 – Mercado Municipal Paulistano built.
- 1934
  - University of São Paulo established.
  - Marco Zero milestone installed in Praça da Sé.
  - Colégio Bandeirantes de São Paulo (school) opens.
- 1936 – São Paulo–Congonhas Airport opens.
- 1938
  - Estádio Nicolau Alayon (stadium) opens.
  - Francisco Prestes Maia becomes mayor.
- 1939 – Paróquia Nossa Senhora de Lourdes (church) established.
- 1940
  - Japanese Chamber of Commerce established.
    - Population: 1,326,261.
- 1941 – Paulista Equestrian Society established.
- 1943 – Ipiranga Cinema opens.
- 1947
  - Rodovia Anchieta (highway) and São Paulo Museum of Art open.
  - Altino Arantes Building constructed.
- 1949 – Cemitério de Vila Formosa and Companhia Cinematográfica Vera Cruz established.
- 1950
  - TV Tupi begins television broadcasting.
  - Population: 2,017,025.
- 1951 – São Paulo Art Biennial begins.
- 1954
  - São Paulo Cathedral consecrated.
  - Ibirapuera Park and Orquestra Sinfônica do Estado de São Paulo (symphony) established.
- 1955 – Obelisk of São Paulo inaugurated.
- 1958 – São Paulo Zoo opens near city.

=== 1960s-1990s ===
- 1960
  - Mirante do Vale built.
  - Population: 2,781,446.
  - Folha de S. Paulo newspaper in publication.
  - Favela Quarto de Despejo diary of Carolina Maria de Jesus published.
- 1963
  - 1963 Pan American Games held in São Paulo.
  - Notícias Populares newspaper begins publication.
  - Museum of Contemporary Art, University of São Paulo established.
- 1965 – Edifício Itália built.
- 1966
  - Gazeta cinema opens.
  - Iguatemi Faria Lima shopping mall in business on Brigadeiro Faria Lima Avenue.
  - Jornal da Tarde newspaper begins publication.
- 1967 – Exame magazine headquartered in city.
- 1968
  - Plan for Integrated Development of São Paulo presented.
  - Veja magazine headquartered in city.
- 1969 – Palácio Anchieta (city hall) inaugurated.
- 1970
  - Marginal Pinheiros (highway) opens.
  - Centro Cultural da Penha and Minhocão elevated highway built.
  - São Paulo Museum of Image and Sound established.
  - Convention Center opens in Santana.
  - Population: 5,186,752 city; 5,869,966 urban agglomeration.
- 1971 – Hilton hotel in business.
- 1974
  - Line 1 (São Paulo Metro) begins operating.
  - Rodovia dos Imigrantes (highway) opens.
  - Paróquia Nossa Senhora do Bom Conselho (church) built.
  - Japanese archway erected in Liberdade.
- 1977
  - São Paulo International Film Festival begins.
  - Jabaquara Intermunicipal Terminal opens.
- 1978
  - the first Latter Day Saints temple in South America is founded in São Paulo, as part of the church’s effort to expand the Latino Mormon community
- 1979
  - Line 3 (São Paulo Metro) begins operating.
  - Teatro Lira Paulistana inaugurated.
  - Bandeirantes landfill opens near city.
- 1980
  - Workers' Party headquartered in São Paulo.
  - Population: 8,493,226.
- 1982 – Tietê Bus Terminal opens.
- 1983 – April: Economic unrest.
- 1985 – Delegacias de Defense da Mulher (women's police station) established.
- 1987 – Braudel Institute of World Economics and Instituto Itaú Cultural established.
- 1989 – Latin America Memorial complex inaugurated.
- 1990 – Center for Education and Development of Health Care Workers of São Paulo established.
- 1991
  - Line 2 (São Paulo Metro) begins operating.
  - Anhembi Sambadrome opens.
  - Population: 9,626,894.
- 1992
  - October: Carandiru prison riot and crackdown.
  - São João landfill opens.
  - Companhia Paulista de Trens Metropolitanos established.
- 1993
  - Annablume Editora (publisher) established.
  - Population: 9,842,059 (estimate).
- 1995
  - São Paulo Fashion Week begins.
  - Plaza Centenário hi-rise built.
- 1997
  - São Paulo Gay Pride Parade begins.
  - Celso Pitta becomes mayor.
- 1999
  - D.O.M. (restaurant) in business.
  - Credicard Hall and Sala São Paulo (concert hall) open.
- 2000
  - Torre Norte built.
  - Mayor Celso Pitta ousted, then reinstated.

== 21st century ==
=== 2000s ===
- 2002
  - Line 5 (São Paulo Metro) begins operating.
  - Casa das Áfricas founded.
- 2003 – Lapa Terminal opens.
- 2005 – E-Tower and Ibirapuera Auditorium built.
- 2006
  - May 2006 São Paulo violence.
  - Gilberto Kassab becomes mayor.
- 2007
  - Eldorado Business Tower built.
  - Population: 10,886,518.
  - 25 March: Ocupa Mauá begins in the former Hotel Santos Dumont.
- 2008
  - Octávio Frias de Oliveira Bridge opens.
  - Cidade Jardim shopping mall in business.
  - Itaú Unibanco (bank) headquartered in city.
- 2009 – November: Blackout.

=== 2010s ===
- 2010
  - Line 4 (São Paulo Metro) begins operating.
  - Ciclovia Rio Pinheiros (bike path) opens.
  - Trucks banned on Bandeirantes Avenue weekdays.
  - Population: 11,253,503 city; 19,889,559 in Greater São Paulo.
  - Area of city: 588 square miles.
- 2011 – Hi-rise Edifício São Vito demolished.
- 2012 – October: São Paulo 2012 municipal election held.
- 2013
  - Fernando Haddad becomes mayor.
  - Company Business Towers built.
  - Protests against bus fare rises begin in the city.
- 2014
  - Line 15 (São Paulo Metro) begins operating.
  - Allianz Parque arena and Arena Corinthians open.
  - Temple of Solomon replica built.
- 2016 - 2 October: São Paulo mayoral election, 2016 held.
- 2018 - Edifício Wilton Paes de Almeida, an abandoned high-rise building home to squatters catches fire and collapses, killing at least one person.

== See also ==
- São Paulo history
- History of São Paulo
- List of mayors of São Paulo

Other cities in Brazil:

- Timeline of Brasília
- Timeline of Curitiba
- Timeline of Fortaleza
- Timeline of Manaus
- Timeline of Recife
- Timeline of Rio de Janeiro
- Timeline of Salvador, Bahia

== Bibliography ==
Published in the 19th century

- John Mawe (1812), "Description of St. Paul's", Travels in the Interior of Brazil, London: Longman, Hurst, Rees, Orme, and Brown
- Josiah Conder (1830), "Santo Paulo", The Modern Traveller, London: J.Duncan
- J.C.R. Milliet de Saint-Adolphe (1863), "São Paulo", Diccionario geographico, historico e descriptivo, do imperio do Brazil (in Portuguese), Paris: J. P. Aillaud, hdl:2027/wu.89006303077 – via HathiTrust
- Michael George Mulhall; E.T. Mulhall (1877). "San Paulo". Handbook of Brazil. Buenos Ayres. hdl:2027/mdp.39015014192523.

Published in the 20th century

- Ernst B. Filsinger (1922), "Brazil: São Paulo", Commercial Travelers' Guide to Latin America, Washington, D.C.: Government Printing Office
- "São Paulo". Collier's Encyclopedia. New York: P.F. Collier & Son. 1928. hdl:2027/mdp.39015073301890.
- "As São Paulo Grows", National Geographic Magazine, vol. 75, Washington, D.C., 1939
- "Local History, Brazil: São Paulo". Catalog of the William B. Greenlee Collection of Portuguese History ... in the Newberry Library. Chicago: Newberry Library. 1953. hdl:2027/mdp.39015023946240 – via HathiTrust.
- Richard M. Morse. From Community to Metropolis: A Biography of São Paulo, Brazil. (New York, 1974)
- John D. Wirth and Robert Lee Jones, ed. (1978). Manchester and São Paulo: Problems of Rapid Urban Growth. Stanford University Press. ISBN 978-0-8047-1005-3.
- Elizabeth Kuznesof. Household Economy and Urban Development, São Paulo, 1765 to 1836 (Boulder, CO: Westview, 1986)
- Yvonne Corcoran-Nantes (1990). "Women and Popular Urban Social Movements in São Paulo, Brazil". Bulletin of Latin American Research. 9 (2): 249–264. doi:10.2307/3338472. JSTOR 3338472.
- George Reid Andrews (1991). Blacks & Whites in São Paulo, Brazil, 1888-1988. University of Wisconsin Press. ISBN 978-0-299-13104-3.
- Teresa Pires do Rio Caldeira (2000). City of Walls: Crime, Segregation, and Citizenship in São Paulo. University of California Press. ISBN 978-0-520-22143-7.

Published in the 21st century

- "São Paulo". Understanding Slums: Case Studies for the Global Report 2003. United Nations Human Settlements Programme and University College London. 2003.
- Maria Helena Moreira Alves (2004). "São Paulo: the political and socioeconomic transformations wrought by the new labour movement in the city and beyond". In Josef Gugler (ed.). World Cities Beyond the West: Globalization, Development and Inequality. Cambridge University Press. ISBN 978-0-521-53685-1.
- Simon Romero (22 February 2004), "At 450, São Paulo Is Full of Energy", New York Times
- Anne G. Hanley (2005). Native Capital: Financial Institutions and Economic Development in São Paulo, Brazil, 1850-1920. Stanford University Press. ISBN 978-0-8047-5072-1.
- Ray Hutchison, ed. (2009). "São Paulo". Encyclopedia of Urban Studies. Sage. ISBN 978-1-4522-6613-8.
- Cristina Peixoto-Mehrtens (2010). Urban Space and National Identity in Early Twentieth Century São Paulo, Brazil. Palgrave Macmillan. ISBN 978-0-230-11403-6.
- Renato Luiz Sobral Anelli (2012), Urban Planning, Urban Design & Architectural Design In São Paulo During The Military Regime – via International Planning History Society (also many papers about São Paulo at same website)
- Carl A. Zimring, ed. (2012). "São Paulo". Encyclopedia of Consumption and Waste. Sage. ISBN 978-1-4522-6667-1.
