= Terço dos Homens =

Brazilian lay Catholic movement

Terço dos Homens ('Men's Rosary') is a Brazilian lay Catholic movement of Marian prayer by men only.

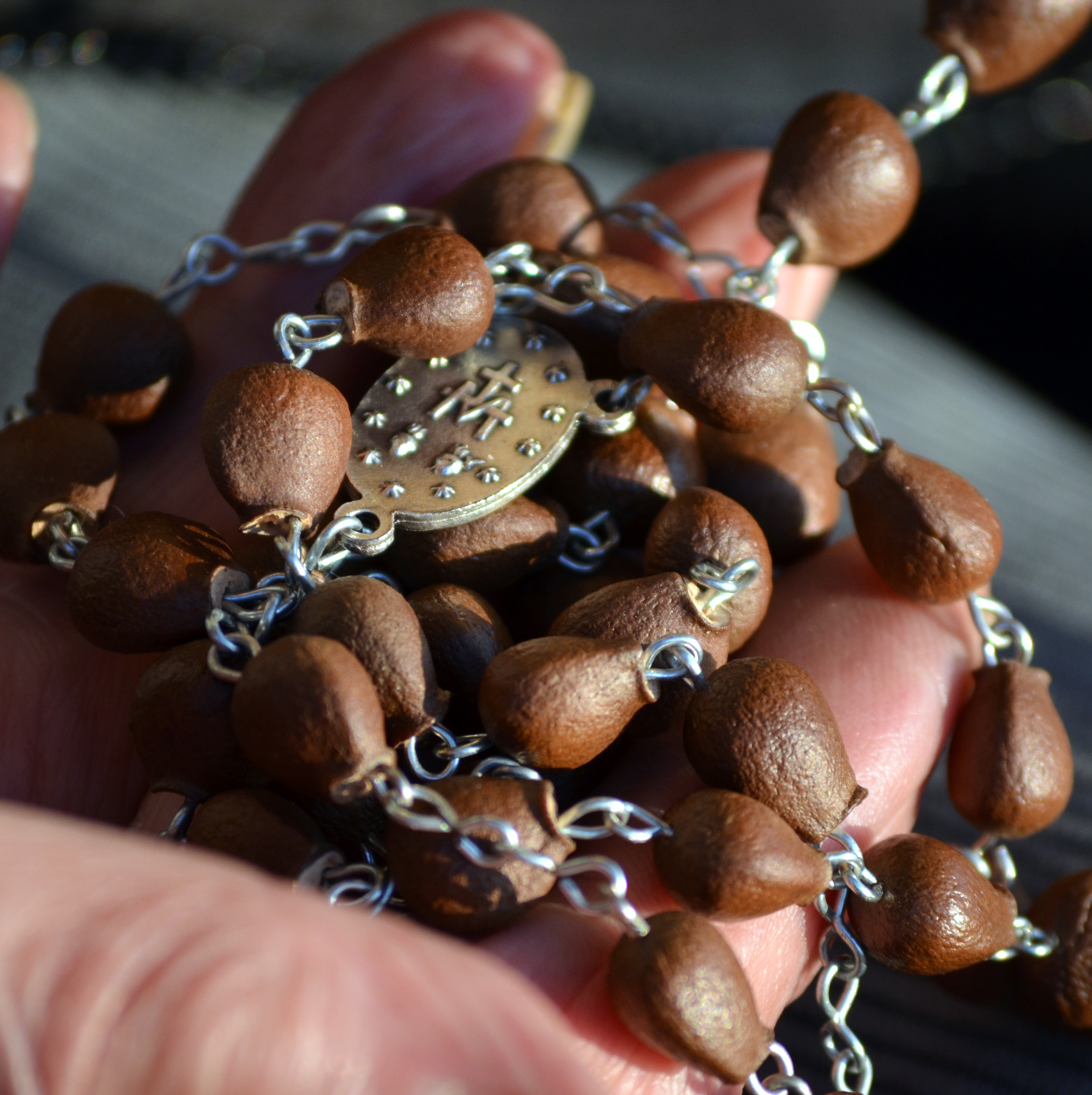
A wooden Rosary.

It consists in groups of local men who engage in group praying of the mysteries of the Rosary weekly at their parishes or community centers.

The movement grew with the help of priests from the Schoenstatt Apostolic Movement.

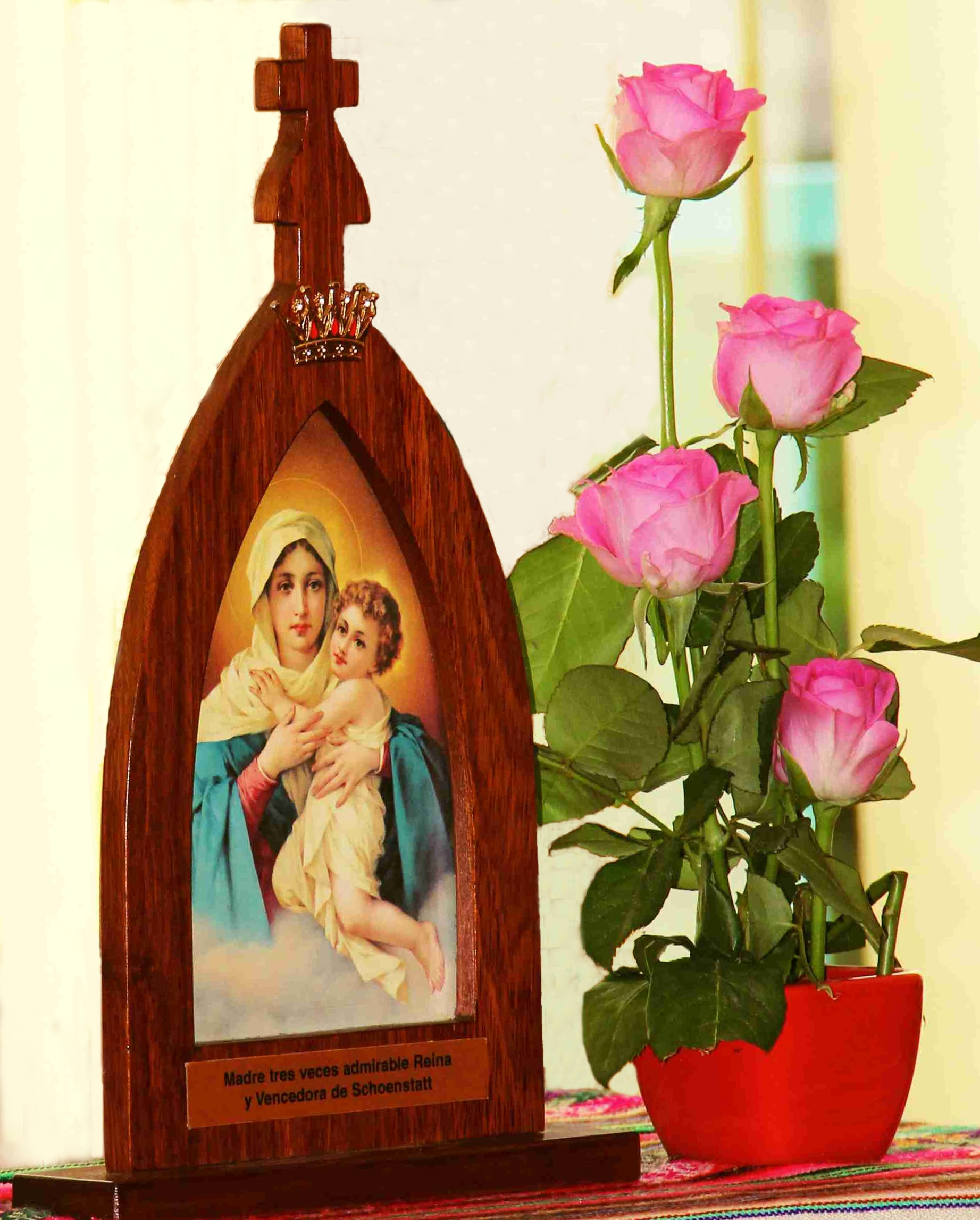
Our Lady Thrice Admirable of Schoenstatt.

The priest who is the national responsible for the movement is the Archbishop of Juiz de Fora, Gil Antônio Moreira, according to the Brazilian Episcopal Conference (CNBB).

== History ==
Since the 1500s there have been manly Marian groups of prayer in Brazil. The modern expression "Terço dos Homens" (Men's Rosary) was noticed for the first time in 1936. The 21st century "wave", however, started only in 1996, in Jaboatão dos Guararapes, Recife metropolitan area, in the state of Pernambuco. From there it established in the nearby Olinda Sanctuary, from where it spread to all 26 states of Brazil and the Federal District.

=== Women's version ===
The prayer of the Rosary is traditionally associated with women, who pray individually in their homes and parishes. However, a women's movement was founded, based on the good male example of prayer that developed. This Rosary women's prayer movement is called the Terço das Mulheres (Women's Rosary). The anthem of the movement was composed by Adriana Gil. The first pilgrimage of female tercistas to the National Sanctuary of Aparecida took place in 2014. In 2023 the 10th edition of the pilgrimage took place from 10 to 12 March.

== Annual meetings ==
=== National meeting ===
Every year, in February, the movement gathers at the Basilica of Our Lady of Aparecida.

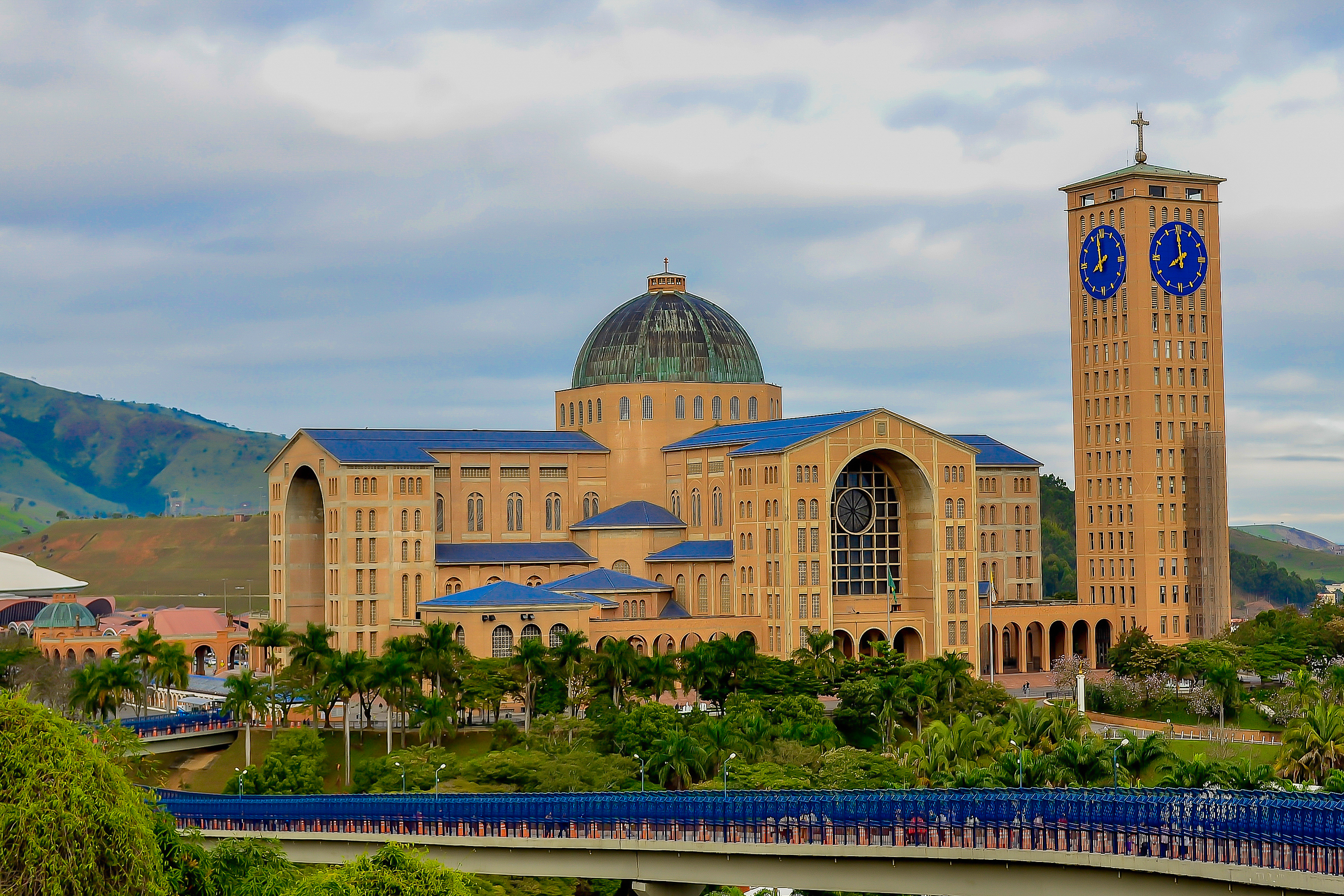
Every year, in February, the movement gathers at the Basilica of Our Lady of Aparecida.

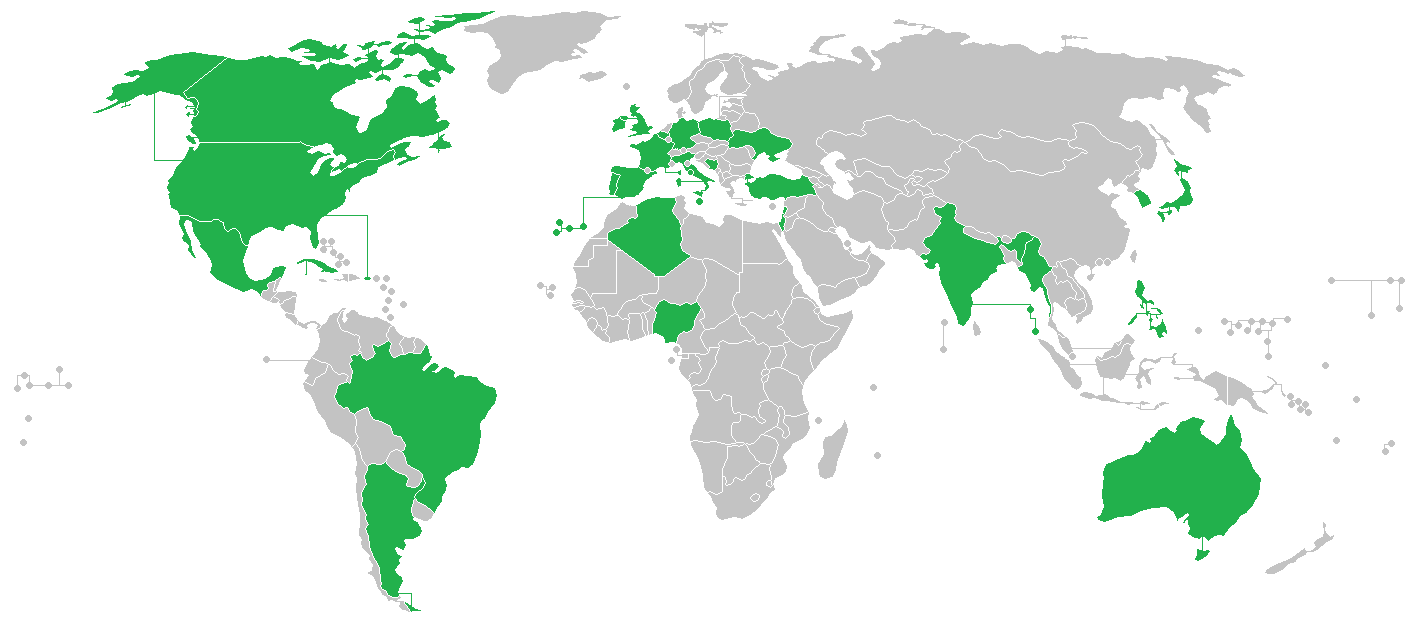
Countries where at least one Roman Catholic sanctuary offered a public Rosary for the end of the COVID-19 pandemic.

=== State meetings ===
Southeast region

- Espírito Santo: last Saturday in May at the Penha Convent, in Vitória.

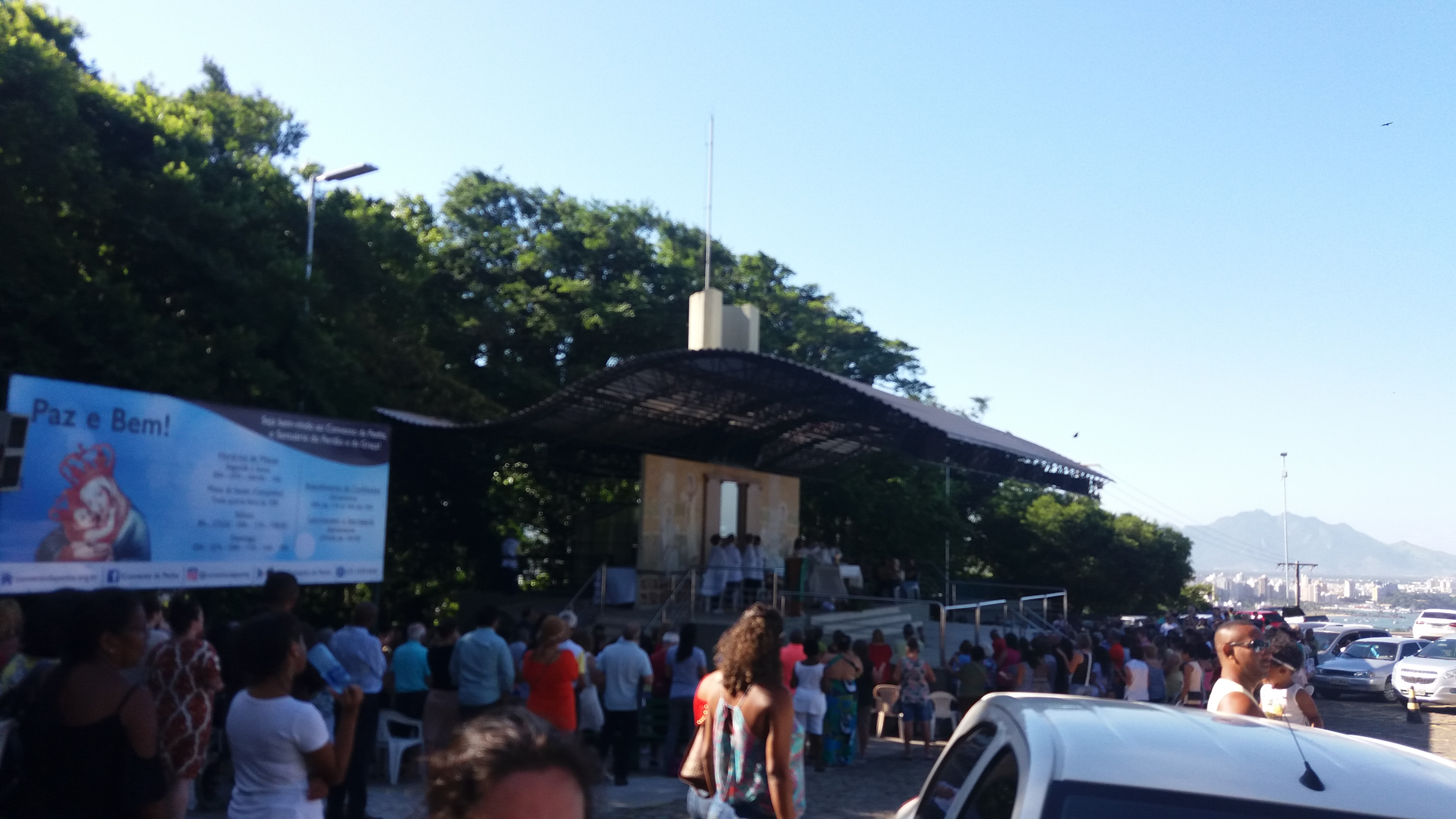
Penha Convent. Vitória, Espírito Santo.

- Minas Gerais: end of August or early September at the Our Lady of Sorrows Basilica, in Caeté. There is also an annual meeting at the Greater Belo Horizonte.

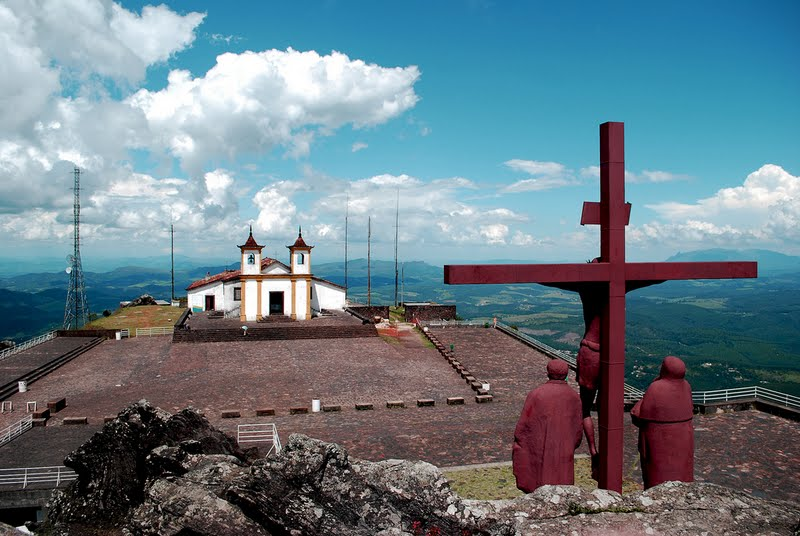
Our Lady of Sorrows Basilica. Caeté, Minas Gerais.

Northeastern region

- Maranhão: last Sunday in April.
- Pernambuco: 5 March.
- Bahia: Divine Mercy Sunday.

South region

- Paraná and Santa Catarina: at the highland of Southern Paraná and Northern Santa Catarina, at the end of September.

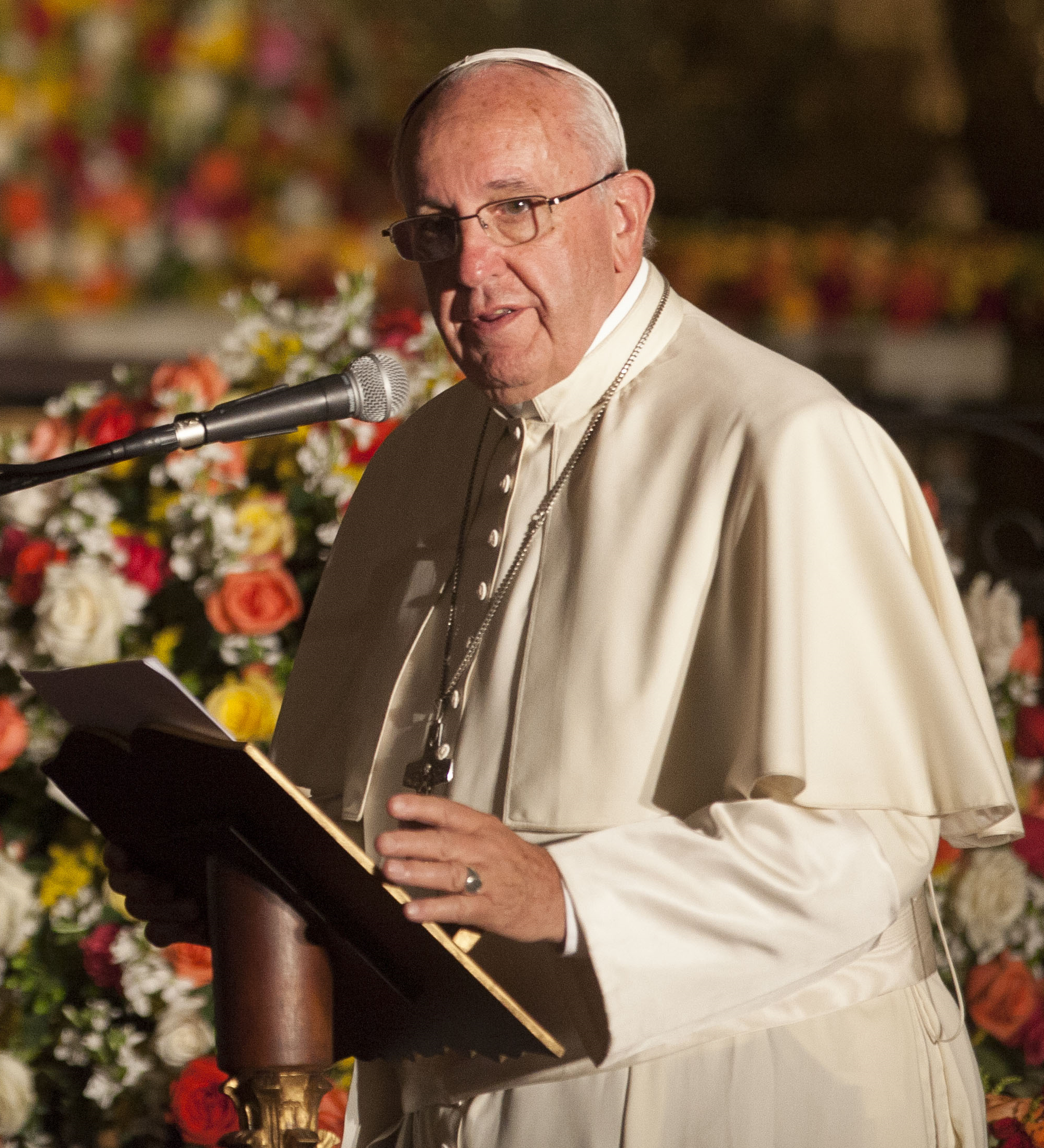
Pope Francis asked the members of Terço dos Homens to pray for two African nations in civil war: the Democratic Republic of the Congo and South Sudan.

== Modern issues ==
=== COVID-19 pandemic and estimation of the number of members ===
During the COVID-19 pandemic, the movement was severely restricted. Despite this, archbishop Gil Antônio Moreira estimated that more than two million Brazilian men engage in the movement. That corresponds to ~1% of the entire Brazilian population.

=== African countries in war ===
Pope Francis requested that members of Terço dos Homens pray for two African nations in civil war; the Democratic Republic of the Congo and South Sudan.

== Brazilian National Men's Rosary Day: 8 September ==
The federal deputy Eros Biondini (Partido Liberal-Minas Gerais) proposed the law 2676/21, which establishes 8 September as the National Men's Rosary Day. Federal deputy Evair Viera de Melo (Progressistas-Espírito Santo) redacted it. The date coincides with the Nativity of Our Lady. The law was approved by the Chamber of Deputies in June 2022. It still depends on being approved by the Senate and sanctioned by president Jair Bolsonaro.

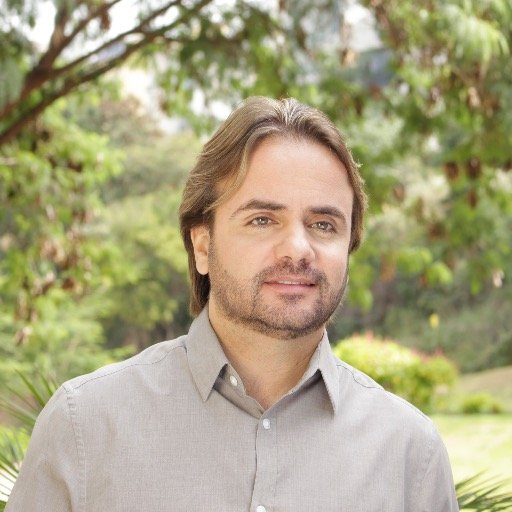
The federal deputy Eros Biondini (Partido Liberal-Minas Gerais), who proposed the law 2676/21, which establishes 8 September (Nativity of Our Lady) as the National Men's Rosary Day.

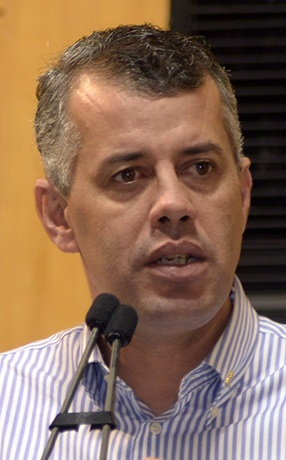
The federal deputy Evair Viera de Melo (Progressistas-Espírito Santo), who was the redactor of the proposed law 2676/21.

== In other countries ==
=== Hispanic countries ===
The Hispanic version of the movement, present in other South American countries (Argentina, Paraguai etc.), is called Rosario de Hombres Valientes.

=== USA ===
In the US, some male Brazilian migrants pray the Rosary under the translated name of Terço dos Homens: Men's Rosary.

== Bibliography ==
- Livro do Terço dos Homens: Manual Completo e Explicativo. Paulus, 2020. ISBN 6555620757
- Terço dos Homens. Associação do Senhor Jesus. 2022. ISBN 6599136230
- Terço dos Homens e a Grande Missão Masculina. Canção Nova, 2015. ISBN 857677481X
- Terço dos Homens: Uma razão em nossa fé, para uma fé com mais razão. Paulinas, 2016. ISBN 8535642250
- Rosário Bíblico do Terço dos Homens. Paulus, 2019. ISBN 8534948291
