= Rede São Paulo Saudável =

The Rede São Paulo Saudável (Healthy São Paulo Network, in Portuguese language) is a satellite-based digital TV corporate channel, developed by the Municipal Health Secretary of São Paulo, with the goal of bringing programs focused on health promotion and health education, which may be watched by the entire population seeking health care in its units in the city. The network consists of two complete TV studios, and a system for transmission of closed digital video in high definition via satellite, with about 1,400 points of reception in all health care units of the municipality of São Paulo, including its more than 700 public health care centers and posts, medical clinics, and 17 hospitals.

== Channel line-up ==
The TV network has currently three active channels.

The first channel (the Citizenship Channel) is devoted to the broadcasting of health education directly to the population in the waiting rooms of the units. Currently more than 400 short- and medium-length TV programs with this content are part of its grid.

The second channel (the Professional Education Channel) has the aim of providing continuing education and training programs to Health Secretary professionals, such as physicians, nurses, dentists, psychologists, social workers, etc., through distance education. The reception points for this channel are located in meeting rooms or classrooms inside the basic health units and hospitals.

The third channel (the "Administrative Channel") is interactive, and serves for meetings and for corporate communication with managers in general, as well as for the transmission of courses in real time. The interaction is accomplished by a chat interface, through the Internet connection of each unit, since the TV channel is unidirectional (broadcasting).

Each reception room for channels 1 and 2 has a 39" LCD TV and a digital satellite receiver connected to an externally placed satellite dish. Channel 3 is received directly in a PC microcomputer in the administrative offices.

== Distance Education ==
Several distance education courses for doctors, nurses and other health professionals are already in the air, and are freely available for the 54,000 employees of the Secretary. The courses consist or prerecorded or real time video transmissions according to a program grid, and of a public WWW site for off-class support using a Learning Management System (LMS).

The Centro de Formação e Desenvolvimento dos Trabalhadores da Saúde de São Paulo (CEFOR-SP) (Center for Buildup and Development of Healthcare Workers (CEFOR-SP) and the centers for research and education of several hospitals of the public health network of São Paulo, such as the Hospital do Servidor Publico Municipal de São Paulo (Hospital of the Public Servant of São Paulo) are among the institutions which create and provide certification of educational content. The Healthy São Paulo Network is managed by the Technical Department of Information Technology and the Educational Technology Group of CEFOR-SP.

== Technology ==
The Healthy São Paulo Network uses IPTV through multicasting via satellite, using the DVB standard. The default compression used is H.264 MPEG 4, with a total bandwidth of 20 Mbit/s for the 3 channels. The São Paulo company SpeedCast is responsible for the operation of the system and for providing the satellite space segment, with its satellite hub located in the city of Barueri. A virtual platform to support teaching and learning uses the Moodle learning management system (LMS), hosted in a virtual dedicated server operated by the state company PRODAM and developed by the Edumed Institute for Education in Medicine and Health.

=== Television studios ===
The network has two complete TV studios, a smaller one located at the central administrative center of the Secretary of Health, in downtown São Paulo, and another, with a full auditorium with 90 seats, located at CEFOR-SP, in the neighbourhood of Moema. The studios are equipped with robotic cameras, document cameras, smartboards, computers for presentation of slides, teleprompters, and control desks with video switchers, audio mixer and DVD recording capabilities
