= Our Lady of Sorrows Basilica (Caeté) =

Church in Caeté, Brazil

Basilica and Hermitage of Our Lady of Sorrows
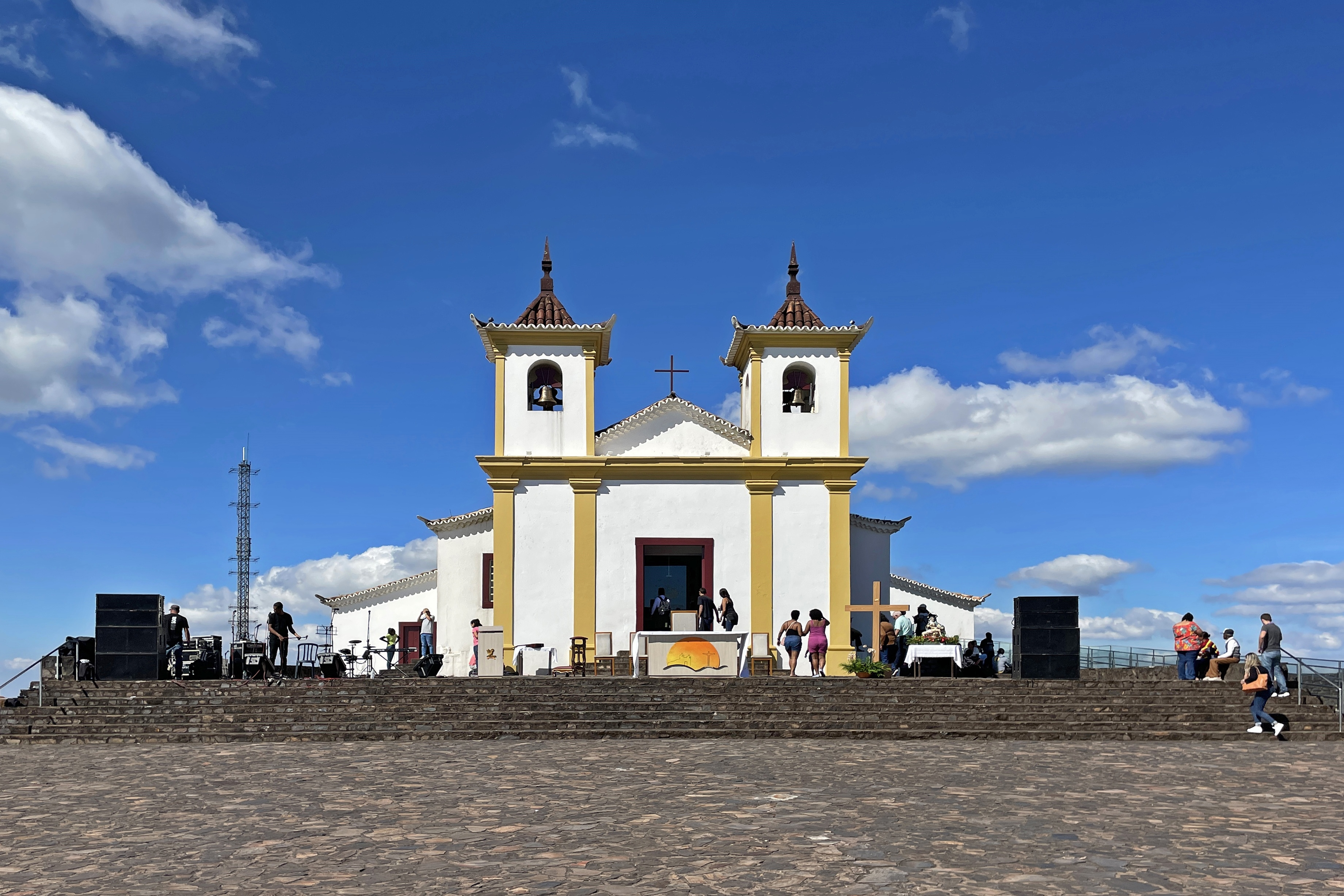
- Facade of the Basilica
- Basilica and Hermitage of Our Lady of Sorrows
- 19.8228°S 43.6756°W
- Location: Caeté, Minas Gerais, Brazil

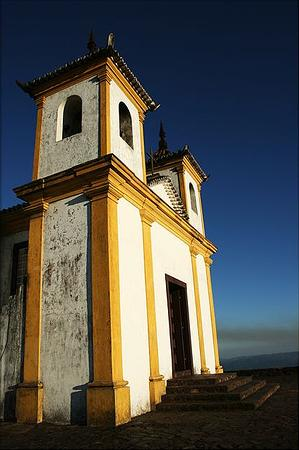
Side view of the façade.

The Basilica and Hermitage of Our Lady of Sorrows in Caeté, Minas Gerais state, Brazil, is a Baroque building dating to the 18th century.

The place is where the groups of Terço dos Homens movement of the state of Minas Gerais gather annually.
