= Vincenzo Mecozzi =

Italian painter

Vincenzo "Vicente" Mecozzi (1909 in Frascati, Italy - 1964 in São Paulo, Brazil) was a Brazilian decorator, professor and painter born in Italy.

Along with father Arnaldo Mecozzi, he was noted for his work in Brazil. They worked on buildings such as the Igreja do Imaculado Coração de Maria of São Paulo.
