= Arnaldo Mecozzi =

Italian decorator and painter

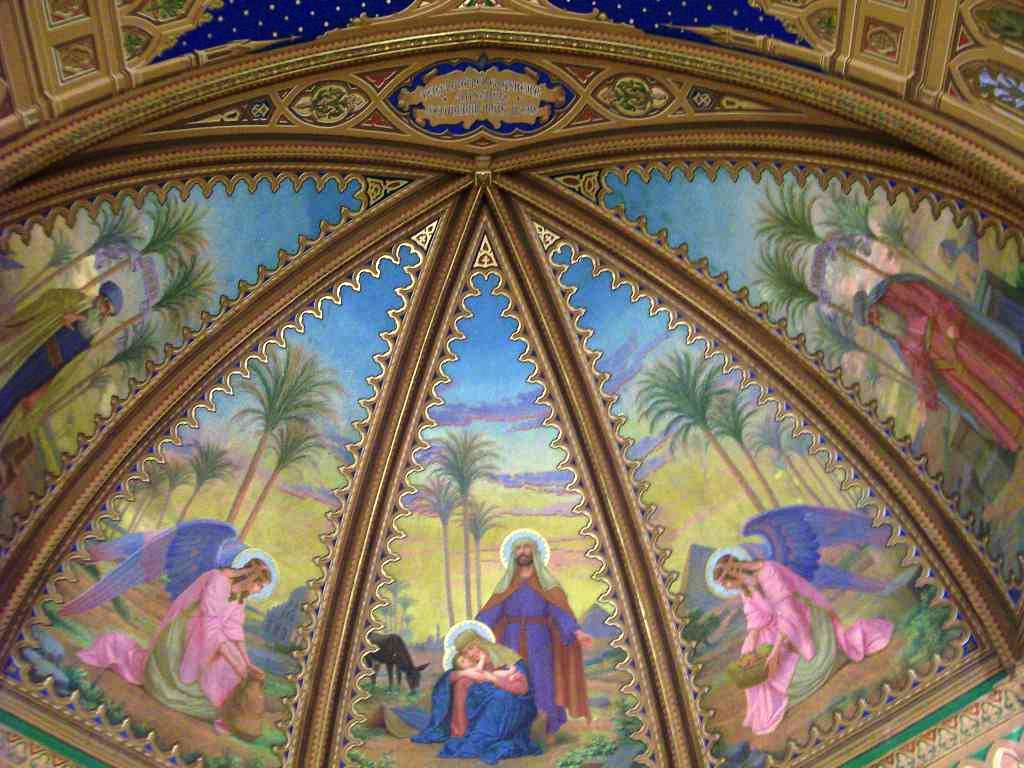
Internal decoration of the Nossa Senhora do Desterro Cathedral (Cathedral of Our Lady of Desterro) located in Jundiaí, São Paulo, done by Arnaldo Mecozzi.

Arnaldo Mecozzi (1876 in Frascati, Italy - Santos, Brazil 1932) was an Italian decorator and painter. Along with son Vincenzo Mecozzi, he was noted for his work in Brazil. They worked on buildings such as the Igreja do Imaculado Coração de Maria of São Paulo.
