= Igreja de São Cristóvão (São Paulo) =

São Cristóvão
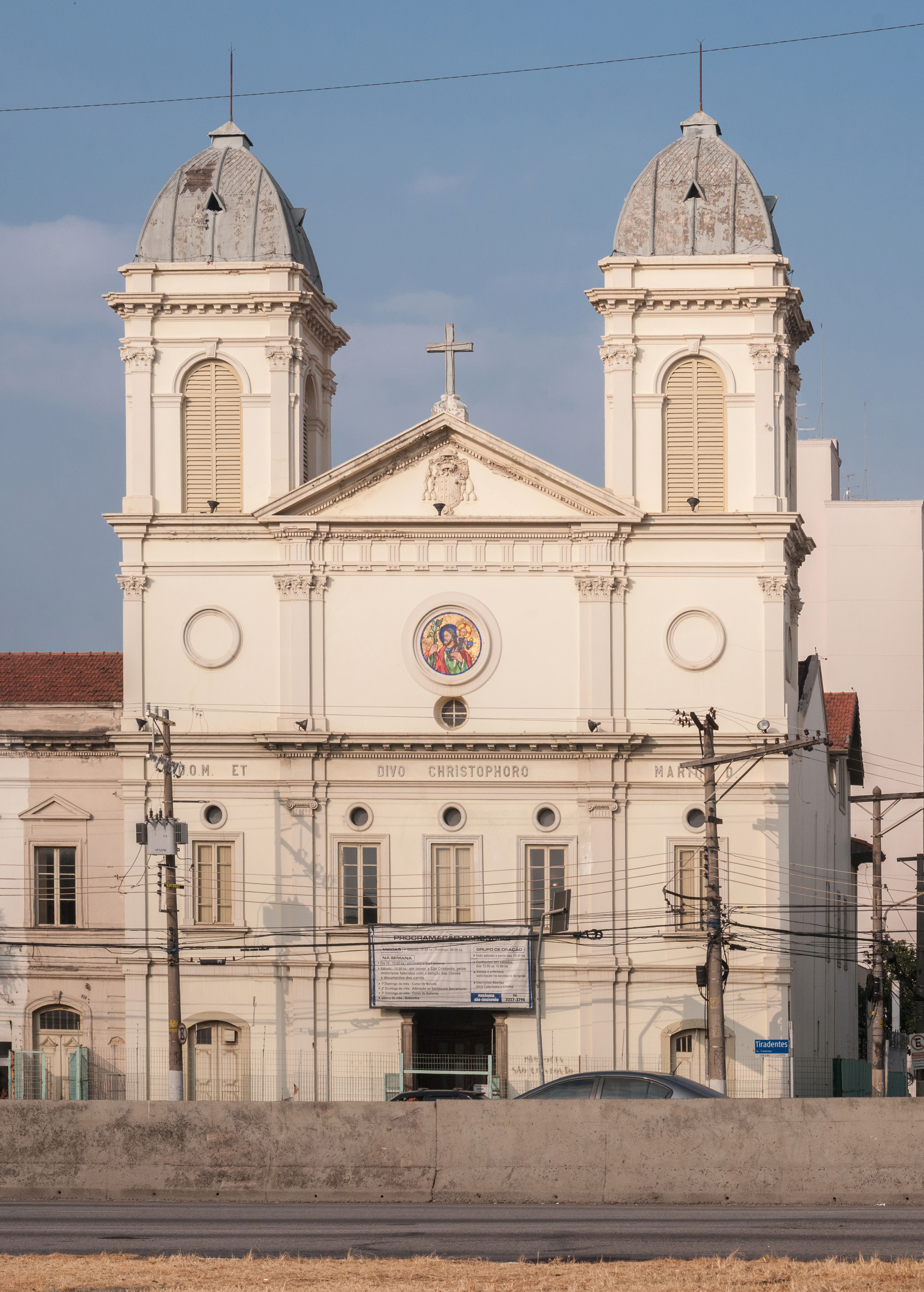
- São Cristóvão
- 23°32′6″S 46°37′59″W
- Location: Avenida Tiradentes, 84; São Paulo
- Country: Brazil
- Denomination: Roman Catholic

Igreja de São Cristóvão is a church located in São Paulo, Brazil on the Avenida Tiradentes. Originally part of a larger religious complex, the church dates back to 1853. It is situated in the Luz district.

The church underwent restoration in the late 20th century after its wall collapsed in 1982. It was officially restored and reopened in 2001. The building, once part of a larger seminary complex, is now recognized as a protected cultural monument by the State of São Paulo.
