= Paróquia São Paulo Apóstolo =

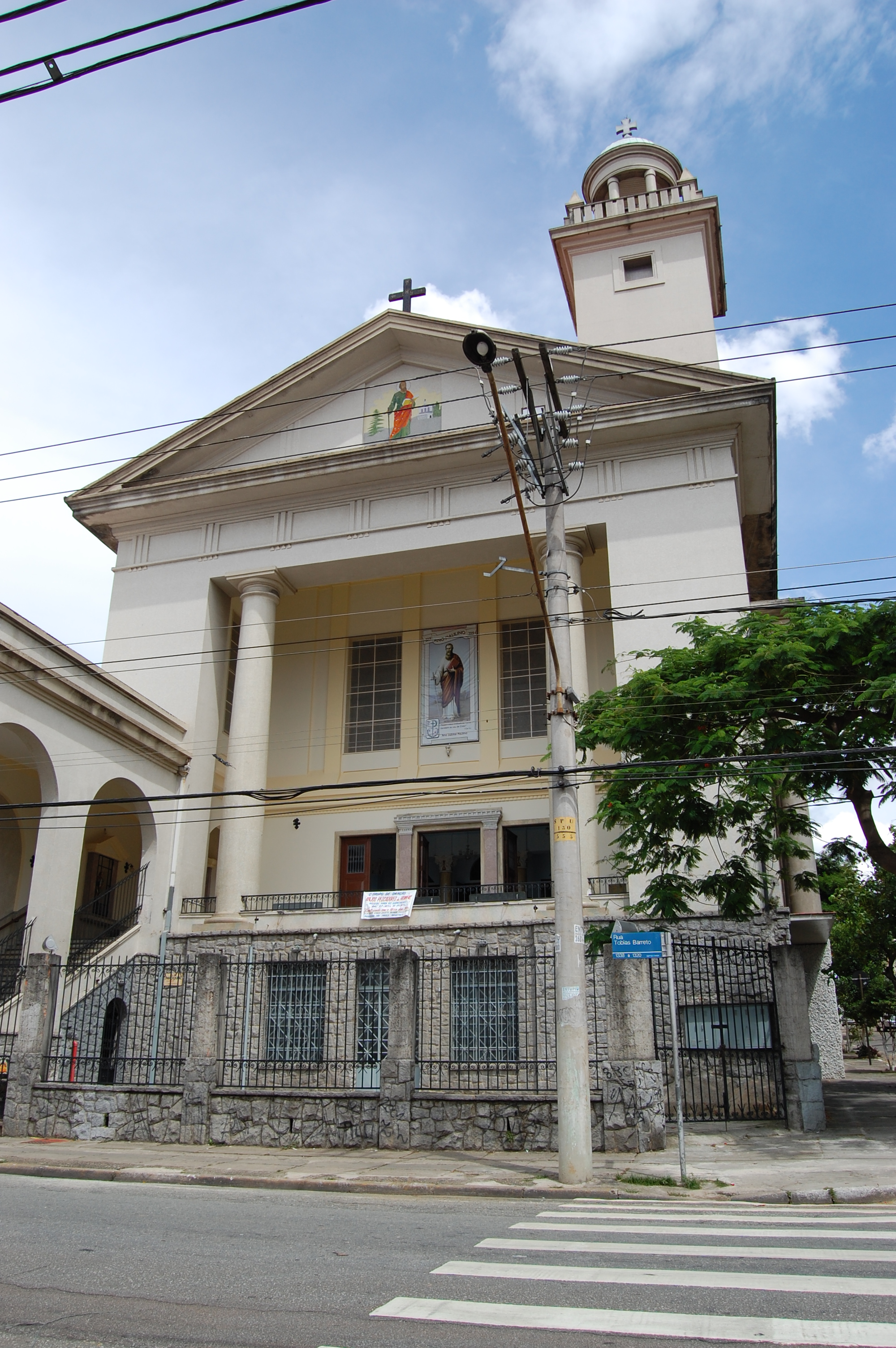
- Paróquia São Paulo Apóstolo
- 23°32′51″S 46°35′9″W
- Location: Rua Tobias Barreto, 1320; São Paulo
- Country: Brazil
- Denomination: Roman Catholic

Paróquia São Paulo Apóstolo is a church located in São Paulo, Brazil. It was established on 8 December 1939.
