= PRODAM =

The Information and Communication Technology Company of the Municipality of Sao Paulo (Portuguese: Empresa de Tecnologia da Informação e Comunicação do Município de São Paulo, abbreviated as PRODAM-SP) is a state company owned by the municipal government of São Paulo, Brazil. As the city's technological partner, it is in charge of all computer infrastructure and data processing tasks in the city and acts as a strategic integrator of information and communication technology solutions. It was established on the basis of Law 7619 passed June 23, 1971.
