= Paróquia Santa Rita de Cássia =

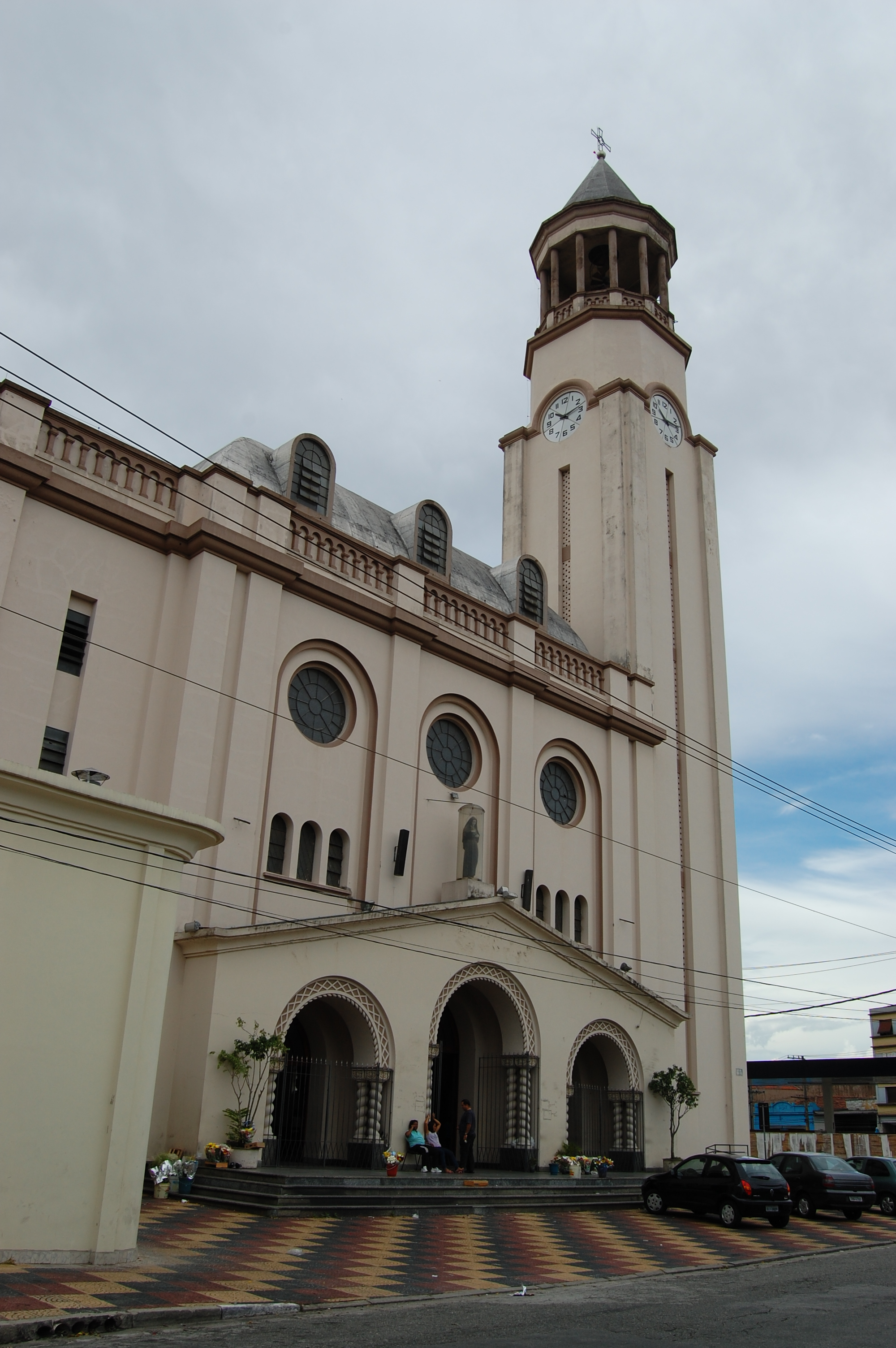
- Paróquia Santa Rita de Cássia
- 23°36′23″S 46°38′27″W
- Location: Praça Santa Rita de Cássia, 133; São Paulo
- Country: Brazil
- Denomination: Roman Catholic

Paróquia Santa Rita de Cássia is a church located in São Paulo, Brazil. It was established on 25 May 1937.
