= Paróquia Nossa Senhora Aparecida dos Ferroviários =

- Paróquia Nossa Senhora Aparecida dos Ferroviários
- 23°32′54″S 46°36′33″W
- Location: Rua Almirante Brasil, 125; São Paulo
- Country: Brazil
- Denomination: Roman Catholic

Paróquia Nossa Senhora Aparecida dos Ferroviários is a church located in São Paulo, Brazil.
