= Santo Antônio do Rio Abaixo Main Church =

Church building in Santo Antônio do Rio Abaixo, Brazil

The Santo Antônio do Rio Abaixo Main Church is a parish of Santo Antônio do Rio Abaixo, in Minas Gerais, in the square Alcino Quintão, No. 34. It is located in the Roman Catholic Diocese of Guanhães

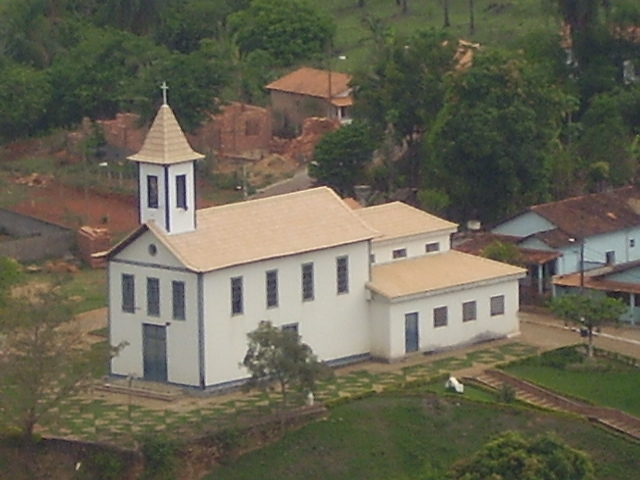
Santo Antônio do Rio Abaixo Main Church

Built as a chapel in the 18th century, it was replaced by a larger building and raised the parish church in the 19th century. Its facade is simple, according to a neoclassical style reminiscent of colonial baroque. It has a tower on top and an altar in Rococo style. It was devoted to St. Anthony, who at the time of its construction was the patron saint of pilgrims and pioneers.

== History ==
In the year 1788 the pioneer José Ferreira Santiago went to the king asking permission to raise a chapel to St. Anthony atop a small hill, near a village. In 1874, Firmino Alves de Andrade knocked the chapel to be replaced by a larger church. As the church was on the hill and the Santo Antônio river at the bottom, the city became a municipality in 1963, was named Santo Antônio do Rio Abaixo.

Beside the church was built a grand staircase access. Also built was a square below the church called Nova República Square in the center of the main square called Alcino Quintão Square. The church now belongs to the Diocese of Guanhães, whose representatives are the Bishop Emanuel Messias de Oliveira and Father Adão Soares de Souza.
