= Basílica José de Anchieta =

Church in the state of São Paulo in Brazil

Coordinates: 23.54817°S 46.63272°W

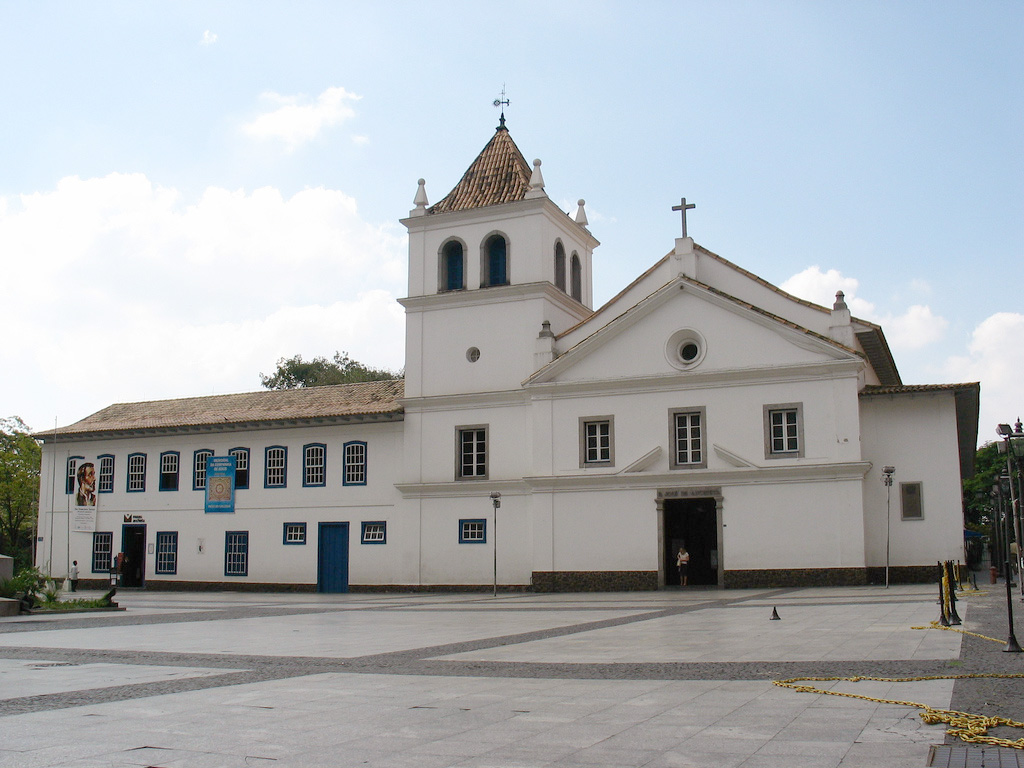

Basílica José de Anchieta is a church located in São Paulo, Brazil. The current building was built between 1953 and 1979 after the demolition of the old building which sat here.

== See also ==
- List of Jesuit sites
