= Evair de Melo =

Brazilian politician

- De Melo in the Chamber of Deputies

Senator-elect for Espírito Santo
- Assuming office 1 February 2027

Member of the Chamber of Deputies
- Incumbent
- Assumed office 1 February 2015
- Constituency: Espírito Santo

Personal details
- Born: Evair Vieira de Melo; 2 April 1972 (age 54) Conceição do Castelo, Espírito Santo, Brazil
- Party: Republicans (2026–present)
- Other political affiliations: PSDB (2003–2009); PV (2009–2018); PP (2018–2026)
- Website: evairdemelo.com.br

Evair Vieira de Melo (born April 2, 1972, Conceição do Castelo, Espírito Santo) is a Brazilian agricultural technician and federal deputy from the state of Espírito Santo.

He is a member of the Republican party (REP).

De Melo is a member of the Agricultural Committee of the Chamber of Deputies. He was the only deputy from Espírito Santo to participate at the commission for the impeachment of Dilma Rousseff.

He was reelected in 2018 with 48,412 votes and reelected in 2022 with 75,034 (3.60%) of the valid votes.

He is an ally of Conservative president Jair Bolsonaro.
