= Paróquia Santa Teresinha (São Paulo) =

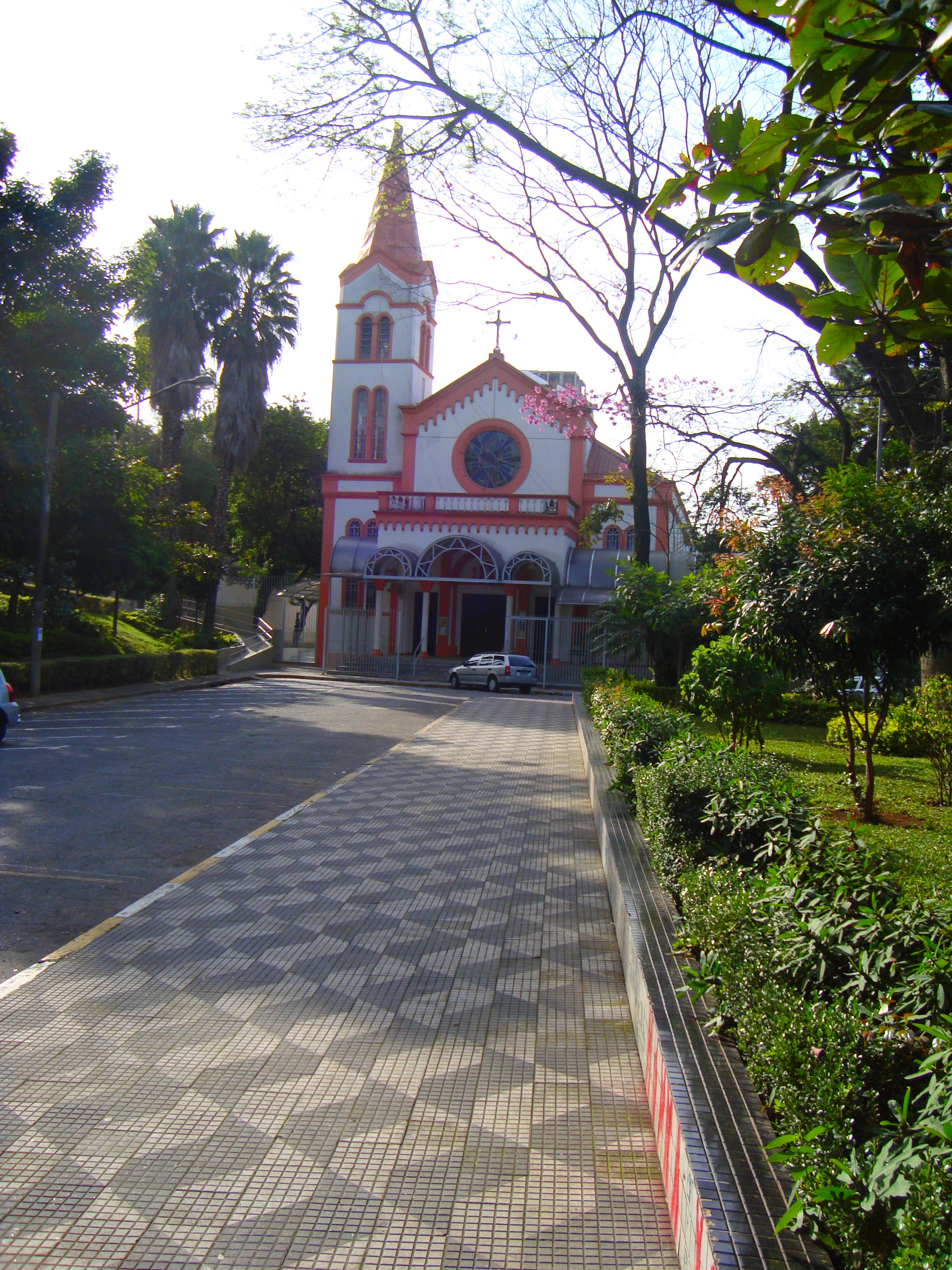
- Paróquia Santa Teresinha
- 23°29′27″S 46°38′2″W
- Location: Praça Domingos Correia da Cruz, 140; São Paulo
- Country: Brazil
- Denomination: Roman Catholic

Paróquia Santa Teresinha is a church located in São Paulo, Brazil. It was built in 1945.
