= Primeira Igreja Batista em Vila Silvia =

- Primeira Igreja Batista em Vila Silvia
- 23°29′50″S 46°29′55″W
- Location: Rua Erval Seco, 100; São Paulo
- Country: Brazil
- Denomination: Roman Catholic

Primeira Igreja Batista em Vila Silvia is a church located in São Paulo, Brazil.
