= Igreja do Imaculado Coração de Maria (São Paulo) =

Imaculado Coração de Maria (ICM)
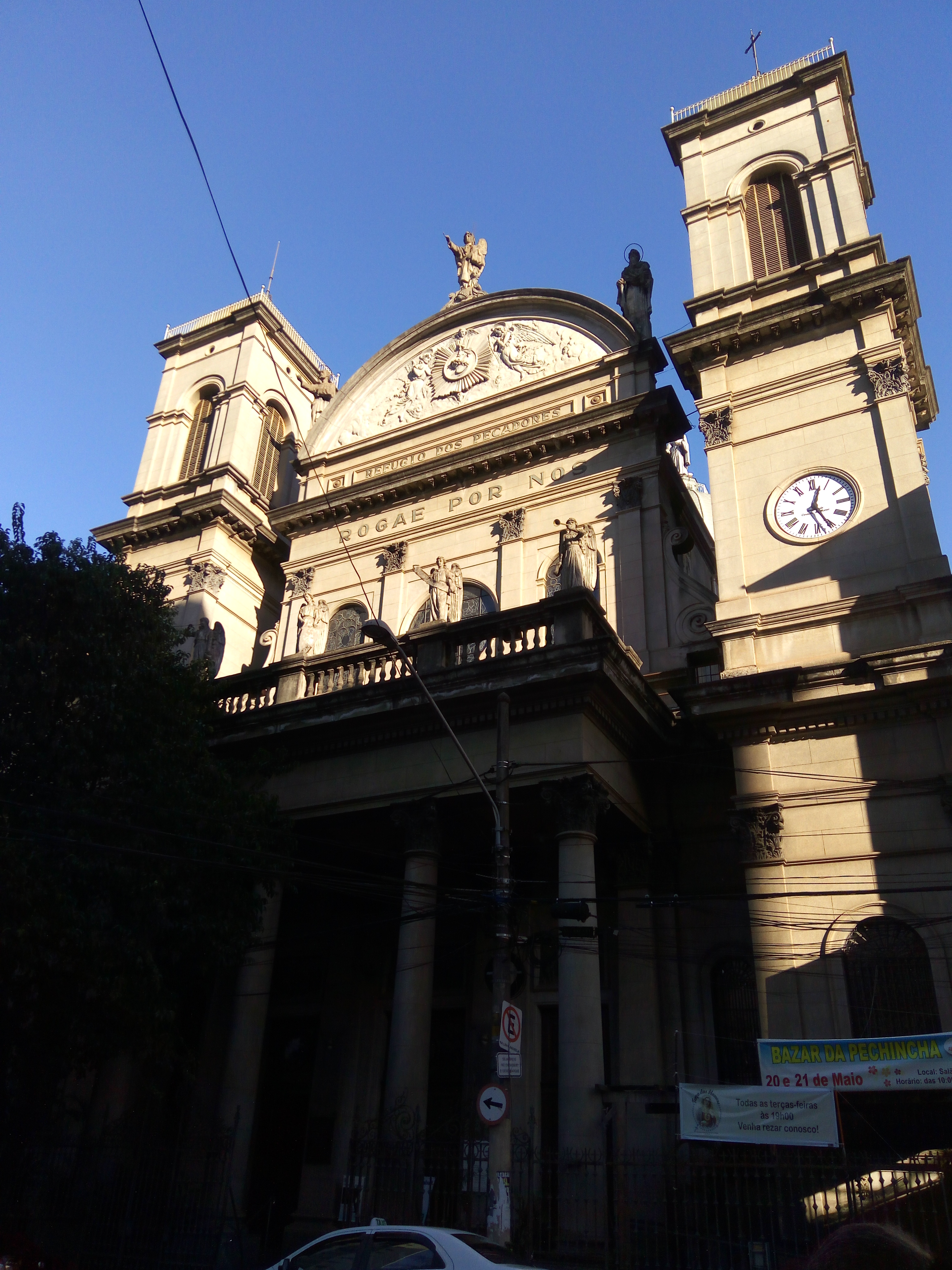
- Imaculado Coração de Maria (ICM)
- 23°32′30″S 46°39′18″W
- Location: Avenida Getulio Vargas Curitiba PR
- Country: Brazil
- Denomination: Roman Catholic

Igreja do Imaculado Coração de Maria (English: Church of the Immaculate Heart of Mary) (ICM) is a Catholic church located in São Paulo, Brazil. It is located in the district of Santa Cecilia, and was built between 1897 and 1899, replacing the Church Yard College demolished in 1896.

On March 13, 1896, it had suffered a landslide due to heavy rain, being entirely demolished two days later. On the walls, ceilings and other architectural elements of the church, there are murals and decorative art signed by Italian artists Arnaldo Mecozzi and Vincenzo Mecozzi.
