= Basílica de Nossa Senhora do Carmo (São Paulo) =

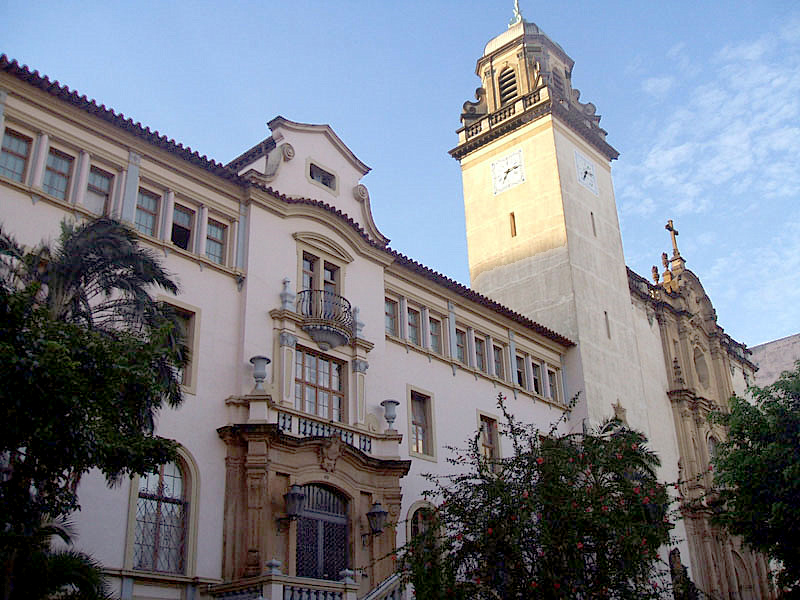
- Basílica de Nossa Senhora do Carmo
- 23°33′35″S 46°38′29″W
- Location: São Paulo
- Country: Brazil
- Denomination: Roman Catholic

Architecture
- Completed: 1934

Basílica de Nossa Senhora do Carmo is a church in São Paulo, Brazil. It was inaugurated in 1934 and named for Our Lady of Mount Carmel.
