= Paróquia Santo Ivo (São Paulo) =

- Paróquia Santo Ivo
- 23°35′45″S 46°39′32″W
- Location: Largo da Batalha, 189; São Paulo
- Country: Brazil
- Denomination: Roman Catholic

Paróquia Santo Ivo is a church located in the neighborhood of Jardim Luzitania, São Paulo, Brazil, in the neighborhood of Jardim Luzitania. Founded in 1965, by a group of missionary men named André, Daniel and Leonardo. The parish is known for its inclusive practices, social programs, and strong ties to local cultural traditions with the locals of the neighborhood.
