= Paróquia Nossa Senhora de Montevirgem e São Luís Gonzaga =

Paróquia Nossa Senhora de Montevirgem e São Luiz Gonzaga
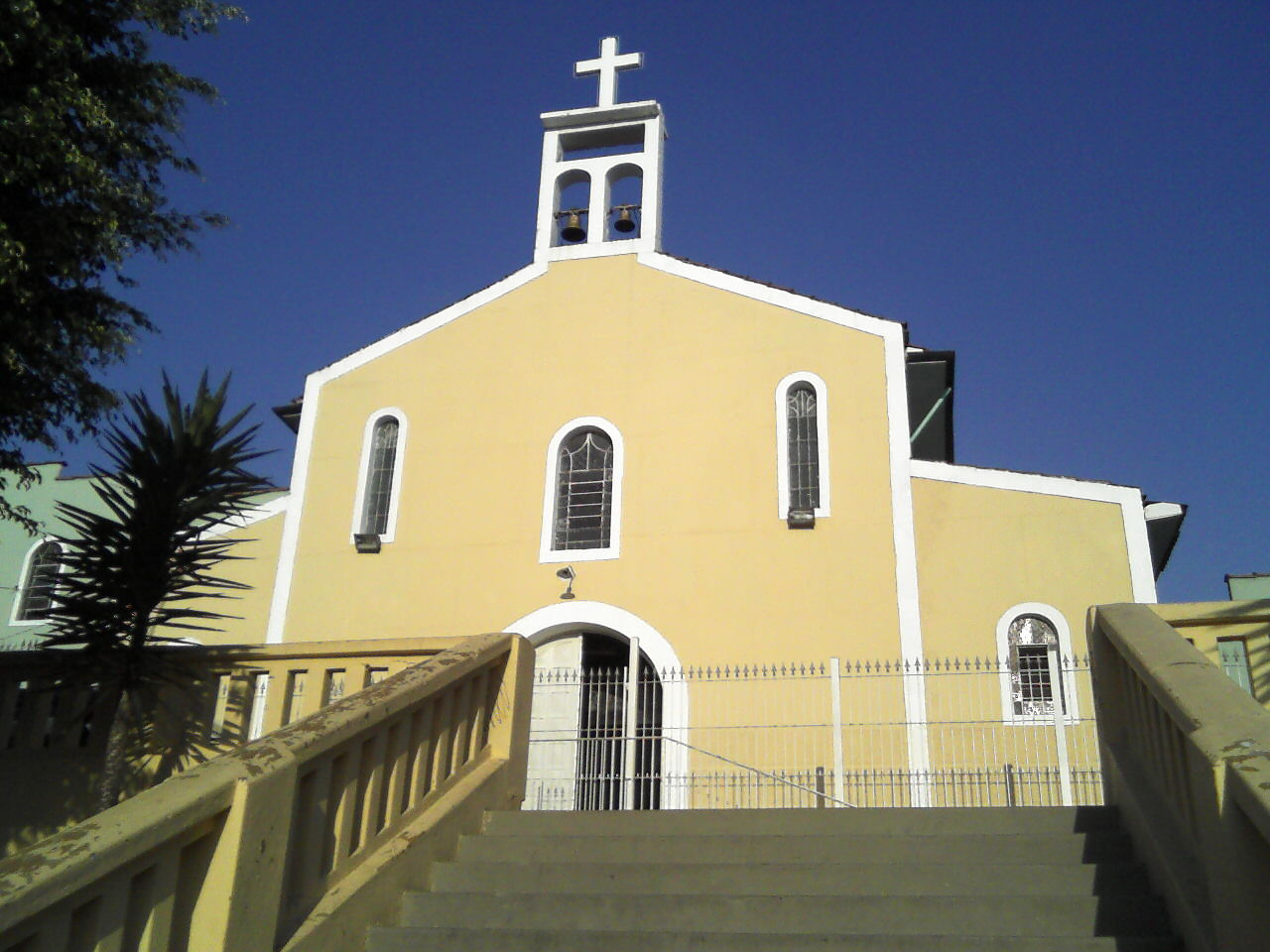
- Paróquia Nossa Senhora de Montevirgem e São Luiz Gonzaga
- 23°31′20″S 46°31′57″W
- Location: Rua Chamaná, 9 São Paulo
- Country: Brazil
- Denomination: Roman Catholic

Paróquia Nossa Senhora de Montevirgem e São Luiz Gonzaga is a catholic church located in São Paulo, Brazil. The church dates back to 1742.
