= Centro de Formação e Desenvolvimento dos Trabalhadores da Saúde de São Paulo =

The Centro de Formação e Desenvolvimento dos Trabalhadores da Saúde de São Paulo (Center for Education and Development of Health Care Workers of São Paulo, in Portuguese language - abbreviated CEFOR-SP) is a division of the Municipal Secretary of Health of São Paulo, created on March 30, 1990, by the Municipal Law No. 28,625.

The Center aims to train and to develop human resources for the Secretary's workforce, as well as the production and dissemination of educational materials to support these actions. Another objective is to complete and to supplement the primary and secondary education of its employees. Thus it is expected that the personal and professional development of the more than 57,000 public health care workers will benefit directly and indirectly the continuing improvement of quality of care provided to the citizens of São Paulo.

== Technical School of the Unified Health System of São Paulo ==
The Escola Técnica do SUS de São Paulo (ETSUS-SP) was created by Municipal Decree No. 42,120 of 19 June 2002. It is affiliated and coordinated by CEFOR-SP, and has eight regional branches (South, Southeast I and II, East I and II, North I and II, and Center-West)

The school offers secondary-level technical vocational courses in allied health care with minimum duration of 1,200 hours, and provides certification which is valid for the entire national territory:

- Pharmaceutical care
- Environmental health
- Management of Health Care Units
- Orthopedics Technician
- Pharmacy Technician
- Nursing Technician
- Dental hygienist
- Community health agent

== Distance education ==
CEFOR-SP in charge of educational coordination of the Rede São Paulo Saudável (Healthy São Paulo Network) professional education digital TV channel and distance education initiatives of the Secretary of Health.
