= Paróquia Nossa Senhora Achiropita =

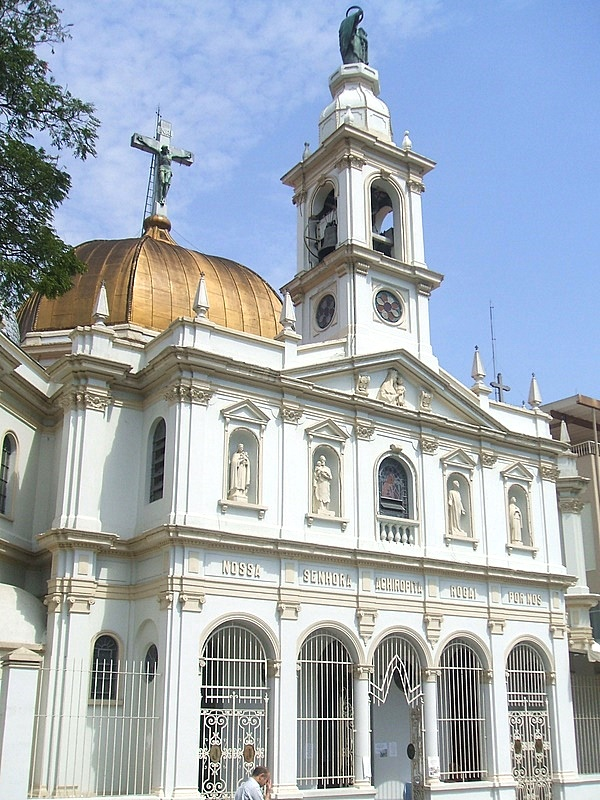
- Paróquia Nossa Senhora Achiropita
- 23°33′27″S 46°38′48″W
- Location: Rua Treze de Maio, 478; São Paulo
- Country: Brazil
- Denomination: Roman Catholic

The Parish of Our Lady of Acheropita (Portuguese: Paróquia Nossa Senhora Achiropita) is a church located in São Paulo, Brazil, in the Archdiocese of São Paulo. It was established on 4 March 1926 by Italian immigrants.

It is the only church in Brazil dedicated to Our Lady of Acheropita. She is remembered annually on August 15 for a month, with the Nossa Senhora Anchiropita celebration, an event part of the official calendar of São Paulo.

== See also ==
- Parishes in the Archdiocese of São Paulo
- Festa de Nossa Senhora Achiropita, culture of the Bixiga neighbourhood
