= Paróquia Nossa Senhora de Lourdes (São Paulo) =

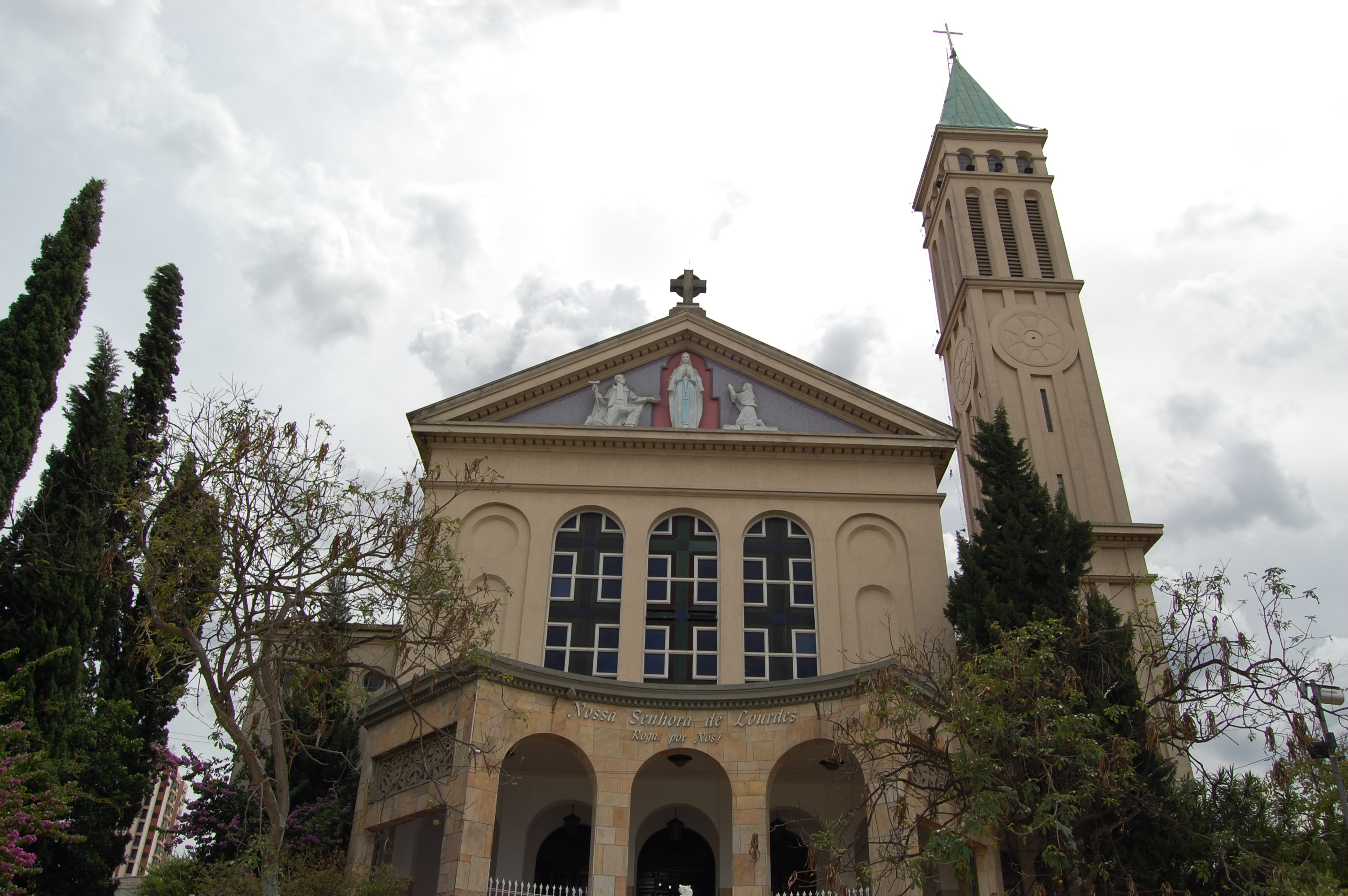
- Paróquia Nossa Senhora de Lourdes
- 23°37′6″S 46°39′1″W
- Location: Alameda dos Piratinins, 679; São Paulo
- Country: Brazil
- Denomination: Roman Catholic

Paróquia Nossa Senhora de Lourdes is a church located in São Paulo, Brazil. The church was created on 8 December 1939.
