= Paróquia Nossa Senhora do Bom Conselho =

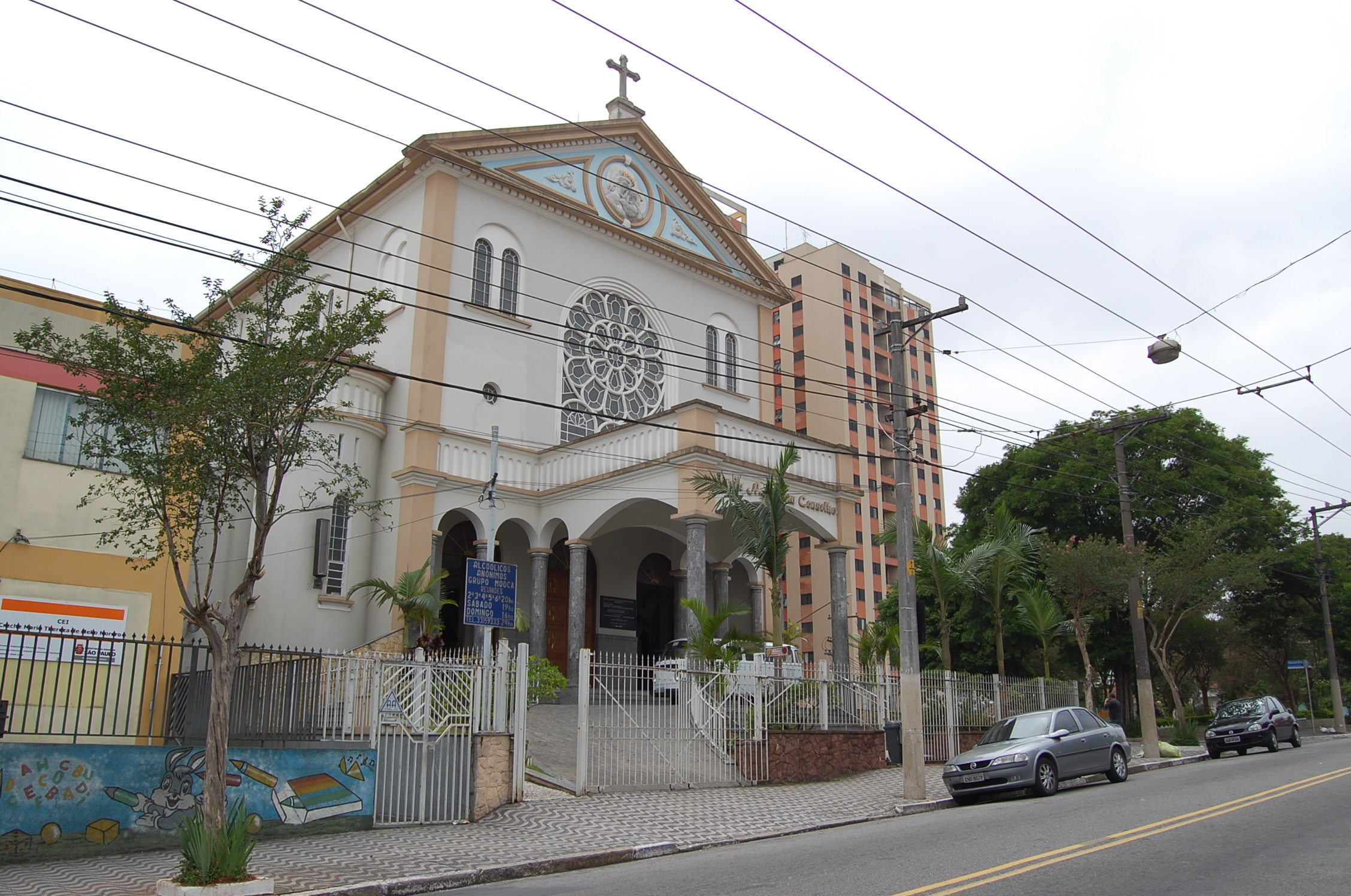

- Location within Brazil
- 23.559297°S 46.587613°W
- Location: Rua Nossa Senhora do Bom Conselho, 87/99, São Paulo
- Country: Brazil
- Denomination: Roman Catholic

Administration
- Diocese: Campo Limpo

Clergy
- Priest: Sylvestre San-Gala Mulangwa

Paróquia Nossa Senhora do Bom Conselho is a parish located in the Mooca district of São Paulo, Brazil, in the Roman Catholic Diocese of Campo Limpo. The parish is in the Belém sector of the Archdiocese of São Paulo. It was established on 24 March 1940. Construction of the church that is now the seat of the parish began in 1973.

== Origins ==
The church has its origins in the 1960s with the São Luiz Gonzaga college and seminary on the Avenida Paulista in Campo Limpo. The fathers owned a farm in Campo Limpo, growing food for their own use. The college chapel had an image of Nossa Senhora do Bom Conselho (Our Lady of Good Counsel) that had come from Italy. A copy of the image was installed in a building on the farm that was used as a garage, but also as a house of prayer and Sunday worship. The area was developed, and the farm was sold to make way for housing, but a 1,000 square metres (11,000 sq ft) site was set aside for church purposes. At first the plan was to build an extension to the college, but this was replaced by a daycare that currently serves 250 children, run by volunteers from the São Luiz Gonzaga college.

== Church and parish ==
The cornerstone for the church was laid on 1 December 1973, and the church was built mainly using donations raised from people in richer neighborhoods. In November 1983 the Marist fathers Michael Francis Mahoney from New Zealand and Eugen Lasmann from Germany came to the community, and in December 1986 raised the church to become the seat of the parish. In February 1998 the parish merged with the community of Santa Maria Goretti, formerly part of the parish of Nossa Senhora do Carmo. Father Sylvestre, who had been the Parish Administrator for seven years, assumed the duties of pastor the parish on 4 July 2010.

== Today ==
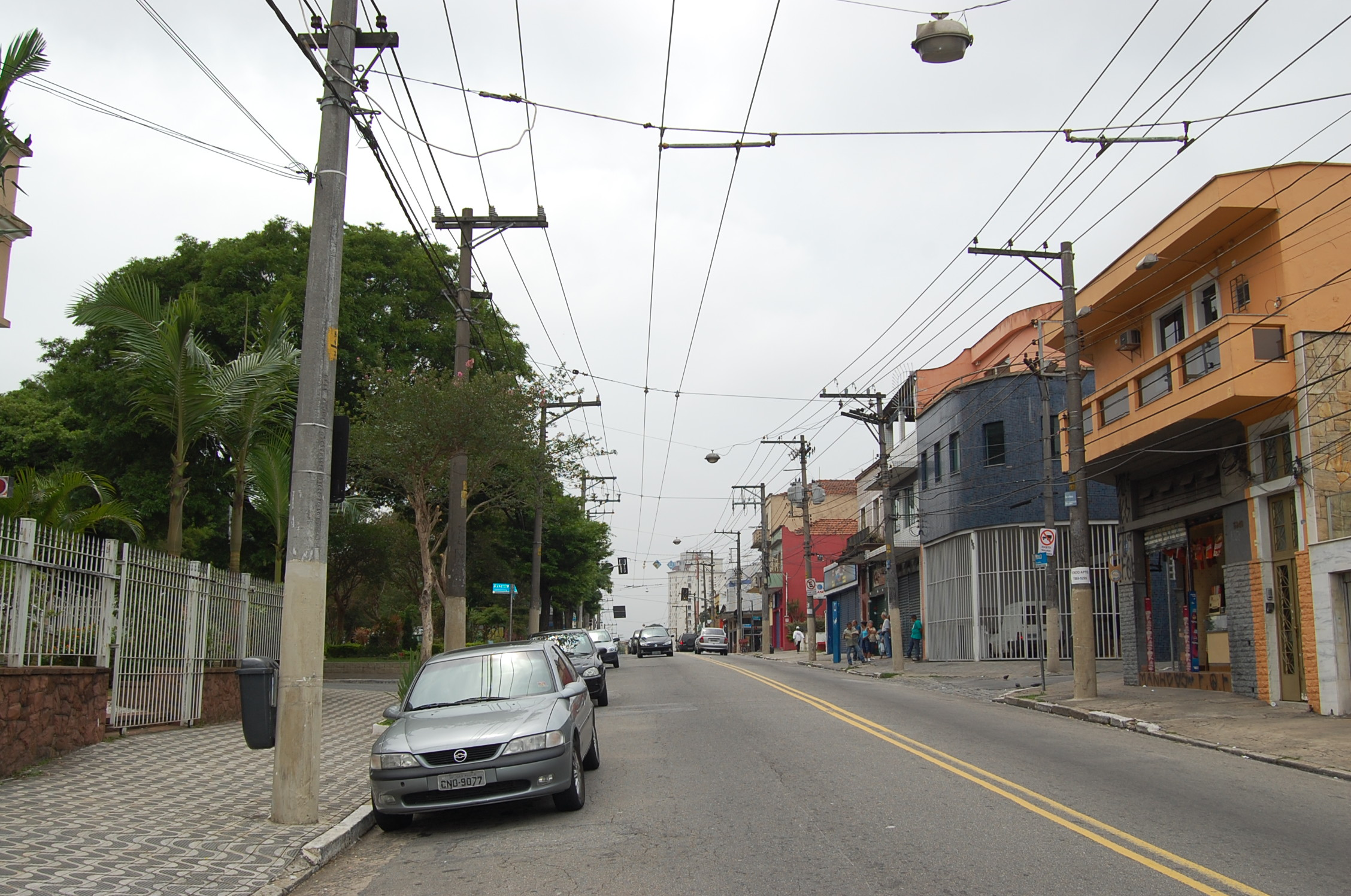
Rua da Mooca in front of the church

Today about 1,500 people attend weekend Mass, and about 200 parishioners undertake community service.
