= Capela de Santa Cruz (São Paulo) =

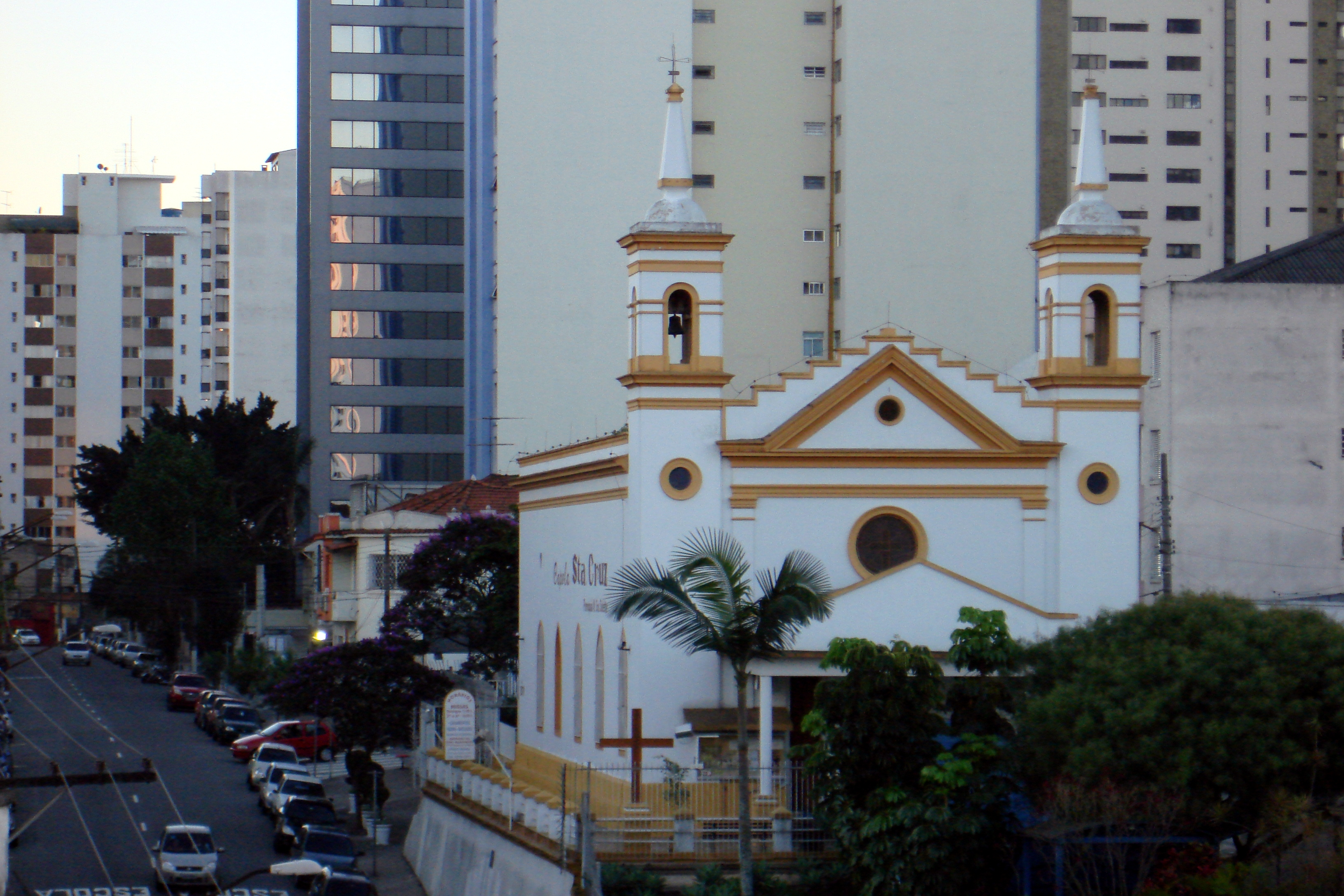
- Capela de Santa Cruz
- 23°29′48″S 46°37′33″W
- Location: Rua Voluntários da Pátria, 2678; São Paulo
- Country: Brazil
- Denomination: Roman Catholic

Architecture
- Completed: 1895

Capela de Santa Cruz is a Roman Catholic church located in São Paulo, Brazil. It was completed in 1895.
