= Paróquia São José do Belém =

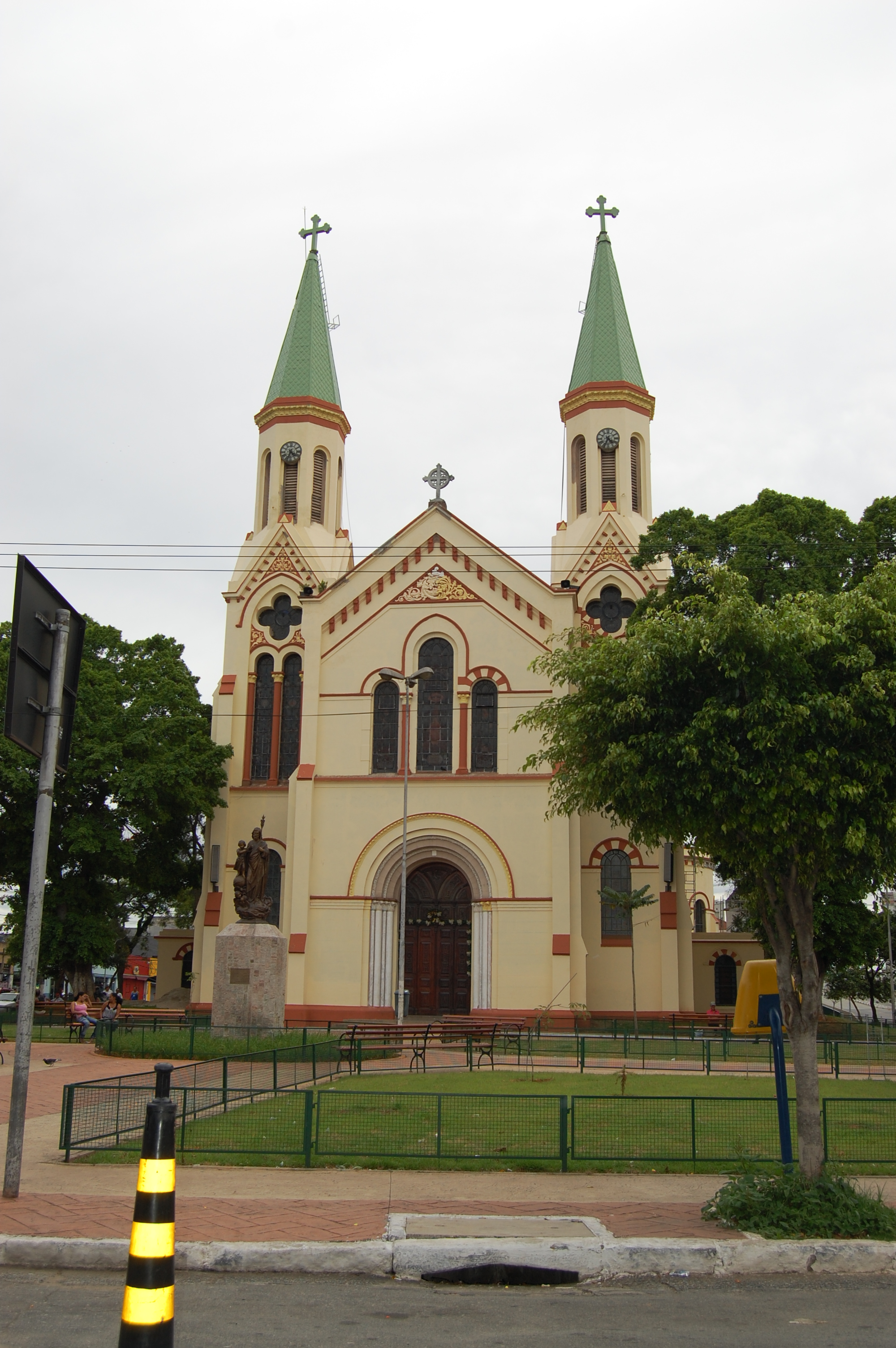
- Paróquia São José do Belém
- 23°32′27″S 46°35′39″W
- Location: Largo São José do Belém, São Paulo
- Country: Brazil
- Denomination: Roman Catholic

Paróquia São José do Belém is a church located in São Paulo, Brazil. It was established on 14 July 1897.
