= Caeté =

- Municipality
- Municipality of Caeté
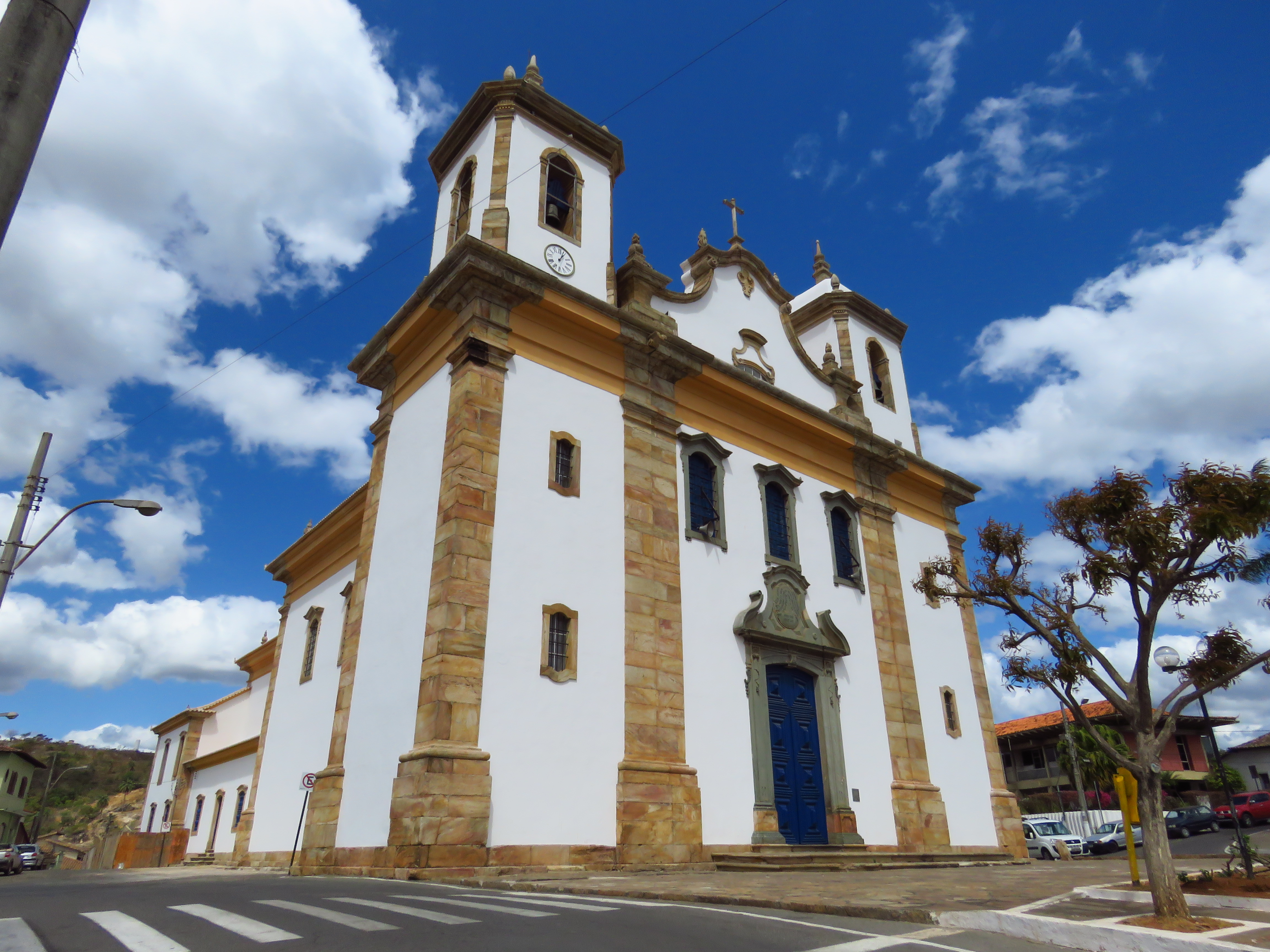
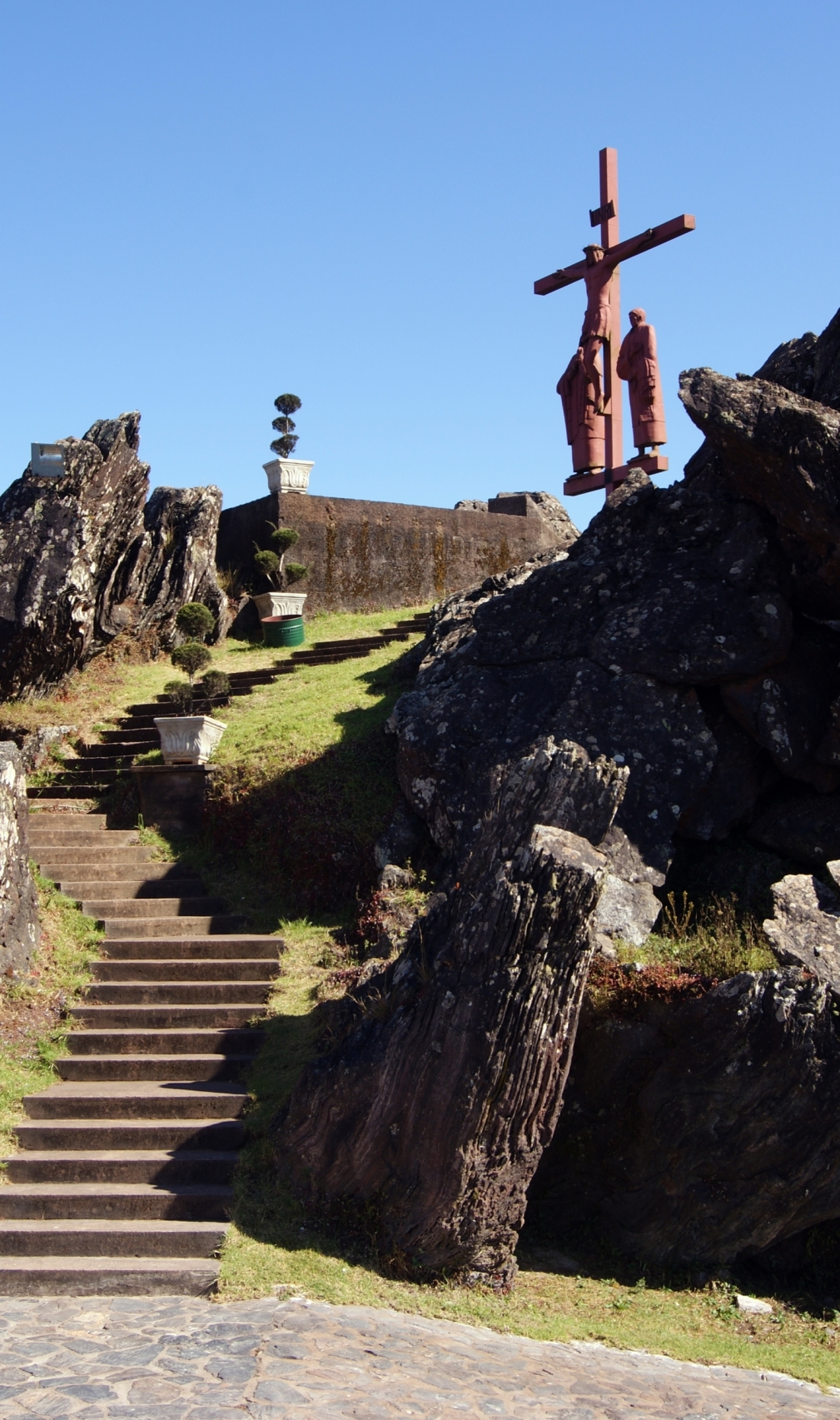
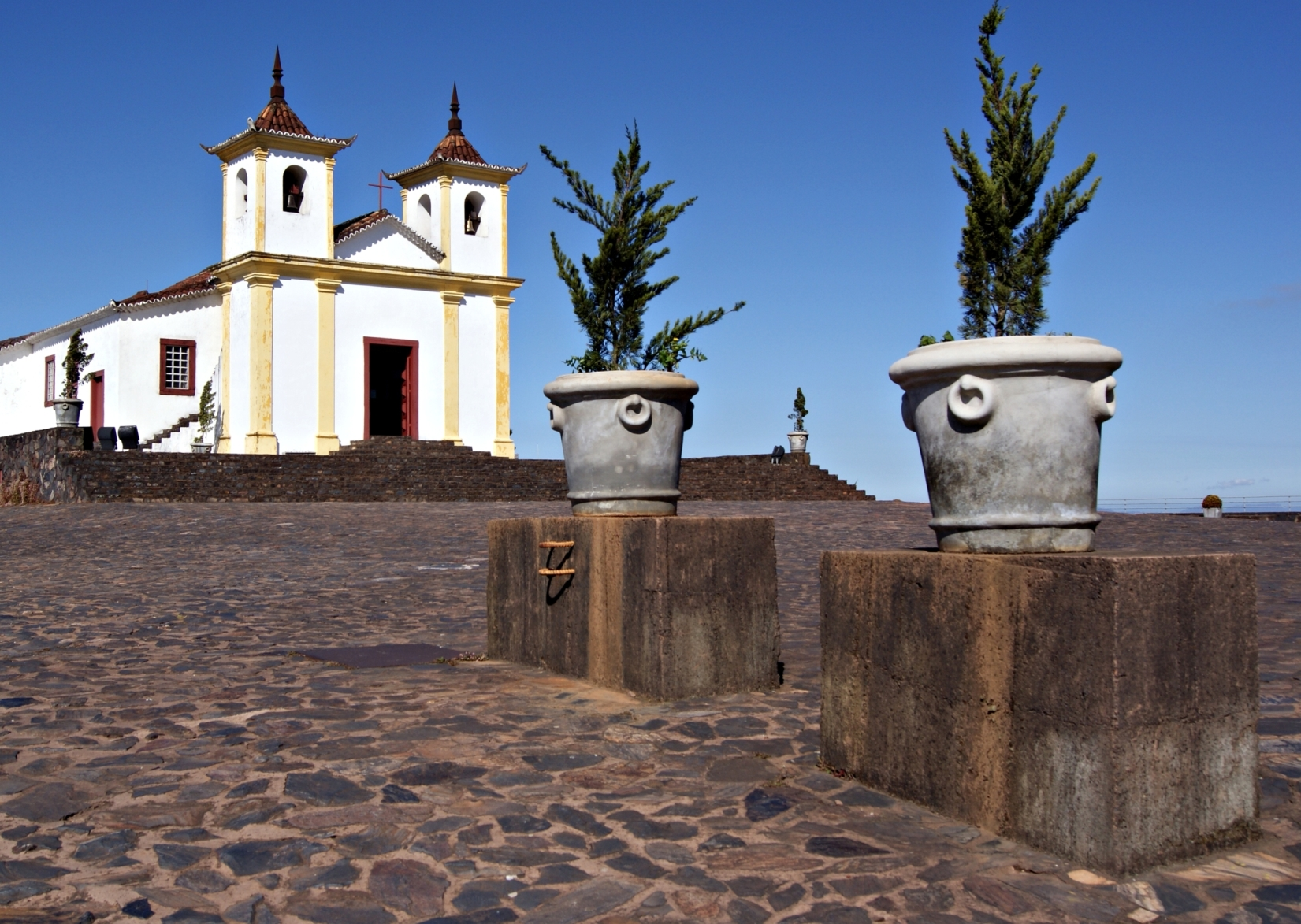
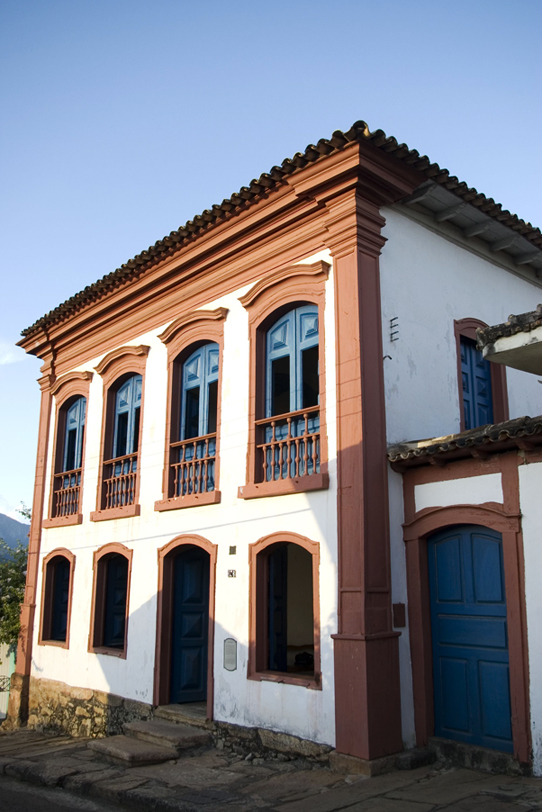
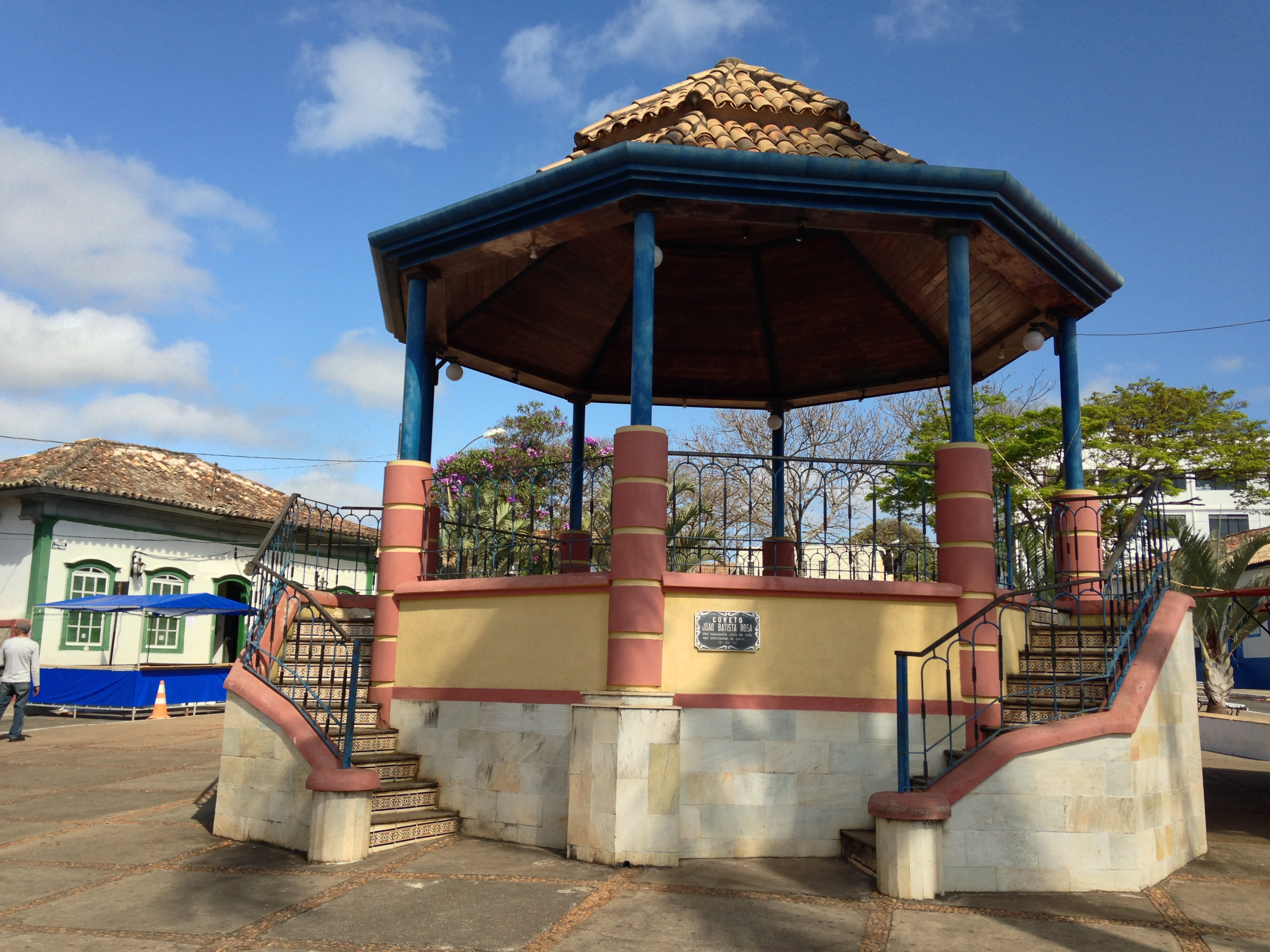
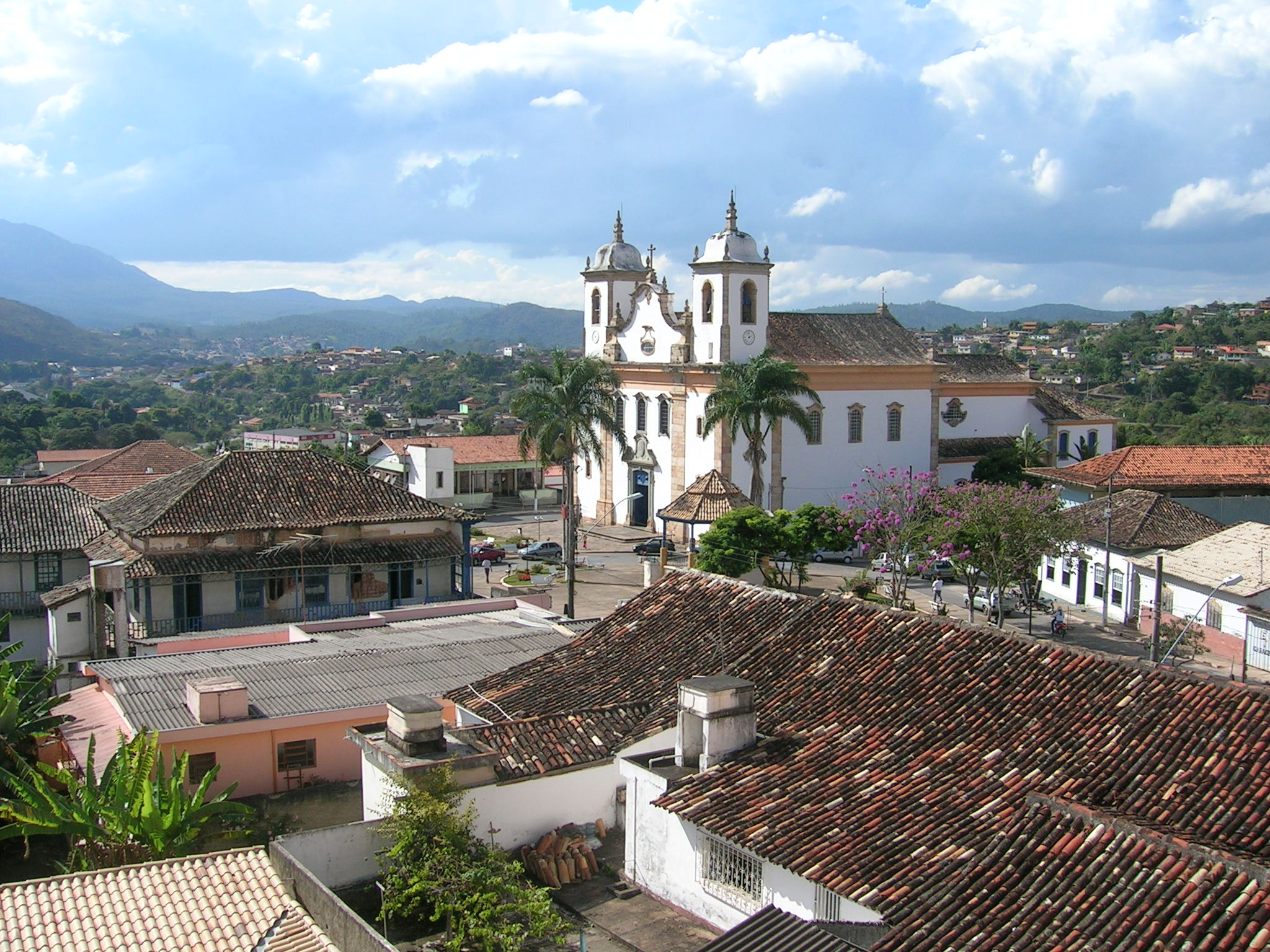

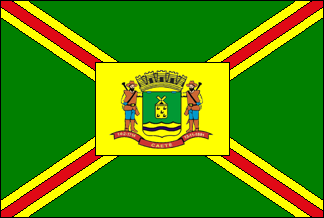
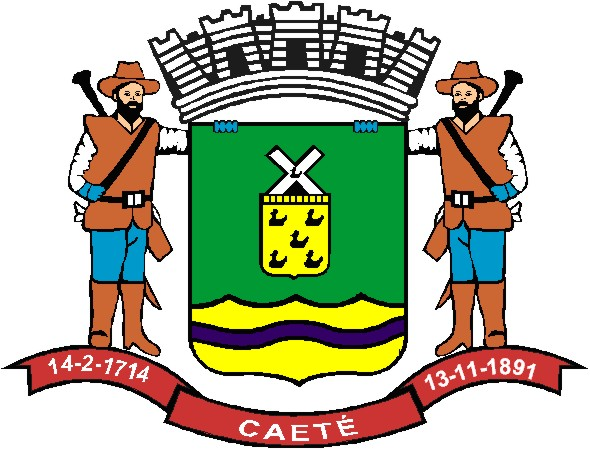
- Flag Coat of arms

- Location in Brazil
- Coordinates: 19°52′48″S 43°40′12″W
- Country: Brazil
- Region: Southeast
- State: Minas Gerais
- Mesoregion: Metropolitan of Belo Horizonte
- Microregion: Belo Horizonte
- Settled: 17th century
- Incorporated: February 12th, 1714

Government
  - Mayor: Joao Antonio da Trindade

Area
  - Total: 208,918 sq mi (541,094 km^{2})
- Elevation: 3,100 ft (945 m)

Population (2022 Census)
  - Total: 38,776
  - Estimate (2025): 39,775
- Time zone: UTC−3 (BRT)
- CEP: 34800-000
- Area code: 31
- HDI (2010): 0.728 – high
- Website: www.caete.mg.gov.br

Caeté is a Brazilian municipality located in the state of Minas Gerais.

== Geography ==
The city belongs to the mesoregion Metropolitana de Belo Horizonte and to the microregion of Belo Horizonte.

The municipality contains a small part of the 31,270 hectares (77,300 acres) Serra do Gandarela National Park, created in 2014.

== Etymology ==
The name Caeté is derived from the local term for some Marantaceae, in particular Stromanthe and Thalia. In another version, "Caeté" originates from Old Tupi, meaning "true forest" or "virgin forest", derived from the combination of the terms ka'a ("forest") and eté ("true").

== Sports ==
44.9% of its population are fans of Cruzeiro while 40.2% prefer Atlético-MG.

== See also ==
- List of municipalities in Minas Gerais
