= Pedro Ercílio Simon =

Brazilian priest (1941–2020)

- Archbishop of Passo Fundo
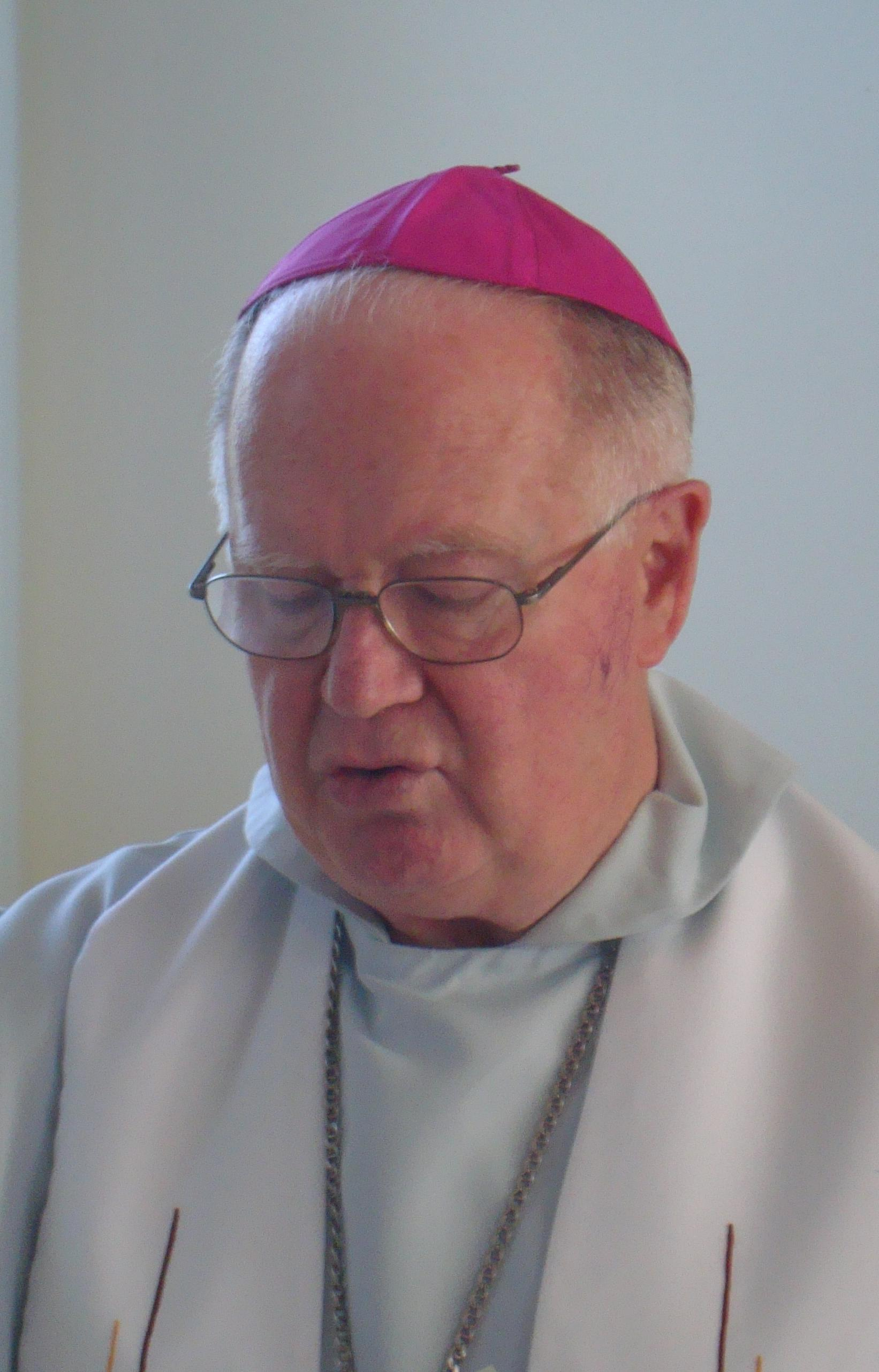
- Church: Catholic Church
- Archdiocese: Archdiocese of Passo Fundo
- In office: 19 May 1999 – 11 July 2012
- Predecessor: Urbano José Allgayer
- Successor: Antônio Carlos Altieri
- Previous posts: Coadjutor Bishop of Passo Fundo (1998-1999); Bishop of Uruguaiana (1995-1998); Coadjutor Bishop of Cruz Alta (1990-1995)

Orders
- Ordination: 12 December 1965
- Consecration: 30 December 1990 by Carlo Furno

Personal details
- Born: 9 September 1941 Lagoa Vermelha, São Pedro do Rio Grande do Sul, Republic of the United States of Brazil
- Died: 1 June 2020 (aged 78) Passo Fundo, Rio Grande do Sul, Brazil

Pedro Ercílio Simon (9 September 1941 – 1 June 2020) was a Brazilian Roman Catholic archbishop.

He was born in Brazil, and ordained to his denomination’s priesthood in 1965. He served in succession as

- (1990 to 1995) coadjutor bishop of the Diocese of Cruz Alta,
- (1995 to 1998) bishop of the Diocese of Uruguaiana,
- and (1998 to 2012, likewise in succession), coadjutor bishop, diocesan bishop, and archbishop, within the Roman Catholic Archdiocese of Passo Fundo.

Simon died from COVID-19 on 1 June 2020 in Passo Fundo, Brazil.
