= Diocese of Erexim =

Latin Catholic ecclesiastical territory in Brazil

Coordinates: 27.6346°S 52.2744°W

Diocese of Erechim Dioecesis Ereximensis

Catholic
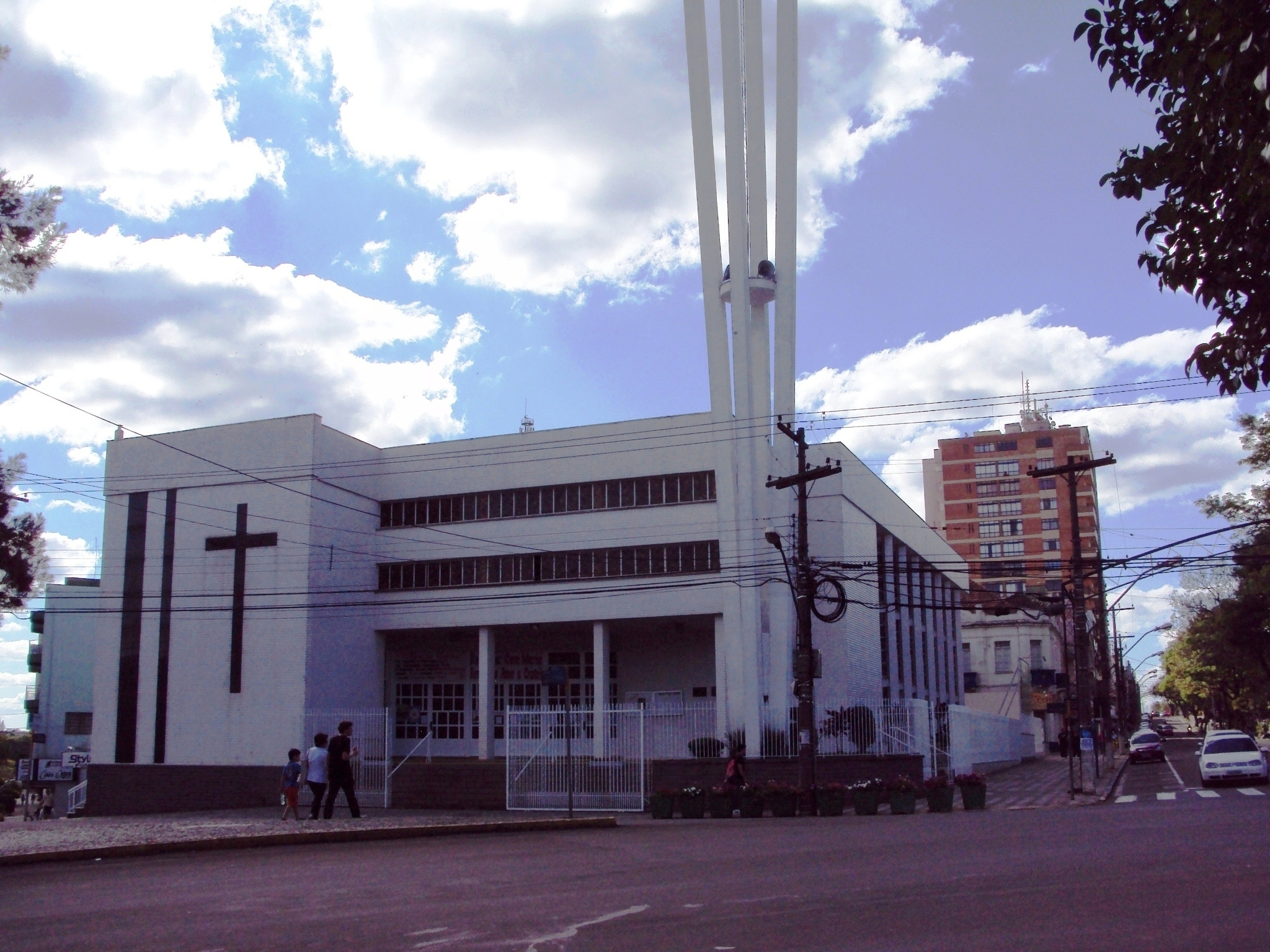
- Catedral São José in 2009

Location
- Country: Brazil
- Ecclesiastical province: Passo Fundo

Statistics
- Area: 5,586 km^{2} (2,157 sq mi)
- Population: Total; Catholics: (as of 2004); 213,005; 168,381 (79.1%)

Information
- Denomination: Catholic Church
- Sui iuris church: Latin Church
- Rite: Roman Rite
- Established: 27 May 1971 (55 years ago)
- Cathedral: Catedral São José

Current leadership
- Pope: Leo XIV
- Bishop: Adimir Antônio Mazali
- Metropolitan Archbishop: Rodolfo Luís Weber

Website
- www.diocesedeerexim.org.br

The Diocese of Erechim (Latin: Dioecesis Ereximensis) is a Latin Church ecclesiastical territory or diocese of the Catholic Church in Brazil. Its episcopal see is Erechim. The Diocese of Erexim is a suffragan diocese in the ecclesiastical province of the metropolitan Archdiocese of Passo Fundo.

== History ==
On May 27, 1971, it was established as the Diocese of Erechim from the then-Diocese of Passo Fundo. On June 6, 2012, it was made known by the Vatican News Service that Pope Benedict XVI had appointed the Father José Gilson, OFMCap, who until then had been serving as the Definitor General of the Capuchins in Rome, Italy, as the third bishop of the Diocese of Erechim, a part of the Ecclesiastical Province of Passo Fundo, Brazil. It was arranged that he would be ordained to the episcopacy and installed as Bishop of Erechim. He succeeds Bishop Girônimo Zanandréa, whose resigned upon reaching the age of 75, at which age all bishops must offer their resignation.

On June 26, 2019, Bishop Jose Gilson was transferred to head the Diocese of Caxias do Sul, while in April 2020, Pope Francis appointed Adimir Antônio Mazali as new Diocesan Bishop.

The Diocese of Erechim has an area of 5,586 (unit unspecified), a total population of 211,685, a Catholic population of 168,800, 64 priests, 15 permanent deacons, and 133 religious).

== Bishops ==
- Bishops of Erechim
  - Bishop João Aloysio Hoffmann (1971.05.27 – 1994.01.26)
  - Bishop João Aloysio Hoffmann (1971.05.27 — 1994.01.26)
  - Bishop Girônimo Zanandréa (1994.01.26 – 2012.06.06)
  - Bishop José Gislon, OFMCap (2012.06.06 – 2019.06.26), appointed Bishop of Caxias do Sul, Rio Grande do Sul
  - Bishop Adimir Antônio Mazali (2020.04.15 - present)

=== Coadjutor bishop ===
- Girônimo Zanandréa (1987-1994)
