= Girônimo Zanandréa =

Brazilian Roman Catholic bishop (1936–2019)

- Bishop of Erexim
- Church: Catholic Church
- Diocese: Diocese of Erexim
- In office: 26 January 1994 – 6 June 2012
- Predecessor: João Aloysio Hoffmann
- Successor: José Gislon
- Previous post: Coadjutor Bishop of Erexim (1987-1994)

Orders
- Ordination: 3 July 1964
- Consecration: 17 January 1988 by Carlo Furno

Personal details
- Born: 9 June 1936 São Valentim, São Pedro do Rio Grande do Sul, Republic of the United States of Brazil
- Died: 3 November 2019 (aged 83) Erechim, Rio Grande do Sul, Brazil

Girônimo Zanandréa (9 June 1936 – 3 November 2019) was a Brazilian Roman Catholic bishop.

Zanandréa was born in Brazil and was ordained to the priesthood in 1964. He served as coadjutor bishop of the Roman Catholic Diocese of Erexim, Brazil, from 1987 to 1994 and as the bishop of the Exerim Diocese from 1994 to 2012.
