= Diocese of Cruz Alta =

Catholic ecclesiastical territory

Diocese of Cruz Alta Dioecesis Crucis Altae

Catholic

Location
- Country: Brazil
- Ecclesiastical province: Santa Maria

Statistics
- Area: 16,325 km^{2} (6,303 sq mi)
- Population: Total; Catholics: (as of 2004); 396,259; 317,000 (80.0%)

Information
- Rite: Latin Rite
- Established: 15 June 1957 (55 years ago)
- Cathedral: Catedral Divino Espírito Santo

Current leadership
- Pope: Leo XIV
- Bishop: Nélio Domingos Zortea
- Metropolitan Archbishop: Leomar Antônio Brustolin

Website
- www.diocesecruzalta.org.br

The Roman Catholic Diocese of Cruz Alta (Latin: Dioecesis Crucis Altae) is a diocese located in the city of Cruz Alta in the ecclesiastical province of Santa Maria in Brazil.

== History ==
- 27 May 1971: Established as Diocese of Cruz Alta from the Diocese of Santa Maria

== Bishops ==
Bishops of Cruz Alta

- Walmor Battú Wichrowski (1971.05.27 – 1972.11.16)
- Nei Paulo Moretto (1972.11.16 – 1976.01.21), appointed Coadjutor Bishop of Caxias do Sul, Rio Grande do Sul
- Jacó Roberto Hilgert (1976.07.19 – 2002.05.08)
- Friedrich Heimler S.D.B. (2002.05.08 – 2014.06.11)
- Adelar Baruffi (2014.12.17 – 2021.09.22), appointed Archbishop of Cascavel
- Nélio Domingos Zortea (2023.03.29 – Present)

Coadjutor bishop

- Pedro Ercílio Simon (1990-1995), did not succeed to see; appointed Bishop of Uruguaiana, Rio Grande do Sul
