= Military saint =

Patron saints associated with the military

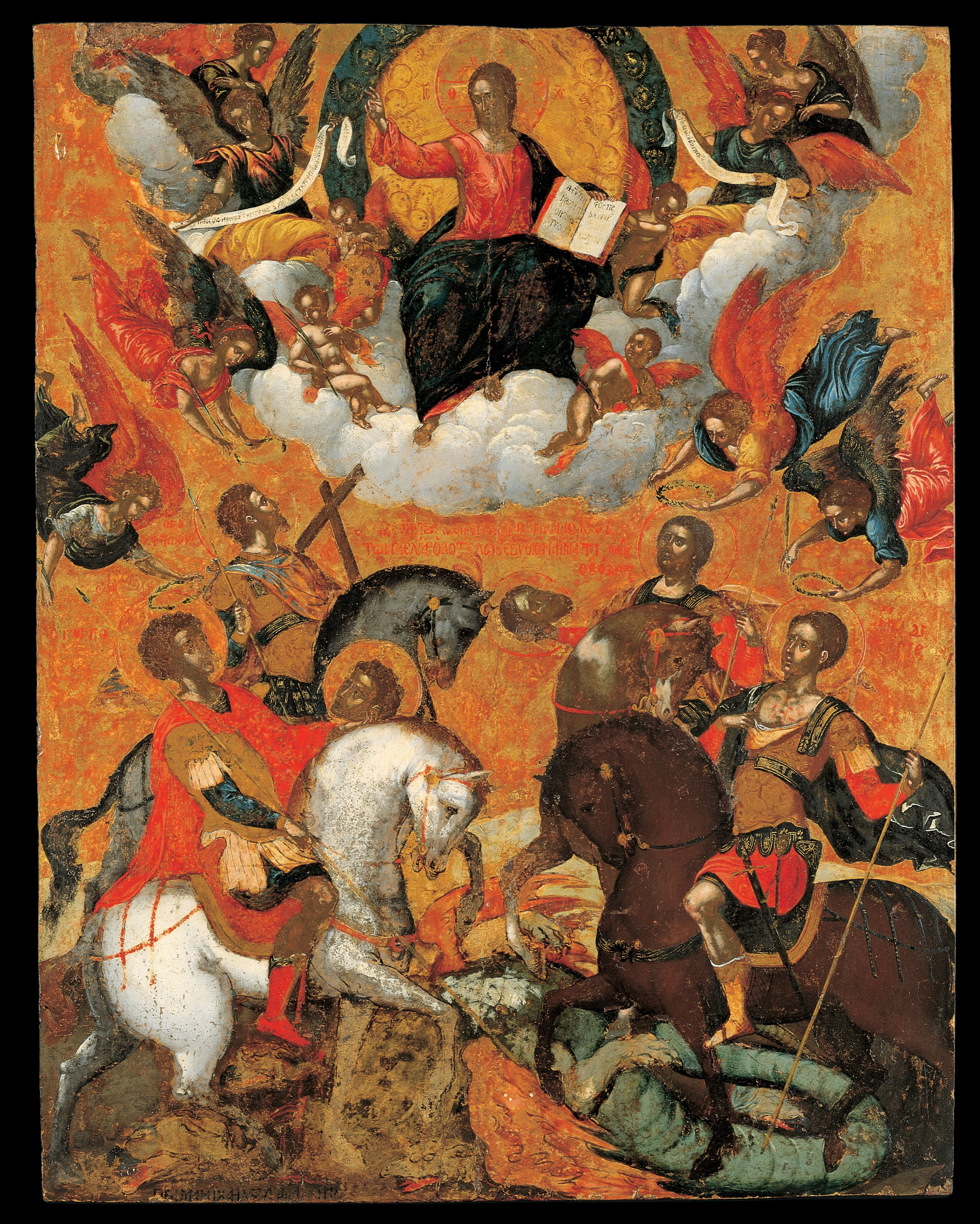
Four Military Saints by Michael Damaskinos (16th century, Benaki Museum), showing Saint George and Theodore of Amasea on the left, and Demetrius of Thessaloniki and Theodore Stratelates on the right, all on horseback, with angels holding wreaths over their heads, beneath Christ Pantocrator.

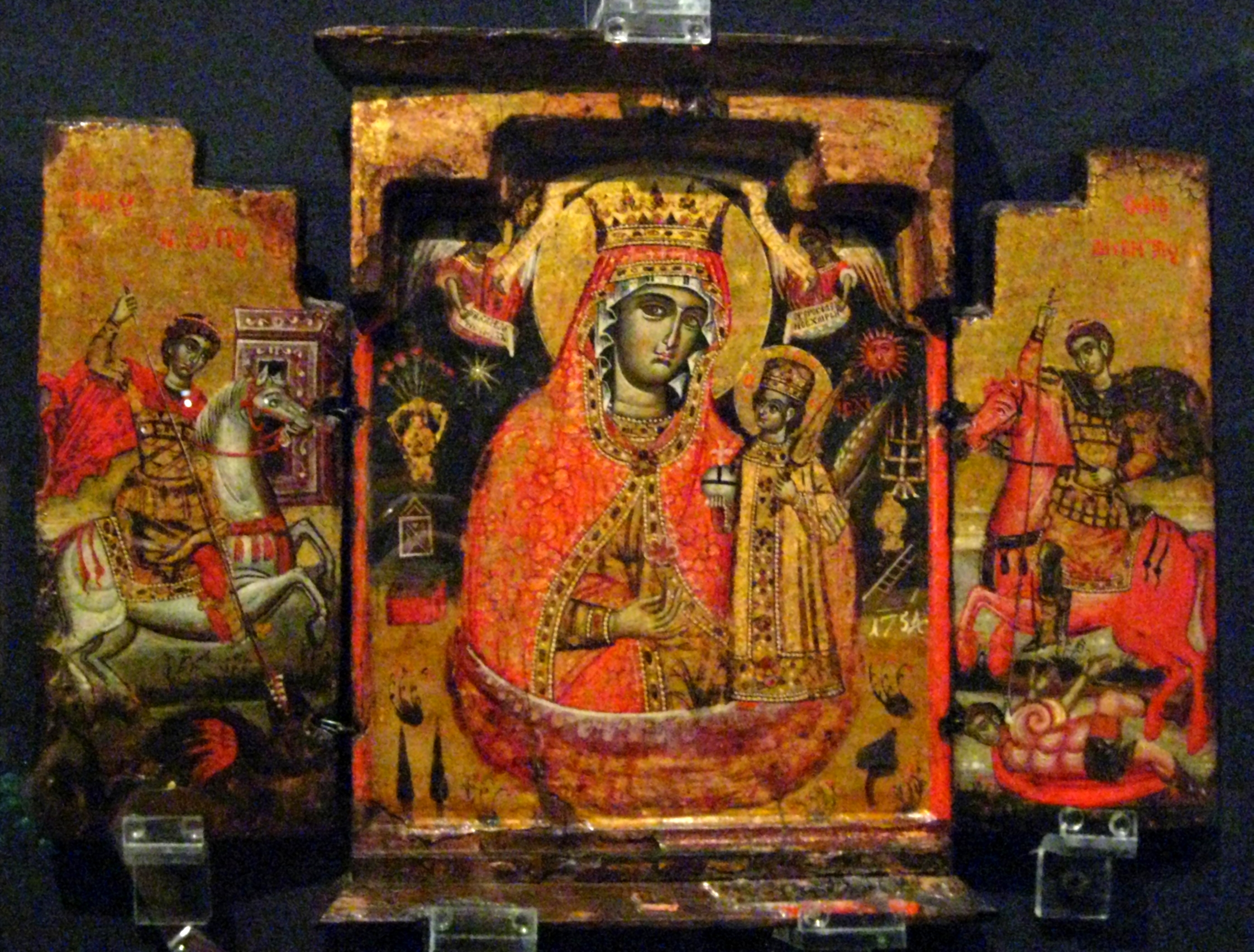
Triptych of the Bogomater flanked by Saints George and Demetrius as horsemen (dated 1754)

The military saints, warrior saints and soldier saints are patron saints, martyrs and other saints associated with the military. They were originally composed of the early Christians who were soldiers in the Roman army during the persecution of Christians, especially the Diocletianic Persecution of AD 303–313.

Most of the early Christian military saints were soldiers of the Roman Empire who had become Christian and, after refusing to participate in Imperial cult rituals of loyalty to the Roman Emperor, were subjected to corporal punishment including torture and martyrdom.

Veneration of these saints, most notably of Saint George, was reinforced in the Latin Church during the time of the Crusades. The title of "champion of Christ" (athleta Christi) was originally used for these saints, but in the late medieval period also conferred on contemporary rulers by the Pope.

Since the Middle Ages, more saints have been added for various military-related patronages.

== Hagiography ==
In Late Antiquity, Christian writers of hagiography, prominently including Sulpicius Severus in his account of the heroic, military life of Martin of Tours, created a literary model that reflected the new spiritual, political, and social ideals of a post-Roman society. In a study of Anglo-Saxon soldier saints (Damon 2003), J. E. Damon has demonstrated the persistence of Sulpicius's literary model in the transformation of the pious, peaceful saints and willing martyrs of late antique hagiography to the Christian heroes of the early Middle Ages, who appealed to the newly converted societies led by professional warriors and who exemplified accommodation with and eventually active participation in holy wars that were considered just.

== Iconography ==
The military saints are characteristically depicted as soldiers in traditional Byzantine iconography from about the 10th century (Macedonian dynasty) and especially in Slavic Christianity. While early icons show the saints in "classicizing" or anachronistic attire, icons from the 11th and especially the 12th centuries, painted in the new style of τύπων μιμήματα ("imitating nature"), are an important source of knowledge on medieval Byzantine military equipment.

The angelic prototype of the Christian soldier-saint is the Archangel Michael, whose earliest known cultus began in the 5th century with a shrine at Monte Gargano. The iconography of soldier-saints Theodore and George as cavalrymen develops in the early medieval period. The earliest image of

St Theodore as a horseman (named in Latin) is from Vinica, North Macedonia and, if genuine, dates to the 6th or 7th century. Here, Theodore is not slaying a dragon, but holding a draco standard. Three equestrian saints, Demetrius, Theodore and George, are depicted in the "Zoodochos Pigi" chapel in central Macedonia in Greece, in the prefecture of Kilkis, near the modern village of Kolchida, dated to the 9th or 10th century. The "dragon-slaying" motif develops in the 10th century, especially iconography seen in the Cappadocian cave churches of Göreme, where frescoes of the 10th century show military saints on horseback confronting serpents with one, two or three heads. In later medieval Byzantine iconography, the pair of horsemen is no longer identified as Theodore and George, but as George and Demetrius.

== List ==
=== Catholic ===
(NB: some saints on the list remain unclassified as of 2021)

Image	Name	Martyrdom	Location	Church	Patronage
	Agathius	303	Byzantium	Catholic Church, Eastern Orthodox Church	Soldiers
	Adrian of Nicomedia	306	Nicomedia	Catholic Church, Coptic Orthodox Church, Eastern Orthodox Church	Soldiers, Royal guard
	Andrew the General	300	Taurus Mountains	Catholic Church, Eastern Orthodox Church	Army, soldiers
Demetrius of Thessaloniki, 12th century Greek mosaic from Kiev	Demetrius of Thessaloniki	306	Thessaloniki	Anglicanism, Catholic Church, Eastern Orthodox Church, Lutheranism, Oriental Orthodox Churches	Soldiers
	Barbara	267		Aglipayan, Anglicanism, Catholic Church, Eastern Orthodox Church, Oriental Orthodox Churches	Artillery, combat engineer, missileers including those of the Strategic Rocket Forces, the Missile and Artillery Forces, and the Air Defense Forces, Space Forces and the United States Army Field Artillery and Air Defense Artillery Branches
Saint Cornelius and the Angel	Cornelius the Centurion	Pre-Congregation	unknown	Anglican Communion, Catholic Church, Eastern Orthodox Church	Soldiers
	Chrysogonus	303	Aquileia	Catholic Church, Eastern Orthodox Church	City of Zadar, 23rd Regiment of Austrian Landwehr, 158th division of Royal Italian Army, 112th brigade and 7th regiment of the Croatian army
	George	303	Nicomedia in Bithynia	Anglicanism, Catholic Church, Eastern Orthodox Church, Lutheranism, Oriental Orthodox Churches	Patronages
Saint Gereon, by a 15th-century German artist	Gereon	304	Cologne	Catholic Church, Coptic Orthodox Church, Eastern Orthodox Church	Knights
	James the Great	44	Jerusalem	Anglicanism, Catholic Church, Eastern Orthodox Church, Lutheranism, Oriental Orthodox Churches	Soldiers, knights, Military Archbishopric of Spain
	Joan of Arc	1431	Rouen, Normandy	Catholic	Military personnel, US Women's Army Corps, WAVES
	John the Warrior	4th century	Somewhere in Constantinople (modern Istanbul)	Catholic Church, Eastern Orthodox Church	Soldiers
	Ignatius of Loyola	1556	Rome, Papal States	Anglican Communion, Catholic	Soldiers, Military Ordinariate of the Philippines
, Saint Maurice by Matthias Grünewald	Maurice	287	Agaunum in Alpes Poeninae et Graiae	Catholic Church, Coptic Orthodox Church of Alexandria, Eastern Orthodox Church, Oriental Orthodox Churches	Alpine troops, Swiss Guard
Saint Martin of Tours from the Grandes Heures of Anne of Brittany.	Martin of Tours	397	Candes-Saint-Martin, Gaul	Catholic and Eastern Orthodox Church	US Army Quartermaster Corps, infantrymen,
	Mercurius	250	Caesarea in Cappadocia	Catholic Church, Eastern Orthodox Church, Oriental Orthodox Churches	
	Michael the Archangel			Anglicanism, Catholic Church, Eastern Orthodox Church, Lutheranism, Oriental Orthodox Churches	Military; paratroopers; policemen.
	Our Lady of Mount Carmel	1226		Catholic	Spanish Navy
	Our Lady of Loretto			Catholic	Airmen
	Pope John XXIII			Catholic	Italian Army
	Sebastian	288	Italy	Aglipayan, Anglicanism, Catholic Church, Eastern Orthodox Church, Oriental Orthodox Churches	Soldiers, infantrymen, archers
	Sergius and Bacchus	306	Resafa and Barbalissos in Mesopotamia	Assyrian Church of the East, Catholic Church, Coptic Orthodox Church, Eastern Orthodox Church, Oriental Orthodox Churches	Army, soldiers
	Theodore of Amasea	306	Amasea Amasya in Helenopontus	Catholic Church and Eastern Orthodox Church	Soldiers
	Typasius	304	Tigava, Mauretania Caesariensis		
	Vardan Mamikonian	451	Avarayr Plain, Vaspurakan, Armenia	Armenian Apostolic Church, Armenian Catholic Church, Armenian Evangelical Church	
	Varus	307	Alexandria	Coptic Churches	
	Victor Maurus	303	Milan	Catholic Church, Eastern Orthodox Church, Lutheranism	
	Forty Martyrs of Sebaste	320	Sebaste		

=== Eastern Orthodox Church ===
In the Romanian Orthodox Church:

- Michael the Archangel: protector of the Romanian Army, and, as the patron saint of Michael the Brave and as the symbol of the Romanian victory in the Great War, the protector of the unity of all Romanians.
- Saint George: patron of the Romanian Land Forces
- Saint Elijah: patron of the Romanian Air Forces
- Virgin Mary: patron of the Romanian Naval Forces

==== Russian Orthodox Church ====
Icon	Name	Patronage
	George	Russian Armed Forces, Russian Ground Forces
	Michael the Archangel	Russian Armed Forces, Russian National Guard
	Alexander Nevsky	Russian Ground Forces, Russian Naval Infantry, Russian Special Operations Forces
	Elijah	Russian Aerospace Forces, Russian Airborne Forces
	Andrew the First-Called	Russian Navy
	Nicholas the Wonderworker	Russian Navy
	Fyodor Ushakov	Russian Navy
	Barbara	Strategic Rocket Forces
	Daniel of Moscow	Russian Engineer Troops
	Boris and Gleb	Russian Railway Troops
	Dmitry Donskoy	Military Police of the Russian Armed Forces
	Seraphim of Sarov	12th Chief Directorate
	John of Kronstadt	Financial and Economic Service of the Russian Armed Forces
	Joseph Volotsky	Logistical Support of the Russian Armed Forces
	Archangel Gabriel	State Secret Protection Service of the Russian Armed Forces
	Sergius of Radonezh	Russian Construction Troops
	Theodore Stratelates	Orthodox soldiers.
	Nikita the Goth	Orthodox soldiers.
	Mercury of Smolensk	Warrior-martyr: soldiers.
	John the Warrior	Soldiers.
	Vladimir of Kiev	
	Isaiah	
	Alexander Peresvet and Rodion Oslyabya	Radonezhskiy holy monk-warriors.

== See also ==
- Christians in the military
- Saint George: Devotions, traditions and prayers
- Military ordinariate
- Military order (monastic society)
- Miles Christianus
- New Testament military metaphors
- List of patron saints by occupation and activity
- Roman Catholic Archdiocese for the Military Services, USA § Patron Saints
- List of pharaohs deified during lifetime
