= Basilica Shrine of Our Lady Mediatrix of All Graces =

Coordinates: 29.6998°S 53.8108°W

- Basílica Santuário Nossa Senhora Medianeira de Todas as Graças
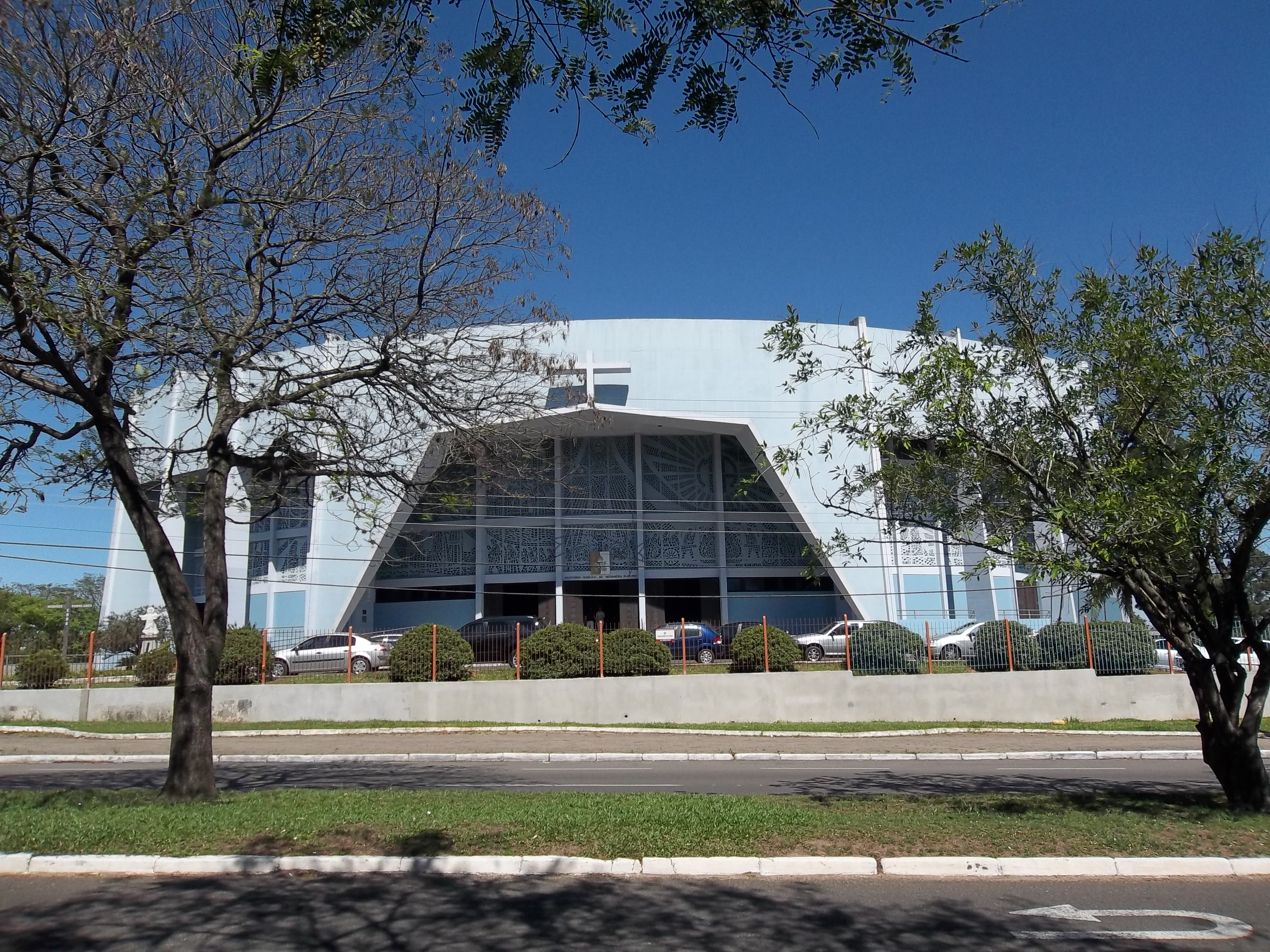
- Basilica Shrine of Our Lady Mediatrix of All Graces
- Location: Santa Maria
- Country: Brazil
- Denomination: Roman Catholic Church

The Basilica Shrine of Our Lady Mediatrix of All Graces (Portuguese: Basílica Santuário Nossa Senhora Medianeira de Todas as Graças) or the Basilica of Santa Maria is a Catholic church dedicated to the Virgin Mary, located in Santa Maria municipality, Rio Grande do Sul, in the south of Brazil. It is the only basilica in the world dedicated to Mary the Mediatrix of all Graces.

The basilica gives its name to the avenue and the neighborhood where it is located, on the other hand it is the end point of the Pilgrimage of the "medianera".

The devotion to the Mediatrix Virgin began in 1928, with the arrival of the Jesuits. In 1935, Don Antonio Reis blessed the first stone, beginning the work of building the sanctuary. In 1942, the bishops of Rio Grande do Sul consecrated the state to the Mediator Virgin declaring her the Chief Patroness of the state. In 1943, on the initiative of Don Antonio Reis, the first romeria (a group religious pilgrimage) was held in the state. The church was declared a Basilica in 1987 during the pontificate of Pope John Paul II.

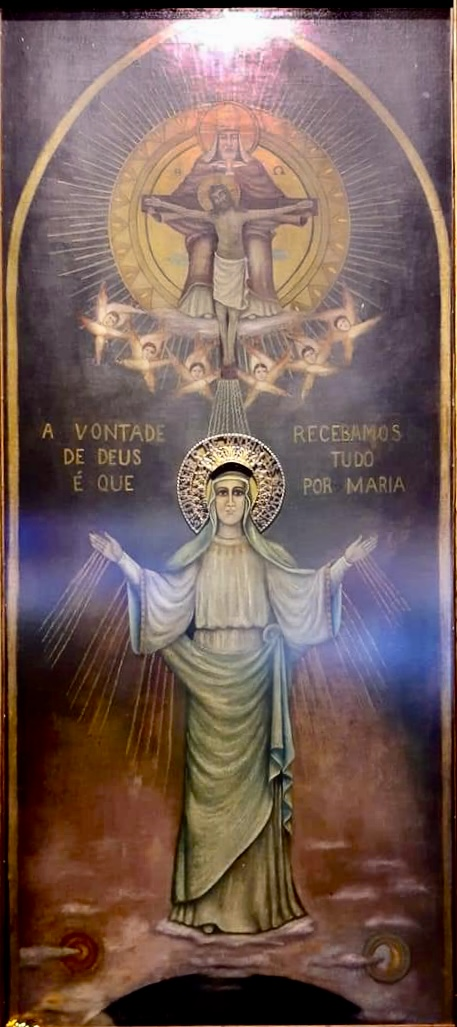
Our Lady, Mediatrix of All Graces

The basilica is home to the venerated icon of Our Lady Mediatrix of All Graces, the Queen of the Gauchos. On May 31, 2024, Pope Francis authorized the canonical coronation of the Marian icon through a decree issued by the Dicastery for Divine Worship and the Discipline of the Sacraments. The coronation ceremony was presided by the Archbishop of Santa Maria, Leomar Antônio Brustolin, on August 15, 2024.

== See also ==
- Roman Catholicism in Brazil
- Our Lady Mediatrix of All Graces
