= Tigava =

See Leistarcha scitissimella for the moth species also known as Tigava scitissimella

Tigava was an ancient Roman-Berber town and bishopric in Roman Africa, which remains a Latin Catholic titular see.

It corresponds with the modern locality of El-Kherba in Algeria.

== History ==
Tigava was one of many cities in the Roman province of Mauretania Caesariensis which were important enough to become a suffragan of the Metropolitan Archbishopric in its capital Caesarea Mauretaniae (modern Cherchell), but like most faded.

Saint Typasius was a veteran of the Roman garrison.

== Titular see ==
Tigava's diocese is included in the Catholic Church's list of titular bishoprics since it was nominally restored in 1933.

It has had the following incumbents, so far of the fitting Episcopal (lowest) rank :

- Basile Tanghe, Capuchin Franciscans (O.F.M. Cap.) (1935.01.28 – death 1947.12.16) as first Apostolic Vicar of Belgian Ubangui (Congo-Kinshasa, then Belgian; now Molegbe diocese) (1935.01.28 – 1947.12.16), previously last Apostolic Prefect of Belgian Ubangui (1931.10.16 – 1935.01.28)
- Alfonse Bossart, Missionary Oblates of Mary Immaculate (O.M.I.) (1948.02.12 – death 1963.03.03) as first Apostolic Vicar of Ipamu (Congo-Kinshasa; now Idiofa diocese) (1948.02.12 – 1957) and on emeritate; previously last Apostolic Prefect of Ipamu (1937.06.11 – 1948.02.12)
- John Louis Morkovsky (1963.04.16 – 1975.04.22) as Coadjutor Bishop of Galveston–Houston (Texas, USA) (1963.04.16 – 1975.04.22), succeeded as Bishop of Galveston–Houston (1975.04.22 – retired 1984.08.21); previously Titular Bishop of Hieron (1955.12.22 – 1958.08.18) as Auxiliary Bishop of Amarillo (Texas, USA) (1955.12.22 – 1958.08.18), succeeding as Bishop of Amarillo (1958.08.18 – 1963.04.16); died 1990
- Bernhard Rieger (1984.12.20 – death 2013.04.10) as Auxiliary Bishop of Rottenburg–Stuttgart (Germany) (1984.12.20 – 1996.07.31) and on emeritate
- Leomar Antônio Brustolin (2015.01.07 – 2021.06.02) as Auxiliary Bishop of Porto Alegre (Brazil)
- Hiansen Vieira Franco (2025 - presently) as Auxiliary Bishop of Arquidiocese de São Sebastião do Rio de Janeiro.
