= Hieron (Caria) =

Town of ancient Caria

Coordinates: 37°35′55″N 27°25′33″E

Hieron was an ancient city and former bishopric in ancient Caria, Asia Minor, which remains a Latin Catholic titular see as Hieron.

== History ==
Hieron, now Avsarkale in Asian Turkey, was important enough in the Roman province of Caria (civil Diocese of Asia) to become a suffragan of its capital Stauropolis's Metropolitan, in the sway of the Patriarchate of Constantinople.

It has no historically documented bishops, but was mentioned in the Byzantine Empire's Notitia Episcopatuum, from the edition of pseudo-Epifanio, under emperor Heraclius I (circa 640), until Byzantine emperor Leo VI (early tenth century) and existed still in the thirteenth century.

== Titular see ==
The diocese was nominally restored in 1933: Established as Latin Titular bishopric of Hieron (Latin) / Geron (Curiate Italian) / Hieritan(us) (Latin adjective)

It has had the following incumbents, so far of the fitting Episcopal (lowest) rank :

- Theodor Breher (白化東 / 브레허 白화동 주교), Missionary Benedictines (O.S.B.) (1937.04.13 – 1946.04.11) as only Apostolic Vicar of Yanji 延吉 (China) (1937.04.13 – 1946.04.11); previously only Apostolic Prefect of Yanji 延吉 (China) (1929.02.05 – 1937.04.13); later first Bishop of Yanji 延吉 (China) (1946.04.11 – death 1950.11.02)
- John Louis Morkovsky (1955.12.22 – 1958.08.18) as Auxiliary Bishop of Diocese of Amarillo (Texas, USA) (1955.12.22 – 1958.08.18); later succeeded as Bishop of Amarillo (1958.08.18 – 1963.04.16), Titular Bishop of Tigava (1963.04.16 – 1975.04.22) as Coadjutor Bishop of Galveston–Houston (Texas, USA) (1963.04.16 – 1975.04.22) succeeding as Bishop of Galveston–Houston (USA) (1975.04.22 – retired 1984.08.21), died 1990
- Léo Blais (1959.03.18 – death 1991.01.21) as emeritate, previously Bishop of Prince-Albert (Canada) (1952.07.04 – 1959.02.28) and Auxiliary Bishop of Archdiocese of Montréal (Quebec, Canada) (1959.03.18 – 1971.05.11)
- Gerard Clifford (1991.03.25 – death 2016.12.12), first as Auxiliary Bishop of Archdiocese of Armagh (Northern Ireland, UK) (1991.03.25 – 2013.02.27) and as emeritate
- Michael Joseph Boulette (2017.01.23 – ...) as Auxiliary Bishop of Archdiocese of San Antonio (Texas, USA) (2017.01.23 – ...).

== Sources and external links ==
- GCatholic
