= Diocese of Caxias do Sul =

Latin Catholic diocese in Brazil

Coordinates: 29.1690°S 51.1794°W

Diocese of Caxias do Sul Dioecesis Caxiensis Australis

Catholic
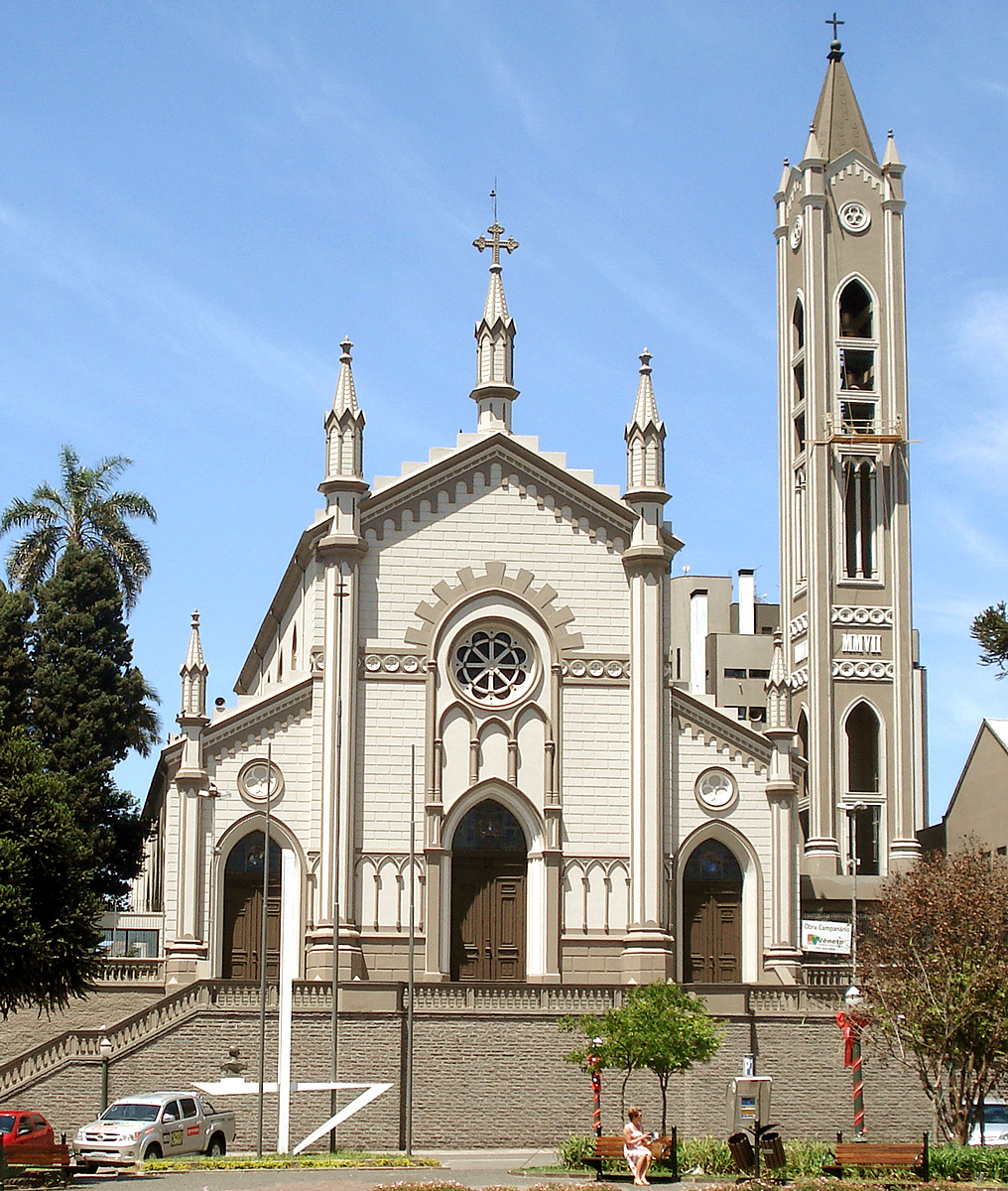
- Cathedral of St. Teresa of Ávila

Location
- Country: Brazil
- Ecclesiastical province: Porto Alegre

Statistics
- Area: 11,034 km^{2} (4,260 sq mi)
- Population: Total; Catholics: (as of 2004); 742,481; 668,232 (90.0%)

Information
- Denomination: Catholic Church
- Sui iuris church: Latin Church
- Rite: Roman Rite
- Established: 8 September 1934 (92 years ago)
- Cathedral: Cathedral of St. Teresa of Ávila

Current leadership
- Pope: Leo XIV
- Bishop: José Gislon, OFMCap
- Metropolitan Archbishop: Jaime Spengler
- Bishops emeritus: Alessandro Carmelo Ruffinoni, CS

Website
- www.diocesedecaxias.org.br

The Diocese of Caxias do Sul (Latin: Dioecesis Caxiensis Australis) is a Latin Church diocese of the Catholic Church located in the city of Caxias do Sul in the ecclesiastical province of Archdiocese of Porto Alegre in Brazil.

On Wednesday, 16 June 2010, Pope Benedict XVI appointed Auxiliary Bishop Alessandro Carmelo Ruffinoni, CS, then the auxiliary bishop to the Archbishop of Porto Alegre, as the Coadjutor Bishop of Caxias do Sul, to succeed Bishop Moretto.

== History ==
- 8 September 1934: Established as Diocese of Caxias from territory of the Archdiocese of Porto Alegre
- 19 October 1966: Renamed as Diocese of Caxias do Sul

== Bishops ==
- Bishops of Caxias do Sul, in reverse chronological order
  - Bishop José Gislon, OFMCap (2019.06.26 - present)
  - Bishop Alessandro Carmelo Ruffinoni, CS (2011.07.06 – 2019.06.26)
  - Bishop Nei Paulo Moretto (1983.05.26 – 2011.07.06)
  - Bishop Benedito Zorzi (1966.10.19 – 1983.05.26)
- Bishops of Caxias (Roman Rite)
  - Bishop Benedito Zorzi (1952.06.24 – 1966.10.19)
  - Bishop José Baréa (1935.09.23 – 1951.11.19)

=== Coadjutor bishops ===
- Nei Paulo Moretto (1976-1983)
- Alessandro Carmelo Ruffinoni, CS (2010-2011)

=== Auxiliary bishop ===
- Cândido Julio Bampi, OFMCap (1957-1978)

=== Other priests of this diocese who became bishops ===
- Neri José Tondello, appointed Bishop of Juína, Mato Grosso in 2008
- Vital Corbellini, appointed Bishop of Marabá, Para in 2012
- Adelar Baruffi, appointed Bishop of Cruz Alta, Rio Grande do Sul in 2014
- Leomar Antônio Brustolin, appointed Auxiliary Bishop of Porto Alegre, Rio Grande do Sul Brazil in 2015
