= Leistarcha thaumastica =

Scientific classification
- Domain: Eukaryota
- Kingdom: Animalia
- Phylum: Arthropoda
- Class: Insecta
- Order: Lepidoptera
- Family: Xyloryctidae
- Genus: Leistarcha
- Species: L. thaumastica

Binomial name
- Leistarcha thaumastica (Turner, 1946)

Synonyms
- Machimia thaumastica Turner, 1946

Species of moth

Leistarcha thaumastica is a moth in the family Xyloryctidae. It was described by Alfred Jefferis Turner in 1946. It is found in Australia, where it has been recorded from New South Wales.
