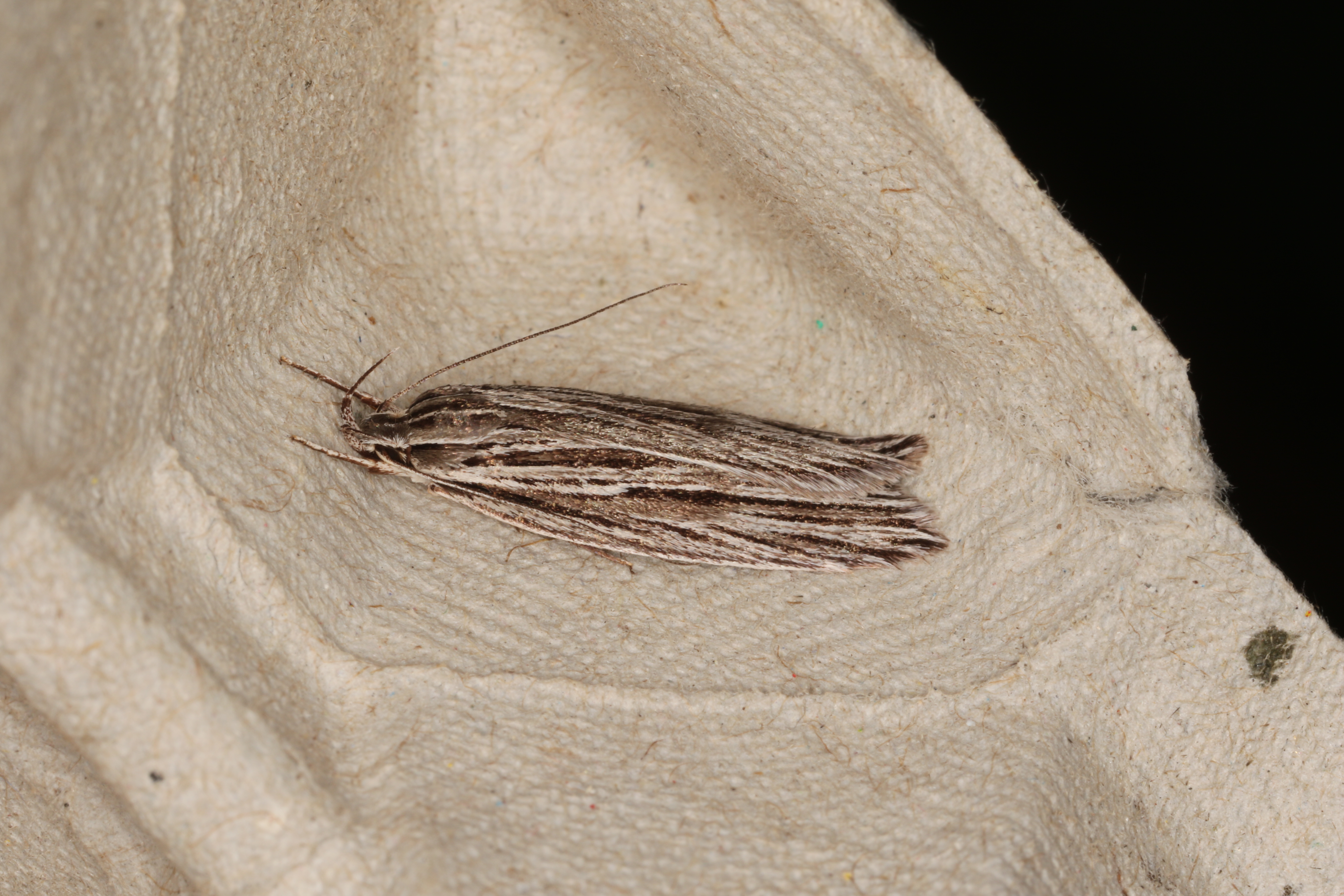

Scientific classification
- Kingdom: Animalia
- Phylum: Arthropoda
- Class: Insecta
- Order: Lepidoptera
- Family: Xyloryctidae
- Genus: Leistarcha
- Species: L. amphigramma

Binomial name
- Leistarcha amphigramma (Meyrick, 1915)

Synonyms
- Cryptolechia amphigramma Meyrick, 1915

= Leistarcha amphigramma =

Species of moth

Leistarcha amphigramma is a moth in the family Xyloryctidae. It was described by Edward Meyrick in 1915. It is found in Australia, where it has been recorded from the Australian Capital Territory and New South Wales.

The wingspan is about 28 mm. The forewings are fuscous mixed with darker and with the veins mostly outlined by pairs of very fine white lines, those of 6 and 9 and the upper margin of the cell obsolete, the interspaces between the veins marked with suffused blackish streaks. There is a white streak through the middle of the cell from the base and the costal edge is finely white, the dorsal edge blackish. The hindwings are grey, darker posteriorly.
