= Typasius =

Typasius (Italian: Tipasio) (died 11 January 304) is venerated as a military saint by the Catholic Church. His feast day is 11 January.

== Legend ==
The Passio Typasii records that Typasius was a veteran of Tigava (today El Kherba), in the Roman province of Mauretania Caesariensis. Called to service by Maximian against the native Quinquegentiani, who were revolting against Roman rule, Typasius, who had become a Christian, refused to participate in this campaign. He had retired from military life. This brought him in direct confrontation with the authorities. As his legend records:

He was forced into active service again by his praepositus, and along with other vexillarii
went to battle. But the day before the battle the emperor Maximianus had wished to make a
donative to the soldiers. That night the angel Gabriel visited most blessed Typasius and
advised him one after the other of all the things that were going to happen. Morning came, and
when Maximianus Augustus was making the role-call on the parade-ground and the name of the
most blessed Typasius was read out loud, he declined to accept the gold from the hand of
Maximianus and declared that he was a soldier of Christ. When Maximianus became annoyed at
him, holy Typasius responded, "Do not be agitated, honoured emperor. If you release me to
serve Christ, you will both overcome those barbarians without a struggle, and within forty
days victory will be reported not only from the East and Gaul, but also from Britain and
Egypt. Maximian Augustus said, "You can have what you want, if you fulfil your promise."
Immediately he ordered him to be placed under guard, so that he might pay the penalty if what
he had predicted should not prove true. The praepositus of the cuneus grabbed him straight-:away and cast him in irons.

It came to pass that Maximian was able to crush the rebels and thus fulfill Typasius' prophecy. Typasius received an honorable discharge with the whole army as witness. Typasius returned home and put away his weapons and military belt and built a monastery for himself on his land, where he remained for a long time.

However, after some years he was brought again to the authorities to enlist for active service and asked to sacrifice to the Roman gods. Typasius refused to do either. His belt and spears were then forcefully attached and handed to him; miraculously, his belt was immediately torn into pieces, and his spears were shattered.

Typasius was then taken into custody and soon cured the squire of the comes Claudius, who had interrogated him, from a seizure. When Typasius was ordered to offer sacrifice once again to the gods, Claudius was unable to save him and reluctantly read the sentence. Typasius was beheaded. The men who had instigated his death burned with fever and pain and lost control of their limbs and bowels and they died.
