= Friedrich Heimler =

German-born Brazilian Roman Catholic bishop (1942–2018)

Friedrich Heimler SDB
- Bishop of Cruz Alta
- Church: Catholic Church
- Diocese: Diocese of Cruz Alta
- In office: 8 May 2002 – 11 June 2014
- Predecessor: Jacó Roberto Hilgert
- Successor: Adelar Baruffi
- Previous post: Coadjutor Bishop of Umuarama (1998-2002)

Orders
- Ordination: 12 July 1970
- Consecration: 31 January 1999 by Vitório Pavanello

Personal details
- Born: 17 February 1942 Hohenburg, Gau Bayreuth, Nazi Germany
- Died: 7 November 2018 (aged 76) Campo Grande, Mato Grosso do Sul, Brazil

Friedrich Heimler (17 February 1942 – 7 November 2018) was a Brazilian Roman Catholic bishop.

Heimler was born in Germany and was ordained to the priesthood in 1970. He served as coadjutor bishop of the Roman Catholic Diocese of Umuarama, Brazil, from 1998 to 2002. He then served as bishop of the Roman Catholic Diocese of Cruz Alta from 2002 until 2014.
