= São Romédio Community =

São Romédio Community Comunidade de São Romédio
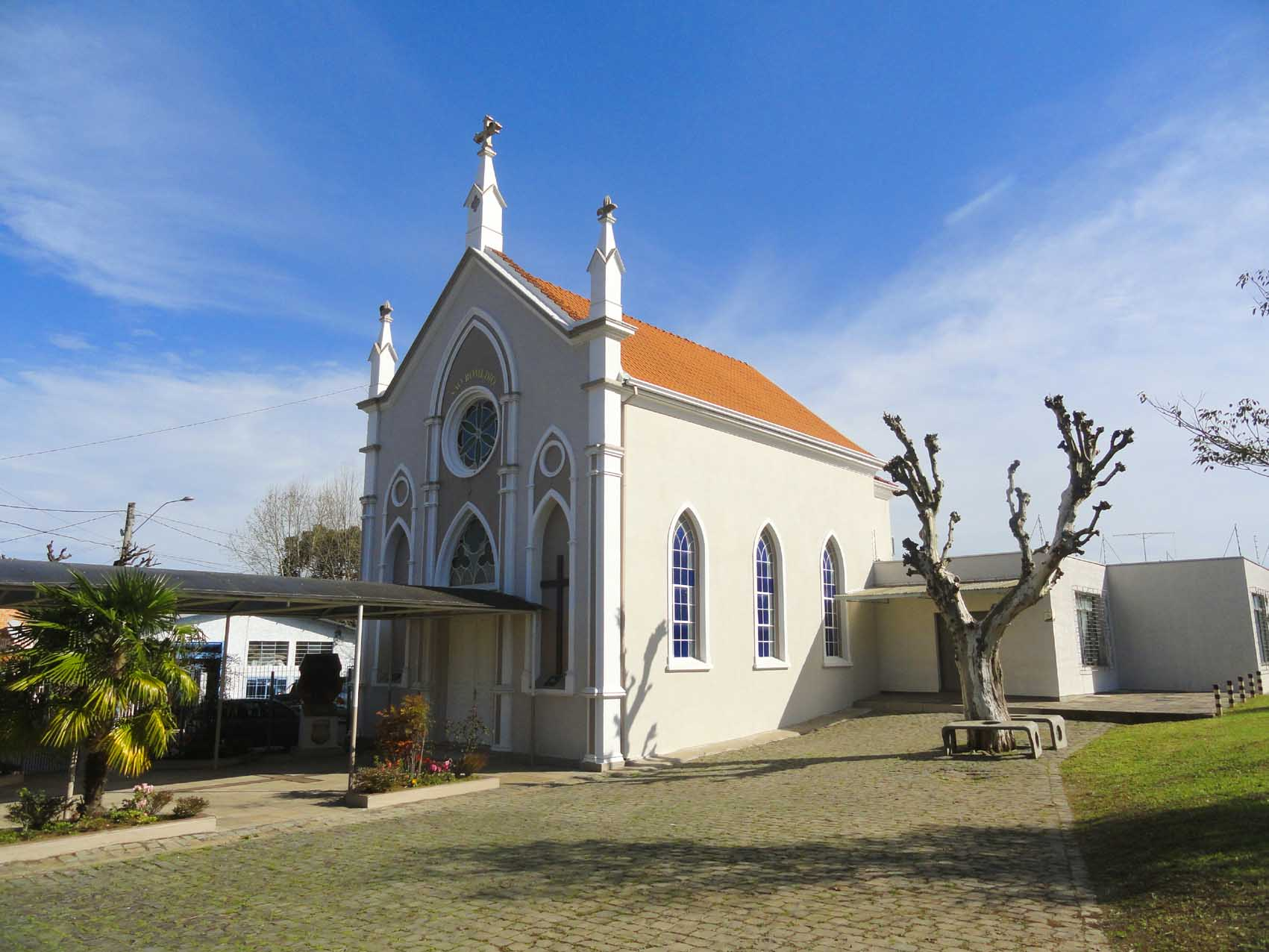

- Location of the Community of São Romédio
- Coordinates: 29°10′S 51°10′W
- Country: Brazil
- Neighbourhood: Caxias do Sul
- Demonym: Italian
- Official languages: Portuguese

The São Romédio Community (Portuguese: Comunidade de São Romédio) is an historic neighbourhood in Caxias do Sul, Brazil.

== History ==
The community was founded in mid-1876 during the Italian colonization of the Rio Grande do Sul. (Some immigrants had already arrived at Caxias do Sul before 1876.) The majority of immigrants came from Sanzeno, Trentino.

Its church, named for Saint Romedius, was an early point of reference for the settlers, and is still a point of aggregation and historical and cultural heritage of the Rio Grande do Sul.

In 2016, the community celebrated the 140th anniversary of its founding and the local press gave great importance to the event, acknowledging its history.

== Gallery ==
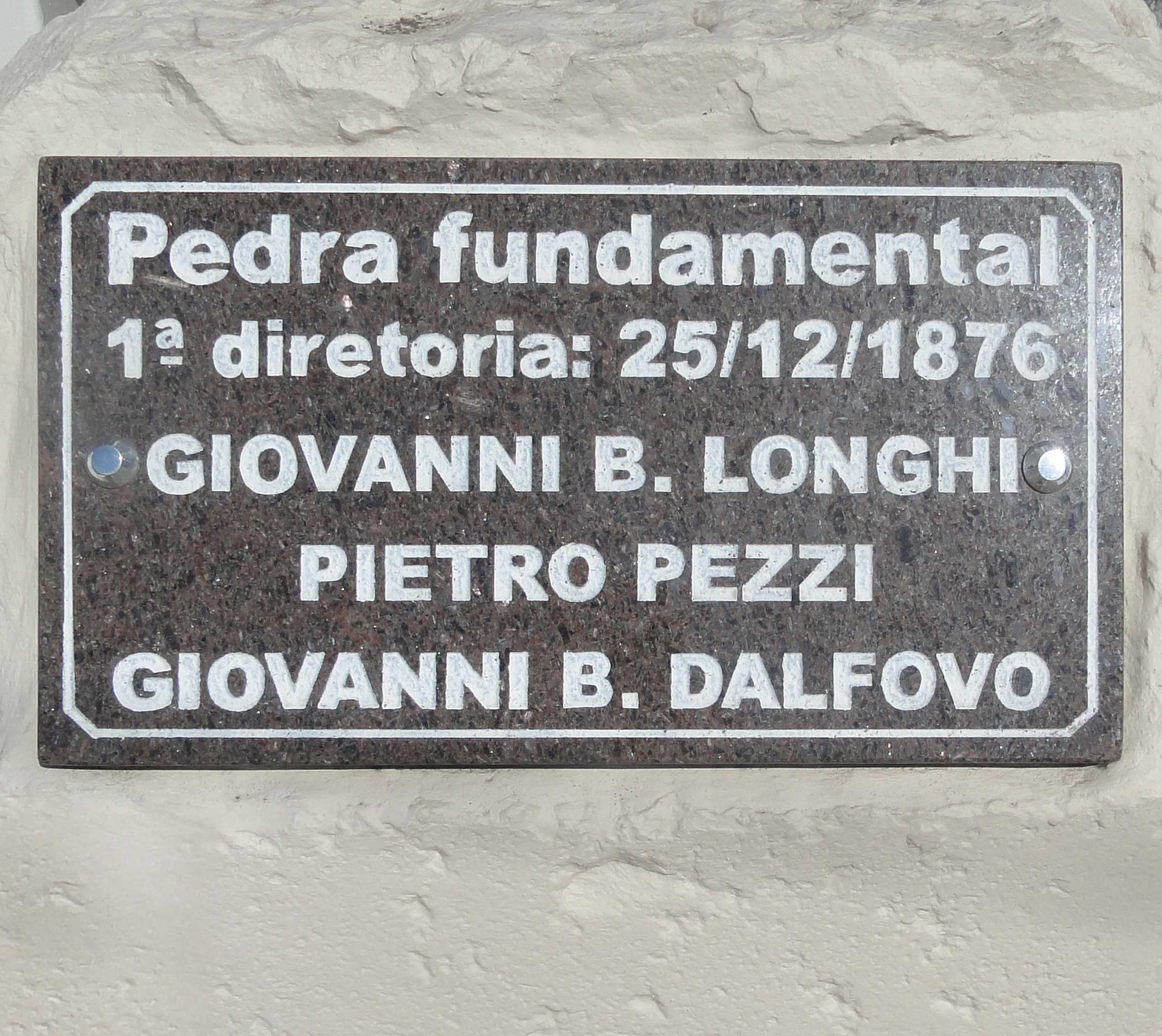
Plate on cornerstone

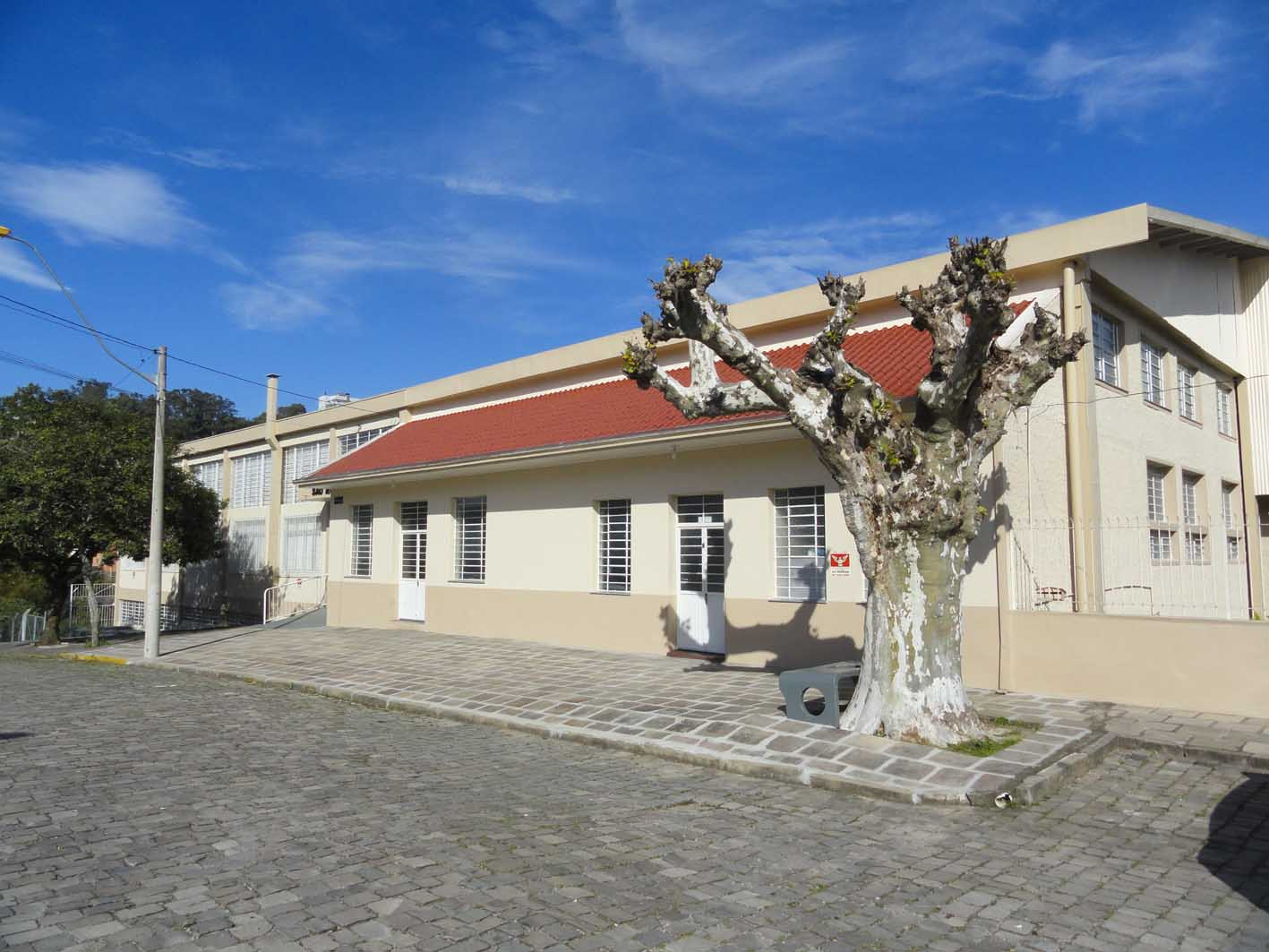
The meetings and parties area

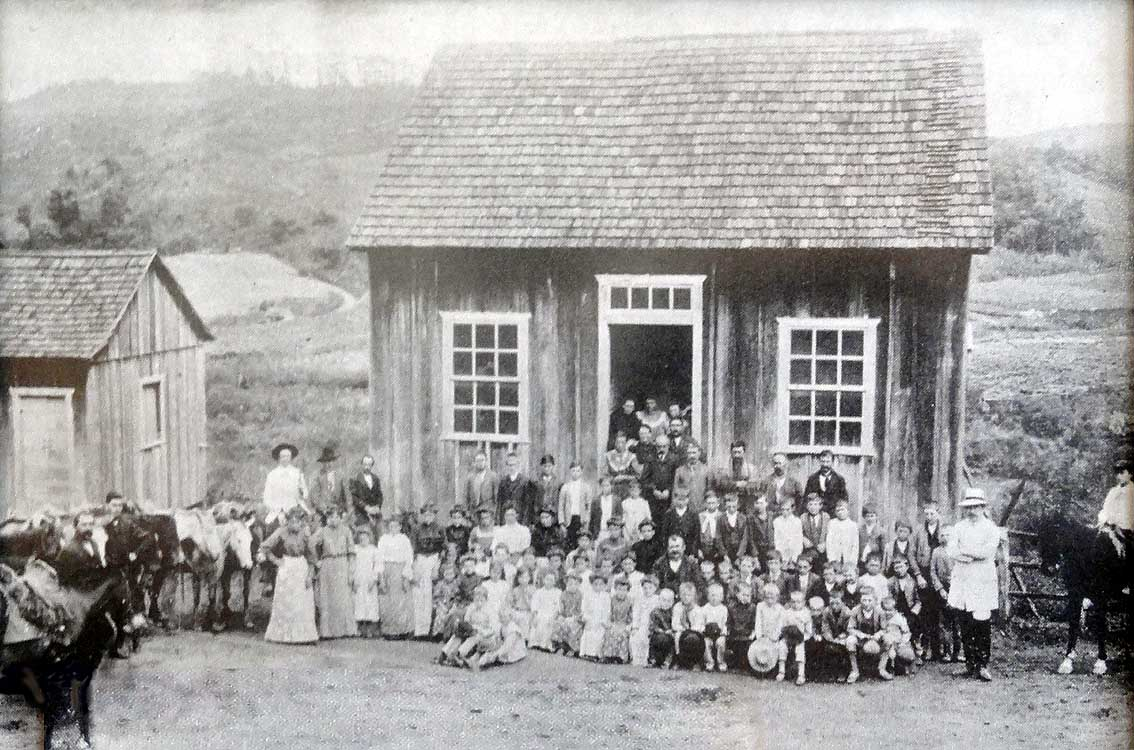
The first school

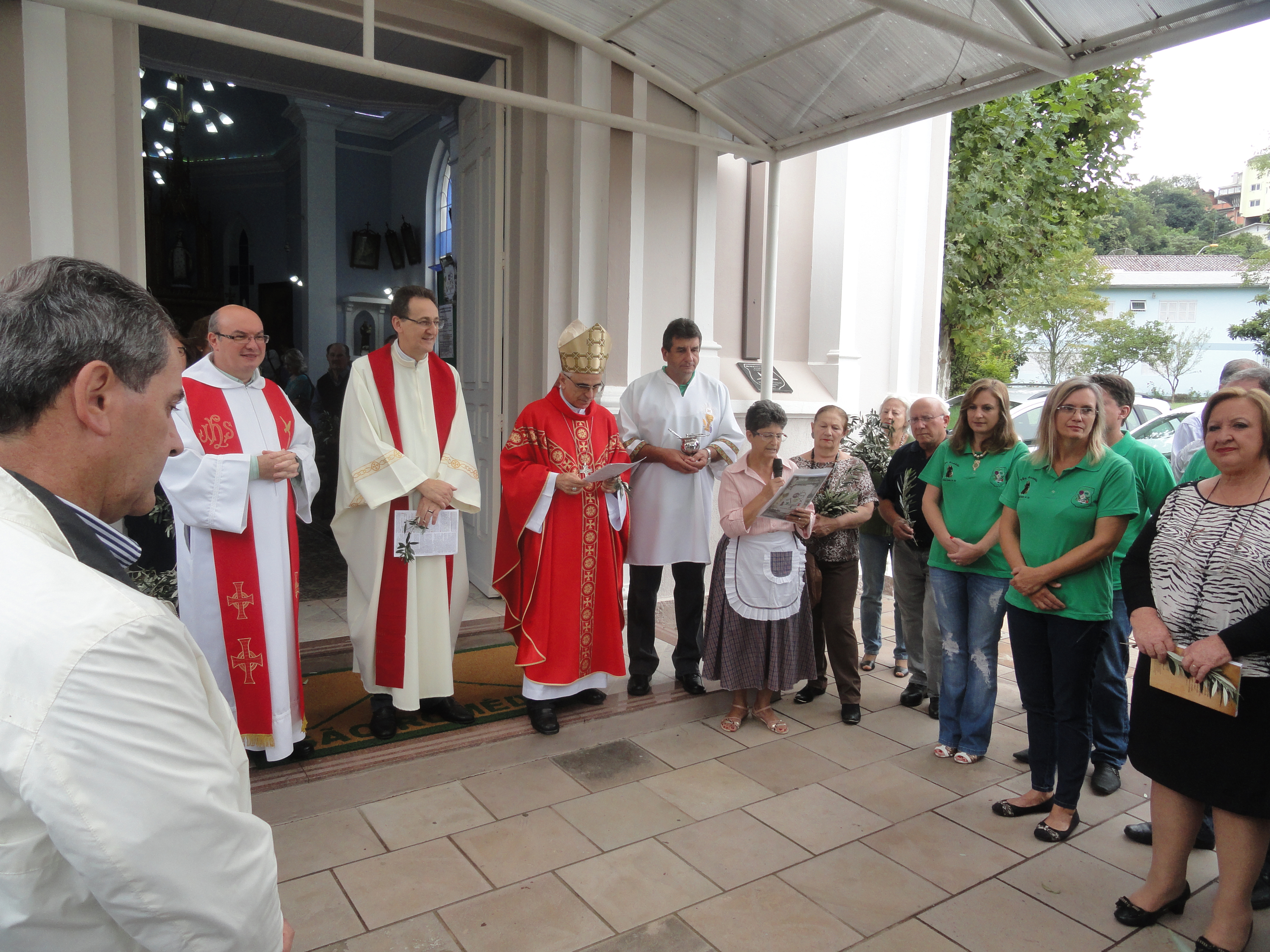
April 20, 2016: bishop Ruffinoni celebrates the 140 years foundation

== See also ==
- History of Caxias do Sul
