= Jacó Roberto Hilgert =

Brazilian bishop (1926–2020)

- Bishop of Cruz Alta
- Church: Catholic Church
- Diocese: Diocese of Cruz Alta
- In office: 19 July 1976 – 8 May 2002
- Predecessor: Nei Paulo Moretto
- Successor: Friedrich Heimler

Orders
- Ordination: 30 November 1952 by Alfredo Scherer
- Consecration: 26 September 1976 by Alfredo Scherer

Personal details
- Born: 27 January 1926 Harmonia, São Pedro do Rio Grande do Sul, Brazil
- Died: 17 December 2020 (aged 94) Cruz Alta, Rio Grande do Sul, Brazil

Jacó Roberto Hilgert (27 January 1926 – 17 December 2020) was a Brazilian Catholic bishop.

Hilgert was born in Brazil and was ordained to the priesthood in 1952. He served as bishop of the Diocese of Cruz Alta, Brazil, from 1976 to 2002.
