= Leistarcha tenuistria =

Scientific classification
- Domain: Eukaryota
- Kingdom: Animalia
- Phylum: Arthropoda
- Class: Insecta
- Order: Lepidoptera
- Family: Xyloryctidae
- Genus: Leistarcha
- Species: L. tenuistria

Binomial name
- Leistarcha tenuistria (Turner, 1935)

Synonyms
- Bathydoxa tenuistria Turner, 1935

Species of moth

Leistarcha tenuistria is a moth in the family Xyloryctidae. It was described by Alfred Jefferis Turner in 1935. It is found in Australia, where it has been recorded from New South Wales, Queensland and Victoria.

The wingspan is about 30 mm.
