= Nei Paulo Moretto =

Roman Catholic prelate (1936–2023)

His Excellency Nei Paulo Moretto
- Bishop Emertus of Caxias do Sul
- Archdiocese: Roman Catholic Archdiocese of Porto Alegre
- Appointed: 26 May 1983
- Term ended: 6 July 2011
- Predecessor: Benedito Zorzi
- Successor: Alessandro Carmelo Ruffinoni
- Previous posts: Bishop of Cruz Alta (1972–1976); Coadjutor bishop of Caxias do Sul and Titular Bishop of Thubursicum (1976–1983)

Orders
- Ordination: 16 November 1972 by Faustino M. Tissot
- Consecration: 28 January 1973 by Alfredo Scherer

Personal details
- Born: 25 May 1936 Caxias do Sul, Rio Grande do Sul, Brazil
- Died: 6 April 2023 (aged 86) Caxias do Sul, Rio Grande do Sul, Brazil
- Motto: OMNIA GRATIA (Everything is Grace)

Styles of Nei Paulo Moretto
- Reference style: His Excellency; The Most Reverend
- Spoken style: Your Excellency
- Religious style: Bishop

Nei Paulo Moretto (25 May 1936 – 6 April 2023) was a Brazilian Roman Catholic prelate. He served as bishop of Cruz Alta (1972–1976), coadjutor bishop (1976–1983) and bishop of Caxias do Sul (1983–2011).

== Early life and education ==
Moretto was born in Caxias do Sul on 25 May 1936, to Isidoro Domingos Moretto and Paulina Soldatelli, the eldest son of a family of 8 siblings. He did his primary studies at the Henrique Emílio Mayer School. In 1947 he went on to study at the Nossa Senhora Aparecida Seminary, in Caxias do Sul, where he remained until 1953, and later graduated in Philosophy and Theology at the Pontifical Gregorian University. On 2 July 1961 he received his priestly ordination from Bishop Faustino Tissot.

== Ministry ==
=== Priesthood ===
Back in Caxias do Sul, Moretto developed his activity at the Sagrada Familia Parish and shortly afterwards was appointed coadjutor at the parish of São Francisco de Paula. In 1963, he was assistant at the Nossa Senhora Aparecida Seminary in Caxias do Sul and from 1964 to 1965 rector of the same seminary. From 1966 to 1972, Moretto was Professor of Philosophy and Theology at the Major Seminary in Viamão. Between 1967 and 1968, he was assistant to the major seminarians of the Dioceses of Caxias do Sul and Frederico Westphalen. In 1969, he was appointed vice-rector and later rector of the seminary from 1970 until his episcopal appointment in 1972.

=== Bishop ===
On 16 November 1972, Moretto was appointed by Pope Paul VI as bishop of the Diocese of Cruz Alta, being consecrated by Dom Umberto Mozzoni on 28 January 1973. He adopted his motto Omnia Gratia (Everything is Grace). On 21 January 1976, he was transferred to the Diocese of Caxias do Sul as coadjutor with the right to succession, taking office on 19 March 1976. On 26 May 1983, during the pilgrimage of Nossa Senhora de Caravaggio, Moretto was appointed bishop of Caxias do Sul, succeeding Dom Benedito Zorzi, a role he would hold for 28 years.

Moretto was vice-president of the Board of Directors of the University of Caxias do Sul Foundation, president of CNBB Regional Sul III for two terms, and vice-president for one term. He introduced the cause of beatification of Father João Schiavo, which was confirmed in 2017.

== Retirement and death ==
On 2 July 2011, Moretto celebrated his 50 years of presbyterial ordination, at the Diocesan Cathedral of Caxias do Sul, his last solemn mass as diocesan bishop. Four days later, Pope Benedict XVI accepted his resignation due to age limit, and since then he had been Bishop Emeritus of Caxias do Sul. He received the title of Citizen Emeritus of Caxias do Sul in 2011. Moretto died on 6 April 2023, at the age of 86.

Catholic Church titles
Preceded by Benedito Zorzi	Bishop of Caxias do Sul; 1983–2011	Succeeded by Alessandro Carmelo Ruffinoni
Preceded by Ferdinando Longinotti	Titular Bishop of Thubursicum; 1976–1983	Succeeded by José Alves da Costa
Preceded by Walmor Battú Wichrowski	Bishop of Cruz Alta; 1972–1976	Succeeded by Jacó Roberto Hilgert
