= Archdiocese of Passo Fundo =

Catholic ecclesiastical territory

Coordinates: 28.2629°S 52.4076°W

Archdiocese of Passo Fundo Archidioecesis Passofundensis

Catholic
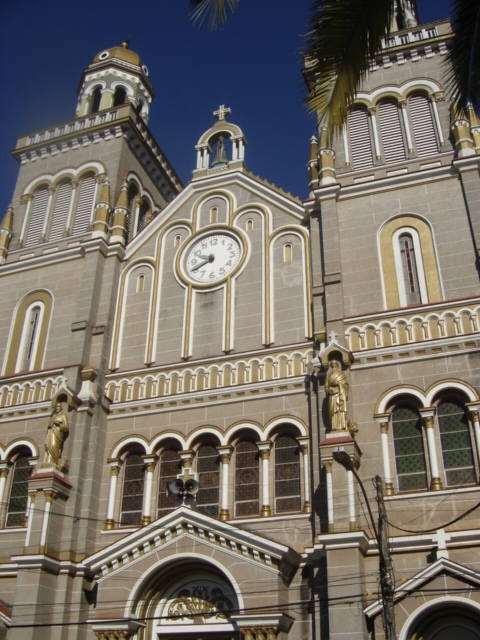
- Cathedral of Our Lady of Aparecida

- Coat of arms

Location
- Country: Brazil
- Ecclesiastical province: Passo Fundo

Statistics
- Area: 12,200 km^{2} (4,700 sq mi)
- Population: Total; Catholics: (as of 2004); 488,530; 366,397 (75.0%)

Information
- Rite: Latin Rite
- Established: 10 March 1951 (75 years ago)
- Cathedral: Cathedral of Our Lady of Aparecida

Current leadership
- Pope: Leo XIV
- Archbishop: Rodolfo Luís Weber
- Bishops emeritus: Antônio Carlos Altieri, S.D.B.

Website
- www.pastoral.com.br

The Roman Catholic Archdiocese of Passo Fundo (Latin: Archidioecesis Passofundensis) is an archdiocese located in the city of Passo Fundo. Before being elevated to an archdiocese itself in 2011 it was part of the ecclesiastical province of Porto Alegre in Brazil.

== History ==
- March 10, 1951: Established as Diocese of Passo Fundo from the Diocese of Santa Maria
- April 13, 2011: Elevated to archdiocese

== Bishops ==
=== Ordinaries, in reverse chronological order ===
- Archbishops of Passo Fundo (Roman rite), below
  - Archbishop Rodolfo Luís Weber (2015.12.2 - Present)
  - Archbishop Antonio Carlos Altieri (2012.07.11 - 2015.12.2); formerly, Bishop of Caraguatatuba
  - Archbishop Pedro Ercílio Simon (see below 2011.04.13 – 2012.07.11)
- Bishops of Passo Fundo (Roman rite), below
  - Bishop Pedro Ercílio Simon (1999.05.19 – 2011.04.13 see above)
  - Bishop Urbano José Allgayer (1982.02.04 – 1999.05.19)
  - Bishop João Cláudio Colling (1951.03.23 – 1981.08.29), appointed Archbishop of Porto Alegre

=== Coadjutor bishop ===
- Pedro Ercílio Simon (1998-1999)

=== Auxiliary bishop ===
- Liro Vendelino Meurer (2009-2013), appointed Bishop of Santo Ângelo, Rio Grande do Sul

=== Other priest of this diocese who became bishop ===
- Osvino José Both, appointed Auxiliary Bishop of Porto Alegre, Rio Grande do Sul in 1990

== Suffragan Sees ==
- Diocese of Erexim
- Diocese of Frederico Westphalen
- Diocese of Vacaria
