= Alessandro Carmelo Ruffinoni =

Italian bishop

Alessandro Carmelo Ruffinoni C.S.
- Bishop Emeritus of Caxias do Sul
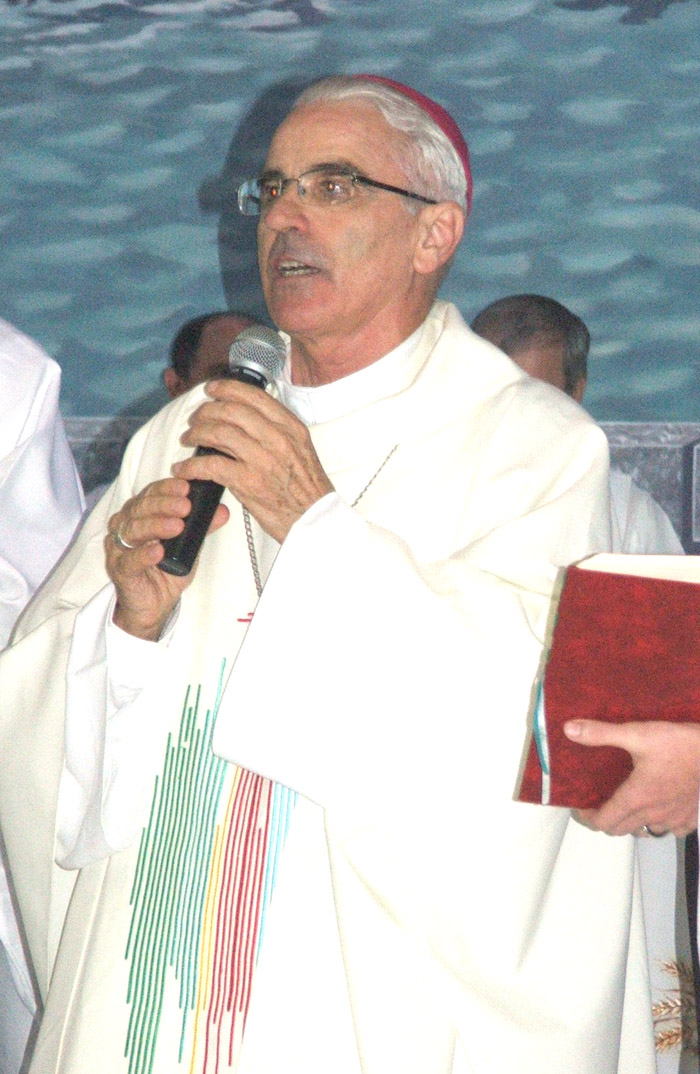
- Church: Roman Catholic Church
- See: Roman Catholic Diocese of Caxias do Sul
- In office: 2011–2019
- Predecessor: Nei Paulo Moretto
- Successor: Jose Gilson, O.F.M. Cap.

Orders
- Ordination: March 8, 1970
- Consecration: March 17, 2006 by Archbishop Dadeus Grings

Personal details
- Born: August 26, 1943 (age 83) Piazza Brembana, Italy
- Denomination: Roman Catholic Church
- Occupation: Bishop
- Profession: priest
- Motto: Na Igreja ninguém é estrangeiro In the Church nobody is stranger
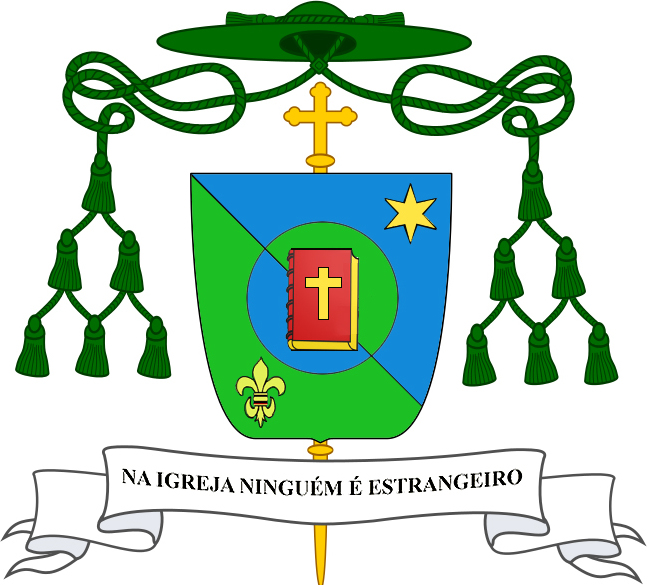
- Coat of arms: Alessandro Carmelo Ruffinoni C.S.'s coat of arms

Styles of Alessandro Carmelo Ruffinoni
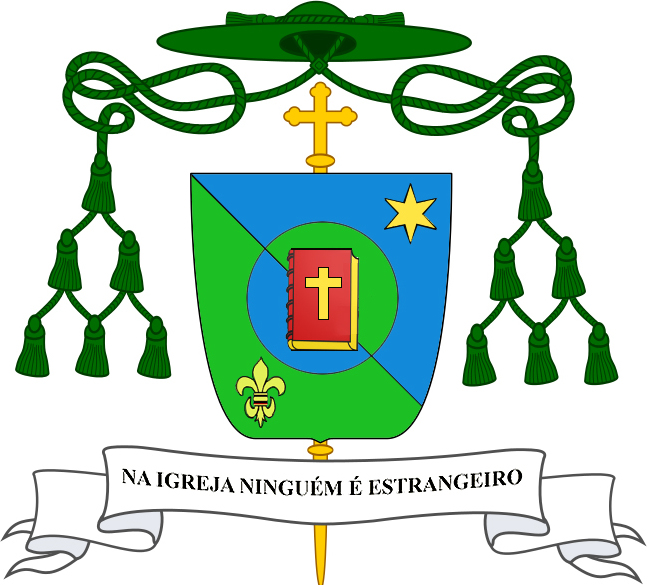
- Reference style: The Most Reverend
- Spoken style: Your Excellency
- Religious style: Monsignor
- Posthumous style: none

Alessandro Carmelo Ruffinoni is the retired bishop of Caxias do Sul and a Scalabrinian priest.

== Biography ==
Born in Piazza Brembana in 1943, fourth of five children, he completed his studies between Rezzato and Cermenate. He entered the Scalabrinian Congregation in 1961, to be ordained priest on 8 March 1970. He left Italy for Brazil as a missionary in following November.

From 1988 to 1998 he was director of the Centro Missionero P. Luigi Valtulini in Ciudad del Este, Paraguay; and from 1999 to 2004 he was provincial superior in Brazil.

Elected titular bishop of Furnos Maior in 2006, he was ordained as auxiliary bishop of Porto Alegre on 17 March 2006, and moved to Caxias do Sul as coadjutor bishop on 16 June 2010.

He succeeded the see on 6 July 2011, and remained in office until 26 June 2019 when Pope Francis accepted his resignation.

== Gallery ==
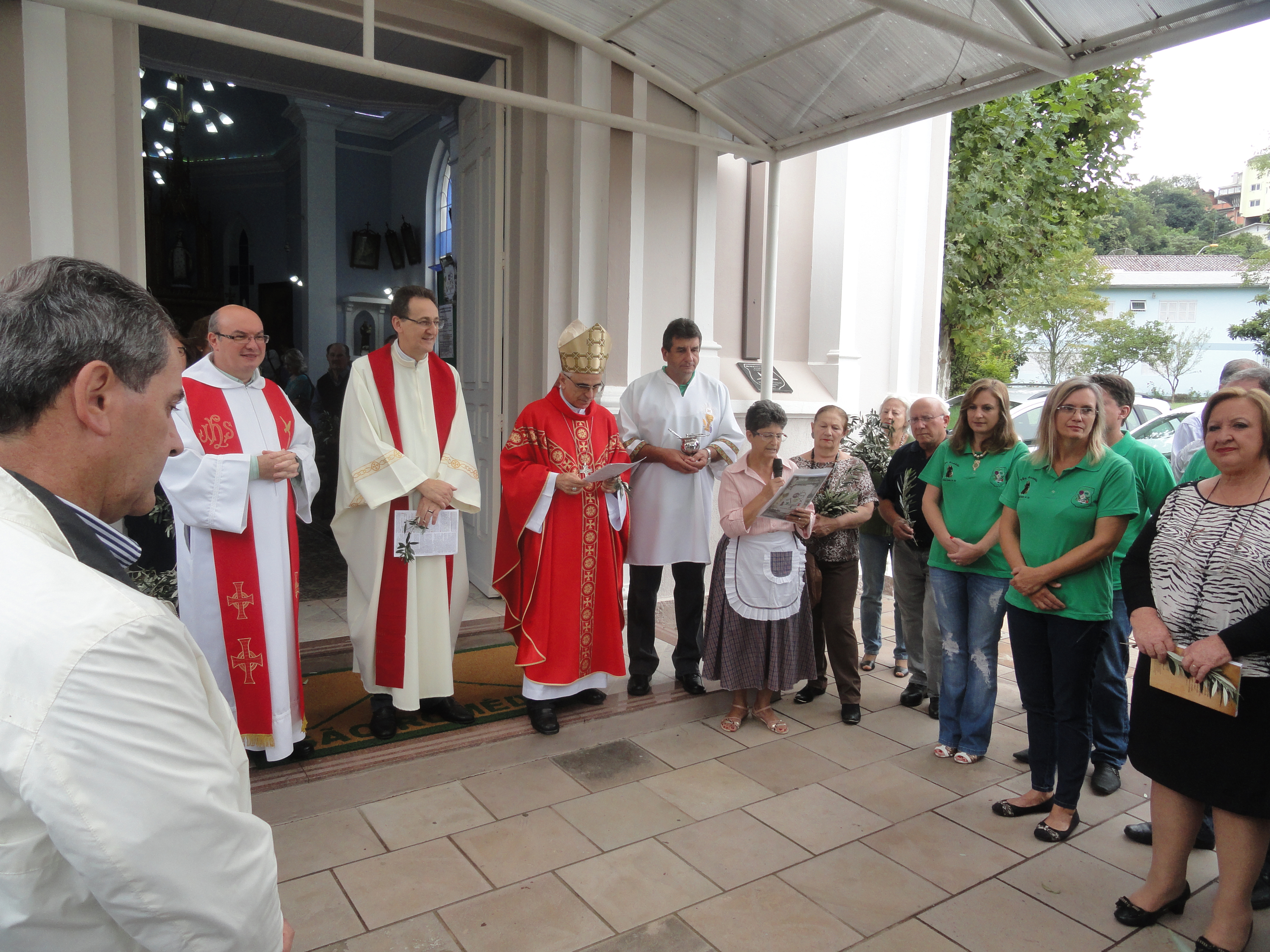
Bishop Ruffinoni celebrates the 140th year foundation of São Romédio Community, 20 April 2016.

== Honours and awards ==
Medalha do Mérito Farroupilha, 2008

Catholic Church titles
Preceded by Jorge Eduardo Lozano	Titular Bishop of Furnos Maior; 2006–2010	Succeeded by Agenor Girardi M.S.C.
Catholic Church titles
Preceded by Nei Paulo Moretto	Bishop of Caxias do Sul; 2011–2019	Succeeded by Jose Gilson O.F.M. Cap.
