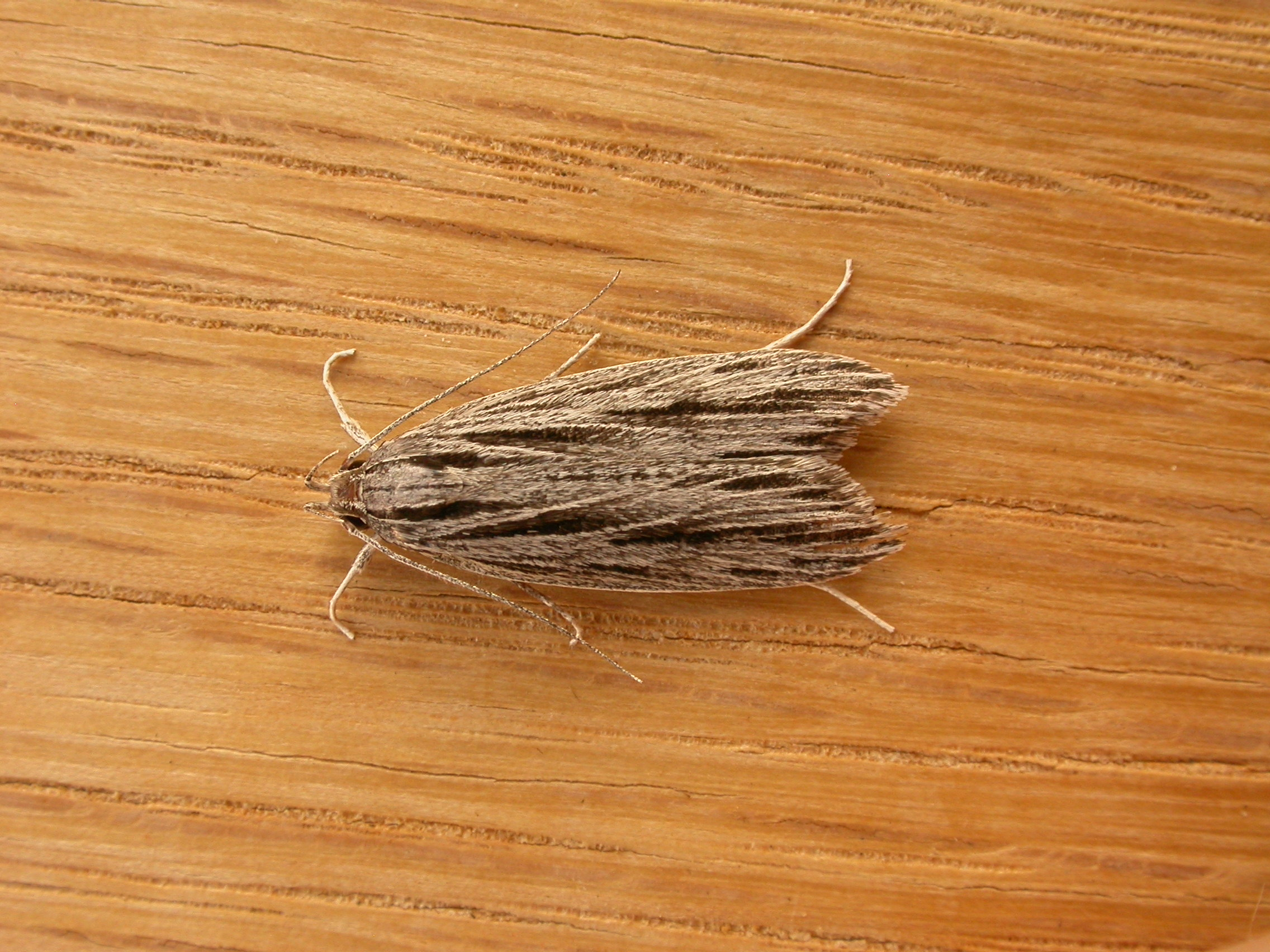
- Leistarcha

Scientific classification
- Domain: Eukaryota
- Kingdom: Animalia
- Phylum: Arthropoda
- Class: Insecta
- Order: Lepidoptera
- Family: Xyloryctidae
- Genus: Leistarcha; Meyrick, 1883

Synonyms
- Leistarcha Meyrick, 1883; Tigava Walker, 1864

= Leistarcha =

Moth genus in family Xyloryctidae

Leistarcha is a genus of moths of the family Xyloryctidae.

== Species ==
- Leistarcha amphigramma (Meyrick, 1915)
- Leistarcha scitissimella (Walker, 1864)
- Leistarcha tenuistria (Turner, 1935)
- Leistarcha thaumastica (Turner, 1946)
