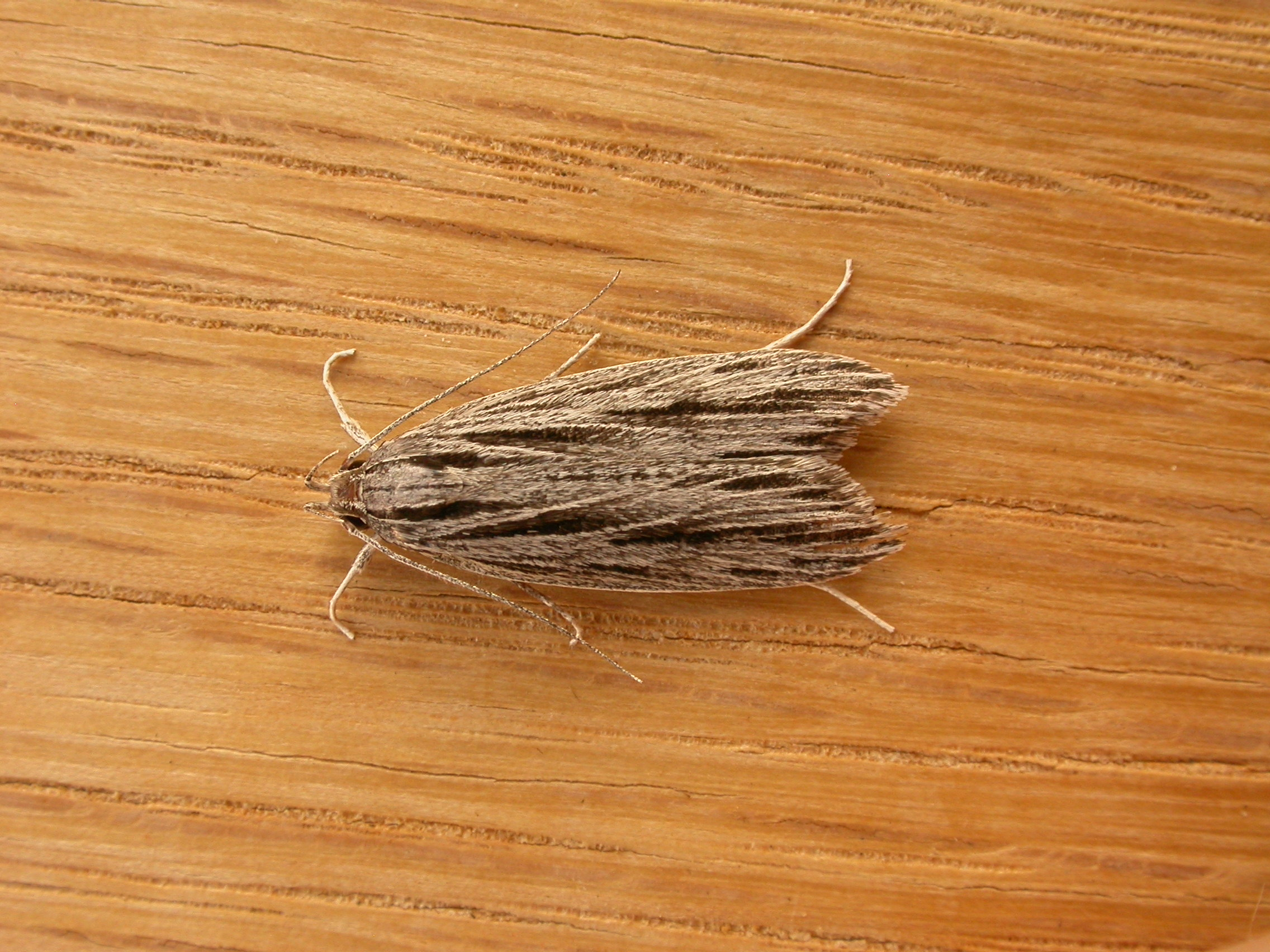

Scientific classification
- Kingdom: Animalia
- Phylum: Arthropoda
- Class: Insecta
- Order: Lepidoptera
- Family: Xyloryctidae
- Genus: Leistarcha
- Species: L. scitissimella

Binomial name
- Leistarcha scitissimella (Walker, 1864)

Synonyms
- Tigava scitissimella Walker, 1864; Leistarcha iobola Meyrick, 1883

= Leistarcha scitissimella =

Species of moth

Leistarcha scitissimella is a moth of the family Xyloryctidae. It is found in Australia, where it has been recorded from the Australian Capital Territory, New South Wales and Queensland.

The wingspan is about 31 mm. The forewings are dark fuscous, very closely strewn with very elongate whitish scales. All veins and extreme the costal margin are slenderly whitish and there is a clear dark fuscous streak above the cell from the base to before the middle, then obscurely continued between the veins to the costa before the apex. There is a dark fuscous-streak beneath the cell almost from the base to the middle and a sharply defined dark fuscous streak from the middle of the disc to the hindmargin beneath the apex. There is also a slender dark fuscous streak along the inner margin from near the base to the middle of the hindmargin, broader on the anal angle and then attenuated, sharply interrupted by the veins. The hindwings are fuscous-grey, rather lighter towards the base.

The larvae feed on Eucalyptus amygdalina beneath loose bark attaching cut leaves to entrance. They are greyish-fuscous, anteriorly lighter and more greenish.
