= São Valentim =

Municipality of Rio Grande do Sul, Brazil

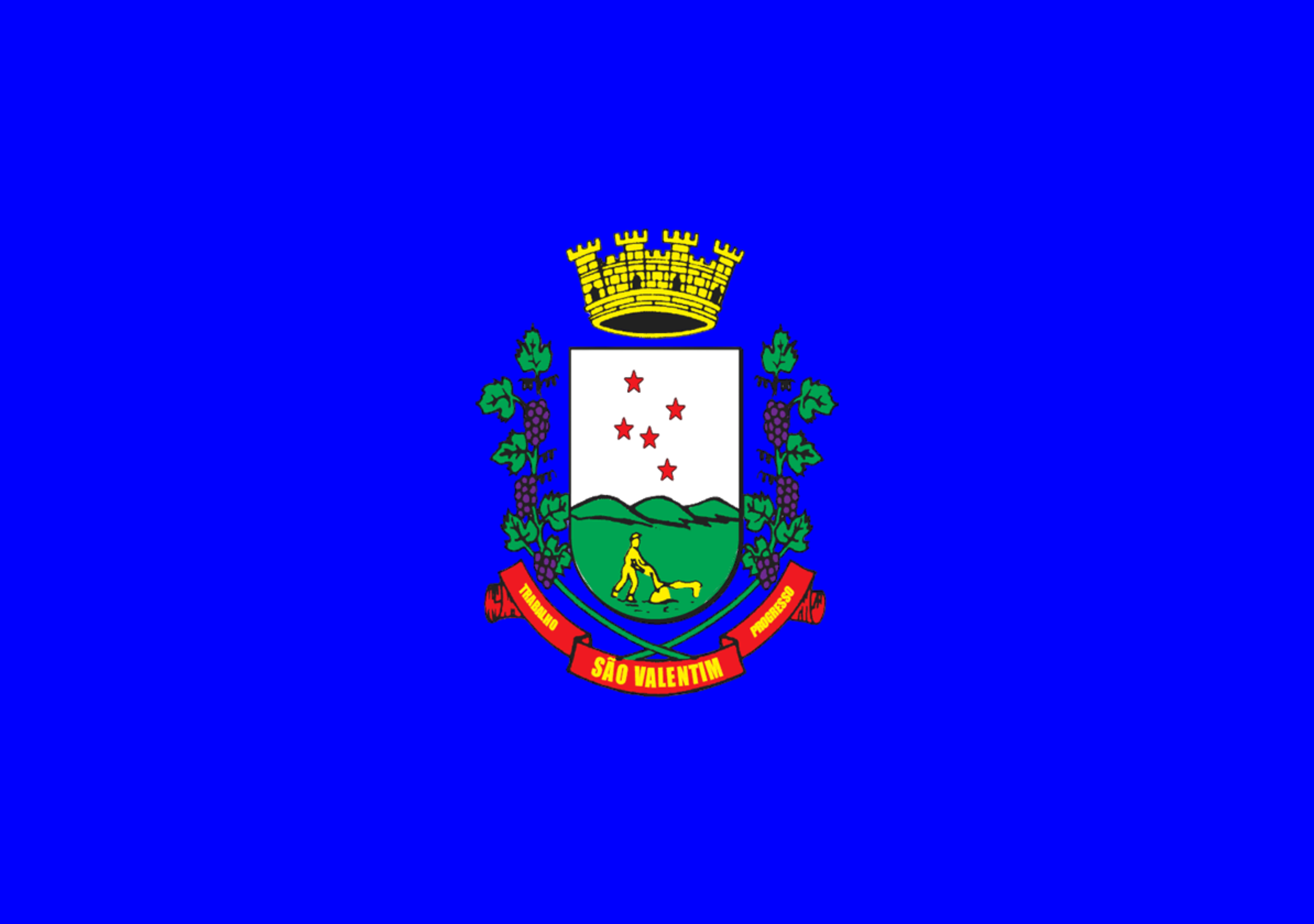
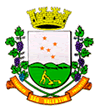
- Flag Coat of arms

- Location within Brazil
- Coordinates: 27°33′28″S 52°31′26″W
- Country: Brazil
- State: Rio Grande do Sul
- Mesoregion: Noroeste Rio-Grandense
- Microregion: Erechim

Government
  - Mayor: Antonio Jose Zanandrea

Area
  - Total: 154.19 km^{2} (59.53 sq mi)

Population (2020)
  - Total: 3,259
  - Density: 21.14/km^{2} (54.74/sq mi)

São Valentim is a municipality in the state of Rio Grande do Sul, Brazil.

== See also ==
- List of municipalities in Rio Grande do Sul
