= Urbano José Allgayer =

Brazilian Roman Catholic bishop (1924–2019)

- Bishop of the Archdiocese of Passo Fundo
- Church: Roman Catholic Church
- See: Roman Catholic Archdiocese of Passo Fundo
- In office: 1982–1999
- Predecessor: João Cláudio Colling
- Successor: Pedro Ercílio Simon
- Previous post(s): Prelate

Orders
- Ordination: December 10, 1950

Personal details
- Born: March 16, 1924; Santa Clara, Brazil
- Died: May 14, 2019 (aged 95)

Urbano José Allgayer (March 16, 1924 – May 14, 2019) was a Brazilian prelate of the Catholic Church.

== Biography ==
Allgayer was born in Santa Clara, Brazil and was ordained a priest on December 10, 1950. Allgayer was appointed auxiliary bishop of the Archdiocese of Porto Alegre, as well as Titular Bishop of Tunnuna, on February 5, 1974, and was consecrated on March 24, 1974. Allgayer was appointed bishop of the Archdiocese of Passo Fundo on February 4, 1982. Allgayer retired from the diocese on May 19, 1999. He died on May 14, 2019.
