= Leomar Antônio Brustolin =

Brazilian Catholic archbishop (born 1967)

His Excellency Leomar Antônio Brustolin
- Archbishop of Santa Maria
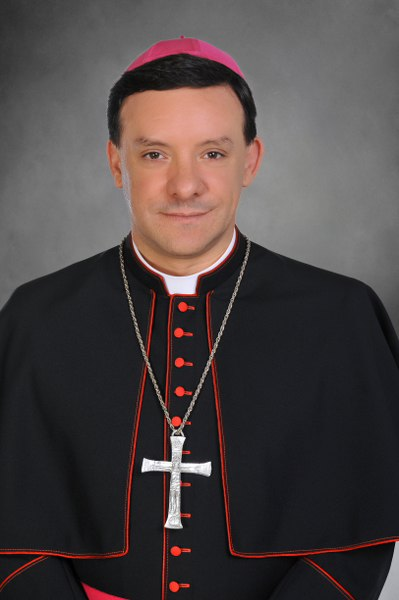
- Church: Roman Catholic Church
- Archdiocese: Santa Maria
- In office: June 2, 2021
- Predecessor: Hélio Adelar Rubert
- Previous posts: Vicar in St Tereza church in Caxias do Sul; Rector of Regional pontifical Seminary of Auxiliary-bishop of Porto Alegre

Orders
- Ordination: December 20, 1992
- Consecration: March 25, 2015 by Jaime Spengler

Personal details
- Born: August 15, 1967 (age 59) Caxias do Sul
- Education: Pontifical Faculty of Theology of Sardinia; Patristic Institute Augustinianum; Institut Catholique de Paris
- Motto: In Verbo Tuo
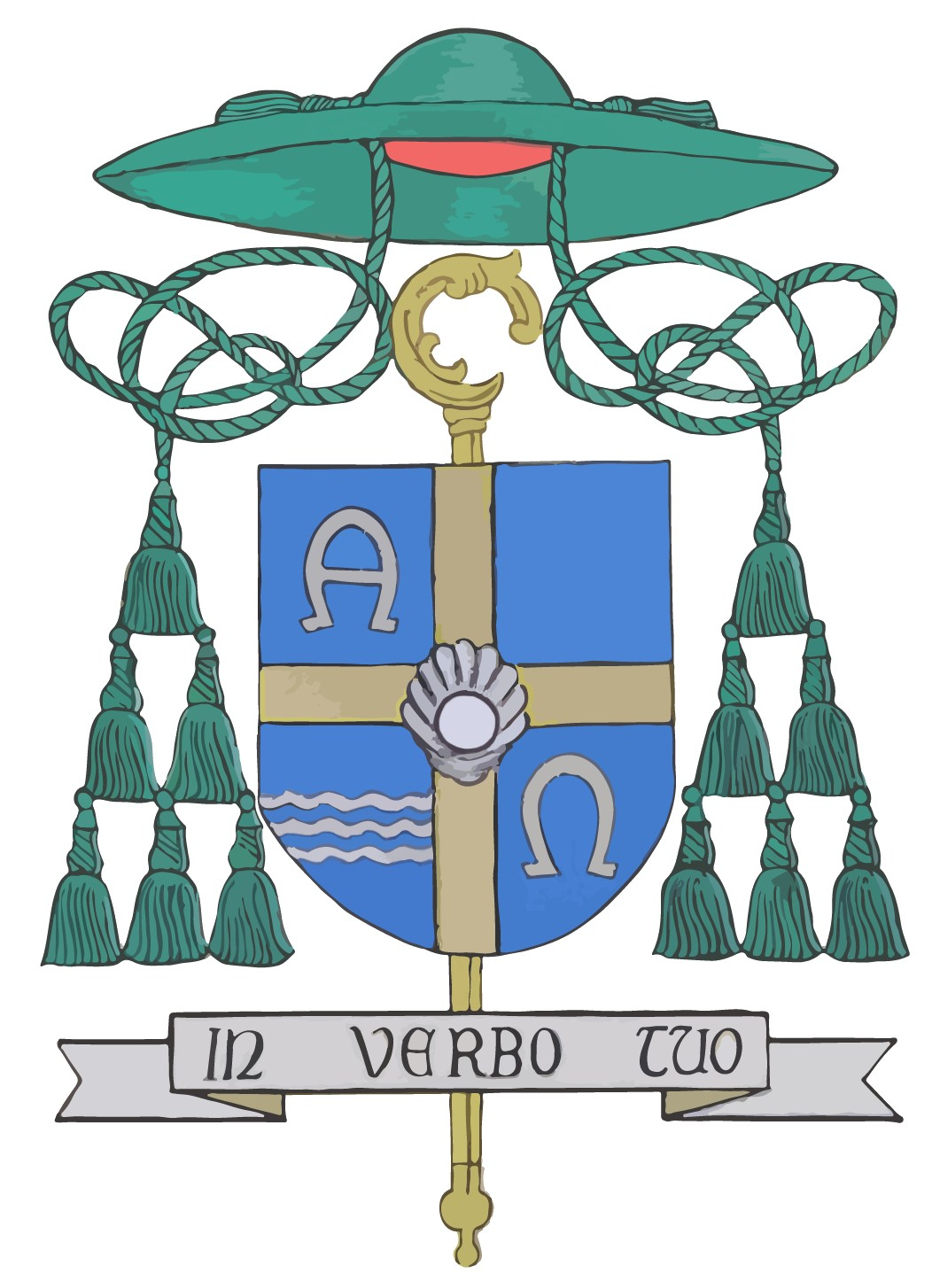
- Coat of arms

Styles of Leomar Antônio Brustolin
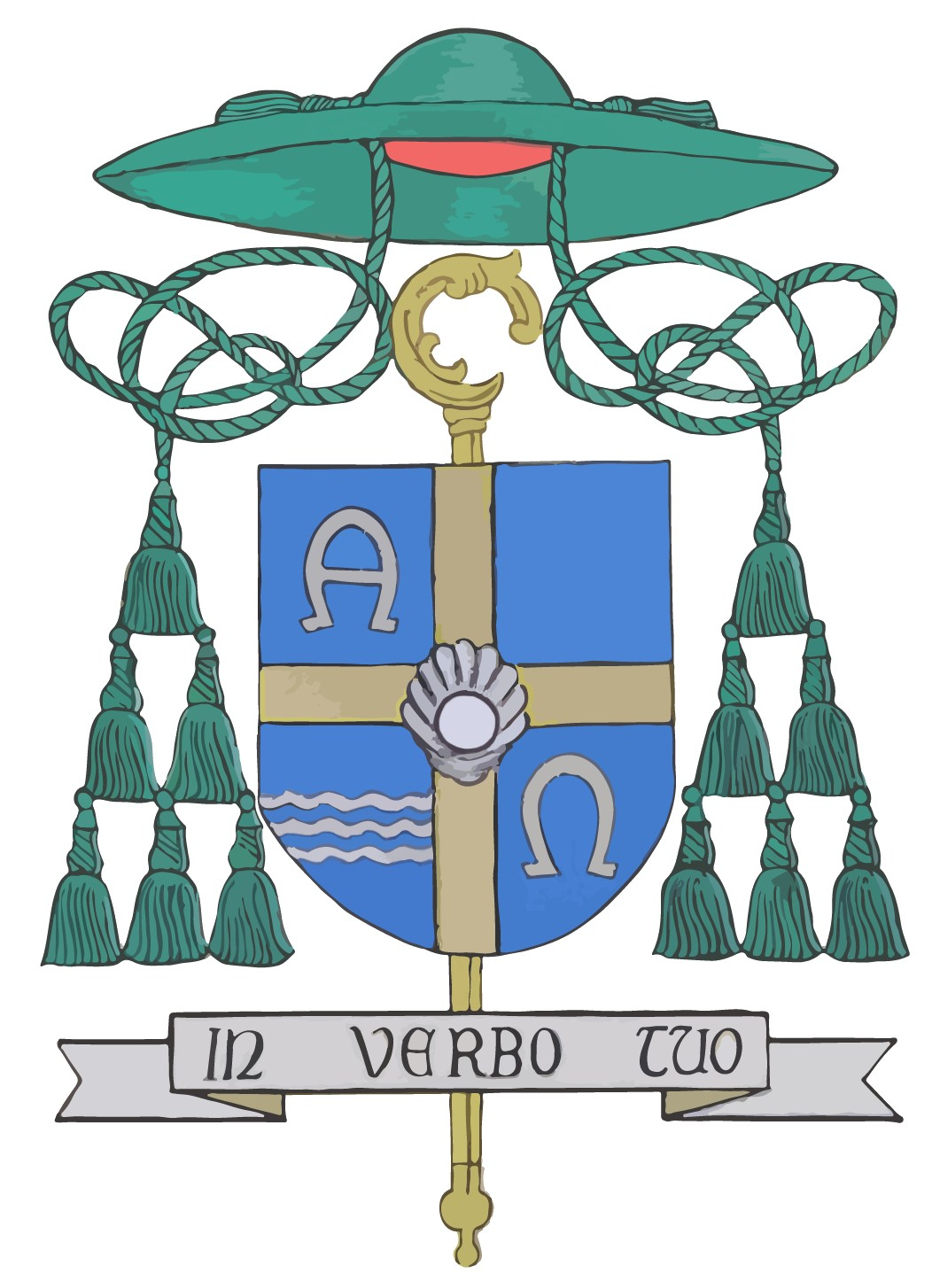
- Reference style: The Most Reverend
- Spoken style: Your Excellency
- Religious style: Monsignor

Leomar Antônio Brustolin (born 15 August 1967) is a Brazilian prelate of the Catholic Church who has been archbishop of Santa Maria since 2021. He was auxiliary bishop of Porto Alegre from 2015 to 2021.

== Biography ==
Leomar Antônio Brustolin was born in Caxias do Sul on 15 August 1967. He studied at the University of Caxias do Sul and at the Pontifical Catholic University of Rio Grande do Sul. He was ordained a priest on 20 December 1992. From 1992 to 2001 he was parish vicar of Saint Teresa, at the diocesan cathedral of Caxias do Sul. From 1993 to 2014, he was director of the theology course for the laity of the dioceses of Caxias do Sur.

On 7 January 2015, Pope Francis appointed him auxiliary bishop of the Archdiocese of Porto Alegre and titular bishop of Tigava. He was ordained a bishop on 25 March by Archbishop Jaime Spengler. On 22 June, he was appointed a member of the Episcopal Pastoral Commission for the Doctrine of the Faith of the Episcopal Conference of Brazil (C.N.B.B.).

On 2 June 2021, Pope Francis appointed him archbishop of Santa Maria. He was installed there on 15 August, his birthday, at the Basilica Shrine of Our Lady Mediatrix of All Graces.

Catholic Church titles
Preceded by -	Titular Bishop of Tigava; 2015–2021	Succeeded by -
Preceded by Hélio Adelar Rubert	Archbishop of Santa Maria; 2021–present	Incumbent
