= Saint Anne Chapel (Sabará) =

18th-century chapel in Sabará, Brazil

- Capela de Sant'Ana
- Main façade of the chapel, August 2026

Religion
- Affiliation: Catholic Church
- Ecclesiastical or organisational status: Chapel

Location
- Location: Arraial Velho, Sabará, Minas Gerais
- Country: Brazil
- Interactive map of Saint Anne Chapel
- Coordinates: 19.916439°S 43.821332°W

Architecture
- Materials: Canga stone masonry

Saint Anne Chapel (Portuguese: Capela de Sant'Ana), also known as the Igreja de Sant'Ana or Capela de Santana, is an 18th-century Catholic chapel in Arraial Velho, a neighbourhood of Sabará in the Brazilian state of Minas Gerais. Its walls are built of canga, an iron ore, and are left bare inside the nave; the chancel holds a single carved and gilded retable in the Dom João V (Joanine) style.

The date of its construction is uncertain. The historian Diogo de Vasconcelos saw the year 1747 carved on its doorway in 1898, which has often been taken as the probable date of completion, though more recent research suggests that the chapel was built between 1750 and 1770 and was in use by 1757. It is considered the first building in the Sabará area in which stone masonry replaced construction in earth and timber. The nave was in ruins by the end of the 19th century, and the façade, roof and nave walls were rebuilt in the mid-20th century. The IPHAN listed the chapel as national heritage on 9 May 1950, and the municipality of Sabará gave it local protection in 2002. It is owned by the Irmandade de Nossa Senhora do Carmo.

== History ==
=== Background ===
Arraial Velho, today a neighbourhood of Sabará, is among the oldest settled places in the region. It is claimed to have been very rich in gold, and the explorer Manuel de Borba Gato is said to have lived there for a short time. The area at first belonged to Raposos. In 1711 the settlement's chapel, dedicated to Santo Antônio da Mouraria, was made a parish church (matriz); in 1736 it lost that rank and became a subsidiary chapel of the parish of Nossa Senhora da Conceição of Raposos. Both that chapel and Saint Anne belonged to the parish of Raposos for a long period.

=== Construction ===
No documents on the chapel's founding or construction have been located, and its builder is unknown, though it has long been presumed to have been built about the middle of the 18th century. One reason is its material: the region's religious buildings of the first decades of that century were of earth (taipa) and timber, and stone masonry was not commonly used in them. When the historian Diogo de Vasconcelos visited the chapel in 1898, he recorded the year 1747 carved on the doorway. Several sources take this year as the probable date of completion, supported by the year 1759 on the surviving bell.

Assuming a date of 1747, Affonso Ávila described the chapel as the only church in Sabará that survives from the years 1730 to 1755, a period in which almost no religious buildings were undertaken locally, and treated it as marking a second phase in the development of Sabará's religious architecture. It was the first building in the Sabará area in which stone masonry—here of canga, a spongy iron ore—took the place of the older structure of earth and timber. Sylvio de Vasconcellos supposed that the chapel was a stone rebuilding of an earlier structure of timber and clay.

Other research suggests that the chapel was built possibly between 1750 and 1770. The 1747 inscription no longer exists and may have been lost together with the cornice of the doorway when the building fell into ruin. A licence (provisão) of 26 February 1751 for building a chapel of Santana at Roça Grande, granted at the request of the mestre de campo Jacinto Vieira da Costa, is thought to refer to this chapel, although the document itself has not been found. Because of its proximity, the chapel may then have belonged to the parish of Santo Antônio da Roça Grande, which between 1744 and 1759 was being reduced to a curate chapel; that process could explain why the chapel passed to the parish of Raposos soon after the licence was granted.

The earliest known archival mention of the chapel dates to 10 August 1755. On that day André Vaz de Almeida, described in the Raposos baptismal register for 1736–1760 as chaplain of the portable altar of Santa Anna in the settlement, baptised a child in the neighbouring chapel of Santo Antônio da Mouraria. This record bears out the view that the chapel began as a portable oratory or temporary chapel used until the permanent building was finished. The first baptism in the chapel itself is dated 21 February 1757, and many others followed there until the register closes in 1760, indicating that by 1757 the building was in use and, if not complete, already being decorated. That first baptism was of an enslaved adult, Alexandre, who belonged to a freed Black woman, reflecting the diversity among the devotees of Saint Anne in Minas Gerais.

In a petition of 1764 held in the Arquivo Histórico Ultramarino, the residents of Arraial Velho asked for leave to collect alms so as to finish the chapel, decorate its altars and supply it with vestments. As was common in 18th-century churches, the interior decoration was paid for with alms and gifts; one donor was Luiza Pereira do Lago, a freed Black woman of the parish of Raposos and a member of the Irmandade de Nossa Senhora do Rosário dos Pretos, who contributed to the main altar and to a side altar dedicated to Saint Michael.

=== Decline ===
On 25 August 1808, Manuel Ferreira da Silva was appointed caretaker (zelador) of Saint Anne and of the Mouraria chapel, with the duty of keeping their furnishings and vestments clean and in order and of carrying out any repairs needed. During the pastoral visitation of 1822, the then bishop of Mariana, Dom Frei José da Santíssima Trindade, recorded finding both chapels in decent condition. The two chapels seem to have fallen into ruin some time later, and in 1857 the residents of Arraial Velho asked the Provincial Assembly for funds to repair Saint Anne, which was then close to collapse. When Vasconcelos saw the chapel in 1898 only the chancel still had a roof, and it remained in the same state of decay in 1942.

A schematic survey of the building made by SPHAN, the federal heritage service, on 25 August 1944 shows it in ruins and the churchyard wall partly collapsed. The survey also records an adobe wall where the nave balustrade now stands, a bell-gable made in the side wall of the nave, where the chapel's bell then hung, and a stone flight of steps that suggests access to a choir that may once have existed. The adobe wall and the bell-gable indicate that local people had altered the building in order to keep up services and to protect part of the contents of the chancel and sacristy.

=== Reconstruction and protection ===
In the mid-20th century, SPHAN rebuilt the collapsed façade, roof and nave walls, leaving the inner faces of the nave walls without render so that the canga masonry remained visible. This restoration is variously dated to the 1940s or to 1950, the year of the chapel's federal listing. Because the nave was already in ruins at Vasconcelos's visit and again when the building was partly reconstructed almost fifty years later, nothing is known of how the nave was originally decorated.

The chapel was listed under process 408-T-49 and entered in the Livro do Tombo de Belas Artes (Fine Arts Register) as inscription no. 365, in volume 1 at folio 73, on 9 May 1950. Under a resolution of SPHAN's advisory council of 13 August 1985, relating to administrative process 13/85/SPHAN, the listing includes all of the chapel's contents. The municipality of Sabará listed the chapel by Decree no. 273 of 10 April 2002.

=== Ownership and condition ===
The chapel is the property of the Irmandade de Nossa Senhora do Carmo and is still used for Catholic worship. An inspection in 2003 found the building in poor condition, with walls cracked by subsidence of the floor. Steel tie rods brace the side walls of the nave, and a further tie rod is fitted at the chancel arch to stabilise cracks.

== Architecture ==
=== Setting ===
The chapel stands in the Arraial Velho neighbourhood beside Rua Paracatu, to the right of the Rio das Velhas. The building is aligned north-east to south-west, parallel to the street and to the river. A low canga wall, incorporating dressed stones from the old Estrada Real, encloses its grassed churchyard, which is entered at the front over a cattle grid; two metal plaques with historical information are set into the ground at the entrance.

The chapel has no towers. Its bell hangs in a wooden belfry with a roof of ceramic tiles, on the right side of the churchyard. The bell was cast in Sabará and is dated 1759, and its inscription names João Antônio as its maker, in Vila Real do Sabará. Vasconcelos had reported the year 1751 on a large bell; as that date does not appear on the surviving bell, there may have been a second bell, since lost, or the year may have been misprinted in his book.

=== Exterior ===
The plan consists of two rectangular sections of different sizes, the larger holding the nave and the smaller the chancel; the sacristy projects from the side of the chancel as a lower and narrower room. This arrangement resembles that of the chapel of Bom Jesus das Flores in Ouro Preto, dated to 1748. The stone walls carry a two-slope roof of curved tiles, with eaves finished in a mortar cornice. On the outside the walls are whitewashed, and the base, the quoins and the eaves are painted ochre.

The front is plain, with quoins of stone masonry at its corners; it rises to a triangular pediment, and a wooden cross stands on the ridge of the roof. Beneath the apex of the gable is a small rose-shaped oculus. Lower down, segmental arches with dressed-stone surrounds frame the two windows at choir level and the panelled, blue-painted two-leaf main door. The doorway has straight jambs and a cornice above the arch, topped by a simple dressed-stone ornamental panel with volutes and a stylised shell. Among the rural chapels of the Sabará area, the oculus is a rare case of such an opening having a decorative role, an ornamental intention that extends to the stone surrounds of the openings and to the volutes and shell over the door. A metal plaque beside the doorway identifies the chapel as a property listed by IPHAN.

=== Interior ===
In the nave, the bare canga walls—the only example of their kind in Sabará—give the interior an austere and solemn air of age, while the roof tiles and their light-blue-painted timber framing are left open to view. On the Gospel side, to the left as one enters, the dressed-stone baptismal font stands on a raised floor, with a small cupboard for the holy oils in the wall behind it. The rest of the nave has a boarded floor on two levels, with a turned wooden balustrade marking the step up to the higher one. Each side wall has a door and a window; there are also two stone holy-water stoups and, on the Gospel side, the stone base of a pulpit. The pulpit is generally regarded as unfinished, though it remains uncertain whether it was never completed or was later removed. The chancel arch is of plain dressed stone.

Unlike the nave, the chancel has rendered and whitewashed walls and a three-faceted boarded ceiling painted light blue, neither with any artistic decoration; its floor is on two levels joined by stone steps. The sacristy, reached from the chancel and also by an outside door, has a stone lavabo, a built-in cupboard, a wooden vestment chest (arcaz) and a ceiling of matting. It also holds an old oratory, which contains an image of Saint Anne as teacher (Sant'Ana Mestra) and has naive paintings inside.

=== Retable and sculpture ===
The chancel holds the chapel's only retable, carved in the developed form of the Dom João V style. Its paintwork has been described either as predominantly light in tone with gilding on the decorative highlights, or as red, blue and gold, and its style has been likened to that of the altarpiece of the Church of Our Lady of Ó. Because so little was built in the Sabará area between 1730 and 1755, when the Dom João V style of carving spread through Minas Gerais, typical Joanine retables are almost absent locally, making the Saint Anne altarpiece a notable surviving example of the second phase of the Baroque in Minas Gerais.

At the top, the retable ends in a canopy with volutes and figures of angels, with a crowning that includes a Holy Trinity whose three figures—the Father, the Son and the Holy Spirit—do not touch one another. Below it are the throne, whose outline is elaborately cut, and the tabernacle, which carries ornament in half relief; the altar frontal is carved with a network of foliage and other motifs. At the sides, pilasters with floral carving stand next to twisted columns whose lower third is plain, a niche with shell-like carving is set on each side, and angels in relief are carved on the quartelões.

On the patron saint's throne stands a sculptural group of Saint Anne, Saint Joseph and Saint Joachim, which, together with two images of the Virgin and one of Saint Michael the Archangel, forms a notable collection of imagery in the chapel.
