= Odebrecht (disambiguation) =

Odebrecht is a Brazilian company.

Odebrecht may also refer to:

- Odebrecht Foundation
- Norberto Odebrecht Construtora
- Odebrecht (surname)
