= Guidolin =

Guidolin is a surname. Notable people with the surname include:

- Aldo Guidolin, Canadian ice hockey coach
- Bep Guidolin, Canadian ice hockey player
- Francesco Guidolin, Italian association football coach
- Luciano Guidolin (born 1972), Brazilian businessman, CEO of Odebrecht
- Rodrigo Guidolin, Brazilian tennis player
