= Odebrecht (surname) =

Odebrecht is a surname; notable people with this surname include:

- Emil Odebrecht (1835–1912), German immigrant and Brazilian entrepreneur
- Emilio Odebrecht (1894–1962), Brazilian engineer
- Felix Odebrecht (born 1984), German cyclist
- Job Odebrecht (1892–1982), German general
- Marcelo Odebrecht (born 1968), Brazilian entrepreneur
- Norberto Odebrecht (1920–2014), Brazilian construction engineer, founder of Odebrecht S.A.
- Rudolf Odebrecht (1889–1945), German philosopher
- Viola Odebrecht (born 1983), German woman footballer
