= Newton de Souza =

Brazilian businessman

- Born: Newton Sérgio de Souza
- Education: Pontifícia Universidade Católica do Rio de Janeiro; University of Pennsylvania
- Occupation: Businessman
- Title: Former president and CEO of Odebrecht
- Term: 2015-17
- Predecessor: Marcelo Odebrecht
- Successor: Luciano Guidolin

Newton Sérgio de Souza is a Brazilian businessman, the former president and chief executive officer of Odebrecht, a diversified Brazilian conglomerate, which is Latin America's largest construction company, a post he held from 2015 to 2017.

== Early life ==
Newton de Souza has a law degree from Pontifícia Universidade Católica do Rio de Janeiro, an MA from the University of Pennsylvania Law School and an LLM from the University of Pennsylvania.

== Career ==
In December 2015, de Souza was appointed the president and chief executive officer of Odebrecht, following Marcelo Odebrecht's imprisonment.

He was previously Odebrecht's head of fiduciary affairs and governance, and had been interim chief executive officer since June 2015.

In May 2017, he was replaced as chief executive officer by Luciano Guidolin, a "longtime executive".
