= AGSA =

AGSA may refer to:

- The Department for Safeguarding the Interests of Afghanistan, now named KHAD (Khadamat-e Aetla'at-e Dawlati)
- The Alliance of Girls' Schools Australasia
- Andrade Gutierrez S.A., a Brazilian private conglomerate
- The Art Gallery of South Australia
- The Auditor General of South Africa
