= Bergiaria westermanni =

Conservation status
- Least Concern (IUCN 3.1)

Scientific classification
- Kingdom: Animalia
- Phylum: Chordata
- Class: Actinopterygii
- Order: Siluriformes
- Family: Pimelodidae
- Genus: Bergiaria
- Species: B. westermanni

Binomial name
- Bergiaria westermanni (Lütken, 1874)

Synonyms
- Pimelodus westermanni Lütken (ex Reinhardt), 1874; Silurus vaillantii Cuvier, 1816; Iheringichthys westermanni (Lütken, 1874)

Species of fish

Bergiaria westermanni is a species of long-whiskered catfish native to the Das Velhas River basin in Brazil as well as being reported to occur in Argentina and Uruguay. This species grows to a length of 19.7 centimetres (7.8 in) SL.
