= Júlio (footballer, born 2003) =

Brazilian footballer (born 2003)

Personal information
- Full name: Júlio César Alves Gonçalves
- Date of birth: 28 September 2003 (age 23)
- Place of birth: Raposos, Brazil
- Height: 1.86 m (6 ft 1 in)
- Position: Centre back

Team information
- Current team: Ceará
- Number: 18

Youth career
- 2014–2023: América Mineiro

Senior career*
Years	Team	Apps	(Gls)
2023–2026	América Mineiro	62	(1)
2026–	Ceará	35	(3)
- * Club domestic league appearances and goals as of 18 November 2026

Júlio César Alves Gonçalves (born 28 September 2003), simply known as Júlio, is a Brazilian professional footballer who plays as a central defender for Ceará.

== Career ==
Born in Raposos, Minas Gerais, Júlio joined América Mineiro's youth setup in 2014. He signed his first professional contract with the club on 9 February 2021, signing a two-year deal.

Júlio made his first team debut on 26 March 2022, coming on as a second-half substitute for fellow youth graduate Gustavo Marques in a 1–1 Campeonato Mineiro home draw against Tombense. He returned to the under-20 squad after a further first team appearance, and helped the team to reach the 2023 Copa São Paulo de Futebol Júnior, as a starter. On 8 February 2023, he renewed his contract until the end of 2025.

== Career statistics ==
As of 7 June 2023

Club	Season	League			State League		Cup		Continental		Other		Total	
Club	Season	Division	Apps	Goals	Apps	Goals	Apps	Goals	Apps	Goals	Apps	Goals	Apps	Goals
América Mineiro	2022	Série A	0	0	1	0	0	0	—		—		1	0
América Mineiro	2023	Série A	1	0	0	0	0	0	2 (Note: Appearance(s) in Copa Sudamericana)	0	—		3	0
Career total			1	0	1	0	0	0	2	0	0	0	4	0
