= Church of Our Lady of the Rosary of Black Men =

Church of Our Lady of the Rosary of Black Men' may refer to:

- Church of Our Lady of the Rosary of Black Men (Pirenópolis), Brazil
- Church of Our Lady of the Rosary of Black Men (Sabará), Brazil
- Church of Our Lady of the Rosary of Black Men (São Cristóvão), Brazil
- Church of Our Lady of the Rosary of Black Men (São Paulo), Brazil
