= Foz do Brasil =

Foz do Brasil S.A.
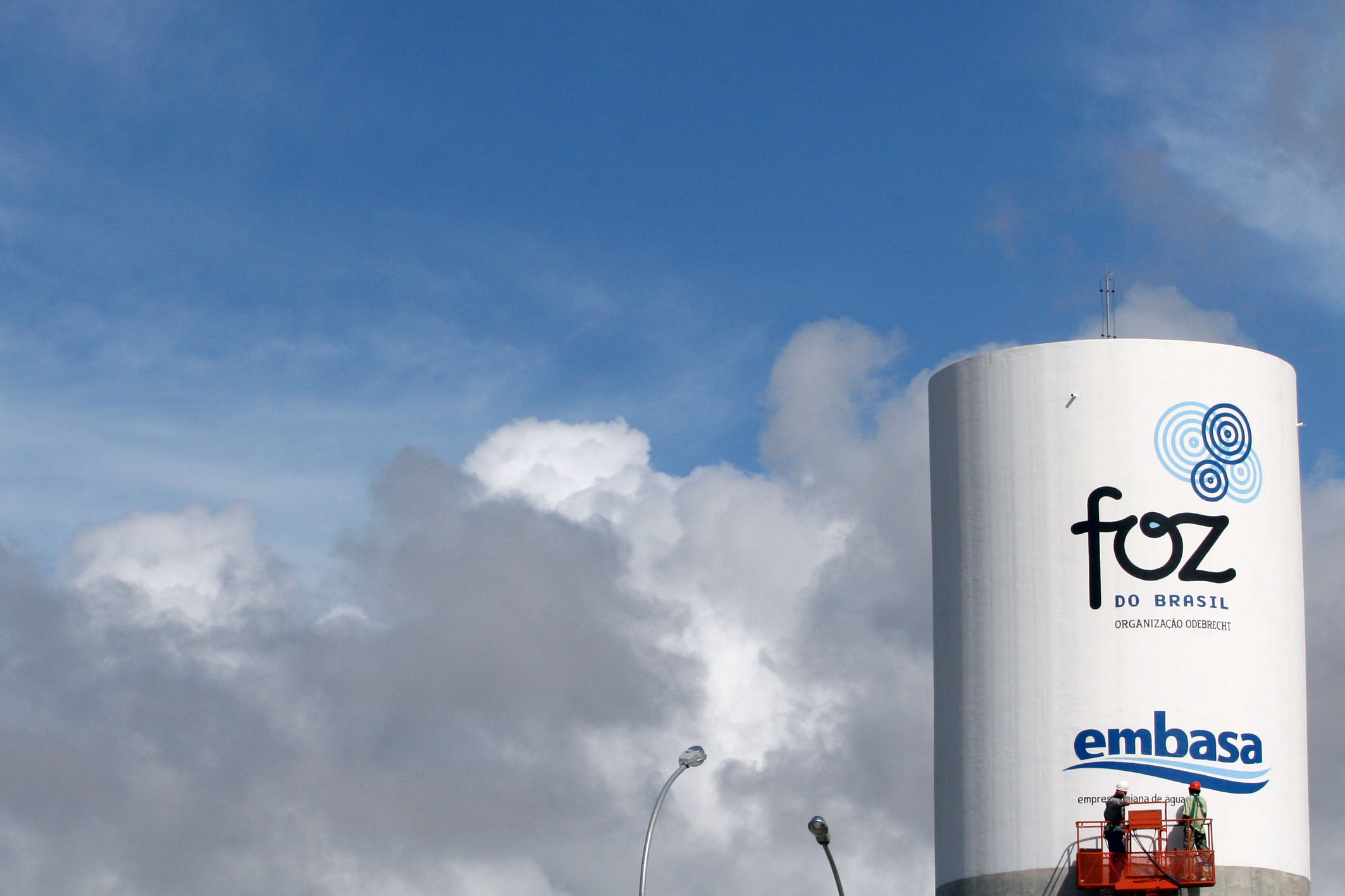
- Company type: Private
- Industry: Waste Management
- Founded: 2008
- Headquarters: Limeira, Brazil
- Key people: Fernando Santos Reis, (CEO)
- Products: Basic Sanitation; Water
- Revenue: ▲US$ 2.0 billion (2011)
- Net income: ▲US$ 19.4 million (2011)
- Number of employees: 6,000
- Parent: Odebrecht
- Website: www.fozdobrasil.com.br

Foz do Brasil was a Brazilian sanitation and waste management company, founded in 2008 and headquartered in Limeira. The company was owned by Brazilian conglomerate Odebrecht, operating in 150 cities in 18 Brazilian states with 9 million of customers.

Foz do Brasil partnered with the French company Ondeo to provide water treatment and sewage collection for the Limeira population. Additionally, the company also provided services to the municipalities of Rio Claro, Mauá, São Paulo and Campinas (SANASA). It also operated in Cachoeiro de Itapemirim and Vitória in Espírito Santo at Cesan, in Salvador at Embasa, at Rio das Ostras in Rio de Janeiro and in Mossoró at Rio Grande do Norte.

In 2011, Foz do Brasil admitted that it sent incorrect invoices to its customers, attributing the errors to “inconsistencies in the old service register” and guaranteeing that the company would waive the bills for residential, commercial and public customers who consumed up to 6m3 of water.

In 2014, it changed its name to Odebrecht Ambiental.
