= Ribeirão Arrudas =

Stream in Minas Gerais, Brazil

Coordinates: 19°54′51″S 43°56′12″W

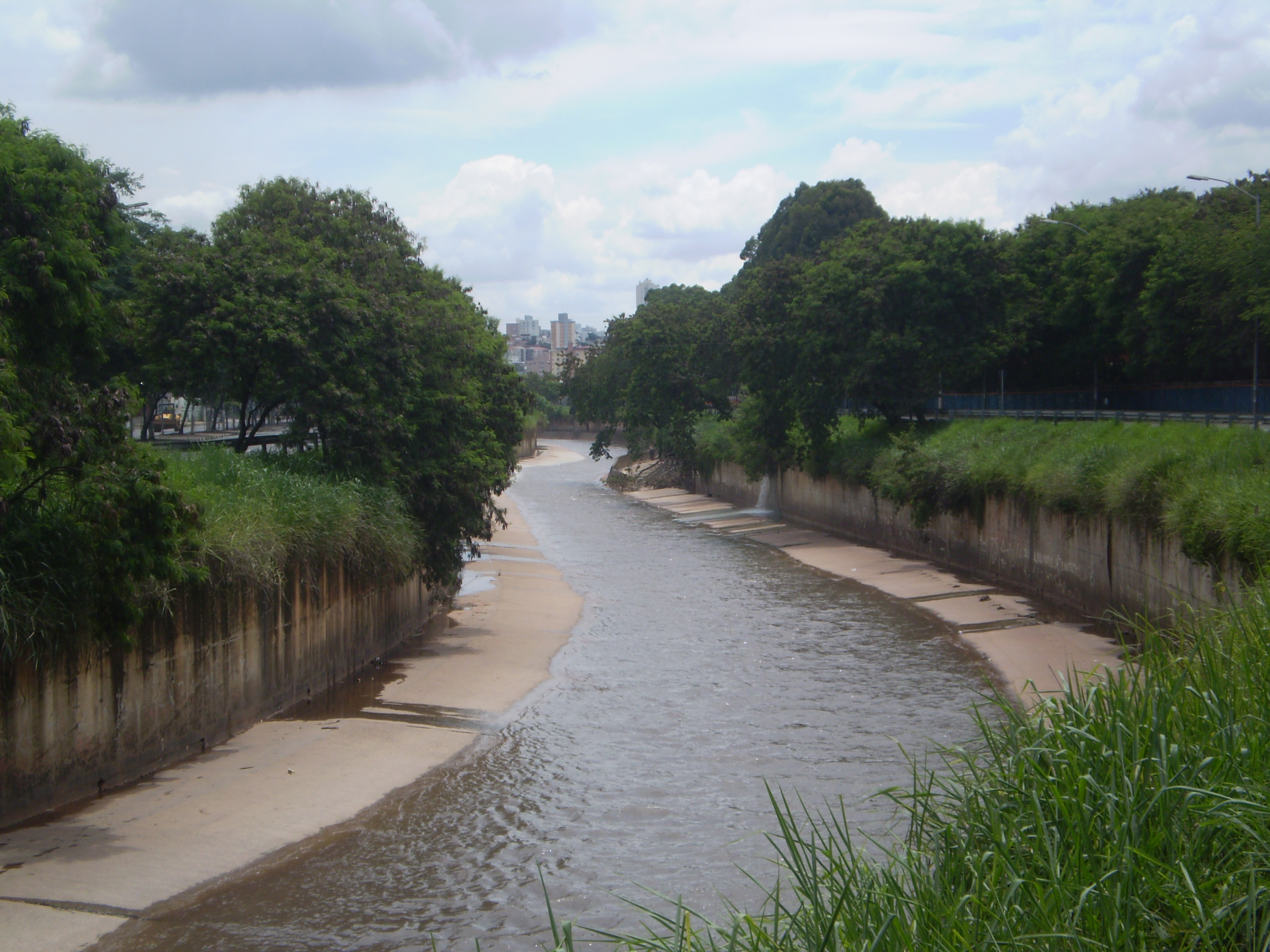
Ribeirão Arrudas in Belo Horizonte

Arrudas is a stream that begins its course in Contagem and goes down through Belo Horizonte in the Brazilian state of Minas Gerais. It is one of the sources of Das Velhas River Rio das Velhas in Sabará. Ribeirão Arrudas is formed by many streams: Jatobá, Barreiro, Bonsucesso, Cercadinho, Piteiras, Leitão, Acaba Mundo, Serra, Taquaril, Navio-baleia, Santa Terezinha, Ferrugem, Tijuco, Pastinho, among others, which are the tributaries of Arrudas. Together, Arrudas and its affluents form the Arrudas River Basin Bacia do Ribeirão Arrudas.

Although most of the sources that make this important tributary of the Rio das Velhas are still clean, almost all sewage from Contagem and from Belo Horizonte is being dumped into Arrudas, which also jeopardizes Rio das Velhas Basin and Rio São Francisco Basin. The rapid and disorderly Urbanization of Contagem Belo Horizonte and later the construction of avenues to alleviate traffic in Belo Horizonte had removed the green on the banks of Arrudas, contributing to the increase in temperature in the city. In addition, the concrete riverbed added to the increasing soil sealing of the city have caused increasingly destructive floods along the basins of the Arruda and Rio das Velhas, in recent years.

The recent construction of boulevards, as government attempts to solve the traffic problem in Belo Horizonte covered part of the stream, altering significantly the landscape of the city.
