= Sabará =

Municipality in Minas Gerais, Brazil

- Municipality
- Municipality of Sabará
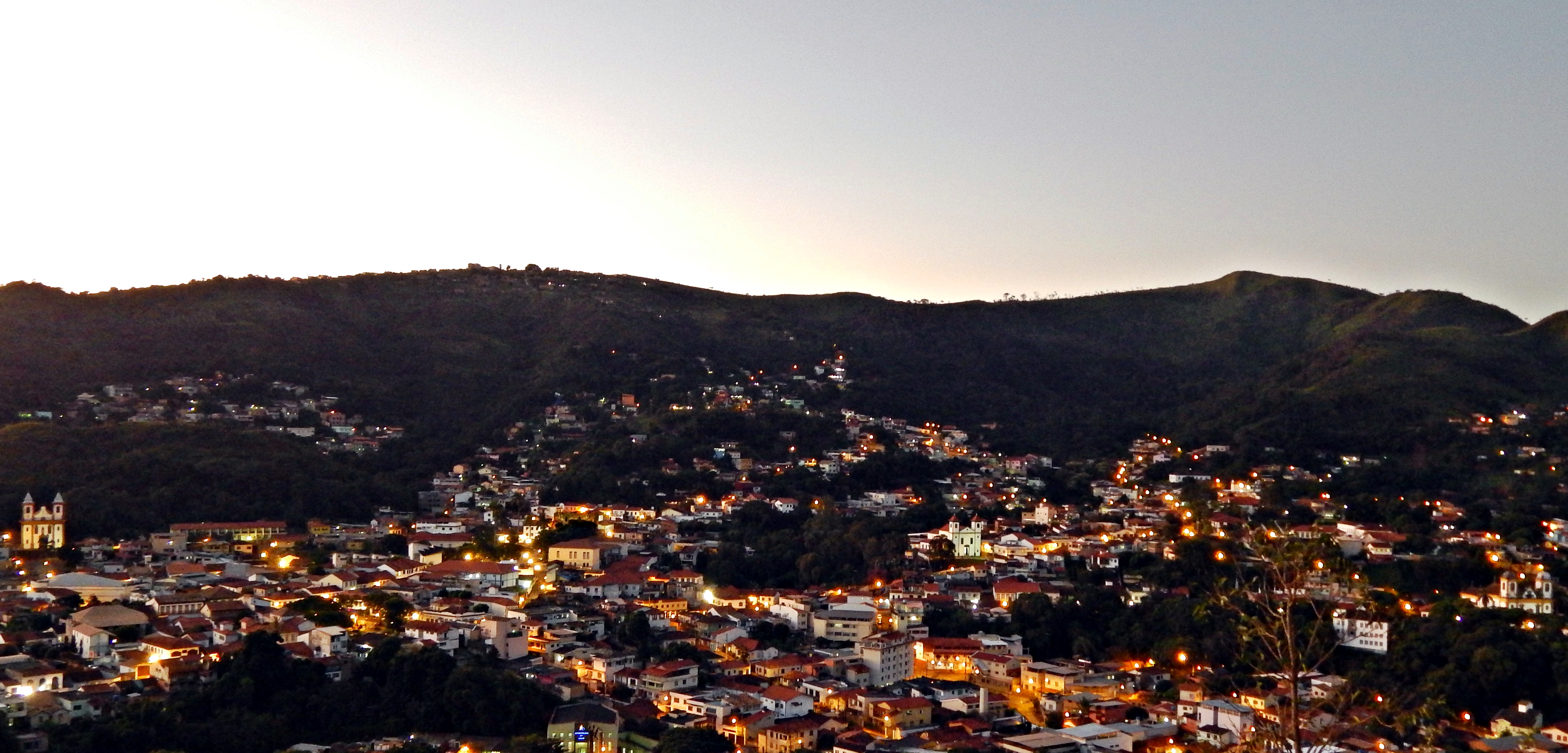
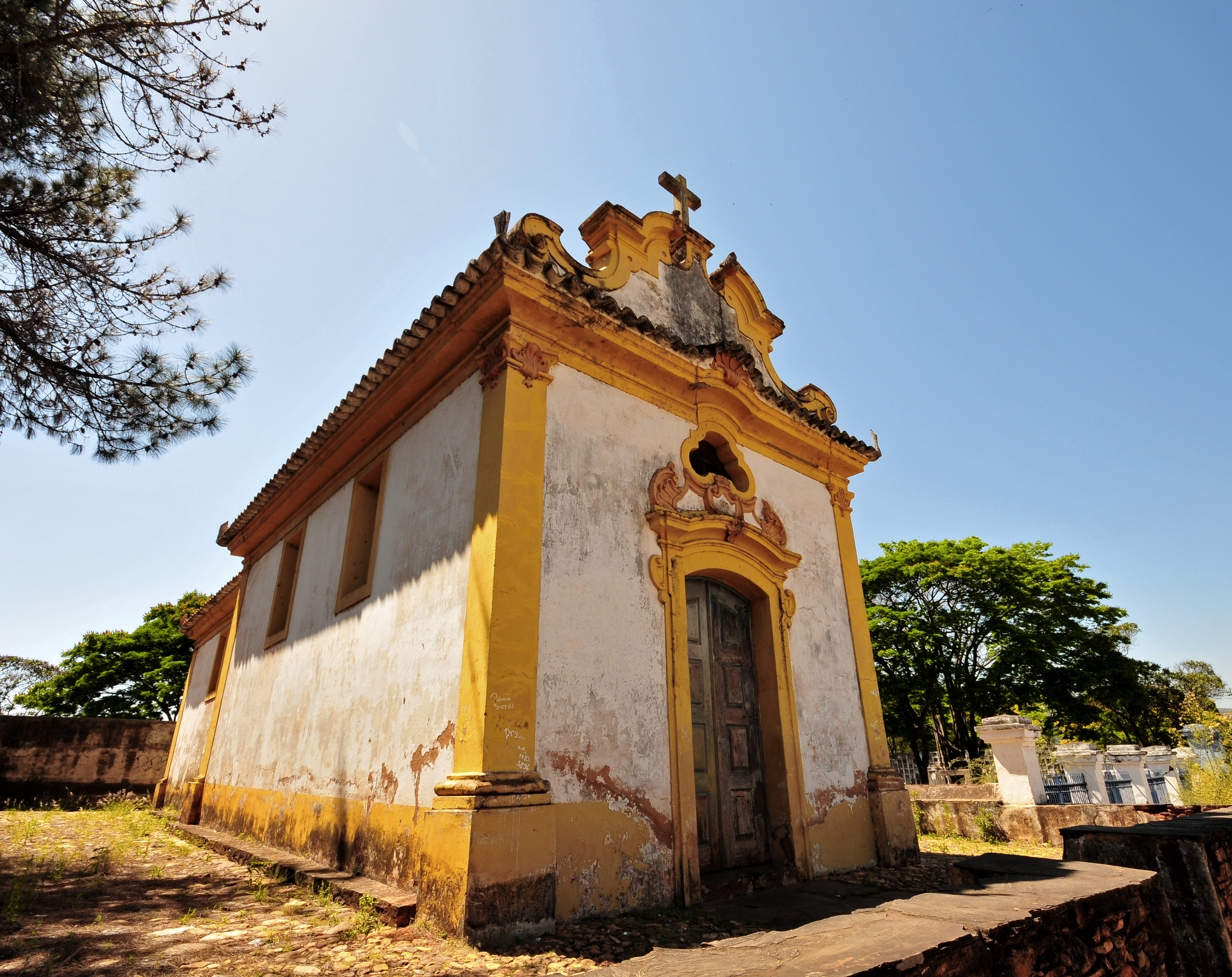
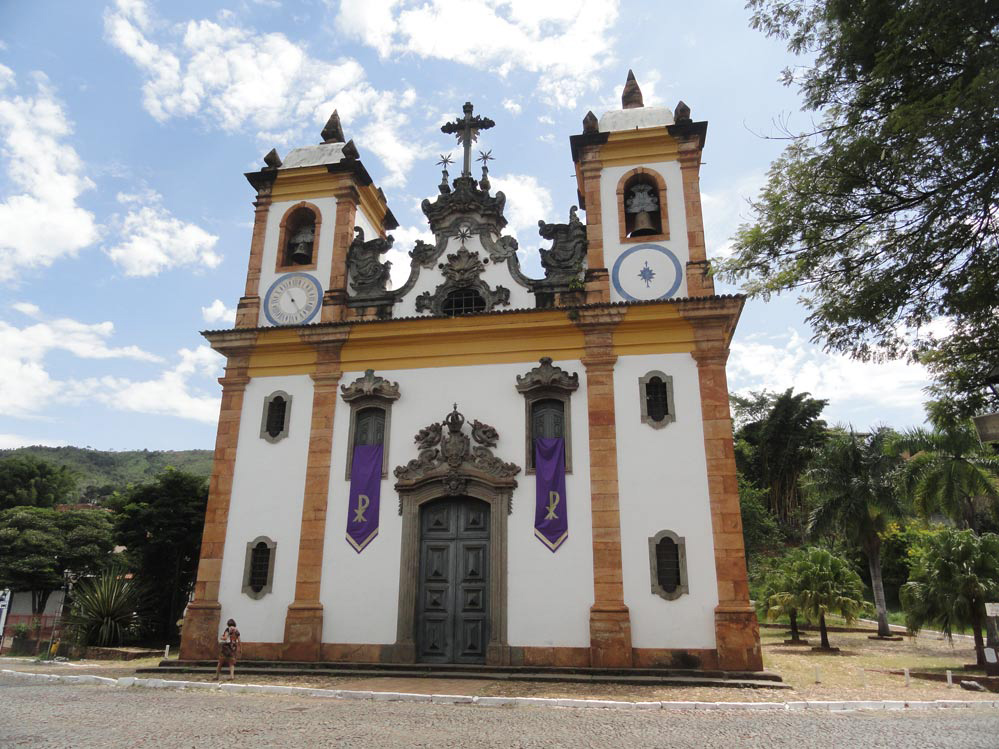
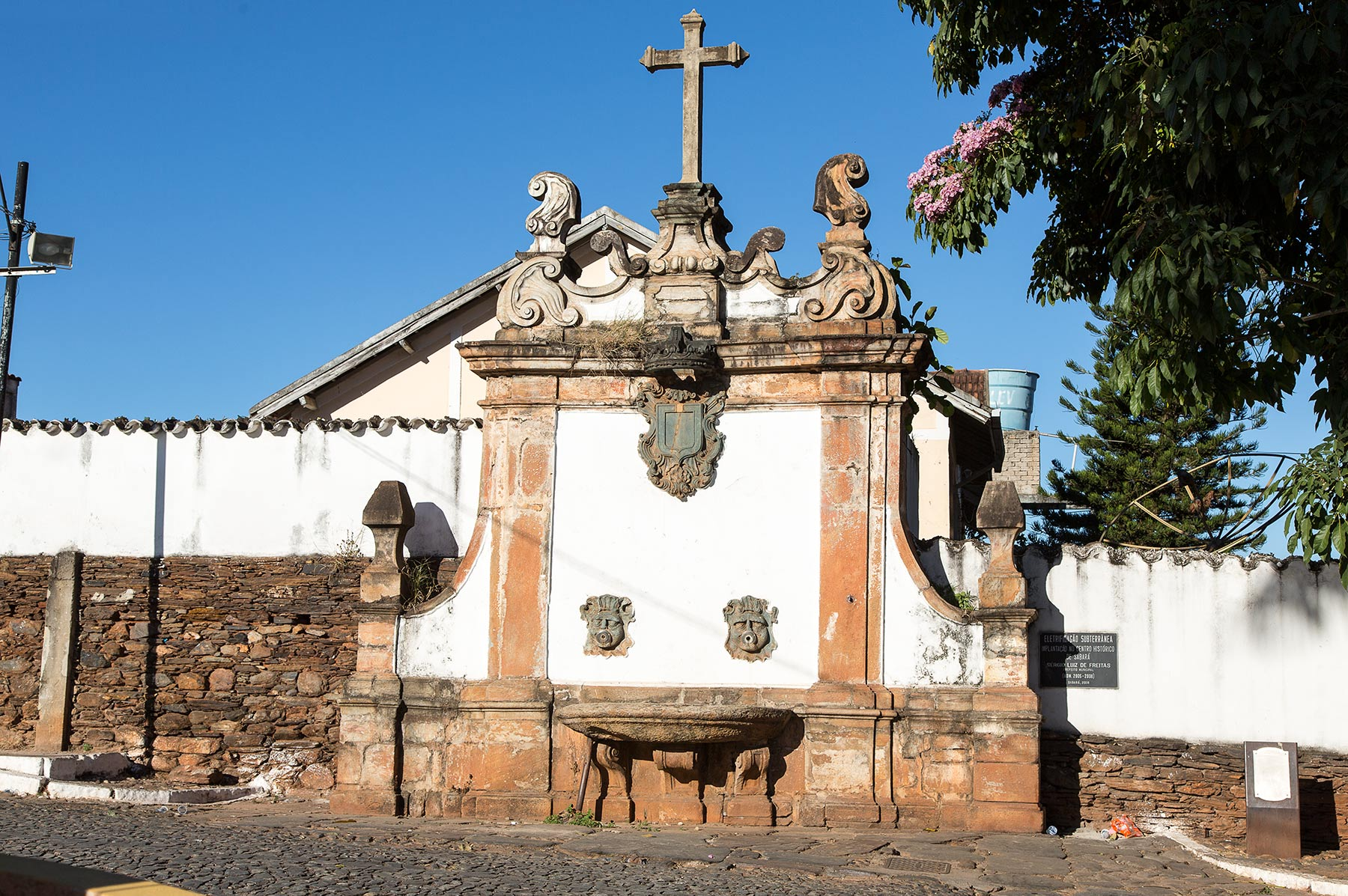
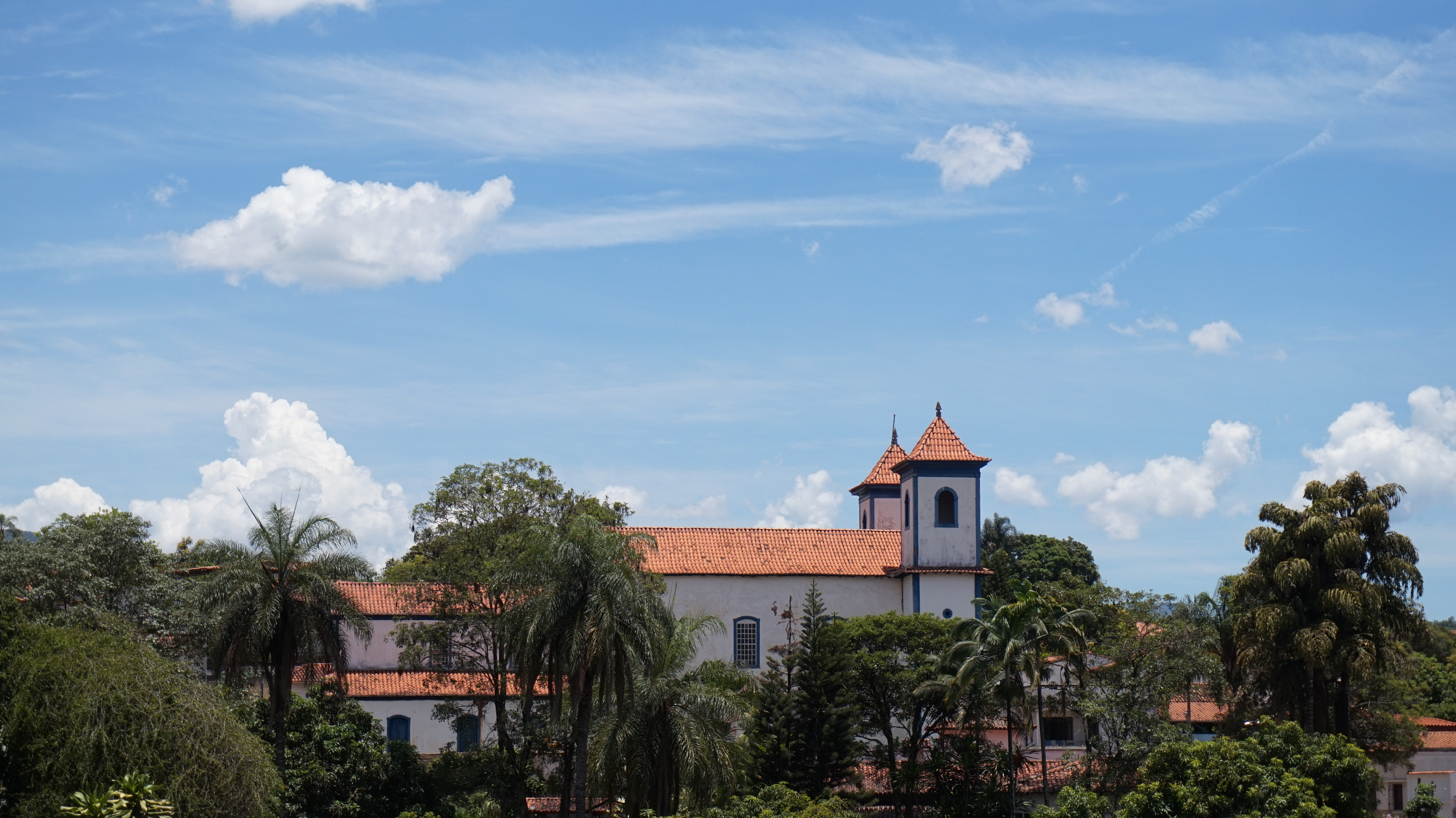

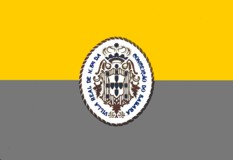
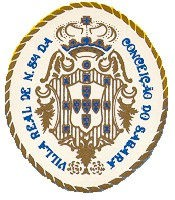
- Flag Coat of arms

- Location in Minas Gerais

- Location in Brazil
- Coordinates: 19°53′09″S 43°48′25″W
- Country: Brazil
- Region: Southeast
- State: Minas Gerais
- Founded: 1711
- Vila (town) status: 17 July 1711
- City status: 1838

Government
  - Mayor: Rodolfo Tadeu da Silva (Republicanos)

Area
  - Total: 302.453 km^{2} (116.778 sq mi)
- Elevation: 705 m (2,313 ft)

Population (2022 Census)
  - Total: 129,380
  - Estimate (2026): 134,850
  - Density: 427.77/km^{2} (1,107.9/sq mi)
- Demonym: Sabaraense
- Time zone: UTC−3 (BRT)
- HDI (2010): 0.731 – high

Sabará is a Brazilian municipality located in the state of Minas Gerais. The city belongs to the Belo Horizonte metropolitan region and to the associated microregion. Its population was 129,380 at the 2022 census.

Sabará grew from mining settlements formed in the late 17th century where the Sabará River meets the Rio das Velhas, in an area whose colonization began in the 1670s. It became a vila (town) in 1711, the year counted as its foundation, and the seat of a comarca in 1714; it prospered with gold mining and was raised to city status in 1838. In 1921 the Companhia Siderúrgica Belgo-Mineira set up an iron and steel plant there, and the town developed into an industrial center.

The town has 18th-century churches, fountains and houses, the Municipal Theater, opened in 1819, and the Museu do Ouro (Gold Museum), housed in the former royal smelting house. Many of these buildings are individually listed as national heritage, as is the architectural ensemble of Rua Dom Pedro II. Its events include the Festival da Jabuticaba, first held in 1987, and an ora-pro-nóbis food festival in the village of Pompéu.

== Etymology ==
The municipality and the town take their name from the Sabará River, a tributary of the Rio das Velhas. For several years the town was called Vila Real de Nossa Senhora da Conceição de Sabarabussu, or simply Vila Real.

The history of the municipality published by the Brazilian Institute of Geography and Statistics (IBGE) records two explanations for the word. According to Theodoro Sampaio, Sabará comes from an older form, Tabará, a contraction of itaberaba ("shining stone"), and Sabaraboçu is a corruption of ita-beraba-uçu, "large shining stone", also understood as "resplendent mountain range". The other explanation, from the História Antiga de Minas Gerais and endorsed by Zoroastro Passos, is that the indigenous inhabitants called the Rio das Velhas cuba ("father") below its confluence and çubara ("divided father") above it, naming the larger branch Çubará-boçú and the smaller one Çubará-mirim; the first later became known as the Rio das Velhas and the second simply as the Sabará.

== History ==
=== Origins ===
The history of Sabará is linked to the legend of Sabarabuçu, which colonists sought in the sertão as "a mountain range made of silver and precious stones". Cláudia Damasceno Fonseca places the beginning of colonization in the Rio das Velhas area in 1675. In that year the expedition of Fernão Dias Pais was combing the backlands near the Serra do Espinhaço for the emeralds of Sabarabuçu. Camps (arraiais) were set up along its way, and some of them endured as settlements. Two of these, Sumidouro and Santo Antônio do Bom Retiro da Roça Grande, were founded by Fernão Dias's son-in-law, Manuel de Borba Gato, who was among the first to find gold in the region. The Diário do Comércio dates the arrival of Fernão Dias's expedition in the region to 1674. It states that Matias Cardoso de Albuquerque, chosen by Fernão Dias to lead the expedition's advance party, found a site with a water source, safe from floods and with a point where the river could be crossed on foot, and that Sabará thus became a stopping place on the way across the sertão.

The exploration of the Sabarabuçu region is attributed to bandeirantes from São Paulo led by Borba Gato. The physician and historian Zoroastro Viana Passos, who wrote several works on the history of Sabará, disputed this and held that men from Bahia had reached the Sabará backlands before the paulistas. According to the IBGE history, the date on which the settlement was founded was not recorded precisely: if Borba Gato is taken as its founder, it falls between 1672 and 1678, and the writer Lúcia Machado de Almeida gave the year 1674.

The town itself took shape from small mining settlements that grew up from the late 17th century around the confluence of the Sabará River with the Rio das Velhas, at a bend of the latter. Its main quarters, among them Morro da Barra, Igreja Grande, Caquende and Rosário, developed from settlements on the right bank of the Sabará. Morro da Barra was the site of the barracks and later of the gold assaying office, and Igreja Grande that of the parish church. Across the Sabará, on its left bank, were Arraial Velho (with the Chapel of Saint Anne), the arraial of Cachoeira and the small outlying quarter of Tapanhuacanga, where the Church of Our Lady of Ó was built. According to historians, Borba Gato was buried near Arraial Velho in the Chapel of Saint Antony of Mouraria, which fell down early in the 20th century. A guide published in 2018 by the National Institute of Historic and Artistic Heritage (IPHAN) notes that Sabará is regarded as the earliest settlement in Minas Gerais, with origins in the last decade of the 17th century. The guide names Barra, at the confluence of the two rivers, and Igreja Grande (or Igreja Nova) as the two principal settlements. Barra received the council house when the town was created in 1711; Igreja Grande by then had a church acting as its parish church, probably instituted around 1701.

=== Town and gold-mining center ===
By about 1700 the Arraial da Barra do Sabará was a commercial center connected to the Estrada Real and one of the most populous settlements of the mining region. To curb gold smuggling, the Overseas Council decided in 1709 that a town should be founded at the terminus of each of the three main routes into the mining region. In Fonseca's account, Santo Antônio da Roça Grande, which had the more strategic position on the route to Bahia, would have been the expected choice in the Rio das Velhas region, but the War of the Emboabas had left the royal representatives distrustful of the Paulistas. The arraial of Nossa Senhora da Conceição do Sabará was peopled mostly by Portuguese-born settlers (reinóis), whereas bandeirantes led by Borba Gato held sway in Roça Grande, so it was Sabará that the governor raised to town status in 1711.

The act creating the town of Vila Real de Nossa Senhora da Conceição do Sabará was signed on 17 July 1711 in the presence of Governor Antônio de Albuquerque Coelho de Carvalho and a general assembly of the settlement's leading residents. It was the last of the first three towns created in the mining region. The year 1711 is counted as the foundation of the municipality. The IBGE history gives the town's name as Vila Real de Nossa Senhora da Conceição de Sabarabussu and the date of its installation as 19 July 1711. The Diário do Comércio adds that it was also known as Vila do Sabará. According to the Instituto Histórico e Geográfico de Minas Gerais, the creation of the town was confirmed by a royal charter of 31 October 1712; the IBGE history mentions a provisão (provision) of 9 January 1715 confirming it.

A royal charter of 1714, which divided the captaincy of Minas into four comarcas, made the town the seat of the comarca of Vila Real de Sabará, which also included the termo (municipal territory) of Vila Nova da Rainha, present-day Caeté. The Diário do Comércio calls it the Comarca do Rio das Velhas and states that its jurisdiction reached the borders of Goiás, Pernambuco and Bahia. As the seat of the comarca and of the royal gold assaying office and foundry, Sabará was home to senior authorities, and many officials of the Portuguese administration lived there. Its council's jurisdiction remained extensive after Vila Nova da Rainha do Caeté (1714) and Pitangui (1715) were made towns: it took in the northern part of the left bank of the São Francisco, including the region of Paracatu, which was not separated from it until 1798. Alongside its mining and its political, fiscal and judicial role, Sabará grew into a major commercial center, which Fonseca explains by the productive countryside around it and, above all, by its location on the routes leading to the heart of the captaincy, to the São Francisco corrals and to Bahia.

Gold production was large, and Sabará was one of the mining centers of the province that sent the most gold to the Portuguese Crown. A Casa da Intendência, or Casa da Fundição, was set up in the town to collect the quinto, the royal fifth. The town had one of the largest enslaved populations of the period. According to the Museu do Ouro, the Sabará smelting house began operating in July 1734. The following year the Crown adopted a new system for collecting the royal fifth, the capitation, and gold intendancies were set up in the comarca seats; Sabará's Casa da Real Intendência do Ouro was established by a royal charter of 28 January 1736. A royal charter of 1 August 1751 ordered its building to be reconstructed, and the building may have acquired its present two-story form as a result. The Sabará house was abolished in 1830.

=== Empire and later history ===
In 1822 Sabará contributed money and volunteers to the struggle for independence. On 24 February 1823 Emperor Pedro I granted the town the title of Fidelíssima ("most faithful"). Sabará was raised to the status of city in 1838: the IBGE history cites provincial law no. 93 of 6 June 1838, while the IPHAN guide dates the elevation to 6 March 1838.

After the end of the gold cycle the town kept some commercial activity for much of the 19th century, and gold was still mined in the municipality in 2019. Fonseca credits the steadiness of the 19th-century economy to several developments: farming and cattle raising expanded, foreign companies mined gold on an industrial scale, services such as health and education grew, and a railway came to connect Sabará with Ouro Preto and Rio de Janeiro. The arrival of the Central do Brasil railway began an iron cycle that the Diário do Comércio described as continuing in 2019. Sabará became a major industrial center after the Companhia Siderúrgica Belgo-Mineira established its iron and steelworks there in 1921, an event Fonseca counts as a landmark in the town's history. The expansion that followed, and what she calls "modernisation", altered the townscape left from the colonial period, but nearly all the 18th-century churches survived, together with some of the old houses.

The municipality's territory changed several times in the 20th century. In 1911 it comprised the districts of Sabará, Lapa and Raposos. It acquired the district of Cuibá from Caeté in 1923, and in 1938 it lost Lapa to Santa Luzia and Raposos to Nova Lima, while gaining Marzagão from Belo Horizonte. In 1943 Marzagão was renamed Marzagânia and Cuibá became Mestre Caetano. In 1953 Sabará acquired from Santa Luzia the district of Ravena, formerly Lapa. By the territorial division of 31 December 1963, Marzagânia had been renamed Carvalho de Brito.

== Geography ==
Sabará is in the Belo Horizonte metropolitan region, within 50 km (31 mi) east of Belo Horizonte. The city lies on the Rio das Velhas at an elevation of 705 m (2,313 ft). In IBGE's regional divisions the municipality belongs to the Belo Horizonte microregion, in the Metropolitana de Belo Horizonte mesoregion, and to the immediate and intermediate geographic regions of Belo Horizonte. A federal survey published in 2005 described Sabará as undergoing conurbation with Belo Horizonte, with parts of its territory functioning as a periphery of the capital. According to IBGE, the municipality had an area of 302.453 km^{2} (116.778 sq mi) in 2025.

The Sabará River runs westward through the municipality and flows into the Rio das Velhas at the town. The municipality is divided into four districts: Sabará, Carvalho de Brito, Mestre Caetano and Ravena.

== Demographics ==
The 2022 census counted 129,380 residents in Sabará, compared with 126,269 in the 2010 census. IBGE estimated the population at 134,850 in 2026. The inhabitants are called sabaraenses.

== Economy ==
IBGE put the municipality's gross domestic product at current prices at R$3.84 billion in 2023. Encyclopædia Britannica lists iron mining and metallurgy among the city's economic activities.

== Government ==
The mayor is Rodolfo Tadeu da Silva, known as Sargento Rodolfo, of the Republicanos party. He was elected on 6 October 2024 for a four-year term, with 41,204 votes, 62.13% of the valid votes. The runner-up, Professor Costela of the Social Democratic Party (PSD), received 25,114 votes; he was the candidate backed by the then mayor, Wander Borges of the Brazilian Socialist Party (PSB), who was serving his fourth term.

== Heritage ==
Sabará is a historic town with baroque churches, colonial buildings and a gold-mining museum. Most of its historic and architectural attractions are in the historic center: 18th-century churches, the Municipal Theater, the Museu do Ouro, fountains and colonial houses. Some of the town's churches combine artistic features of different phases of the Minas Gerais baroque. Sabará is counted among the historic cities of Minas Gerais, together with Ouro Preto, São João del-Rei, Diamantina, Mariana, Tiradentes and Congonhas.

The 2018 IPHAN guide regards the nearness of Belo Horizonte as having worked against the conservation of the town's monuments, and especially of its colonial urban ensemble. It says that Sabará's historic center survives only along Rua Pedro II (the former Rua Direita), although the buildings individually listed by IPHAN and by the state heritage institute, IEPHA-MG, were spared. A survey by the federal Programa Monumenta, published in 2005, noted that Sabará had not been listed as a historic town as such: its federal ensemble listing covered a single street, Rua Dom Pedro II, and outside it there were 16 further individual federal listings, besides federal and state listings in the districts. In 2020 the Instituto Histórico e Geográfico de Minas Gerais counted 19 properties in Sabará recognized as Brazilian cultural heritage.

=== Rua Dom Pedro II ===
The former Rua Direita, now Rua Dom Pedro II, was opened in the early 18th century and became the main street of the settlement. The IPHAN guide describes the town's growth as following this street and gathering around two buildings that represented political and fiscal authority. One was the council house and jail in Barra, built about 1738 and since demolished; the other, on the nearby Morro da Barra, was the smelting house, whose building now holds the Museu do Ouro. The street's architectural and urban ensemble was listed by IPHAN on 27 October 1965. On its lower stretch are the Solar do Padre Correia, which houses the city hall, and the Casa Azul, whose portal is in the Rococo style; the Municipal Theater, formerly the town's opera house, stands at the upper end.

The Solar, also called Solar Jacinto Dias, dates from around 1773, when it was built as the home of Father José Correia da Silva. Guests it received in the 19th and 20th centuries included the emperors of Brazil, and the Rococo carving of its chapel is attributed to Aleijadinho. Facing the Solar is the Casa Azul, a single-story house whose construction date is not reliably known. Two of the priest's brothers, both also priests, lived there; inside, several rooms have painted ceilings, and a small chapel has a carved and gilded altarpiece.

=== Churches and fountains ===
The parish of Our Lady of the Conception, created at the beginning of the 18th century, was among the first in the Minas region. Its church is laid out with three naves, and the chancel altar and its altarpiece are the work of Francisco Vieira Servas, from Portugal. The Diário do Comércio notes that the church shows features of three periods of baroque art. The Church of Our Lady of Ó was built around 1720; its seven panels with Chinese motifs are attributed to the painter Jacinto Ribeiro. Gilded carving and painting cover the whole of its interior; in the nave, panels on the walls and ceiling depict symbols and scenes relating to the Virgin Mary.

The Third Order of Carmel started building the Church of Our Lady of Mount Carmel in 1763, to plans by the master mason Tiago Moreira. Aleijadinho's work there from 1771 transformed the façade, which gained a decorated pediment and a soapstone portal, both Rococo. He and his workshop were also responsible, between 1779 and 1783, for the two pulpits, the balustrade dividing the nave and the high choir. The construction of the Church of Our Lady of the Rosary of Black Men, begun in the late 18th century, extended through practically the whole of the 19th century. Shortages of money in its brotherhood repeatedly halted the work, which stopped for good after the abolition of slavery in 1888, with the main body of the church still incomplete. Its ruins are among the town's sights. The Church of Saint Anne, in Arraial Velho, was built in the mid-18th century; the present building is a reconstruction by IPHAN, which listed it in 1950, when it was completely abandoned.

IPHAN listed the Rosário and Caquende fountains in 1950. The Rosário fountain was built under a contract of 1746 and remodeled in 1782; at a later date it was taken down at its first site and re-erected in the Largo do Rosário. The Caquende fountain dates from the mid-18th century, and its water comes from a spring behind the Church of Saint Francis.

=== Historic structures ===
Sabará is home to numerous colonial-period historic structures, many designated as Brazilian national monuments by the National Institute of Historic and Artistic Heritage (IPHAN); others are designated as state or municipal monuments or recognized as Portuguese-era monuments as Heritage of Portuguese Influence by Calouste Gulbenkian Foundation. According to the Programa Monumenta survey, IPHAN listed the churches of Our Lady of the Conception, Mercy, Mount Carmel, the Rosary, Ó and Saint Francis of Assisi, and a house on Rua Borba Gato, in 1938; the Church of Pilar and Hospice of the Holy Land, the Church of Saint Anne, the Stations of the Passion of Rua Marquês de Sapucaí and of Carmo, the Caquende and Rosário fountains, the city hall building and the Museu do Ouro building in 1950; the Chapel of Saint Antony in Pompéu in 1958; the Municipal Theater in 1963; and the Casa Azul in 1965. The same survey records municipal listings of other structures, among them two small bridges, the Corte Real and Confraria fountains and the chapels of Senhor do Bom Jesus and Nossa Senhora do Bom Despacho, and the state protection of the ensemble of the Church of Our Lady of Lapa, in the Ravena district, by a decree of 1977.

The structures listed below, except the Municipal Theater, are catalogued in the Heritage of Portuguese Influence entry for Sabará, which also includes groups of houses on Rua Direita and Rua Dom Pedro II.

- Hospice of the Holy Land and Chapel of Our Lady of Pilar (Hospício da Terra Santa e Capela de Nossa Senhora do Pilar)
- Chapel of Our Lady of the Rosary (Capela de Nossa Senhora do Rosário)
- Parish Church of Our Lady of the Conception (Igreja Matriz de Nossa Senhora da Conceição)
- Church of Our Lady of Mercy (Igreja de Nossa Senhora das Mercês)
- Church of Our Lady of Mount Carmel (Igreja de Nossa Senhora do Carmo)
- Church of Our Lady of the Rosary (Igreja de Nossa Senhora do Rosário dos Pretos)
- Church of Our Lady of Ó (Igreja de Nossa Senhora do Ó)
- Saint Anne Chapel (Capela de Santana)
- Church of the Archbrotherhood of Saint Francis of Assisi
- Chapel of Saint Antony of Pompéu (Capela de Santo António de Pompéu)
- Chapels of the Stations of the Passion (Sabará) (Capelas dos Passos)
- Station of the Passion in Rua do Carmo (Passo do Carmo)
- Station of the Passion in Rua Marquês de Sapucaí
- Museum of Gold (Museu do Ouro, Antiga Casa de Intendência)
- Municipal Theater of Sabará (Teatro Municipal de Sabará)
- Caquende Fountain (Chafariz do Caquende)
- Rosário Fountain (Chafariz do Rosário)
- Casa Azul
- House of Padre Correia (Solar do Padre Correia)

== Culture ==
=== Museum and theater ===
The Museu do Ouro occupies the former Casa de Intendência e Fundição. Its exhibits include mining tools, goldsmiths' work and documents on gold extraction. After its administrative functions ended, the former intendancy building was auctioned in 1840 and bought by Comendador Séptimo da Paula Rocha. His descendants sold it in 1937, by then nearly a ruin, to Louis Ensch, an engineer who directed the Companhia Siderúrgica Belgo-Mineira; Ensch gave it to the federal government two years later. On 30 October 1940 custody of the building passed to the national heritage service, then called SPHAN, which restored it to house a museum of the history of gold mining in the former captaincy of Minas Gerais. The museum was created by a decree of President Getúlio Vargas (no. 7.483, of 23 April 1945) and opened on 16 May 1946. The building was listed as national heritage on 28 June 1950. The museum is run by the Brazilian Institute of Museums (Ibram).

The Municipal Theater, an Elizabethan-style theater originally called the Casa da Ópera, opened on 2 June 1819 on Rua Dom Pedro II. It was the second opera house built in Minas Gerais, after that of Ouro Preto. It later became the Cine-Teatro Borba Gato and fell into complete decay; IPHAN restored it in 1970. It is considered the second-oldest theater still in operation in Brazil and continues to host plays, festivals and performances. Its horseshoe-shaped hall has three tiers of boxes and 400 seats. The building has been listed by IPHAN since 1963; in June 2019, at its bicentenary, it was undergoing a restoration begun in October 2016 with federal funds, and its reopening was expected in September of that year.

=== Festivals ===
The Festival da Jabuticaba, devoted to the jabuticaba fruit and the products made from it, was first held in 1987, when producers gathered in the streets of the town to sell the fruit. In 2008 the festival was recognized as historical and cultural heritage and the jabuticaba as intangible heritage of the town. The 38th edition, in November 2024, was promoted by the city government and the association of producers of jabuticaba products (Asprodejas); its stalls offered jellies, liqueurs, preserves, sweets and other products made from the fruit, alongside cultural performances and sales of local handicrafts. According to the city government, it is the event that contributes most to the local economy, ahead even of carnival. The festival was created by Dona Zezé, mother of the historian José Bouzas. Sabará is considered the "terra da jabuticaba" (land of the jabuticaba) and gave its name to the variety of the fruit that became the most popular in Brazil. In 2011 owners of jabuticaba trees paid 5% less municipal property tax (IPTU) for each tree, up to 25%, under a law in force since 23 August 1982, adopted to encourage the preservation of the trees during a decade of urban expansion; during the festival residents "rented" their trees to visitors.

The village of Pompéu, in the Mestre Caetano district, is the setting of an annual festival devoted to ora-pro-nóbis. The festival was created in 1997 by the then mayor, Wander Borges, in partnership with the local community, and was first held on the first weekend of May that year. The 50th edition of the Sabará Winter Festival (Festival de Inverno) was scheduled to run from 17 to 28 July 2019, starting on 17 July, the town's anniversary; its program included rock concerts, theater and circus shows, cultural workshops, a meeting of bands from across the state and a craft fair.

=== Media ===
The municipality also houses TV Muro, which has been described in the press as the world's smallest television station. Its founder, Francisco Dário dos Santos, known as Chiquinho, started it as TV Verde, an environmental-awareness project with local children. Folha de S.Paulo dated this beginning to 1995 and reported that in 1999 its programs began to be shown to passers-by on a television set placed on the wall of his house, when the station took its present name; a 2014 report said that TV Verde had begun 25 years before. In 2001 its only program, Jornal Legal, also reached ten neighboring houses through a short-range transmission link. By 2014 its schedule comprised nine or ten programs, with news, film, documentaries, the environment, entertainment, public-service information and messages from the community, and a projector allowed it to show images on the side wall of the neighboring Church of Saint Francis of Assisi.

== See also ==
- List of municipalities in Minas Gerais
