= Odebrecht Energia =

Brazilian power company

- Company type: Private
- Industry: Electricity
- Founded: 2010
- Headquarters: Rio de Janeiro, Brazil
- Key people: Henrique Valadares (CEO)
- Number of employees: 1,000
- Parent: Odebrecht
- Website: http://www.odebrechtenergia.com.br

Odebrecht Energia is a Brazilian power company founded in 2010 by the Brazilian multinational Odebrecht.
