= Luciano Guidolin =

Brazilian businessman

- Born: Luciano Nitrini Guidolin; October 1972 (age 53)
- Education: Polytechnic School of the University of São Paulo; Harvard University
- Occupation: Businessman
- Title: President and CEO of Odebrecht
- Term: 2017-2019
- Predecessor: Newton de Souza
- Successor: Incumbent

Luciano Nitrini Guidolin (born October 1972) is a Brazilian businessman, former president and CEO of Odebrecht, a diversified Brazilian conglomerate, which is Latin America's largest construction company, from May 2017 until December 2019.

== Early life ==
Luciano Nitrini Guidolin was born in October 1972. He is a São Paulo native of Italian descent. He has a bachelor's degree in Production Engineering from the Polytechnic School of the University of São Paulo (USP) and an MBA from Harvard University.

== Career ==
In May 2017, Guidolin, a "longtime executive", succeeded Newton de Souza as CEO of Odebrecht.
