= TV Muro =

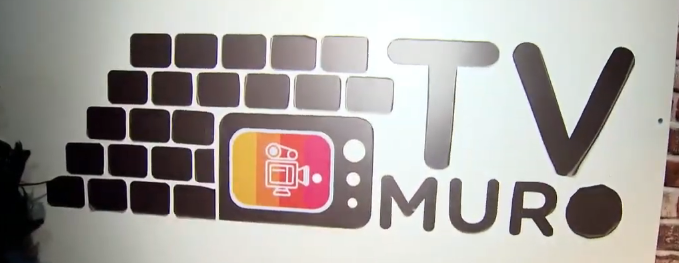
- Sabará; Brazil
- Channels: Analog: 11
- Branding: TV Muro

Ownership
- Owner: TV Muro Ltda.

History
- First air date: 1997
- Former names: TV Verde (1997-1998)

Links
- Website: www.blogdatvmuro.blogspot.com

TV Muro (channel 11) is a local, non-profit television station operating in the municipality Sabará, in the Belo Horizonte metropolitan area, Minas Gerais, Brazil. The station identifies itself as "the planet's smallest TV network".

The station was founded in 1997, with Francisco Dário dos Santos as its director since launch, staff member of the local public library, nicknamed Chiquinho. It is headquartered in a poor zone of Sabará, at number 299 of Rua São Francisco Street, next to the Church of Saint Francis of Assisi, atop the wall of Chiquinho's home, hence the name TV Muro (Wall TV). In 2005, the station was sustained from the sales of "chupe-chupe", a sweet made by Chiquinho's mother, whose revenue went to its operations.

The station has been referenced in several researches, books and scientific work on journalism. In 2003, it was praised by journalist and teacher Antônio Brasil, as a community initiative which questioned the power of the large networks. In another academic paper published in 2013, it was referred as a case study in community broadcasting in Minas Gerais, representing a situation where the communication involves and moves to watch its daily broadcasts.

== History ==
The station's origins date back to 1997 with TV Verde, when Chiquinho and a friend turned an upside down umbrella into a link and aired the programming in a cardboard box pretending to be a television set. In 1998, this upgraded to become TV Muro, set up with a scrapped link he found at a garbage can near his home, a VHS camera, a VCR machine and a black and white television set. The link was installed at the household's roof, acconditioned in a polystyrene minifridge full of bricks in order not to fly.

Almost all of its early equipment arrived to the station through barter. The camera was bought with the money of the sale of Chiquinho's only horse and the VCR by the sale of two goats, which he thought were "full of milk". Most of the equipment the station obtained over time, such as tripods, lights and sideboards, were offered by several donors, among them presenters Jô Soares and Ana Hickmann.

In 2001, TV Muro had received several equipment donations, and had a team consisting of an editor, a producer, a cameraman and a reporter, which produced its only program, Jornal Legal, which started with the catchphrase "Você que está subindo, você que está descendo, pare! E me veja aqui no muro" (If you are going up, if you are going down, stop! And see me here at the wall). It was divided into blocks, between 6pm and 9pm, with new editions on Mondays, Wednesdays and Fridays, as well as next-day repeats on Tuesdays and Thursdays, as well as a mass from the Church of Saint Francis of Assisi on Saturdays. The station's reach had increased to ten households, totalling around 40 people, as well as an additional 30 people, usually travelling on foot, in front of Chiquinho's house, to watch the program. It was estimated that the station's total potential audience was lower than 100 people.

The station aired commercials, consisting in products sold by locals, and services of Eduardo Dias' bicycling company, which was the station's cameraman. Since the station is a non-profit service, commercials are for free.

The success of the station was noted by the counting of how many viewers stopped at the causeway to watch the TV set in the wall, through a hall in its gateway.

According to Associação Brasileira de Emissoras de Rádio e Televisão, the station at the time was on the brink of illegality for lacking a federal "license, permit or authorization", according to chapter 5 of the Constitution of Brazil.

In 2003, STV - Rede SescSenac de Televisão (now SescTV) sealed a programming exchange contract with TV Muro. With this partnership, the station started airing educational programs and documentaries produced by STV, among them O Mundo da Arte, Balaio Brasil, Fragmentos, O Mundo da Fotografia and Filhos. TV Muro's productions, such as the documentary Lendas de Sabará, would be seen on STV.

The station initially had a 14-inch cathode ray tube television set assembled daily atop the wall in Chiquinho's house which gave the station its name. When it rained, he set up an umbrella atop the TV set, in order to protect it.

In 2014, a local businessman offered the station a data show projector, enabling its projection at the church's lateral wall with an image of up to 60 inches, being authorized by the priest, with the condition of not relaying its programming during the mass and not being too loud.

In May 2019, after appearing on RecordTV's Hora do Faro, presented by Rodrigo Faro, the station gained new equipment, totally reformed.

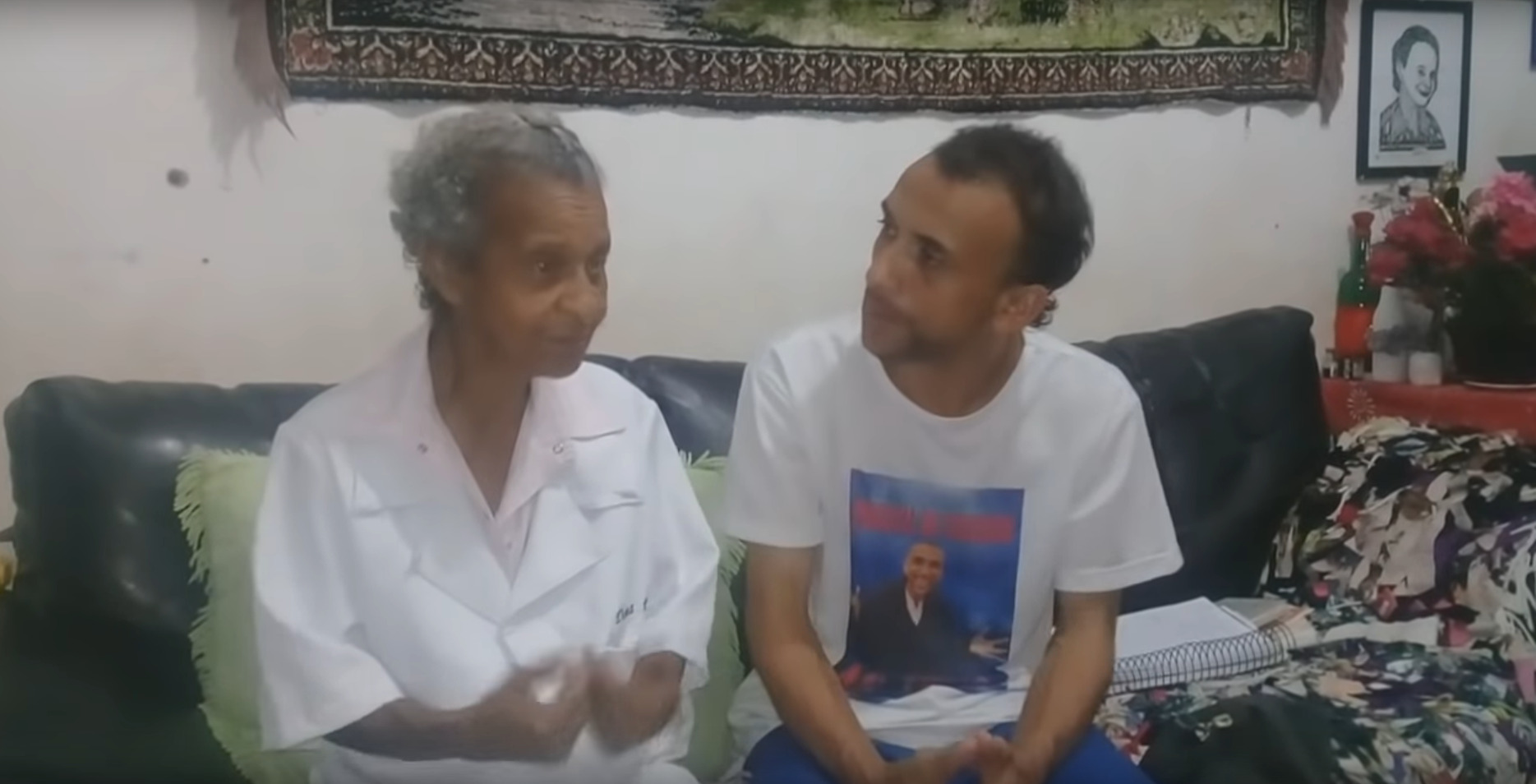
Chiquinho interviewing Dona Piu, the last healer of Sabará, para a TV Muro, em 2018.

== Programming ==
Since its founding, the station operated from 6pm to 10pm on weeknights, as well as on Saturdays after the mass ends.

TV Muro's line-up varies between nine and ten programs, such as news, movies, documentaries, environment, entertainment, public utility and community notes. 2014 was marked by the return of a successful show, Muroletrando, a spelling bee inserted in TV Murinho, the station's children's output, which features the participation of children taking part in the Biblio em Cena theater company, created in 1989 by Chiquinho at the municipal library of Sabará.

Every year with a World Cup, the station airs Copa no Muro, with Chiquinho Galvão and Maria Bueno, known as "Mamãe Bueno", friend of Chiquinho and collaborator at the station. Dressing up in the colors of the national team, both give their predictions, comment the matches with the national team and interview people on the streets. In 2014, the station planned to follow Copa do Muro with Coral das Galinhas, pretending to present a chorus of chickens with rooster Frederico, singing the Brazilian National Anthem. In 2018, its broadcast was made with the camera connected to barbed wire inside Chiquinho's bedroom, in an improvised tripod, with the couple entering with a green cloth during match breaks to comment and predict.

The station also airs Cine Muro, a film and documentary program.

== Productions ==
In 2007, in a partnership with cinema students of Centro Universitário UNA, TV Muro finished producing its documentary Lendas de Sabará, initiating in 2003, with the length of one hour and ten minutes, on the 25 legends that are part of the local imagination, such as the "cotton woman", a ghost which appears on the bathrooms of local schools with cotton in its nose and ears scaring children, the bride of Carmo Cemetery and the "owner of the night", a boy who turns into a man overnight at Igreja Matriz de Nossa Senhora da Conceição.

For a year, Chiquinho told those legents through old inhabitants of the city, also holding theatrical representations of those legents with children. The documentary had a total cost of R$12, released on VHS and CD/DVD formats, with the participation of the entire community, which assisted and participated in the creation of the video.

On Folklore Day upon its completion, the documentary was screened at Cine Bandeirantes, in Sabará.

== Media coverage ==
In 2005, a short film profiling the station was produced, named TV Muro, directed and produced by Fábio de Britto and Simone Lara. The film achieved the award of best video at 8ª Mostra de Cinema de Tiradentes (popular vote) and honorable mention at 13º Festival de Cine Vídeo de Gramado. It also received the Festival dos Festivais de Vídeo award, at 9.º Festival de Cinema, Vídeo e Dcine of Curitiba.

In October 2005 and in 2011, Chiquinho was Ana Maria Braga's guest on Mais Você, where she talked about the station and took part in film projects promoted by the program.

In May 2019, TV Muro's history was a topic on Hora do Faro, hosted by actor and presenter Rodrigo Faro.
