= Otávio Azevedo =

Brazilian engineer

- Born: Otávio Marques de Azevedo; 31 May 1951 (age 75); Belo Horizonte, Minas Gerais, Brazil
- Education: Pontifícia Universidade Católica de Minas Gerais
- Occupations: CEO, Andrade Gutierrez

Otávio Marques de Azevedo (born 31 May 1951) is a Brazilian businessman, and the CEO of Andrade Gutierrez, a Brazilian conglomerate.

Azevedo received a bachelor's degree in Electrical Engineering from Pontifícia Universidade Católica de Minas Gerais.

In June 2015, he was arrested as part of a major investigation into corruption at the state-owned oil company Petrobras.
