= Church of Our Lady of the Rosary of Black Men (Sabará) =

Roman Catholic Church in Minas Gerais, Brazil

Coordinates: 19.8897°S 43.8109°W

The Church of Our Lady of the Rosary of Black Men (Brazilian Portuguese: Igreja de Nossa Senhora do Rosário dos Pretos) in Sabará, Minas Gerais, Brazil, is a Roman Catholic church whose construction was initiated in the 18th century and interrupted towards the end of the 19th century. The building is listed by the National Institute of Historic and Artistic Heritage of Brazil (IPHAN) and is characterized mainly by having an internal chapel, made of earth and wood, inside of a larger and unfinished building made of stone.

== History ==
The brotherhood of Our Lady of the Rosary of Black Men was founded in Sabará by slaves in 1713, a few years after the establishment of the village. In that year, a small chapel made of earth and wood was built, supposed to be provisional. In 1757, the brotherhood received land adjacent to the chapel to build a larger church, and work that began in 1767. The chapel was kept while work on the church began around it, with the plan that, once the church was concluded, the inner chapel would be dismantled.

The work began and was interrupted several times, usually due to lack of resources. The works were restarted in 1798, 1805, 1819 and, for the last time, in 1856. From this period until 1878, efforts were made to finish the work; however, with the events that resulted in the publication of the Lei Áurea, the law that abolished slavery in Brazil, the black public started to disperse in the territory and the attendance of the church and, therefore, the resources for its finalization, became scarce.

== Architecture ==
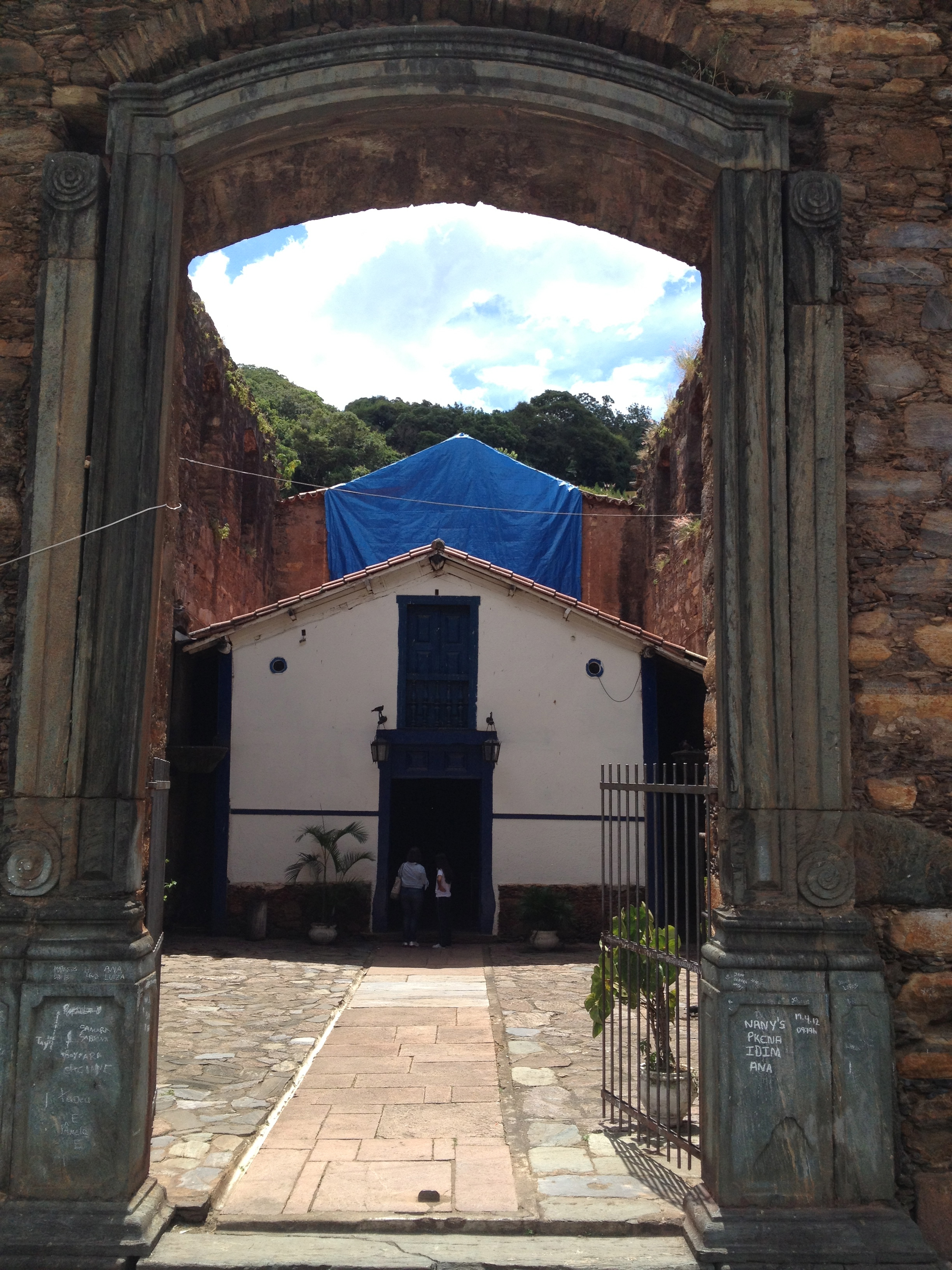
The earth chapel preserved inside of what would become the main church, made of stone

As work on the main church was interrupted before the masonry was finished, the building presents an exceptional opportunity to learn about the construction technology used in buildings of this scale at that time and place. This is an example that illustrates the transition from the use of earth and wood, used in other older religious buildings in Minas Gerais, to the use of lime-coated stone. Such a change stems from the enrichment of the captaincy and the subsequent arrival of artisans from Portugal and the coastal cities that had closer relationships with the metropolis.

== See also ==
- Baroque in Brazil
