= Borba Gato =

Brazilian explorers born 1649

Manuel de Borba Gato
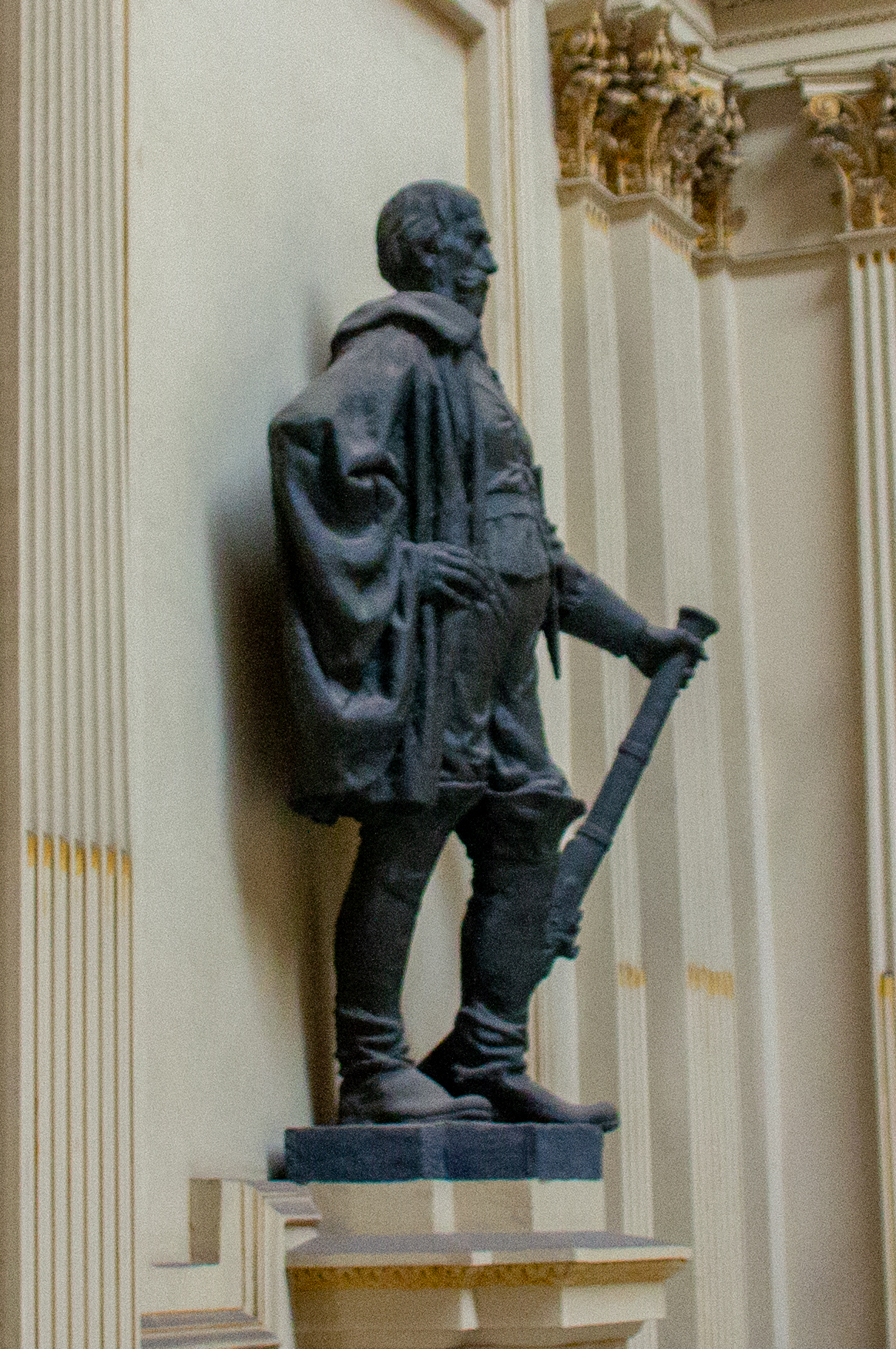
- Bronze statue of Borba Gato by Nicola Rollo, now in the Museu Paulista
- Born: 1649; São Paulo dos Campos de Piratininga, Captaincy of São Vicente, State of Brazil, Kingdom of Portugal
- Died: 1734 (aged 84–85); Sabará, Captaincy of Minas Gerais, State of Brazil, Kingdom of Portugal
- Known for: bandeiras
- Spouse: Maria Leite
- Parents: João de Borba Gato (father); Sebastiana Rodrigues (mother)
- Relatives: Fernão Dias Pais (father-in-law)

Manuel de Borba Gato (São Paulo, 1649 – Sabará, 1734) was a bandeirante in the Captaincy of São Vicente. He began his career with his father-in-law Fernão Dias Pais. When he died in 1718 he held the office of Juiz ordinário of the town of Sabará. It is not known where he is buried, perhaps in the Capela de Santo Antônio or the Capela de Santana in the old town of Sabará, or even, according to various writers, in Paraopeba where he had an estate. Beyond being a discoverer of mines, he was an effective administrator at the end of his life.

In 1695, at Rio das Velhas, Manuel Borba Gato discovered gold, leading to the Brazilian Gold Rush.
