= Odebrecht Foundation =

Private Brazilian institution

The Odebrecht Foundation (Portuguese Fundação Odebrecht) is a private Brazilian institution created in 1965. It was launched by Norberto Odebrecht, a Brazilian engineer and businessman, who in 1944 founded the Odebrecht company, in order to provide company members benefits that the Brazilian Social Security system either did not provide, or only could cover partially.

In 1988 the Odebrecht Foundation began focusing on preparing and grooming adolescents for life due to the realization that adolescence is the period when people consolidate the values and ideas that shape their character.

By 2000, the Odebrecht Foundation’s work in this area had benefited 500,000 adolescents and 12,000 educators in several Brazilian states. That year, while maintaining its focus on the objectives established in 1988, the Foundation began concentrating its efforts on the Brazilian Northeast – more precisely on areas with low human development indexes that were outside the dynamic hubs of the nation’s economy.

The Odebrecht Foundation works in the Southern Bahia lowlands, a region with some of the worst human development indexes and lowest social investments in Brazil. The Foundation concentrates on the program for the Integrated and Sustainable Regional Development of the Southern Bahia lowlands, with a focus on developing its productive, human, social and environmental capital while valuing the concept of the family unit and prioritizing adolescents and their interaction with their families.

The foundation’s actions are focused on the existence of four capitals in communities of any socioeconomic profile:

- Human Capital – quality rural education;
- Social Capital – construction of a more just and unified society;
- Environmental Capital – conservation of natural resources;
- Productive Capital – generation of work and income.
