= Norberto Odebrecht =

Brazilian engineer, businessman and philanthropist (1920-2014)

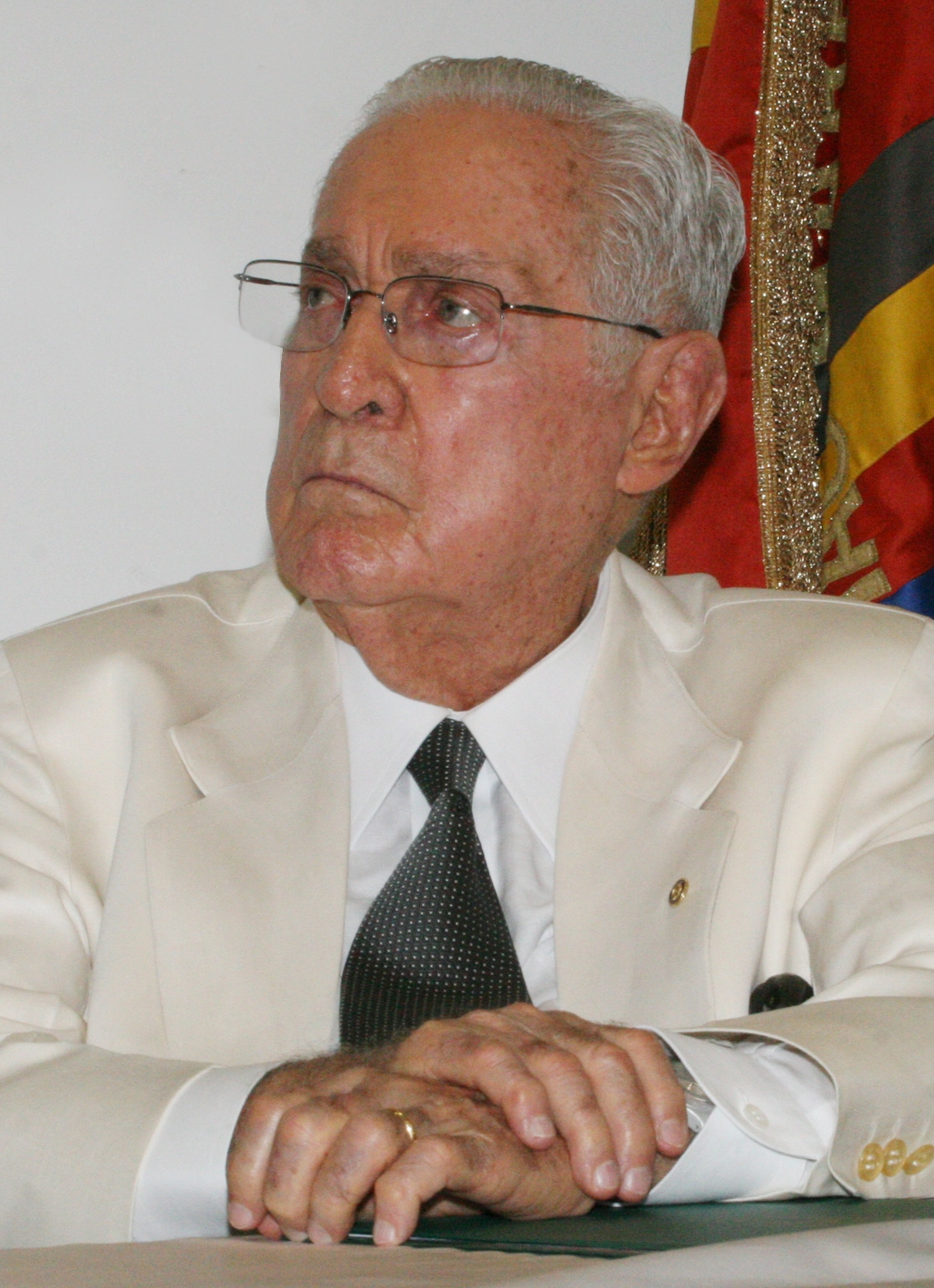
- Norberto Odebrecht in 2010
- Born: October 9, 1920; Recife, Brazil
- Died: July 19, 2014 (aged 93); Salvador, Bahia, Brazil
- Education: Polytechnic School of Bahia
- Occupations: Engineer, Businessman
- Children: Emílio Odebrecht
- Relatives: Marcelo Odebrecht (grandson)

Norberto Odebrecht (Brazilian Portuguese: [noʁˈbɛʁ.tu odɛˈbɾɛ(t)ʃ]; October 9, 1920 – July 19, 2014) was a Brazilian engineer, businessman and philanthropist. He was the founder of Odebrecht.

== Early life ==
Odebrecht was born on October 9, 1920, in Recife, Brazil. He was the son of the pioneer Emílio Odebrecht, Sr. and a grandson of Emil Odebrecht, a German geodetical engineer and cartographer, who emigrated to Brazil in 1856. He studied at the Polytechnic School of Bahia.

== Career ==
Odebrecht founded a construction company from which the Odebrecht Group in Salvador da Bahia was created in 1944. Today, the company has become an international conglomerate and employs more than 167,500 people in over 60 countries.

In 1991, he passed the presidency of Odebrecht to his son Emílio Odebrecht, and remained as chairman.

Norberto Odebrecht's "thoughts" have been compiled in three volumes distributed to all employees of the group.

== Philanthropy ==
Odebrecht was the founder of the Brazilian Odebrecht Foundation (Portuguese: Fundação Odebrecht).

== Death ==
Odebrecht died on 19 July 2014, aged 93, in Salvador, Bahia.
