= Offshore investment =

Relates to the wider financial services industry in offshore centers

Offshore investment is the keeping of money in a jurisdiction other than one's country of residence. Offshore jurisdictions are used to pay less tax in many countries by large and small-scale investors. Poorly regulated offshore domiciles have served historically as havens for tax evasion, money laundering, or to conceal or protect illegally acquired money from law enforcement in the investor's country.

Locations favored by investors for low rates of tax are known as offshore financial centers or (sometimes) tax havens.

Payment of less tax is the driving force behind most 'offshore' activity. Due to the use of offshore centers, investors are able to conduct investment activities in a more profitable fashion. Often, taxes levied by an investor's home country are critical to the profitability of any given investment. Using offshore-domiciled special purpose mechanisms (or vehicles) an investor may reduce the amount of tax payable, allowing the investor to achieve greater profitability overall. Another reason why 'offshore' investment is considered superior to 'onshore' investment is because it is less regulated, and the behavior of the offshore investment provider, whether he be a banker, fund manager, trustee or stock-broker, is freer than it could be in a more regulated environment.

== Vehicles for offshore investment ==
Offshore investing includes investment strategies outside of an investor's home country. Investment opportunities in money-market, bond and equity assets are available through offshore companies.

One may also charter an offshore corporation to provide a legal personality, limited liability, transferable shares, a centralized management, and shared ownership. In some cases the investment advantages of such a corporation are offset by legal, corporate and account registration fees imposed by the country in which the offshore account is established. Further, the officers of the corporation may be required to establish residence, own real estate, or meet an investment minimum (depending upon the country this may range up to $1 million). An advantage which accrues from establishing a corporate structure is that although a citizen may be proscribed from establishing an offshore account, they can establish a corporation that can do so.

== Reasons for offshore investment ==
Motivations for investment offshore include:

- Tax advantages - tax regulations often contain provisions to protect against taxation by multiple jurisdictions which can be exploited for legal tax reductions. Nations intentionally attract business investments through lower tax rates. The corporate-tax trend over the period from 1980 to 2010 has trended lower, with the top rate in OECD countries (excluding America) moving from 51% to 32%. Investing in such an environment can improve the investor's rate of return on investment.
- Investment diversification - risk can be managed by diversifying investments among a wider range of options than are available for onshore investment.
- Avoidance of forced heirship - inheritance may be passed to the preferred heir, regardless of regulations such as community property laws in the jurisdiction of residence/death.
- Lower levels of regulation - a broader range of investment options are available (e.g. hedge funds, which thrive in low regulatory environments due to their highly aggressive investments strategies, thrive in offshore jurisdictions, principally the Cayman Islands)
- Privacy - confidential financial information helps the individual manage taxes on capital gains, income, and inheritance.
- Specialist financial services - the leading offshore centres have highly developed financial services sectors with expertise in stock broking, asset management, banking, insurance, trusts, funds and legal services.
- Safeguarding against currency devaluation - As an example, Chinese investors have been investing their savings in stable Offshore locations to protect their against the decline of the renminbi.

== Arguments against offshore investment ==
Reasons which have been advanced against offshore investment include:

- They bypass security exchange legislation put into place after the Great Depression (e.g., the U.S. Securities Act of 1933 and the Securities Exchange Act of 1934) to stabilize the world's economies and establish a fair marketplace. This increases the risk that the financial markets are not properly regulated, possibly increasing the likelihood of bubbles and subsequent recessions.
- Ethically, it might be considered an abuse of national sovereignty by reducing transparency to regulators of financial transactions. Offshore investments reduce transparency, which abets illegal activities such as allowing investment firms to bypass their fiduciary responsibility and exploit their customers. As an example, it is alleged in a SEC-filed civil fraud suit that Goldman Sachs set up an "offshore deal in which a longtime client, the hedge fund Paulson & Co., helped select and then bet against the securities in the deal without telling investors of Paulson's role."
- It exploits the advantages created to earn wealth by a taxed economy while not paying its fair share of taxes in that economy. Wealth earned in one (taxed) economy is taken out of circulation (i.e., it cannot be taxed again when re-spent to provide services and infrastructure).
- It encourages Tax competition between states, provinces, countries, and regions, in the same way that the search for ever cheaper source of manual labor brings down wages everywhere.
- Offshore investments in poorly regulated tax havens may bypass sanctions against countries established to encourage conventions important to societies (e.g., UN sanctions for failure to adhere to nuclear nonproliferation treaties). This has the effect of undercutting the effectiveness of such sanctions.

== Efforts to reduce use of offshore investment for tax evasion ==
=== International efforts to reduce tax evasion ===
The Organisation for Economic Co-operation and Development (OECD), the European Union (EU) and the United States of America (USA) strive for exchanging tax data. The OECD has established a threshold of bilateral tax-information exchange agreements, twelve, as the minimum which a country is also placed on the “white list” and recognized as having “substantially implemented” internationally agreed tax standards. The OECD “grey list” includes countries which have not achieved “white list” status and are considered as fostering tax evasion through insufficient financial openness. As a result, the Cayman Islands and Liechtenstein implemented financial openness reforms to get off the list and escape the threat of sanctions, while Panama, Luxembourg, Liechtenstein, Switzerland and the British Virgin Islands (BVI) were still on the grey list as of late 2009.

The expansion of the EU has motivated major improvements in tax-related transparency. The EU requires members to exchange tax information using automatic systems by the end of 2011, which assures that Austria, Belgium and Luxembourg are coming into compliance. Further, since January 2007 former tax havens (noted for their banking secrecy and low tax rates for foreign investments) in Bermuda, the Channel Islands (Jersey and Guernsey) and the Isle of Man have achieved “white list” status due to their EU ties.

Panama is currently recognized as one of the more attractive countries for legitimate offshore investment as well as for tax evasion, and is on the OECD “grey list”. Panama's free-trade zone handles over $19 billion in commerce per year and construction is booming. Corporations are easily created in Panama and, although they are heavily taxed on Panama-domestic operations, they pay no taxes on foreign activities. Company ownership can be readily concealed through the use of anonymous “bearer shares”. As a result, more than of 45,000 offshore shell companies and subsidiaries companies are created in Panama each year; Panama has one of the highest concentrations of subsidiaries of any country in the world. Panama's banks are well regulated, providing stability and predictability. Panama does not yet participate in tax-information-exchange treaties; since they tax only domestic income, there is no reciprocal benefit in their sharing information with other governments. All these conditions combine to provide advantages to both legitimate business and to tax evasion.

=== Recent developments ===
In 2009 the USA initiated increased efforts to close taxation loopholes and identify and prosecute tax evaders using offshore accounts. As an element of this effort, they have pursued amended tax treaties to offset the banking secrecy laws of nations such as Switzerland. In 2010 the US and Switzerland agreed to a protocol increasing shared tax information to aid the prosecution of tax evasion. As with all treaties, this does not come into force until ratified by the appropriate legislative bodies (in this case the U.S. Senate and the Swiss Federal Council and Parliament).

As one example of efforts to reduce illegal offshore investments made for the purpose of tax evasion, in 2010 the Swiss bank Union Bank of Switzerland (UBS) has paid a fine of $780 million and is cooperating on identifying the estimated 19,000 wealthy U.S. tax evaders who have accounts in UBS. The US Internal Revenue Service has offered amnesty to those who come forward voluntarily. Similarly the banking firm HSBC has been alleged to have aided two U.S. citizens in a multimillion-dollar tax evasion scheme that relied on various accounts held in the names of foreign shell corporations, using Swiss lawyers to act as cut-out signatories for some of these accounts. The two men were arrested and are under indictment for tax evasion.

== See also ==
- Five Flags Theory
- Flag of convenience
- Offshore bank
- Offshore financial centre
- Offshore fund
- Offshore stock broker
- Paradise Papers
- Tax haven
