= Das Velhas River =

das Velhas River
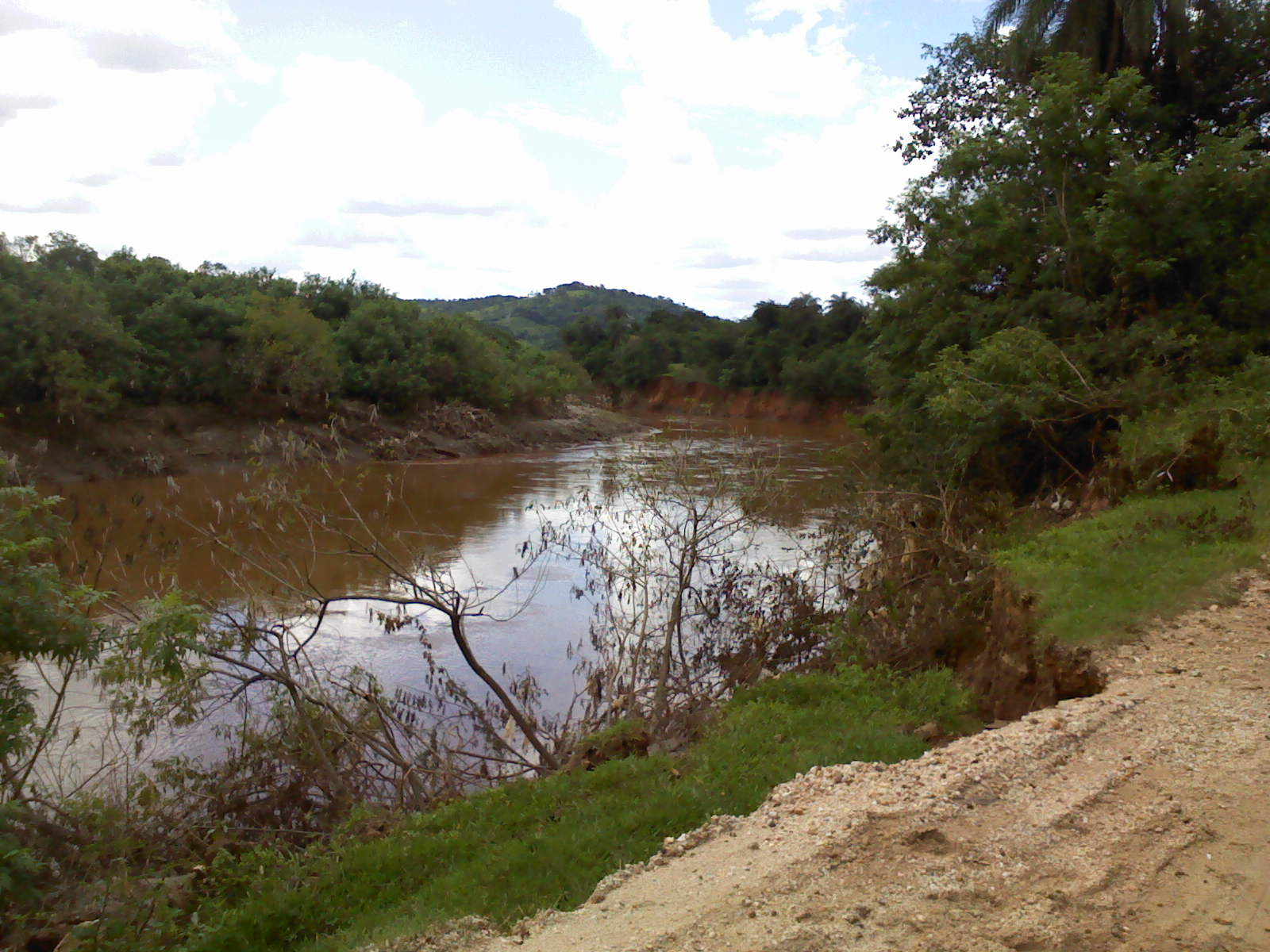

Location
- Country: Brazil
- State: Minas Gerais

Physical characteristics
- Source
  - location: Ouro Preto
- Mouth: São Francisco River
  - coordinates: 17°12′S 44°50′W
- Length: 801 kilometres (498 mi)

The das Velhas River (Portuguese: Rio das Velhas), is the longest tributary of the basin of the São Francisco river. Its water flows into that river at a place called Barra do Guaicuí, in the municipality of Várzea da Palma, Minas Gerais. The source was found to be the Andorinhas waterfall located in the municipality of Ouro Preto.

== Origin of the name ==
According to writer Aníbal Machado, this river is known to the amerindians as Uaimií and by the bandeirantes as Guaicuí, from which the name Barra do Guaicuí for the place where the Das Velhas empties into the São Francisco River. In Tupi "gwaimi" means "old" whereas in Uaimii the final "i" means "river". "Rio das Velhas" means "River of the old women".

== Historic importance ==
The das Velhas river has been of great importance in the development of the central region of Minas Gerais, because it is one of the main roads by which the gold cycle evolved. From its source, the das Velhas River passes through other historical cities in the region, among which Sabará, Santa Luzia, Belo Horizonte etc.

Recent academic research indicates that the das Velhas river could have been the original path to the discovery of gold in Minas Gerais. By this theory, the explorers from the northeast walked along the banks of the São Francisco river and went on along the Das Velhas River. It is a more natural passage but much longer than the road from Rio de Janeiro or São Paulo. Passing through the central region of Minas Gerais, the explorers discovered gold and precious stones. Once found, knowing the approximate places, they swiftly went through the rough terrain of the mountains by a much shorter but much more difficult and dangerous route. The dispute over the existing mines led to the War of the Emboabas, at the end of which the Minas Gerais region became a captaincy administered directly by the Portuguese crown.

== Present situation ==
In the metropolitan region of Belo Horizonte, the Das Velhas river suffered a series of setbacks. A sizable part of the water volume is captured by the Water Treatment Station Agua de Bela Fama. Behind the station the river receives a great quantity of sewage from the Arrudas and Onça streams, both crossing the city of Belo Horizonte. The result is that the das Velhas River in its best known stretch is a river with yellow water (mostly caused by the iron present in the region's soil), extremely polluted and acid. There is practically no life in the water of the river along that stretch.

Because of the historic and environmental importance the Manuelzão project was initiated in 1997 by the Medical Faculty of the University of Minas Gerais, with the goal of finding a way to bring back life in the basin of the Das Velhas. The project initialised a series of goals to sensibilise the public opinion, which will result through the embellishment of public, municipal and state policies. In particular rigorous controls of pollution emitters are important. The project has the ambitious goal of having the Das Velhas river revitalised by the year 2010.

The 31,270 hectares (77,300 acres) Serra do Gandarela National Park was created in 2014 in an effort to protect the water supplying the river, and thus the Belo Horizonte water supply.
