= Andrade Gutierrez =

Brazilian multinational conglomerate

Andrade Gutierrez S.A.
- Type: Private
- Industry: Conglomerate
- Founded: Belo Horizonte, Minas Gerais, Brazil (September 2, 1948)
- Founder: Gabriel Donato de Andrade, Roberto Andrade e Flávio Gutierrez
- Headquarters: Belo Horizonte, Brazil
- Key people: Ricardo Sena, (CEO)
- Products: Engineering and construction, Telecommunications, Energy, Concessions, Airports, Roads, Sanitation
- Revenue: ▲US$ 2.308,4 billion (2012)
- Net income: R$ 16,8 billion (2012)
- Number of employees: 223,000
- Website: www.andradegutierrez.com

Andrade Gutierrez is a Brazilian private multinational conglomerate headquartered in Belo Horizonte. The company was founded in 1948, in Belo Horizonte, Minas Gerais by the Andrade and Gutierrez families. As of 2013, Andrade Gutierrez is the second largest construction company in Brazil, with over a thousand projects carried out domestically and globally. It has branches in 44 countries and a net income of 8 billion BRL.

Andrade Gutierrez has three separate divisions: AG Engenharia (Construtora Andrade Gutierrez), which engages in engineering and construction; AG Concessões, which handles public projects, concessions and utilities; and AG Telecom, which provides telecommunication services. Ricardo Sena serves as president of Andrade Gutierrez.

== History ==
=== Early history ===
Andrade Gutierrez founded on September 2, 1948, in Belo Horizonte, Minas Gerais, by three engineers: Gabriel and Roberto Andrade and their friend Flávio Gutierrez. It began as Andrade Gutierrez S.A., a small construction company. The company constructed its first interstate engineering work, the Rio de Janeiro-Belo Horizonte highway, in the 1950s. It also participated on the construction of the Castelo Branco highway, in São Paulo. Castelo Branco later became a reference of highway engineering.

In the late 1950s, the company benefited from the modernization plans of the president Juscelino Kubitschek, and it expanded its area of operation to different Brazil states. In the 1960s, the group built the Manaus-Porto Velho road, which spans 850 kilometers.

In the 1970s, Andrade Gutierrez built the Itaipu Hydroelectric Power Plant one of the greatest hydroelectric power plants of the world.

=== Expansion during the 1980s ===
In the 1980s, during the "lost decade", Andrade Gutierrez expanded its area of performance within Brazil and into the international market. The company's international expansion focused primarily on Latin America, Africa and Europe. AG built its first international road in 1987. The road spanned 120 kilometers and connected the cities Epena, Impfondo and Dongou, all of which are located in the Republic of the Congo.

Andrade Gutierrez's first work in Latin America was a 150-kilometer stretch of the Chimoré-Yapacani road in Bolivia for the Servicio Nacional de Caminos. Following Andrade Gutierrez's work in Bolivia, the company completed projects in Central America, including the Nassau International Airport in the Bahamas.

In 1987, Andrade Gutierrez bought Zagope, a Portuguese company. Through its Zagope subsidiary, the company built roads, bridges and viaducts in Portugal and Mauritania. The company was also responsible for the extension of the Lisbon subway, which started in 1992. Zagope is one of the most important companies in Portugal.

Andrade Gutierrez also expanded its domestic operations during the 1980s. Projects the company completed during the 1980s include the Confins International Airport located in Minas Gerais, the Lagoinha tunnel in Belo Horizonte and the canalization of the Ribeirão Arrudas. Andrade Gutierrez also constructed the Carajás railroad, which spans 892 kilometers and connects Maranhão and Pará.

=== Diversification in the 1990s ===
The company started to diversify its portfolio in the 1990s, when it expanded into public concessions and telecommunication.

Andrade Gutierrez's industrial business unit achieved its first Brazilian engineering work, the Duque de Caxias Refinery (Reduc), and began a partnership with Petrobras. The company's first concession was with the CCR (Highway Concessions Company), which became the biggest controller of highways under concession in Latin America.

Andrade Gutierrez entered the telecommunications market with the creation of AG Telecom in 1993. In 1998, the company won the auction for the privatization of Telebrás and integrated the operation of Telemar, which was renamed Oi in 2006. The company later founded Contax, one of the three largest contact center companies in the world.

Andrade Gutierrez relocated to Argentina in 1996, where it keeps its infrastructure undertakings.

== Operations ==
Andrade Gutierrez's African operations are focused on Mozambique, Angola, Nigeria, Ghana, Equatorial Guinea, the Congo Republic and Algeria. The company's Latin American operations are focused in Colombia, Peru and Venezuela.

Its projects include hydroelectric power plants, thermoelectric power plants, nuclear power plants, petrochemical plants, mining, steel industry, refineries, harbors, subways, sanitation and urbanization, airports, railroads, and civil engineering. Globally, the company focuses on mining, harbors, logistic terminals, highways, and industrial plant projects (such as steel and petrochemical).

== Corporate Structure ==
The company consists of a Board of Directors including the main company executives. Below are 5 market committees that assist the Group in making strategic decisions.

Above governance, there is the Council of Shareholders, which is formed by both Andrade and Gutierrez families.

Both Andrade and Gutierrez families divide the company's social capital in three equal parts, and each family has a company linked to the group.

=== Divisions ===
==== Engineering and construction ====
In the engineering segment, AG operates in the construction of hydroelectric power plants, thermoelectric power plants, nuclear power plants, petrochemical plants, mining, steel industry, refineries, harbors, subways, sanitation and urbanization, airports, railroads, civil engineering.

In July 2013, Andrade Gutierrez began constructing the Serra do Sul mine in Pará, Brazil for the Vale mining company. The mine is planned to be the biggest in Vale's history. Vale signed three contracts with AG, a total of R$2.3 billion, for the construction of the mine, S11D, in Carajás. The three contracts involve the construction of two railroad branches of 50 kilometers and a processing plant with capacity of 90 million tons of steel per year.

In 2008, Andrade Gutierrez won a contract for the construction of the Jose Inacio Abreu e Lima's National Steel Company, in Piar Municipality, Bolívar, Venezuela. The steel plant's planned productive capacity is1.5 million tons of liquid steel per year. The same year, Andrade Gutierrez was awarded a contract for the AstiAlba Shipyard, located on the Araya Peninsula in Sucre, Venezuela. The shipyard is designed to allow PDVSA to manufacture and repair oil tankers. In 2012, Andrade Gutierrez won an additional contract to construct the Thermoelectric Plant of Cumaná, which is also located in Sucre. The plant has a planned capacity of 760 megawatts, which will contribute to the electric power generation of the eastern region of the country.

Based in Lisbon, Portugal, Zagope is responsible for Andrade Gutierrez's activities in Europe, Asia, Africa and the Middle East. With around 8000 employees, Zagope is the biggest exporter and employer of the construction sector in Portugal, ranked 3rd largest construction company and 4th largest company in Portugal. The subsidiary's volume of business went from €160 million in 2004 to €506 million in 2011.

Reaching the number of about 5.000 employees, in late 2014, Zagope became Andrade Gutierrez Europe, Africa, Asia. The change intended to endorse their position as a global and unified group also in the European, African and Asian markets.

The company, which is present in over 12 countries, was responsible for the expansion of the runway at Funchal Airport in Madeira Islands.

In Algeria, the AG Europe, Africa, Asia is responsible for the Viaduct Transrhumel in the city of Constantine, considered one of the country's largest transport projects. In Angola, AG EAA is involved with infrastructure services in the provinces of Huíla, Luanda and Cubango.

==== AG Concessions ====
Created in 1999, AG Concessions is a sub-holding of the Andrade Gutierrez group. The division was founded following Andrade Gutierrez's experiences with public service concessions throughout the 1990s. AG Concessions operates both domestically and internationally and focuses on infrastructure concessions.

The division operates in the transport and logistics areas via CCR; energy with Cemig and Santo Antônio Energia; sanitation through Sanepar; telecommunication via Oi and Contax; health with Logimed and Novo Metropolitano (Barreiro's Metropolitan Hospital), in Belo Horizonte; and sports arenas via Brio, which is responsible for the modernization of Beira-Rio Stadium. In 2012, AG Concessions had a gross operating revenue of R$5.146.

AG Concessions takes part in the administration of many Brazilian roads, including Rodovia Presidente Dutra, Rodovia Anhanguera and Rodovia Castelo Branco.

==== AG Private E&C ====
In 2012, the Andrade Gutierrez group restructured itself internally and created AG Private E&C, a specific division to take care of the provision of service contracts for private initiatives. In the same year, the contracts yielded earnings of R$300 million. In 2013, AG Private E&C reached R$2.3 billion with the signing of Vale's S11D contract mining contract in Carajás.

The president of AG Private E&C is Ricardo Sá.

AG Private E&C focuses mainly in multinational corporations, but also shows interest in mining projects, ports & harbors, food & beverages, logistics terminals, roads, industrial plants and high-tech infrastructure.

==== Energy generation ====
Andrade Gutierrez entered the energy sector with the Santo Antônio Energia consortium. The consortium is responsible for the construction and operation of the Santo Antônio Hydroelectric Plant, located at Madeira river, in Rondônia. It's also responsible for the commercialization of the generated energy. The hydroelectric plant of Santo Antônio is a result of the Growth Acceleration Program (PAC) of the federal government, and consists of 50 turbine generators with a total capacity of 3,568 MW of power generation.

In 2014, Cemig GT increased by 10% its stakes in Santo Antônio Energia after acquiring 83% of the total capital and 49% of the shares of SAAG Investmentos, managed by Andrade Gutierrez Participações. The structure of the transaction took place through participation investment funds, such as the FIP Melbourne, in which Cemig GT – along with pension funds – invests. The acquisition price was 835.3 million BRL. The participation of Cemig in Santo Antônio Energia increased to 18.05%.

In 2010, Andrade Gutierrez became the owner of 33% of the voting capital of CEMIG, a state-owned company that is chaired by Djalma Bastos de Morais. AGC Energy, subsidiary company of AG, took on the debt of Southern Electric Brasil (SEB), owner of the shares, for R$2.1 billion. From the total, R$500 million was paid in cash.

==== Basic Sanitation ====
The AG Concessões started in the basic sanitation sector through the Domino Holdings. They joined as a shareholder of the Paraná Sanitation Company (Sanepar), and later on, in Water Port, which operates in the water and sewage system in the Port of Santos.

In April 2014, AG terminated the Water Port contract with the Society of São Paulo State Dock (Codesp).

==== Telecommunications ====
In 1993, AG created AG Telecom and in July 1998, the company bought, via the Telemar consortium, Oi.

In 2008, Oi bought Brasil Telecom. AG Telecom's business portfolio includes Oi, Oi Internet, Way Brasil (regional paid TV operator) and Contax.

=== International operations ===
Andrade Gutierrez Group began its international operations in the 1980s, mainly in South America, Africa and Europe.

Internationally, AG has operated in projects like the New International Airport of Quito, in Ecuador, the Inter-oceanic roads South and North, in Peru, and the Bulwark Presidio dam, in Mexico. In Europe, the Tejo Passage and the Burata-Ourense tunnel in Spain. Notable African projects include, the Boussiaba dam in Algeria, the Luanda-Viana highway and Mongomeyen Airport in Equatorial Guinea stood out.

==== Main works ====
Interoceanica Sur – Peru Siderúrgica Nacional de Venezuela – Venezuela Rio Colocaro Potash Project – Argentina

== Employment generation ==
The Andrade Gutierrez group currently generates 207,209 direct employments. From this total, 61,064 employees are hired for the Group's business units. The other 146,255 employees work for the companies owned by AGSA. Aside from that, there are 1,798 interns and trainees and the Group generates 178,167 outsourced jobs.

== Main works in Brazil ==
- Remodeling of Estádio Gigante da Beira-Rio (RS)
- Maracanã (RJ) - Reforma
- Remodeling of Mané Garrincha's Stadium (DF)
- Amazon Arena (AM)
- Santo Antonio's Hydroelectric Power Plant (RO)
- São Paulo' Plateau Refinery (SP)
- Urbanization of Manguinhos (RJ)
- Pipeline between Coari and Manaus (AM)
- Simplício Hydroelectric Power Plant (RJ)
- Gabriel Passos Refinery (MG)
- Mario Covas Rodoanel Highway (SP)
- President Tancredo Neves Administrative City (MG)
- Containers Terminal Yard of Santos Harbor (SP)
- North-South Railroad (GO) (TO)
- Balbina Hydroelectric Power Plant (AM)
- Itaipu Hydroelectric Power Plant (PR)
- Castanhão Dam Wall (CE)
- Tubarão Steel Company - Alto Forno 3 (ES)
- Duque de Caxias Refinery - HDT Unit (RJ)
- Alberto Pasqualini Refinery (RS)
- Grande Carajás Project - Iron Mining Plant (PA)
- Salvador's Subway (BA)
- Brasília's Subway (DF)
- Steel Railroad (MG)
- Belo Horizonte's Subway (MG)
- Carajás Railroad (PA)
- São Paulo's Subway (SP)
- Pecém Harbor (CE)
- Rio Grande Harbor (RS)
- BR-319 Highway (AM-RR)
- President Dutra Highway (RJ)
- Dom Pedro I Highway (SP)
- Ayrton Senna Highway (SP)
- Bandeirantes Highway (SP)
- Marechal Rondon Highway (SP)
- Angra III Nuclear Power Plant (RJ)
- Electricity Transmission Line between Oriximiná and Manaus (PA-MA)
- Belo Monte Hydroelectric Power Plant – (PA)
- TransCarioca (RJ)
- Olímpico Park (RJ)

== See also ==
- List of scandals in Brazil
