= Odebrecht =

Brazilian company involved in a corruption scandal in Latin America

Novonor
- Type: Private
- Industry: Conglomerate
- Founded: 1944
- Founders: Norberto Odebrecht
- Headquarters: Salvador, Bahia, Brazil; São Paulo, São Paulo, Brazil
- Key people: Héctor Núñez (CEO); Mauricio Odebrecht (chairman)
- Products: Construction, engineering, aerospace, environmental engineering, petrochemicals, chemicals, utilities, ethanol, real estate, infrastructure, defense, transportation, and others
- Revenue: ▲ R$75.9 billion (2023)
- Net income: ▲US$207.6 million (2017)
- Number of employees: 23.000in 2023
- Parent: Construtora Norberto Odebrecht S.A.
- Subsidiaries: Construtora Norberto Odebrecht; Odebrecht Oil and Gas; Foz do Brasil; Odebrecht Realizações Imobiliárias; Odebrecht Infraestrutura; Odebrecht Agroindustrial, Braskem; Odebrecht Administradora E Corretora De Seguros; Odeprev Odebrecht Previdência; Odebrecht USA; Odebrecht Foundation; Mectron; Odebrecht Energia
- Website: www.novonor.com

Novonor, formerly Odebrecht S.A. (Portuguese: [odɛˈbɾɛ(t)ʃ]), is a Brazilian conglomerate, headquartered in Salvador, Bahia, Brazil, consisting of diversified businesses in the fields of engineering, construction, chemicals and petrochemicals. The company was founded in 1944 in Salvador by Norberto Odebrecht, and is active in the Americas, the Caribbean, Africa, Europe and the Middle East. Its leading company is Norberto Odebrecht Construtora.

Odebrecht S.A. is a holding company for Construtora Norberto Odebrecht S.A., the biggest engineering and contracting company in Latin America, and Braskem, the largest petrochemicals producer in Latin America and one of Brazil's five largest private-sector manufacturing companies. Odebrecht controls Braskem, which by revenue is the fourth largest petrochemical company in the Americas and the seventeenth in the world.

The name Odebrecht has become shorthand for an unprecedented regional bribery scandal. Between 2001 and 2016, Odebrecht paid US$788 million in bribes across Latin America. Odebrecht has also been central to the Operation Car Wash scandal. On 19 June 2015, Brazilian authorities arrested the former CEO, Marcelo Odebrecht, in connection with their ongoing probe into bribes paid to the Brazilian oil giant, Petrobras. On 7 March 2016, he was sentenced to 19 years and 4 months jail, for paying over US$30 million in bribes to executives of Petrobras, in exchange for contracts and influence. That year, the U.S. Department of Justice fined the company $2.6 billion in what was the largest corruption case ever prosecuted under the US Foreign Corrupt Practices Act.

In June 2019, the group filed for bankruptcy, seeking to restructure US$13 billion in debt. They eventually filed for Chapter 15 bankruptcy just two months later on August 26, 2019. The group changed its name to Novonor in December 2020.

In July 2022, an agreement between Novonor and Marcelo Odebrecht was signed, with the agreement, Marcelo ceases to be a shareholder in the company and ends a legal battle that started in 2020.

== Timeline ==
Norberto Odebrecht Construtora Ltda., the privately owned precursor to Odebrecht S.A, was founded in 1944 by Norberto Odebrecht. In the late 1970s and early 80s, Odebrecht began to expand internationally and diversify its business. In 1980, CBPO, another Brazilian contractor, merged with Odebrecht, and in 1981, Odebrecht S.A. was created. In 2002, Odebrecht established Braskem, a petrochemical company that went on to become Latin America's largest. In 2007, Odebrecht Agroindustrial was established to produce ethanol, sugar, and energy.

== Corporate structures ==
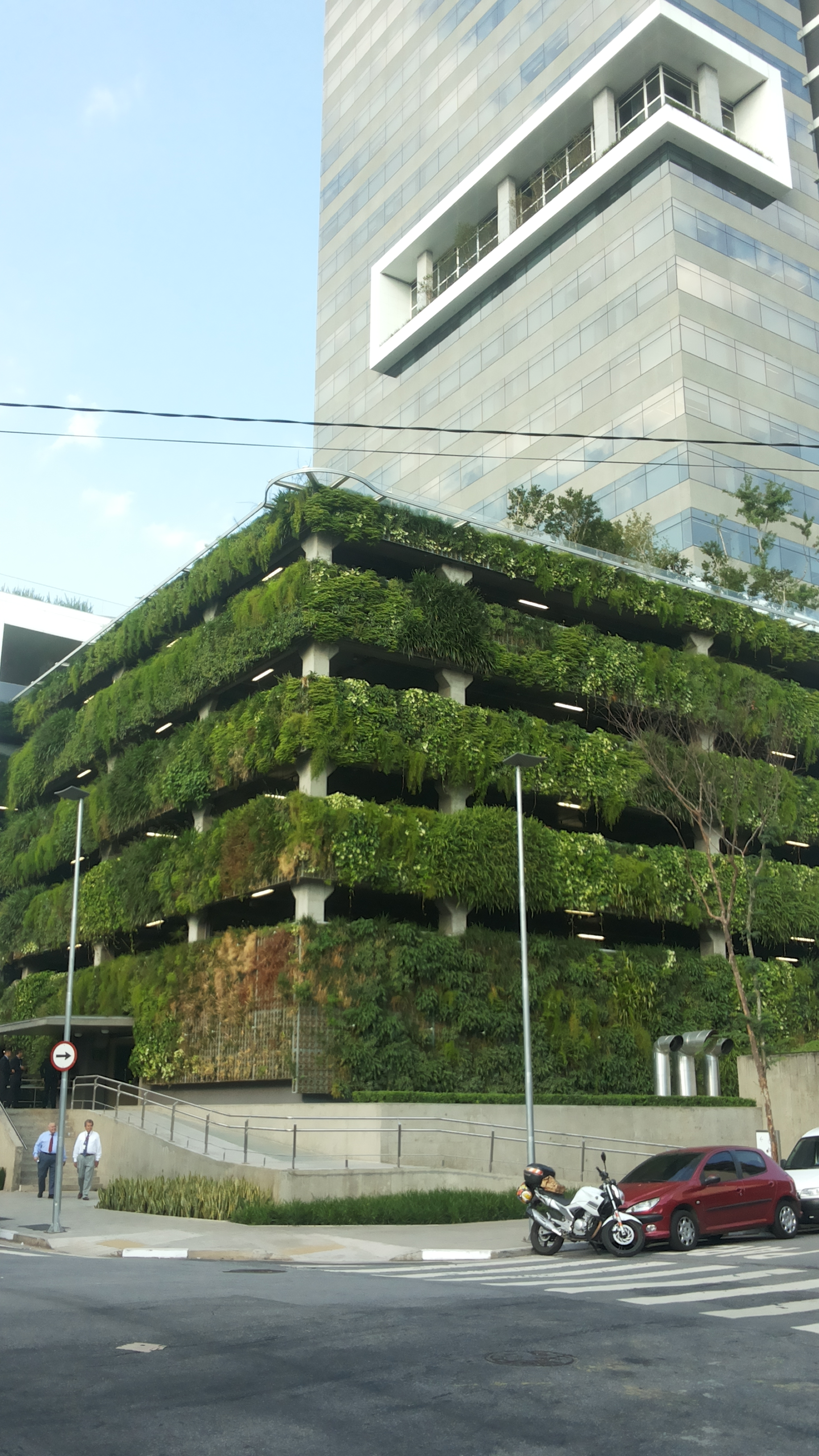
Odebrecht headquarters in São Paulo.

- Odebrecht Energia (energy) – Invests, constructs and manages projects in the Latin American electric sector, such as hydroelectric, thermoelectric and nuclear power plants. Emphasis is made on projects in Brazil, Peru and Colombia.
- Odebrecht Engenharia Industrial (industrial engineering) – Constructs and assembles industrial facilities in Brazil and abroad, serving clients from a range of different sectors.
- Odebrecht Infraestrutura (infrastructure) – Completes important projects in the transport, sanitation, sports arena and irrigation sectors in Brazil.
- Odebrecht América Latina & Angola (Latin America and Angola) – Leads investments and construction projects in regions that served as the pioneers for Odebrecht's international expansion.
- Odebrecht Venezuela – Invests and completes projects in the infrastructure, real estate, industrial, oil and gas, petrochemical and food security sectors in the country.
- Odebrecht International – Includes operations of 65 different nationalities, maintaining a unique quality standard and respecting the unique characteristics of each region.
- Odebrecht Óleo e Gás S.A. (oil and gas) – Explores and produces oil and gas fields, operates rigs and provides integrated services for other companies from the sector.
- Odebrecht Realizações Imobiliárias S.A. (real estate developments) – Develops residential, business, commercial and tourism ventures.
- Foz do Brasil S.A. – Provides water supply and waste treatment services.
- Odebrecht Agroindustrial S.A. – Produces alcohol fuel (ethanol), electricity and sugar using sugarcane.
- Braskem S.A. – Produces raw materials in an integrated fashion, including ethane, propane and chlorine, as well as second-generation petrochemical products, such as thermoplastic resins.
- Odebrecht Participações e Investimentos – Leads the company's operations in diversified infrastructure sectors, investing in transportation and logistics, energy, sports arenas and irrigation.
- Odebrecht Administradora e Corretora de Seguros Ltda. – Protects the assets of shareholders by identifying, mitigating and managing risks.
- Odeprev – Designs and operates supplementary pension plans for Odebrecht Organization members, preparing them for retirement.
- Fundação Odebrecht (foundation) – Promotes youths' education for life, through work and for values, as well as the sustainable development of productive chains.

== Legal problems ==
The Treasurer of the Brazilian Workers' Party, João Vaccari Neto, was arrested in 2015 for allegedly receiving "irregular donations", and José Dirceu, former chief of staff for President Luiz Inácio Lula da Silva, was arrested for orchestrating a large part of the scandal, also in 2015.

Speaker of the Chamber of Deputies (lower house of the Congress of Brazil) Eduardo Cunha (PMDB-RJ), was investigated for allegedly receiving more than US$40 million in kickbacks and bribes. He was imprisoned in October 2016 and his accounts frozen. Former Minister of Mines and Energy Edison Lobão (PMDB) was investigated for receiving more than US$50 million in bribes from Petrobras and arrested 19 October 2016 and held in custody due to what the justice department of Paraná state called "a concrete possibility of flight given his access to hidden resources abroad, as well as double nationality."

In February 2016, amidst the Peruvian presidential race, a report from the Brazilian Federal Police implicated Peruvian president Ollanta Humala as a recipient of bribes from Odebrecht in exchange for public works contracts. Humala rejected the accusation and avoided any confrontation with the media on the matter. Under the Humala administration Odebrecht received contracts worth US$152 million, in addition to the $7.3 billion Southern Gas Pipeline project and $60 million in contracts with regional governments in Peru.

On 4 March 2016, then former Brazilian President Luiz Inácio Lula da Silva was detained and questioned as part of a huge fraud inquiry into the state oil company Petrobras after his house was raided by federal police agents. Lula, who left office in 2011, denied allegations of corruption. The long-running inquiry known as Operation Car Wash, probed accusations of corruption and money laundering at Petrobras. Dozens of executives and politicians were arrested or investigated on suspicion of overcharging on contracts with Petrobras and kicking back part of the money for bribes and electoral campaign donations. Police said they had evidence that Lula, 70, received illicit benefits from the kickback scheme. Lula's institute said in a statement that "violence" against the former president was "arbitrary, illegal and unjustifiable", as he had been co-operating with the investigations. Lula was charged with money laundering and corruption and after his appeal was unsuccessful was arrested in 2018. He would later be released in November 2019 by a Supreme Federal Court ruling.

According to a 2021 study, "Odebrecht paid bribes for two reasons: to tailor the terms of the auction in its favor, as well as to obtain favorable terms in contract renegotiations. In projects where Odebrecht paid bribes, costs increased by 70.8 percent on average, compared with 5.6 percent for projects with no bribes. We also find that bribes and profits made from bribing were smaller than documented in most previous studies, in the range of one to two percent of the cost of a project."

Marcelo Odebrecht has been released from prison, his original sentence of 19 years was reduced to 10 years in 2016 after he admitted guilt and showed evidence.[48] In April 2022, his sentence was reduced to 7 1/2 years in jail, and he was freed of legal restrictions by the end of 2022.[49] He was released in 2017 and moved to house arrest as part of a leniency deal.[50]

=== Other politicians involved ===
==== Antigua and Barbuda ====
They run RPA SU MADR at the Executives running Odebrecht's bribery division secretly bought a majority share of Meinl Bank and used it to transfer funds to politicians' offshore accounts. Prime Minister Gaston Browne denied receiving a bribe from Odebrecht in January 2016.

==== Argentina ====
- Gustavo Arribas, director of Argentina's Federal Intelligence Agency under the government of Mauricio Macri.

==== Colombia ====
- Juan Manuel Santos, Colombian president.
- Gabriel García, former Colombian minister of Transportation during the government of Álvaro Uribe."The attorney general has evidence that Mr. Garcia sought payment of $6.5 million to guarantee that Odebrecht was the company chosen for the Ruta del Sol Dos, excluding other competitors," attorney general Nestor Humberto Martinez told reporters.
- Óscar Iván Zuluaga, former Colombian minister of Finance during the government of Álvaro Uribe.

==== Dominican Republic ====
At least $92 million of the bribes Odebrecht has admitted making were paid in the Dominican Republic, and 14 people were charged with bribery or money laundering. The Dominican Republic announced in February $184 million in fines — twice the amount of its illicit payments to win public works contracts between 2001 and 2014.

==== Ecuador ====
- Rafael Correa former president of Ecuador, 2007–2017. Sentenced to eight years of prison on April 7, 2020.
- Jorge Glas, former vice president of Ecuador. Sentenced to eight years of prison on April 7, 2020.
- Mauricio Rodas, Mayor of Quito (Ecuador) and leader of the SUMA party.

==== Guatemala ====
- Alejandro Sinibaldi, former minister of Transports.
- Manuel Baldizón, former deputy of Congress.

==== Mexico ====
- Enrique Peña Nieto, Mexican president.
- An Odebrecht employee told a Brazilian court that he had been asked to pay a bribe to Emilio Lozoya Austin, then head of the Mexican state-owned oil company PEMEX.

==== Panama ====
The attorney-general of Panama has announced that 43 people suspected of involvement in the bribery scandal. Odebrecht is the largest government contractor in Panama, with contracts over 500 million, including a subway line in Panama City.

==== Peru ====
- Alejandro Toledo, former Peruvian president. Peru requested his extradition from the United States on charges of accepting $20 million in Odebrecht bribes.
- Ollanta Humala and Nadine Heredia, former Peruvian president and former Peruvian first lady, who have been detained for up to 18 months in connection with this scandal.
- Pedro Pablo Kuczynski, Peru's president from 2016 to 2018, who in December 2017 appeared before Congress to defend himself against impeachment over allegations of covering up illegal payments of $782m from Brazilian construction giant Odebrecht to Kuczynski's company Westfield Capital Ltd. Keiko Fujimori, who lost the 2016 presidential elections by a margin of fewer than 50,000 votes, is championing the motion; her party has already forced out five government ministers. He resigned from his position on 22 March due to a scandal of bribing people to not vote for his vacancy for receiving money from Odebrecht.
- Keiko Fujimori, daughter of the now-imprisoned ex president Alberto Fujimori, was detained in October 2018 for implicating herself into the already corrupt scandal. She was put on pretrial detention, and was eventually released.
- Alan Garcia, former Peruvian president. Garcia committed suicide on April 17, 2019.

==== Venezuela ====
- Nicolás Maduro, President of Venezuela.
- Henrique Capriles, opposition candidate at the 2012 and 2013 presidential elections.

==== Uruguay ====
- Maya Cikurel Spiller, partner of Pablo Da Silveira, Uruguay's Culture and Education Minister under the government of Luis Lacalle Pou.

== Paradise Papers ==
On 5 November 2017, the Paradise Papers, a set of confidential electronic documents relating to offshore investment, revealed that Appleby managed 17 offshore companies for Odebrecht and at least one of them was used as a vehicle for the payment of bribes in Operation Car Wash. Some of these offshore companies are publicly known to operate for Odebrecht in Africa and be involved in bribes. Among those involved in the operation who are named in the papers are Marcelo Odebrecht, his father Emílio Odebrecht, and his brother Maurício Odebrecht.

== Odebrecht case ==
The Odebrecht Case is one of the largest corruption cases in recent Latin American history, spanning more than 30 years. It is based on an investigation by the United States Department of Justice, along with 10 other Latin American countries, into the company. This investigation detailed how Odebrecht would have made bribes to presidents, former presidents and government officials of 12 countries: Angola, Argentina, Brazil, Colombia, Ecuador, United States, Guatemala, Mexico, Mozambique, Panama, Peru, Dominican Republic and Venezuela, during the last 20 years, to obtain benefits in public contracting.

== Rankings ==
2009 Engineering News-Record magazine rankings

- No. 18 The Top 225 International Contractors
- No. 34 The Top 225 Global Contractors
- No. 1 Hydro Plants
- No. 4 Sewerage and Solid Waste
- No. 4 Water Supply
- No. 1 Sanitary and Storm Sewers
- No. 5 Pipelines
- No. 5 Water Treatment and Desalinization
- No. 12 Transportation
- No. 5 Bridges
- No. 7 Highways
- No. 9 Mass Transit
- No. 6 Airports

== Notable projects ==
USA

- Adrienne Arsht Center for the Performing Arts
- American Airlines Arena
- Florida International University Stadium
- Garcon Point Bridge
- I-40 Interchange
- Merrill P. Barber Bridge
- Miami Metromover
- MIA Mover APM System
- Miami International Airport – north and south terminals, concourse A and E, FAA traffic control tower, Dolphin parking garage, cargo buildings
- Miami Metrorail Miami Intermodal Center-Earlington Heights Connector (in progress)
- Orlando International Airport – north taxiway and south terminal
- Ritz Carlton Hotel, Key Biscayne
- Seven Oaks Dam
- SR 826 Palmetto

Peru

- Limón Dam
