= Raposos =

- Municipality
- Municipality of Raposos
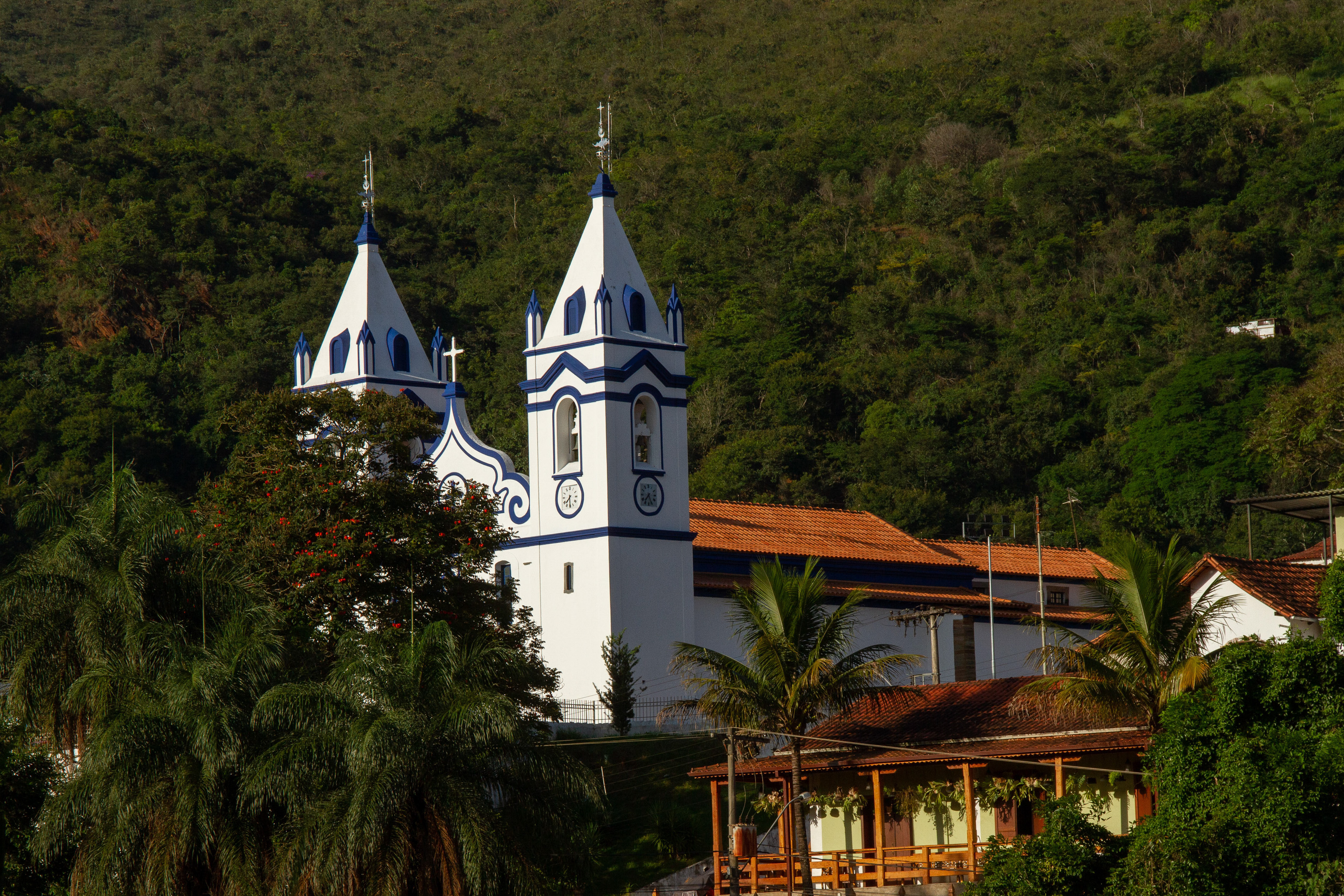
- Igreja de Nossa Senhora da Conceição

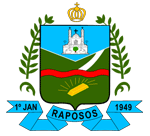
- Flag Coat of arms

- Location of Raposos within Minas Gerais
- Coordinates: 19°58′01″S 43°48′14″W
- Country: Brazil
- State: Minas Gerais

Population (2022 Census)
  - Total: 16,279
  - Estimate (2025): 16,796
- Time zone: UTC−3 (BRT)

Raposos is a Brazilian municipality located in the state of Minas Gerais. The city belongs to the mesoregion Metropolitana de Belo Horizonte and to the microregion of Belo Horizonte.

== Geography ==
The municipality contains the Raposos gold mines opened by the Saint John d'El Rey Mining Company around 1910. As of 1955 the main lodes were the Espiritu Santo, Mina Grande and Espiritu West, which were connected by underground workings and had reached a depth of about 640 metres (2,100 ft). At the end of 1955 the Raposos mines had total reserves of 1,694,080 metric tons of ore with an average of 9.5 grams of gold per ton.

The municipality contains about 10% of the 31,270-hectare (77,300-acre) Serra do Gandarela National Park, created in 2014.

== See also ==
- List of municipalities in Minas Gerais

== Sources ==
- Jacob E. Gair (1949), "Geology and ore deposits of the Nova Lima and Rio Acima quadrangles, Minas Gerais, Brazil", Geological Survey Professional Paper, U.S. Government Printing Office
- PARNA de Serra do Gandarela (in Portuguese), ISA: Instituto Socioambiental
