= Guaratuba Bridge =

- Coordinates: 25.858579°S 48.566699°W
- Crosses: Guaratuba Bay
- Locale: Guaratuba, Brazil

Characteristics
- Design: arch bridge

Location
- Interactive map of Guaratuba Bridge

Guaratuba Bridge (Portuguese: Ponte de Guaratuba) is a cable-stayed bridge over Guaratuba Bay connecting the towns of Guaratuba and Matinhos in the state of Paraná, Brazil.

== History ==
Before the bridge was built, Guaratuba Bay could only be crossed by ferry.

Construction of the bridge began in 2024 and was carried out by the Nova Ponte Consortium on behalf of the Government of the State of Paraná. The total investment in the project was estimated at R$400 million.

The bridge was officially inaugurated on 1 May 2026, in a ceremony attended by the Governor of Paraná, Carlos Roberto Massa Júnior.

== Description ==
The central section of the structure consists of a cable-stayed bridge.
