= Arena MRV =

Football stadium in the state of Minas Gerais, Brazil

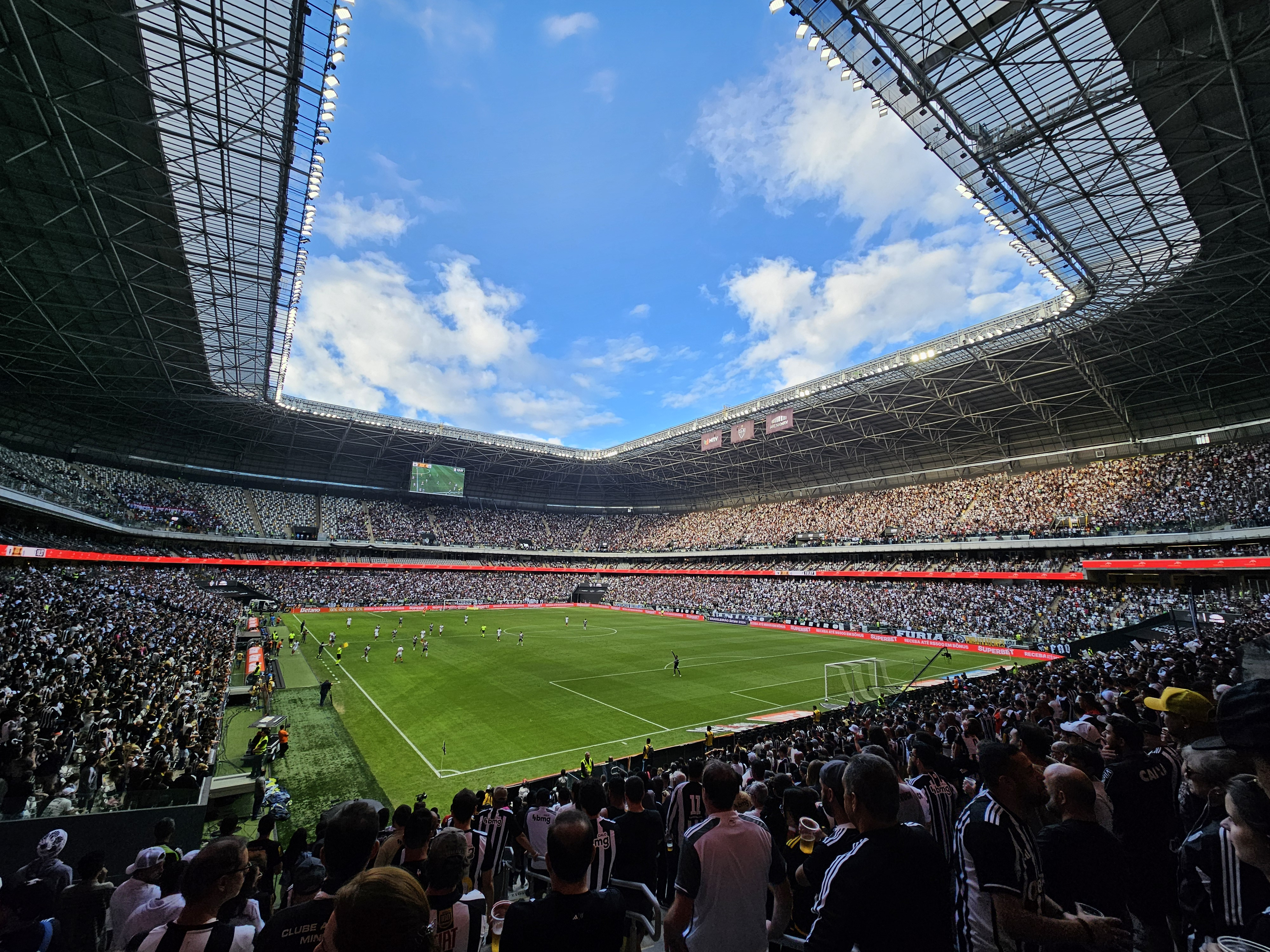
- Inside view of the stadium
- Interactive map of Arena MRV
- Location: Belo Horizonte, Minas Gerais, Brazil
- Coordinates: 19°55′48″S 44°00′52″W
- Owner: Atlético Mineiro
- Operator: Atlético Mineiro
- Capacity: 44,892
- Surface: Synthetic Grass
- Record attendance: 44,870 (Atlético Mineiro 3-0 River Plate, 22 October 2024)
- Field size: 115 yd × 75 yd (105 m × 69 m)

Construction
- Groundbreaking: 20 April 2020; 6 years ago
- Opened: 15 April 2023; 3 years ago
- Cost: $100-120 million (est.)
- Architect: Farkasvölgyi
- General contractor: Racional Engenharia Ltda

Tenants
- Atlético Mineiro (2023–present); Brazil national football team (selected matches)

Website
- www.arenamrv.com.br

Arena MRV is a football stadium located in the Brazilian city of Belo Horizonte. The arena belongs to the Clube Atlético Mineiro, which hosts its home games there. With a capacity of 44,892, it is the second-largest football stadium in Belo Horizonte.

== History ==
The initial step to kick off the construction of a new stadium to house Atlético Mineiro began in September 2017, with the approval by the club's Deliberative Council. The vote, at the club's headquarters in Lourdes, was supported by 325 of the 337 councilors, including several former club presidents such as Ricardo Guimarães, Afonso Paulino, Ziza Valadades and Alexandre Kalil, then mayor of Belo Horizonte. Rubens Menin, president of MRV Engenharia, Atlético's main sponsor, announced that he would donate the land where the stadium were to be built, a plot estimated to be worth R$60 million at the time, in the California neighborhood of Belo Horizonte.

=== Financing ===
To fund the project, which had an initial estimate cost of R$410 million, the club sold 50.1% of its stake in Diamond Mall shopping center for R$250 million. Also as part of the agreement, MRV acquired the naming rights of the future arena for R$60 million for a period of ten years, with the possibility of extension. The club also sought to receive R$100 million for the sale of club seats and luxury suites, with 60% guaranteed by the Banco BMG bank.

=== Project ===
The Arena MRV is located on a plot of land with 56 thousand square meters, in the Northwest Region of the city, on the banks of Avenida Presidente Juscelino Kubitschek, close to the Annual Rodoviario highway and the Eldorado Metro Station. The total area to be built is 114,656.99 m^{2}, of which 35% will be occupied by the arena, 30% by the esplanade, 23% by preserved green areas and 12% by "gardens on natural terrain and paved accesses". The stadium has 47,000 seats, which places it among the ten largest stadiums in the country at the time of its completion and the sixth largest private stadium. Major concerts will take place in the inner area of the arena, with a specific acoustic system of insulating layers and perforated tiles to improve acoustics and protect the sound output. Shows will not be held in the outdoor area, on the esplanade, of the stadium. The project was designed by the architect Bernardo Farkasvölgyi, advisor to the club. Its approval went through discussions at the city's municipal assembly, where a bill was unanimously approved. Before consideration by the plenary, the project passed through select committees on Legislation and Justice, Environment, Public Administration and Budget and Public Finance.

=== Environmental impact ===
In April 2019, the Municipal Environment Council of the Municipality of Belo Horizonte (Comam) unanimously approved the preliminary license for the project. In addition to the stadium, the club was required to create a health care station (UBS) and a day care center in the esplanade section of the stadium land. The club was also required to create a not-for-profit institution named "Instituto Galo", with the goal to reinforce the social interest character of the project. Once the permit was obtained, the land clearing work began.

The environmental license for the execution of the work was granted through a list of 55 counterparts and conditions. Among them, the establishment of bike paths between the Arena and the Eldorado Metro Station and the creation of a program to protect the species of capetinho-do-oco-de-pau, a bird that is at risk of extinction.

An Executive Forest Compensation Project was also carried out, in which the club committed to be in charge of land conservation in a conservation area that corresponds to more than twice the native vegetation that would be suppressed by the stadium construction. The chosen location is in the Serra do Gandarela National Park, located in the municipality of Rio Acima, in the metropolitan region. Arena MRV purchased the land and donated it to the Chico Mendes Institute for Biodiversity Conservation (ICMBio). The two sites, in the neighborhood of California and in Rio Acima, share the same watershed as the São Francisco River and have similar characteristics.

=== Construction ===
20 April 2020 marked the beginning of the works on the new stadium. Due to the COVID-19 pandemic, a small ceremony was attended by ten people who celebrated the entry of the first digging heavy machinery on the site. The country was already experiencing health restrictions due to the COVID-19 pandemic, and activities would continue respecting the determinations of health bodies and municipal and state legislation in force, with all employees working with masks and following safety and hygiene protocols to try to prevent the spread of the new coronavirus. A bid defined Racional Engenharia Ltda as the construction company responsible for the works. Just a year before the start of the construction, the schedule was already 18% complete, with completion scheduled for October 2022.

=== Inauguration ===
On 15 April 2023, the stadium was inaugurated with the attendance of around 9,000 spectators. On 16 July, the venue hosted a match between teams made up of former Atlético players including Dadá Maravilha who made the kick-off.

On 27 August 2023, Atlético made its debut in the arena, beating Santos 2–0 in the Campeonato Brasileiro Série A, with Paulinho scoring the first goal.

=== Music events ===
In September 2023, Arena MRV received its first concerts, with a "BH Festival" on the 6th featuring Clayton & Romário, Jorge & Mateus, and Ivete Sangalo, and on the 9th the stadium's first international attraction, Maroon 5, with Jota Quest as its opener. In December came the first sold-out event, two concerts by Paul McCartney in his Got Back tour. In 2025, Jorge & Mateus returned in August for their 20th anniversary tour, and in October the Arena received the Sertanejo music music event "Histórias - O Show do Século", with Daniel, Chitãozinho & Xororó, César Menotti & Fabiano and Zezé Di Camargo & Luciano. 2026 had in the Arena concerts by Luan Santana, Djavan, and Xuxa. In 2027, Foo Fighters are set to present at the Arena on their Take Cover Tour.

== See also ==
- List of football stadiums in Brazil
- Lists of stadiums
