= Cubatão River (Paraná) =

River in Brazil

- Location within Brazil
- Native name: Rio Cubatão (Portuguese)

Location
- Country: Brazil

Physical characteristics
- Source
  - location: São José dos Pinhais, Paraná
- Mouth
  - location: Guaratuba Bay
  - coordinates: 25.867975°S 48.718191°W

The Cubatão River is a river of Paraná state in southern Brazil.

== Origins ==
The Cubatão River originates in the municipality of São José dos Pinhais, where it is called the São João River. The catchment area of the river is in the 49,287 hectares (121,790 acres) Guaricana National Park, created in 2014.

== Course ==
The São João forms part of the border between Sào José and Guaratuba. After it is joined by the Arraial it takes the name of Cubatão, flowing into the Guaratuba Bay. The river is about 80 kilometres (50 mi) long. Tributaries are the Castelhano, Coatís, Ribeirão Grande, Zoada, Navio Arraial, Cubatãozinho and Preto rivers. The river is navigable up to Três Barras, and above there by canoe to the Salto do Rio Cubatão. The Salto do Rio Cubatão is a series of rapids with large boulders, a tourist attraction.

== See also ==
- List of rivers of Paraná

== Sources ==
- Rio Cubatão (in Portuguese), Prefeitura de Guaratuba
- "Salto do Rio Cubatão", Webventure LTDA (in Portuguese)
- Unidade de Conservação: Parque Nacional Guaricana (in Portuguese), MMA: Ministério do Meio Ambiente
