= Boguaçu State Park =

State park in Paraná, Brazil

- Parque Estadual do Boguaçu
- IUCN category II (national park)
- Location within Brazil
- Nearest city: Guaratuba, Paraná
- Coordinates: 25.910059°S 48.650526°W
- Area: 6,052 hectares (14,950 acres)
- Designation: State park
- Created: 26 February 1998
- Administrator: Instituto Ambiental do Paraná

The Boguaçu State Park (Portuguese: Parque Estadual do Boguaçu) is a state park in the state of Paraná, Brazil.

== Location ==
The Boguaçu State Park is in the municipality of Guaratuba, Paraná, and has an area of 6,052 hectares (14,950 acres). The Boguaçu River is affected by urban pressure from Guaratuba, with landfill in the river's estuary within the state park on an area where the city disposed of its garbage for twenty years, with no control over infiltration into the ground.

== History ==
The Boguaçu State Park was created by decree 4.056 of governor Jaime Lerner on 26 February 1998 with an area of 6,052 hectares (14,950 acres) with the objective of preserving typical mangrove and restinga ecosystems, archaeological and prehistoric heritage and particularly the Sambaquis. The park is part of the 199,446-hectare (492,840-acre) Guaratuba Environmental Protection Area, which also includes the 24.267-hectare (59.97-acre) Saint-Hilaire/Lange National Park. It is part of the larger Lagamar mosaic of conservation units.

== Sources ==
- Ana Lizete Rocha (February 2006), Plano de manejo da área de proteção ambiental de Guaratuba (PDF), Curitiba: Instituto Ambiental do Paraná, archived from the original (PDF) on 2016-11-20
- Jaime Lerner (26 February 1998), Decreto nº 4.056 de 26 de Fevereiro de 1998 (PDF) (in Portuguese)
- Unidades de Conservação - Mosaico do Litoral Sul de São Paulo e do Litoral do Paraná - LAGAMAR (in Portuguese), ICMBio, archived from the original on 2019-05-27
