= Astrothelium megeustomum =

Scientific classification
- Kingdom: Fungi
- Division: Ascomycota
- Class: Dothideomycetes
- Order: Trypetheliales
- Family: Trypetheliaceae
- Genus: Astrothelium
- Species: A. megeustomum

Binomial name
- Astrothelium megeustomum Aptroot & C.A.V.Fraga (2016)

Species of lichen-forming fungus

Astrothelium megeustomum is a species of corticolous (bark-dwelling), crustose lichen in the family Trypetheliaceae, first scientifically described in 2016. It is found in Brazil.

== Taxonomy ==
The species was formally described in 2016 by André Aptroot and Carlos Fraga. The type specimen was collected in Guaratuba, Paraná, Brazil. Fraga found it growing on tree bark in arboreal restinga on May 8, 2015.

== Description ==
Astrothelium megeustomum has a corticate, smooth, somewhat shiny, and continuous thallus covering areas up to 7 cm in diameter and about 0.2 mm thick. The thallus is pale yellowish-green and not surrounded by a prothallus. It does not induce gall formation on the host bark. Ascomata are pyriform (pear-shaped), measuring around 0.6–1.2 mm in diameter. They are mostly aggregated in groups of 2–5 and mostly immersed in the bark tissue below pseudostromata, which are distinctly raised above the thallus and mostly irregular in outline. The wall of the ascomata is carbonised and up to 80 μm thick. Ostioles are eccentric, fused, flat, pale brownish, white-pruinose, and surrounded by a whitish zone. Hamathecium does not contain oil globules. Asci contain eight ascospores each. Ascospores are hyaline, muriform, fusiform, measuring 117–125 by 17–21 μm, with pointed ends and surrounded by a gelatinous layer up to 10 μm thick. The median septum is thickened. Pycnidia were not observed.

== Chemistry ==
The thallus surface of Astrothelium megeustomum is UV negative, and the medulla has no reaction to the potassium hydroxide (K−) chemical spot test. The ostiolar region has a UV+ (yellow) reaction. Thin-layer chromatography analysis reveals the presence of lichexanthone, a xanthone substance that fluoresces when lit with a long-wavelength UV light.

== Habitat and distribution ==
This species is found on smooth bark of trees in old-growth forest. At the time of its original publication, it was only known to occur in Brazil.

== See also ==
- List of lichens of Brazil
