= Lagoa do Parado Municipal Nature Park =

Municipal nature park in Paraná, Brazil

- Parque Municipal Lagoa do Parado
- Location within Brazil
- Nearest city: Guaratuba, Paraná
- Coordinates: 25.748°S 48.719°W
- Designation: Municipal nature park

The Lagoa do Parado Municipal Nature Park (Portuguese: Parque Municipal Lagoa do Parado) is a municipal nature park in the state of Paraná, Brazil. It protects an area of marshland rich in biodiversity.

== Location ==
The Lagoa do Parado Municipal Nature Park (Note: Although the region of the Lagoa do Parado and its tributaries were declared of public use by municipal decree 1626/96, as of 2006 it had not yet been formally made a municipal nature park.) is on the left bank of the Cubatãozinho River in the municipality of Guaratuba, Paraná, at the foot of the Serra do Mar. It is about 5 by 3 kilometres (3.1 by 1.9 mi). The climate is tropical super-humid, with no defined dry season. Average temperatures are over 30 °C (86 °F) in the hottest months and under 15 °C (59 °F) in the coldest.

The lagoa is a river that floods an immense green area on rainy days. In the less rainy periods the Lagoa do Parado divides into the Lagoa das Onças and the Lagoa Baguary. It can be reached only by boat, taking about an hour from the town of Guaratuba. The park adjoins the Saint-Hilaire/Lange National Park. It is in the Guaratuba Environmental Protection Area. It is part of the Lagamar Mosaic of conservation units.

== Environment ==
The lagoon has many caxeta trees, a light wood used to make wooden shoes, pencils, wooden spoons and craft items. The lagoon has abundant fish, and is the largest breeding place for marine life in Guaratuba Bay. It forms an environment like the Pantanal, where birds and small animals forage. It is said to be the area with greatest biodiversity on the coast of Paraná. Capybaras may be seen in the lagoon. Other animals are broad-snouted caiman, lowland paca and common agouti, as well as birds such as herons, ducks and neotropic cormorants. The wattled jacana is a common bird in the ponds and swamps of Brazil. The marsh antwren is rare and considered endangered, a small creeping species identified only recently.

In 2013 ICMBio, IBAMA, IAP and the Environmental Police investigated reports of illegal hunting, fishing and harvesting of palmito-juçara in the park.

== Sources ==
- A Cidade, Guaratuba, archived from the original on 2016-11-20
- Campos, João Batista; Tossulino, Márcia de Guadalupe Pires (February 2006), Plano de Manejo Da Área de Proteção Ambiental de Guaratuba (PDF), Curitiba: SEMA: Secretaria do Meio Ambiente e Recursos Hídricos / PR, archived from the original (PDF) on 2016-11-20
- Genaro, Ana Letícia (15 January 2009), "Natureza intocada na Lagoa do Parado", Gazeta do Povo (in Portuguese)
- ICMBio e parceiros fiscalizam o Parque Nacional e seu entorno (in Portuguese), Parque Nacional de Saint-Hilaire/Lange, 14 October 2013
- "Lagoa do Parado: uma reserva biológica no litoral Paranaense", Tribuna/PR, 25 January 2005
- Parques, Reservas e Estações Ecológicas (in Portuguese), Panorama do Litoral, Guaratuba, Matinhos, Caiobá
- Porque Apicultura na APA de Guaratuba (in Portuguese), AALIPA
- Unidades de Conservação - Mosaico do Litoral Sul de São Paulo e do Litoral do Paraná - LAGAMAR (in Portuguese), ICMBio, archived from the original on 2019-05-27
