= Cubatãozinho River =

River in Brazil

- Location within Brazil
- Native name: Rio Cubatãozinho (Portuguese)

Location
- Country: Brazil

Physical characteristics
- Mouth: Cubatão River
  - coordinates: 25°52′S 48°43′W

The Cubatãozinho River is a river of Paraná state in southern Brazil.

The river rises in the 49,287 hectares (121,790 acres) Guaricana National Park, created in 2014, which protects a mountainous area of Atlantic Forest. The Lagoa do Parado Municipal Nature Park, which protects an area of marshland rich in biodiversity, lies on the left bank of the river.

The river originates in the Serra das Canavieiras between Guaratuba and Morretes. It has a course of around 60 km, being navigable by canoes until Porto Limeira. Its tributaries are Ribeirão da Prata, Rio dos Henriques, Guarajuva, Canavieiras, Parado, Furta Maré and Rasgado.

== See also ==
- List of rivers of Paraná

== Sources ==
- A Cidade, Guaratuba, archived from the original on 2016-11-20
- "Lagoa do Parado: uma reserva biológica no litoral Paranaense", Tribuna/PR, 25 January 2005
- Unidade de Conservação: Parque Nacional Guaricana (in Portuguese), MMA: Ministério do Meio Ambiente
