= Afonso Pena Júnior =

Brazilian politician and writer

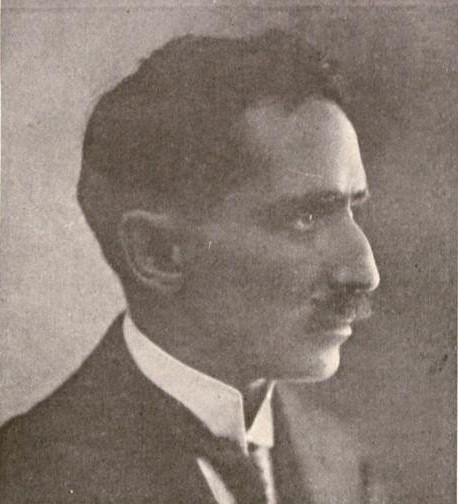
In 1925.

Afonso Augusto Moreira Pena Júnior (25 December 1879 – 12 April 1968) was a Brazilian lawyer, essayist, journalist, politician, and professor. A member of the Brazilian Academy of Letters, he wrote on the authorship of the poetry collection Cartas chilenas, which he attributed to Tomás Antônio Gonzaga, and on the baroque book Arte de Furtar, which he attempted to ascribe to António de Sousa de Macedo.

== Biography ==
Born in Santa Bárbara in the state of Minas Gerais, he was the son of lawyer and professor Afonso Pena, who later became president of Brazil, and Maria Guilhermina de Oliveira Pena. Having completed his early schooling in Ouro Preto, he studied at the Colégio do Caraça and then enrolled at the Faculty of Law of Belo Horizonte, from which he graduated in 1902. In his youth, Pena Júnior wrote poetry in the symbolist style and was active in a literary circle known as Jardineiros do Ideal. He was elected as a state deputy for Minas Gerais in 1902 and reelected in 1907, serving until 1910, when he supported the presidential campaign of Ruy Barbosa. He was a professor of international and civil law at his alma mater.

During the presidency of Artur Bernardes, he left office as a state deputy to become Secretary of Internal Affairs and occupied the position until September 1922. He was elected federal deputy in 1923, and two years later was appointed Minister of Justice and Internal Affairs. As a member of the Mineiro Republican Party, he helped articulate the presidential campaign of Getúlio Vargas, launched by the Liberal Alliance in 1930. After the Revolution of 1930, he became director of the Banco do Brasil, where he would later work as legal advisor. With the approval of the Electoral Code, he became Attorney General for the Superior Electoral Court in 1932.

On 27 March 1937, he was appointed rector of the newly established University of the Federal District. In 1943, he signed the Manifesto of the Mineiros, a public letter calling for the end of the Estado Novo and the redemocratization of Brazil. In 1950, he was considered as a possible presidential candidate by the National Democratic Union, but ultimately the party chose Eduardo Gomes.

== Works ==
- A educação pelo escotismo (1935)
- Crítica de atribuição de um manuscrito da Biblioteca da Ajuda (1945)
- A Arte de Furtar e o seu autor, essay in two volumes (1946)
