= Guaricana National Park =

National park in Paraná, Brazil

- Parque Nacional Guaricana
- IUCN category II (national park)
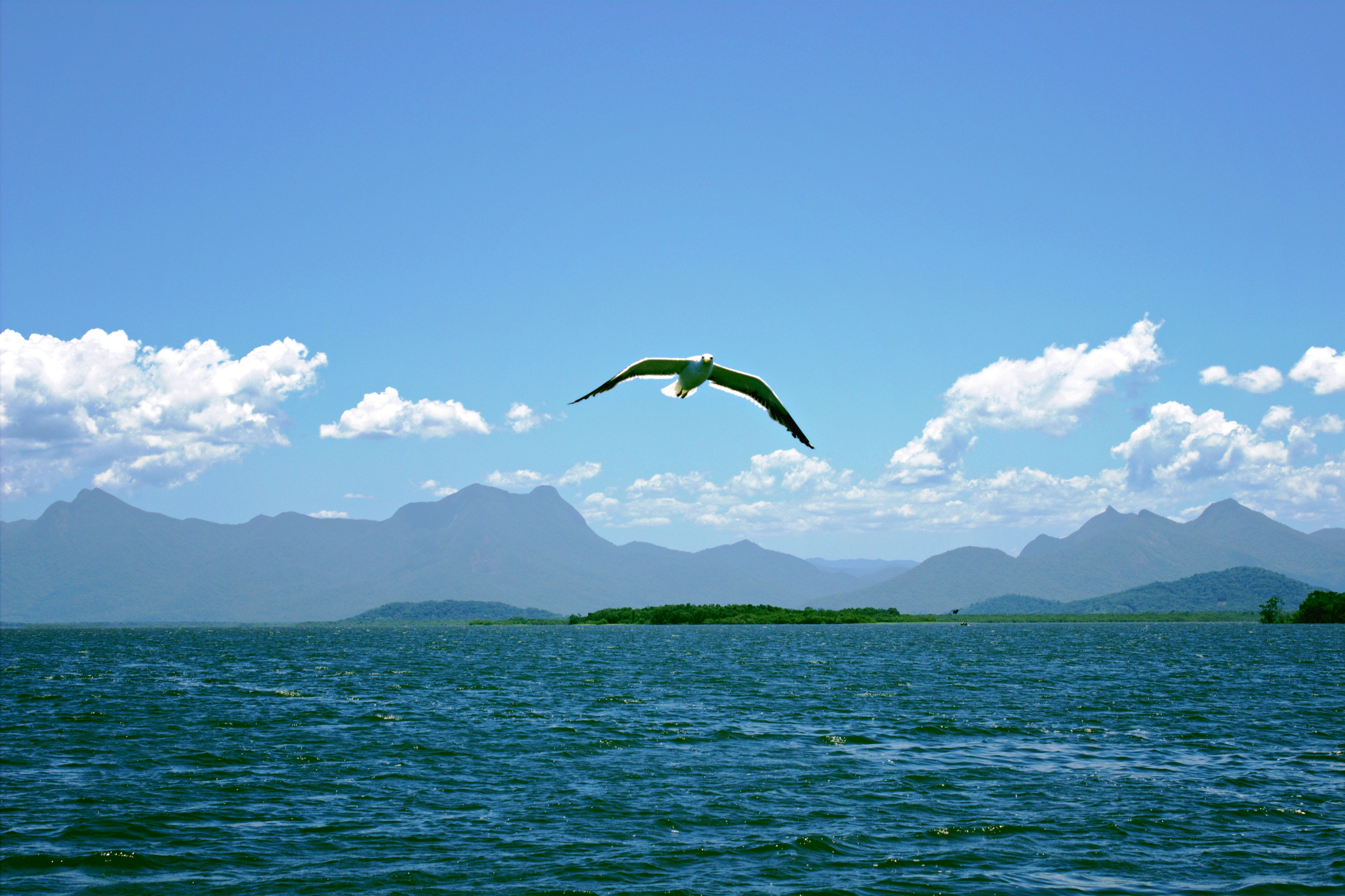
- Guaratuba Bay with the mountains of Guaricana National Park in the background

- Location within Brazil
- Nearest city: Guaratuba, Paraná
- Coordinates: 25.701335°S 48.875599°W
- Designation: National park
- Administrator: Chico Mendes Institute for Biodiversity Conservation

The Guaricana National Park (Portuguese: Parque Nacional Guaricana) is a national park in the state of Paraná, Brazil. It protects a mountainous area holding a remnant of Atlantic Forest.

== Location ==
The Guaricana National Park covers parts of the municipalities of Guaratuba (67.49% of the park), Morretes (19.47%) and São José dos Pinhais (13.04%) in the state of Paraná. It is west of the Saint-Hilaire/Lange National Park, south of highway BR-277, and east of highway BR-376. Guaratuba Bay is to the south east. It has an area of 49,286.87 hectares (121,790.5 acres).

The park lies in the mountains that rise to the east of the interior plateau of Curitiba. The range rises up to 1,000 metres (3,300 ft) above the level of the plateau, with altitudes from 100 to 1,680 metres (330 to 5,510 ft) above sea level. The terrain is mountainous, cut by deep valleys. The whole of the park is in the littoral basin of Paraná, mainly the catchments of the Cubatão and Cubatãozinho rivers. A small part of the northeast holds the basins of the Pinto and Sagrado rivers, which flow north into Paranaguá Bay.

Average annual rainfall is 3,000 millimetres (120 in). Temperatures range from 15 to 28 °C (59 to 82 °F) with an average of 22 °C (72 °F). The park is in the Atlantic Forest biome. The park is in the contact zone between mixed rainforest with Araucaria and dense Atlantic rainforest at the lower levels. There is sparser vegetation and alpine meadows on the higher parts of the Canavieiras and Igreja ranges.

== History ==
The Guaricana National Park was created by presidential decree on 13 October 2014. It is administered by the Chico Mendes Institute for Biodiversity Conservation (ICMBio). It is classed as IUCN protected area category II (national park). The purpose is to ensure preservation of remnants of dense rain forest and mixed deciduous forest including flora, fauna, water and geological resources, and associated natural landscapes. The decree of 13 October 2014 also established the Serra do Gandarela National Park and the Nascentes Geraizeiras Sustainable Development Reserve, both in Minas Gerais, and added over 30,000 hectares (74,000 acres) to the existing Médio Juruá Extractive Reserve in Amazonas.

== Sources ==
- Governo federal cria e amplia unidades de conservação em Minas Gerais, Paraná, Amazonas e Pará (in Portuguese), Secretaria de Governo auxilia o Presidente da República, 14 October 2014, archived from the original on 2019-07-19
- PARNA Guaricana (in Portuguese), ISA: Instituto Socioambiental
- Parna Guaricana (in Portuguese), Chico Mendes Institute for Biodiversity Conservation, archived from the original on 2019-09-15
- Unidade de Conservação: Parque Nacional Guaricana (in Portuguese), MMA: Ministério do Meio Ambiente
