= Tijucas do Sul =

Coordinates: 25°56′S 49°11′W

- Municipality
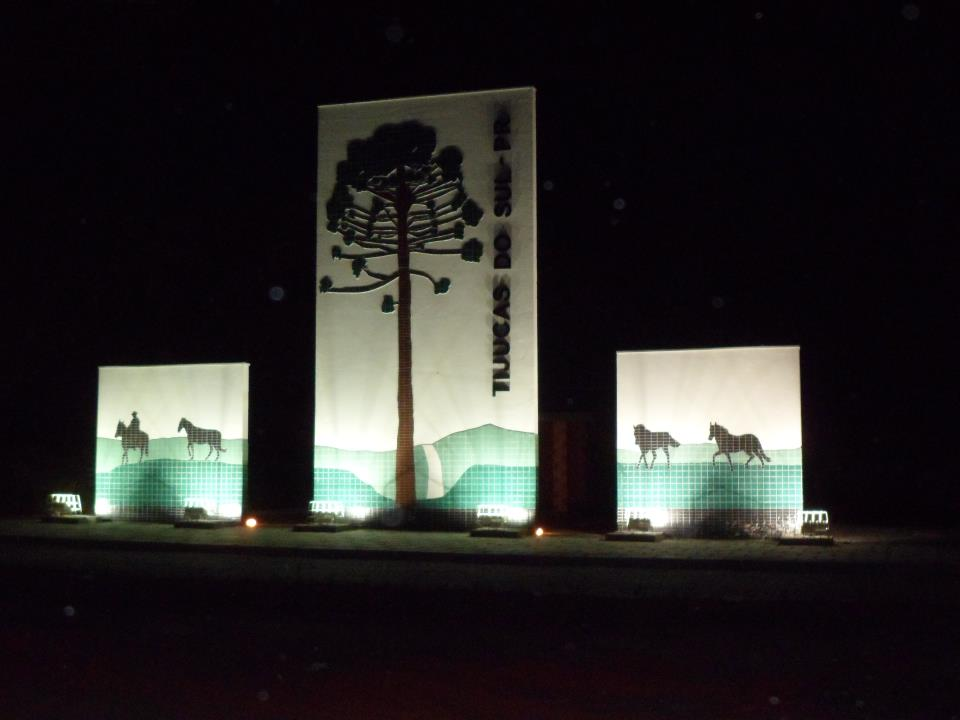

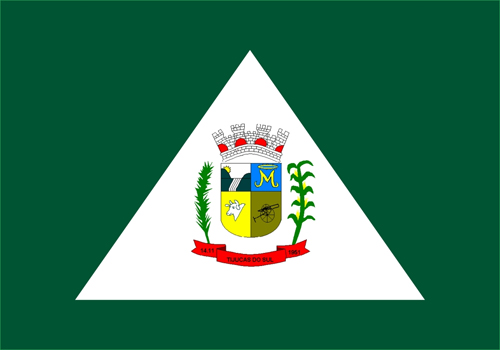
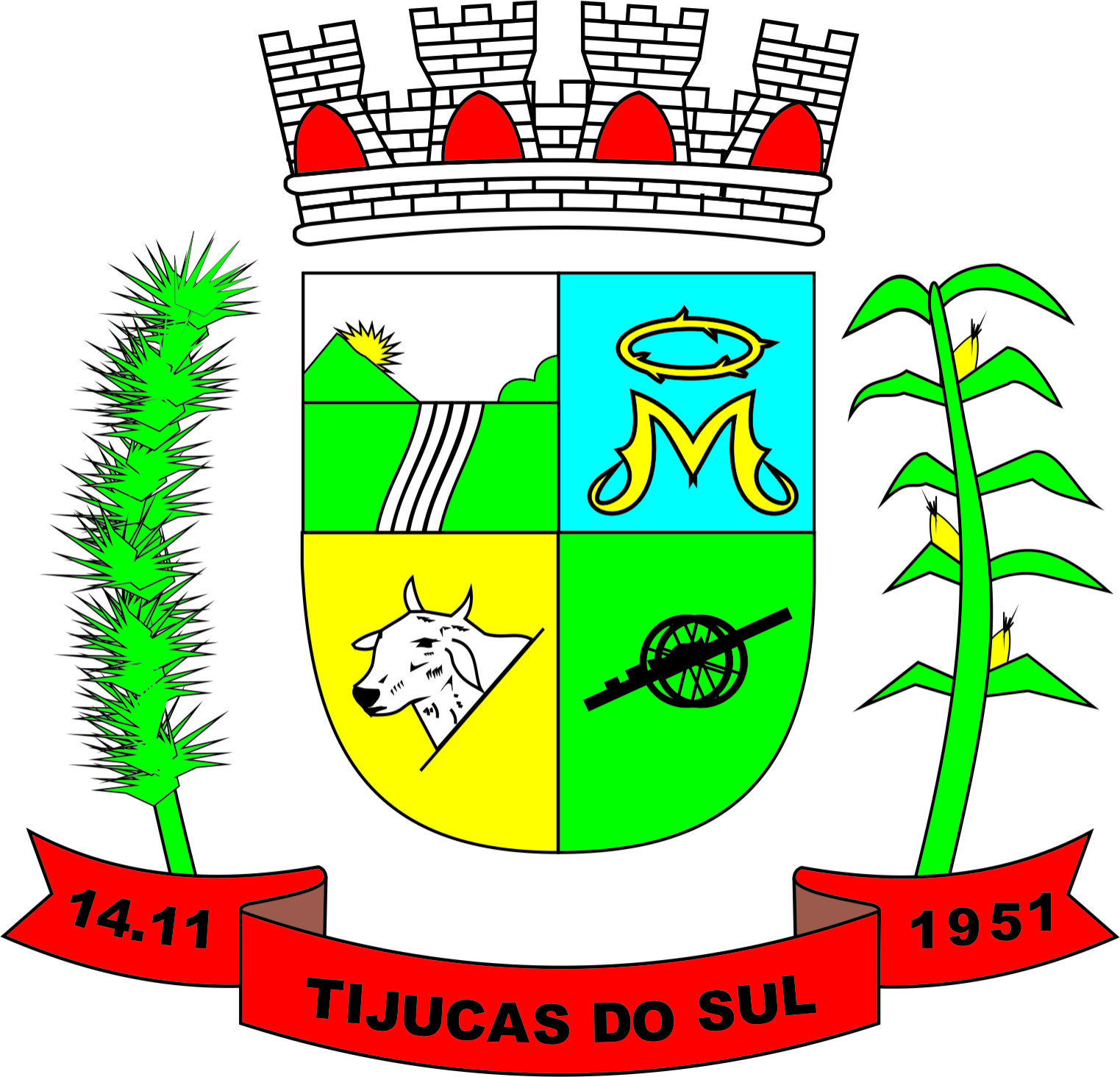
- Flag Coat of arms
- Interactive map of Tijucas do Sul
- Country: Brazil
- Region: Southern
- State: Paraná
- Mesoregion: Metropolitana de Curitiba

Population (2020)
  - Total: 17,084
- Time zone: UTC−3 (BRT)

Tijucas do Sul is a municipality in the state of Paraná in the Southern Region of Brazil. It is known for its horse ranches and attracts tourists all year round.

The municipality contains 10% of the 199,587 hectares (493,190 acres) Guaratuba Environmental Protection Area, created in 1992.

As of 2020, it has a population of 17,084.

== See also ==
- List of municipalities in Paraná
