= São João River (Cubatão River tributary) =

River in Brazil

Location
- Country: Brazil

Physical characteristics
- Source
  - location: Paraná state
- Mouth: Cubatão River
  - coordinates: 25°52′S 48°44′W

The São João River is a river of Paraná state in southern Brazil. It is a tributary of the Cubatão River.

== See also ==
- List of rivers of Paraná
