= Rio da Onça State Park =

State park in Paraná, Brazil

- Parque Estadual Florestal do Rio da Onça
- IUCN category II (national park)
- Location within Brazil
- Nearest city: Matinhos, Paraná
- Coordinates: 25°47′12″S 48°31′35″W
- Area: 1,660 hectares (4,100 acres)
- Designation: State park
- Created: 4 June 1984

The Rio da Onça State Park (Portuguese: Parque Estadual Florestal do Rio da Onça) is a State park in the state of Paraná, Brazil.

== Location ==
The Rio da Onça State Park is in the center of the municipality of Matinhos, Paraná, and covers 1,660 hectares (4,100 acres). It is accessed by PR 412, Balneário Riviera II. The park has a portal, interpretive trails, suspended bridges, visitor center and belvedere. Trails start from the visitor center and are well marked and on flat ground, with explanatory signs. There are bridges over flooded areas. The Bromeliads Lookout is the main observation point, where plants, animals, butterflies and bromeliads can be observed. From the belvedere visitors can view the formation of the tops of the trees.

The Rio da Onça State Park was created by state decree 3825 of 4 June 1984 with an area of 118.5 hectares (293 acres), later expanded to 1,660 hectares (4,100 acres). The park offers environmental programs throughout the year. The reserve is part of the Lagamar Mosaic.

== Environment ==
The park has dense rainforest vegetation, some of which was present before the park was created, and some from reforestation in the area that used to hold the municipal garbage dump. The reforested areas are now in a middle or advanced level of regeneration. Vegetation includes stands of Tabebuia cassinoides, marshes and restingas. Flora include Nectandra megapotamica, Ilex theezans, Tapirira guianensis, jacaranda, Crataeva tapia and Clusia criuva. Fauna include Brazilian guinea pig (Cavia aperea), oncilla (Leopardus tigrinus) and opossums (Didelphis). 25 species of reptiles have been observed and 19 amphibians.

== Sources ==
- Calderari, Natali (5 June 2015), "Parque Estadual Florestal Rio da Onça", Exploradores do Litoral Paranaense
- Parque Estadual Rio da Onça é uma opção de lazer no Litoral (in Portuguese), Agência de Notícias do Paraná, 23 January 2015
- Parque Estadual Florestal do Rio da Onça (Matinhos) (in Portuguese), Prefeitura Municipal de Matinhos, archived from the original on 2012-01-01
- Unidades de Conservação - Mosaico do Litoral Sul de São Paulo e do Litoral do Paraná - LAGAMAR (in Portuguese), ICMBio, archived from the original on 2019-05-27
