= Guaratuba Environmental Protection Area =

- Área de Proteção Ambiental de Guaratuba
- IUCN category V (protected landscape/seascape)
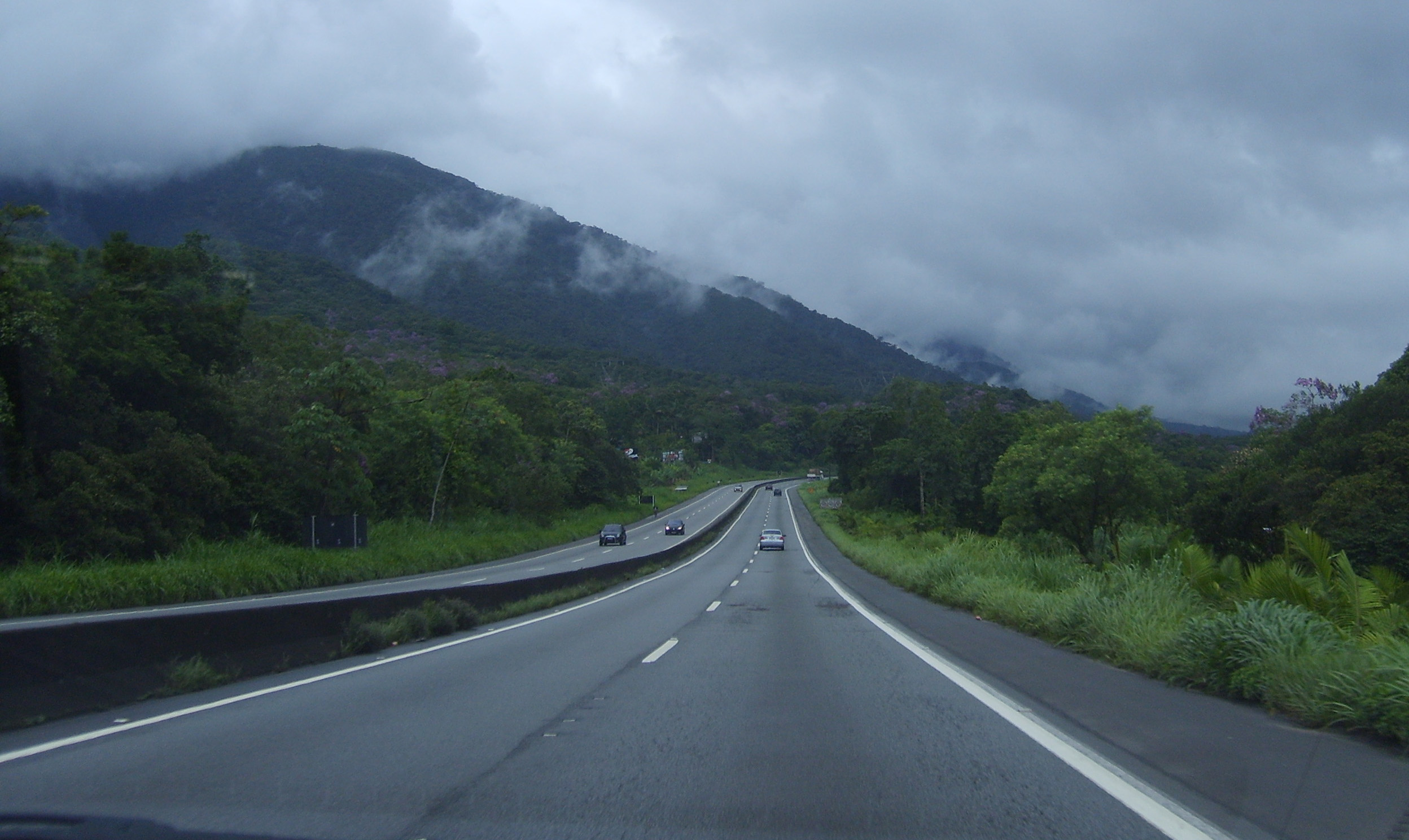
- BR-376 in the western part of the APA

- Location within Brazil
- Nearest city: Guaratuba, Paraná
- Coordinates: 25.749°S 48.789°W
- Area: 199,587 hectares (493,190 acres)
- Designation: Environmental protection area
- Created: 27 March 1992
- Administrator: Instituto Ambiental do Paraná

The Guaratuba Environmental Protection Area (Portuguese: Área de Proteção Ambiental de Guaratuba) is an environmental protection area in the state of Paraná, Brazil.

== Location ==
The Guaratuba Environmental Protection Area (APA) is divided between the municipalities of Guaratuba (66.7%), Matinhos (1.1%), Morretes (5.71%), Paranaguá (4.45%), São José dos Pinhais (12.38%) and Tijucas do Sul (9.67%) in Paraná. It has an area of 199,587 hectares (493,190 acres). The APA contains the Saint-Hilaire/Lange National Park in its northeast and the Lagoa do Parado Municipal Nature Park (Note: Although the region of the Lagoa do Parado and its tributaries were declared of public use by municipal decree 1626/96, as of 2006 it had not yet been formally made a municipal nature park.) and Boguaçu State Park in the southeast. It is part of the Lagamar Mosaic of conservation units.

== History ==
Despite a lack of systematic study, 131 archaeological sites have been identified, typically sambaquis, or large accumulations of the shells of mollusks and crustaceans and the bones of fish. Of more recent date, the Caminho do Ambrósios was an important route by which Iberian settlers penetrated into the territory of Paraná.

The Guaratuba Environmental Protection Area was created by the governor of the state of Paraná through decree 1.234 of 27 March 1992. The objective was to reconcile rational use of the environmental resources of the region and orderly occupation of the land with protection of the water resources, remnants of Atlantic Forest and mangroves, archaeological sites and diversity of fauna, to control tourist use and to guarantee the quality of life of the caiçaras communities and the local population.

== Environment ==
The Guaratuba APA has a Köppen climate classification of Af(t) (Tropical rainforest climate), temperate/mesothermal, tropical rains, always humid. In the lowlands average temperatures are 21.1 °C (70.0 °F). In the Serra do Mar annual average temperatures range from 11.5 to 14 °C (52.7 to 57.2 °F).

Vegetation includes mixed alluvial and montane rainforest, dense rainforest (alluvial, lowland, sub-montane, montane and high montane), and pioneer formations of vegetation with fluvial, fluvial-marine and marine influence. The mangroves and salt marshes play a basic role in the ecological balance of the estuarine complex. The coastal plain of the APA is home to about 64 species of mammal, five of which are endemic to the Atlantic Forest and 11 considered endangered in the state. Studies of birdlife in the mangroves, wetlands, plains and hillsides have recorded 322 species of which 71 are endemic to the Atlantic Forest and 10 threatened with extinction. The marsh antwren (Stymphalornis acutirostris) was discovered in the APA in 1995. The APA is used by migratory species such as tortoises, swallows and loons.

== Human activities and threats ==
The region has good potential for tourism with its mountains, rivers, waterfalls, dams, bay, coastal plains, mangroves and archaeological sites, as well as the two parks. Human activities include family farming, commercial agriculture, mineral exploration, fishing, hunting, food products manufacture and extraction of forest products such as ornamental plants, bromeliads and hearts of palm. Threats include uncontrolled extraction of forest products, hunting, unauthorized occupation by squatters, use of agrochemicals, mining, degradation of archaeological sites and reforestation with pines, an exotic invasive species. Other threats are sprawl of the Guaratuba and Matinhos urban areas, predatory fishing and buffalo farming.

== Sources ==
- APA Guaratuba (in Portuguese), ISA: Instituto Socioambiental
- Área de Proteção Ambiental de Guaratuba (in Portuguese), SEMA: Secretaria do Meio Ambiente e Recursos Hídricos / PR
- Campos, João Batista; Tossulino, Márcia de Guadalupe Pires (February 2006), Plano de Manejo Da Área de Proteção Ambiental de Guaratuba (PDF), Curitiba: SEMA: Secretaria do Meio Ambiente e Recursos Hídricos / PR, archived from the original (PDF) on 2016-11-20
- "Guaratuba, Matinhos e Caiobá", Panorama do Litoral, Guaratuba, Matinhos, Caiobá (in Portuguese)
- Unidades de Conservação - Mosaico do Litoral Sul de São Paulo e do Litoral do Paraná - LAGAMAR (in Portuguese), ICMBio, archived from the original on 2019-05-27
