= Saint-Hilaire/Lange National Park =

National park in Paraná, Brazil

- Parque Nacional de Saint-Hilaire/Lange
- IUCN category II (national park)
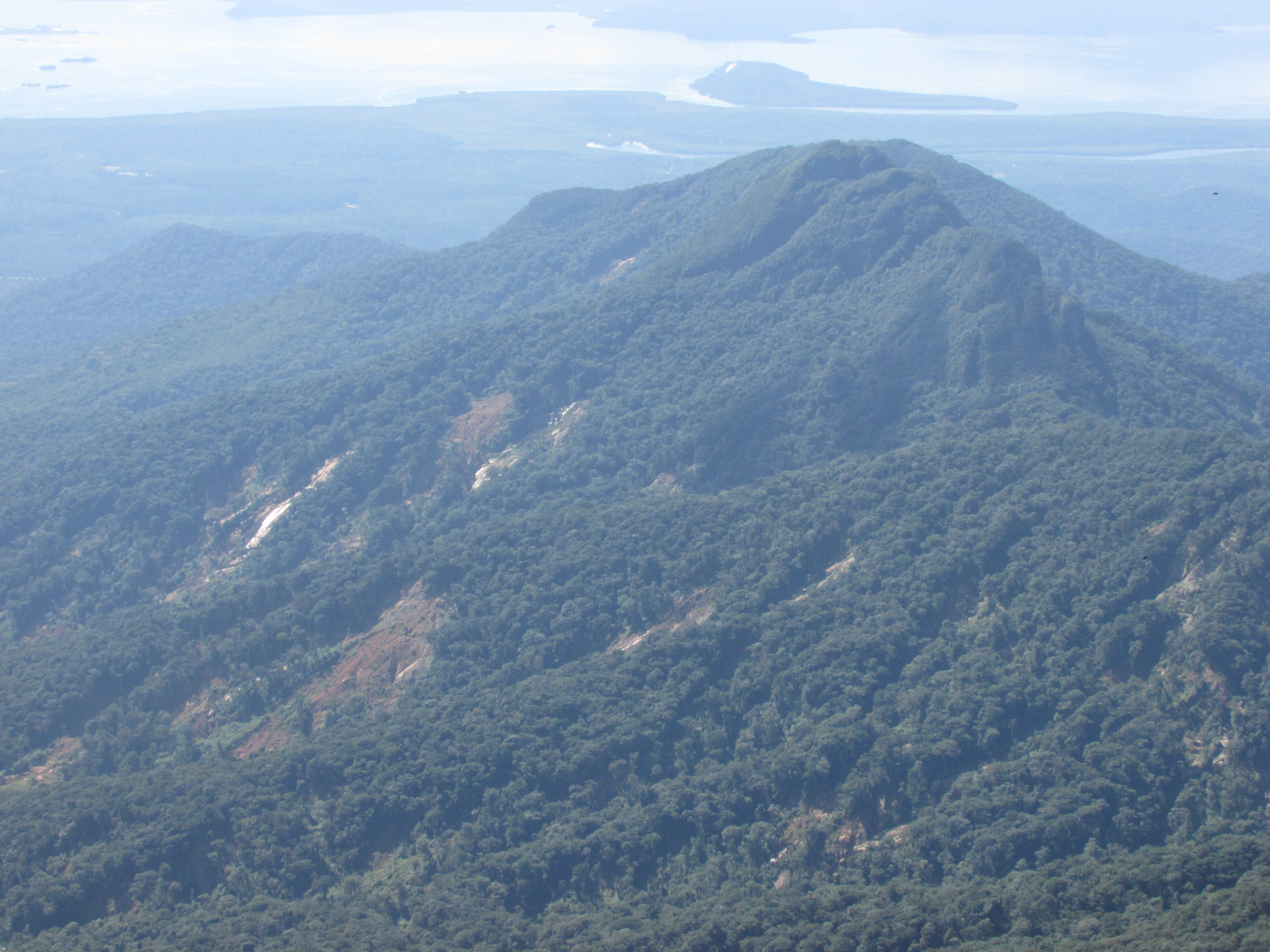
- Landslides caused by rain in 2011

- Location within Brazil
- Nearest city: Paranaguá, Paraná
- Coordinates: 25°41′02″S 48°38′38″W
- Area: 25,119 hectares (62,070 acres)
- Designation: National park
- Created: 23 May 2001
- Administrator: ICMBio

Saint-Hilaire/Lange National Park (Portuguese: Parque Nacional de Saint-Hilaire/Lange) is a national park in Paraná, Brazil.

== Location ==
The park is in the Atlantic Forest biome. It covers 25,119 hectares (62,070 acres). It was created by Law 10.227 of 23 May 2001, and is administered by the Chico Mendes Institute for Biodiversity Conservation. The park covers parts of the municipalities of Guaratuba, Matinhos, Morretes and Paranaguá in Paraná. Altitude ranges from 10 to 1,500 metres (33 to 4,921 ft). The park is contained within the Guaratuba Environmental Protection Area.

== Environment ==
The park contains the Serra da Prata, the easternmost mountains in the state of Paraná and part of the coastal mountain sub-region of Serra do Mar. The mountains run through the park in a north-south direction in the north and east parts of the park. The highest point is Morro Grande at 1,500 metres (4,900 ft) above sea level. The terrain in this area is characterized by large valleys and steep slopes, generally steeper than 45%. The south west of the park has gentler terrain with altitudes below 150 metres (490 ft), holding floodplains of rivers approaching Guaratuba Bay. The Serra da Prata has great importance as a source of water, providing excellent-quality surface water to the string of communities from Cabaraquara in the municipality of Guaratuba to the city of Paranaguá. Most of the water drains to the east into the Atlantic Ocean or toe the south into Guaratuba Bay.

The park's vegetation includes lowland rainforest, dense montane rainforest and high-altitude meadows. There are large numbers of epiphytes, particularly bromeliads and orchids. Secondary growth is mainly found in the low-lying areas where there has been most human interference. Several endangered plant species at the national and state levels are found here, including Palmito Jussara (Euterpe edulis), Canela-preta (Ocotea catharinensis), Canela-sassafrás (Ocotea odorifera), Imbuia (Ocotea porosa) and Heliconia farinosa. The tiny Brachycephalus izecksohni frog is endemic to the Serra da Prata.

== Conservation ==
The park is classified as IUCN protected area category II (national park). It has the objectives of preserving natural ecosystems of great ecological relevance and scenic beauty, enabling scientific research, environmental education, outdoors recreation and eco-tourism. Specifically it was created to protect and conserve the Atlantic Forest ecosystems in the area and ensure the environmental stability of the springs under its influence, and the quality of life of the coastal populations. The park is part of the Lagamar mosaic.

Protected species include cougar (Puma concolor), red-tailed amazon (Amazona brasiliensis), restinga tyrannulet (Phylloscartes kronei), marsh antwren (Stymphalornis acutirostris) and fasciated tiger heron (Tigrisoma fasciatum).

== Sources ==
- "Guaratuba, Matinhos e Caiobá", Panorama do Litoral, Guaratuba, Matinhos, Caiobá (in Portuguese), archived from the original on 2020-02-24
- Parna de Saint-Hilaire-Lange (in Portuguese), Chico Mendes Institute for Biodiversity Conservation, archived from the original on 2021-04-11
- Unidade de Conservação: Parque Nacional de Saint-Hilaire/Lange (in Portuguese), MMA: Ministério do Meio Ambiente
- Unidades de Conservação - Mosaico do Litoral Sul de São Paulo e do Litoral do Paraná - LAGAMAR (in Portuguese), ICMBio, archived from the original on 2019-05-27
