= Rio Acima =

Municipality of Brazil

Coordinates: 20°05′16″S 43°47′20″W

- Municipality
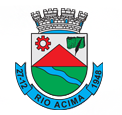
- Coat of arms
- Interactive map of Rio Acima
- Country: Brazil
- State: Minas Gerais
- Region: Southeast

Population (2022 Census)
  - Total: 10,261
  - Estimate (2025): 10,698
- Time zone: UTC−3 (BRT)

Location of Rio Acima within Minas Gerais

Rio Acima is a Brazilian municipality located in the state of Minas Gerais. The city belongs to the mesoregion Metropolitana de Belo Horizonte and to the microregion of Belo Horizonte. As of 2025, the estimated population was 10,698.

The municipality contains almost 20% of the 31,270 hectares (77,300 acres) Serra do Gandarela National Park, created in 2014.

== See also ==
- List of municipalities in Minas Gerais
