= Serra do Gandarela National Park =

National park in Minas Gerais, Brazil

- Parque Nacional da Serra do Gandarela
- IUCN category II (national park)
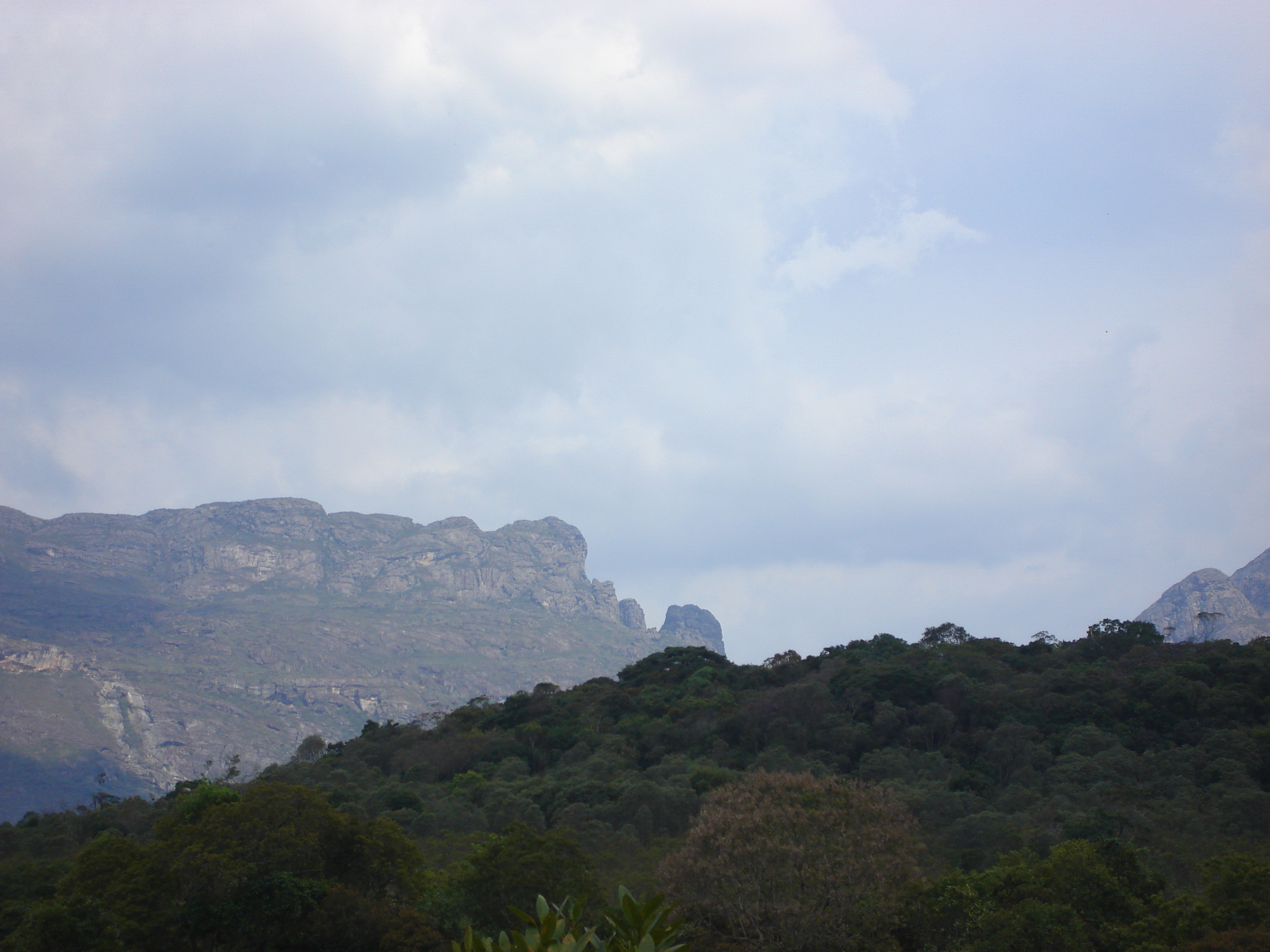
- Serra do Caraça, part of which is in the park

- Location within Brazil
- Nearest city: Belo Horizonte, Minas Gerais
- Coordinates: 20°04′26″S 43°39′48″W
- Area: 31,270.83 hectares (77,271.9 acres)
- Designation: National park
- Created: 13 October 2014
- Administrator: ICMBio

Serra do Gandarela National Park (Portuguese: Parque Nacional da Serra do Gandarela) is a national park in the state of Minas Gerais, Brazil. It protects a mountainous region holding a remnant of Atlantic Forest that is an important source of water for the city of Belo Horizonte.

== Location ==
The Serra do Gandarela is a natural sanctuary about 40 kilometres (25 mi) from Belo Horizonte. Serra do Gandarela National Park covers parts of the municipalities of Caeté (2.37%), Itabirito (10.01%), Mariana (0.23%), Nova Lima (1.99%), Ouro Preto (9.91%, Raposos (10.8%), Rio Acima (19.46%) and Santa Bárbara (45.22%) in the state of Minas Gerais. Part of the park is in the Belo Horizonte metropolitan region. The park has an area of 31,270.83 hectares (77,271.9 acres).

The park is in the Atlantic Forest biome. It holds the largest intact remnant of Atlantic Forest in Minas Gerais, mostly in excellent condition. Waters from the Serra do Gandarela feed the basins of the Das Velhas River, a tributary of the São Francisco River, the Piracicaba River and the Doce River. The Das Velhas provides more than 60% of the water for Belo Horizonte and 45% of the water for the metropolitan region. The water is clean and requires little treatment. The Serra do Gandarela contains over 100 caves. Some support unique species, and some contain archaeological sites.

== History ==
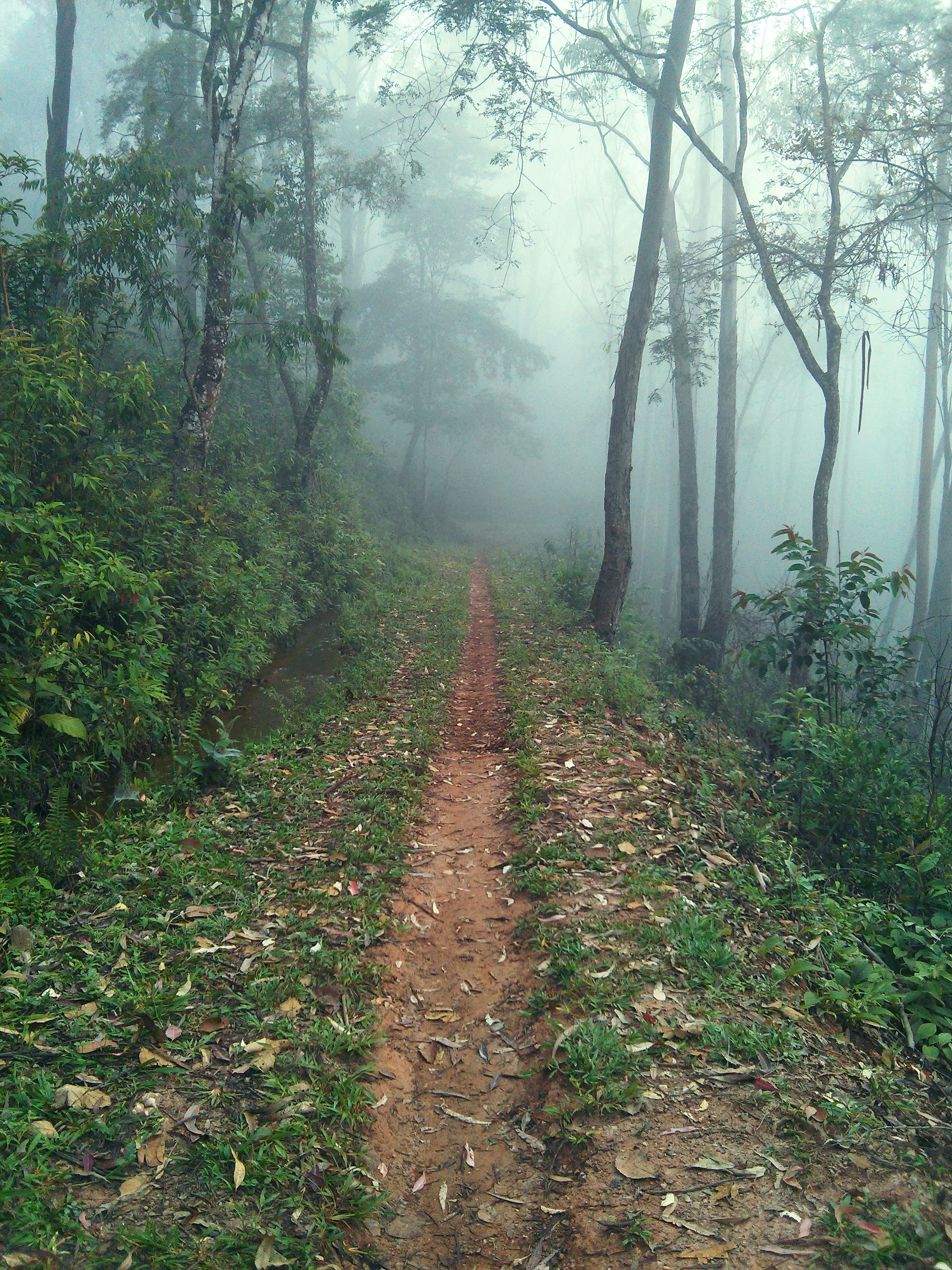
The forest near Nova Lima

At the request of a number of civil organisations the Chico Mendes Institute for Biodiversity Conservation (ICMBio) prepared a proposal for creating the park, protecting a large part of the Belo Horizonte water sources, which were seriously threatened by mining for iron ore. The original proposal in 2010 was to protect an area of 38,220 hectares (94,400 acres), but this was reduced before the park was created. Public discussions about the project were started on 10 April 2012.

The park was created by federal decree on 13 October 2014. The decree also added over 30,000 hectares (74,000 acres) to the Médio Juruá Extractive Reserve in Amazonas and created the Guaricana National Park in Paraná and the Nascentes Geraizeiras Sustainable Development Reserve in Minas Gerais. The national park is classed as IUCN protected area category II (national park). The purpose is to preserve samples of biological, geological, speleological and hydrological heritage associated with the Quadrilátero Ferrífero formations, including alpine meadows, remnants of semi-deciduous forest, aquifer recharge areas and the scenery of mountains, plateaus, rivers, waterfalls and natural vegetation.

The park boundaries did not satisfy the requests of the social organisations who had been consulted, since it did not fully protect the geological formations holding the water supply aquifers. The area of Vale's R$4 billion Apollo iron ore project was excluded. On the other hand, the park included areas traditionally used by the surrounding communities, causing potential conflict. Roberto Vizentin, president of ICMBio, defended the reduction from 38,200 to 31,200 hectares (94,000 to 77,000 acres) and the high risk of pollution from mining as a necessary compromise given the relatively low Human Development Index in the region.

== Fauna ==
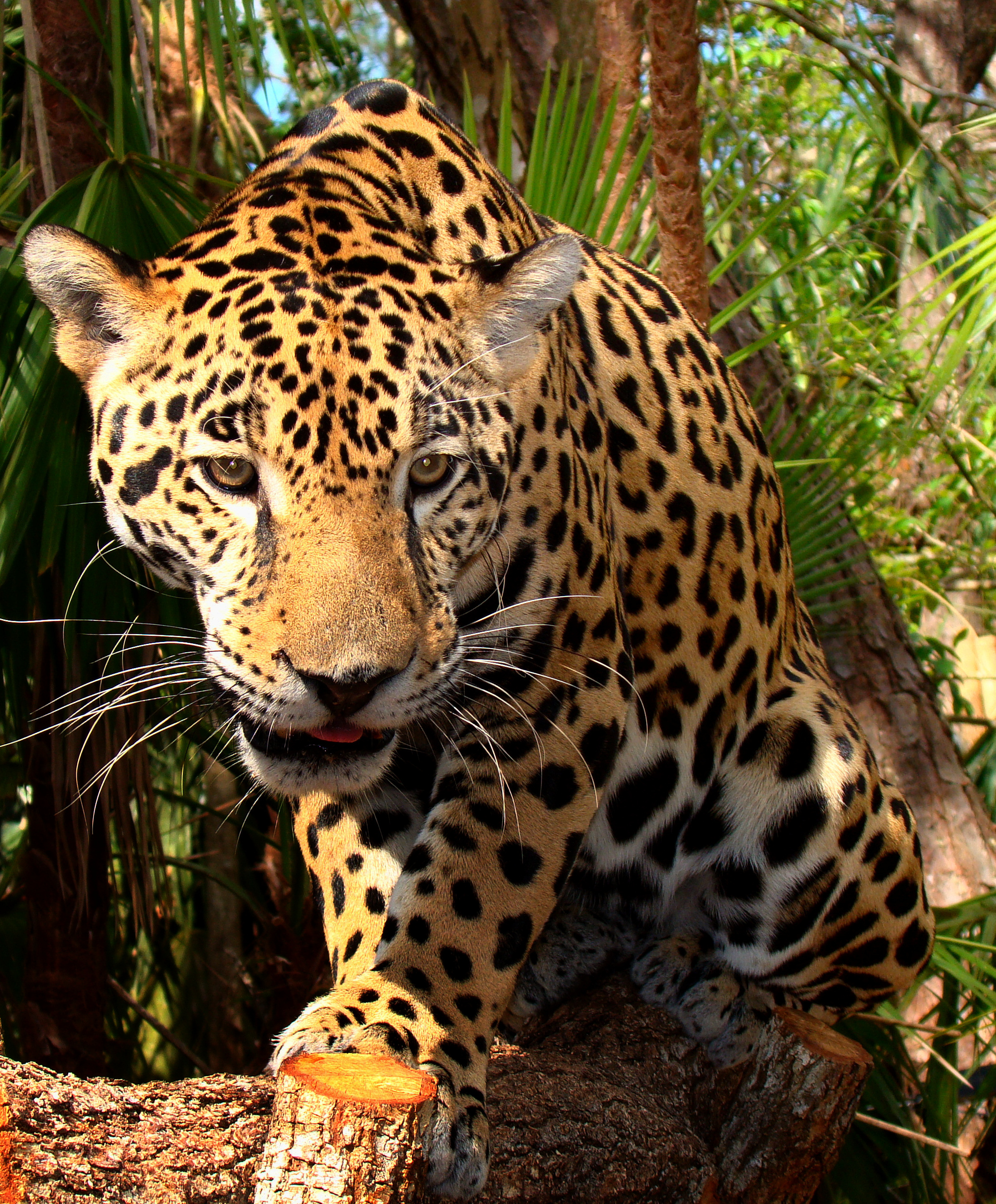
The jaguar is a conspicuous inhabitant of Serra do Gandarela National Park.

The Iron Quadrangle (Quadrilátero Ferrífero), where the park is located, is a transition region between the biomasses of the Atlantic Forest and Cerrado, which contributes to increase species diversity, the presence of typical species of the two biomasses.

Among the animal species that live in the park are theː chaco eagle (Harpyhaliaetus coronatus), cinereous warbling finch (Poospiza cinerea), cougar (Puma concolor), brown howler (Alouatta guariba), tayra (Eira barbara), margay (Leopardus wiedii), collared peccary (Pecari tajacu), masked titi (Callicebus personatus), maned wolf (Chrysocyon brachyurus), southern tamandua (Tamandua tetradactyla), long-nosed armadillo (Dasypus septemcinctus) and jaguar (Panthera onca).

.

== Flora ==
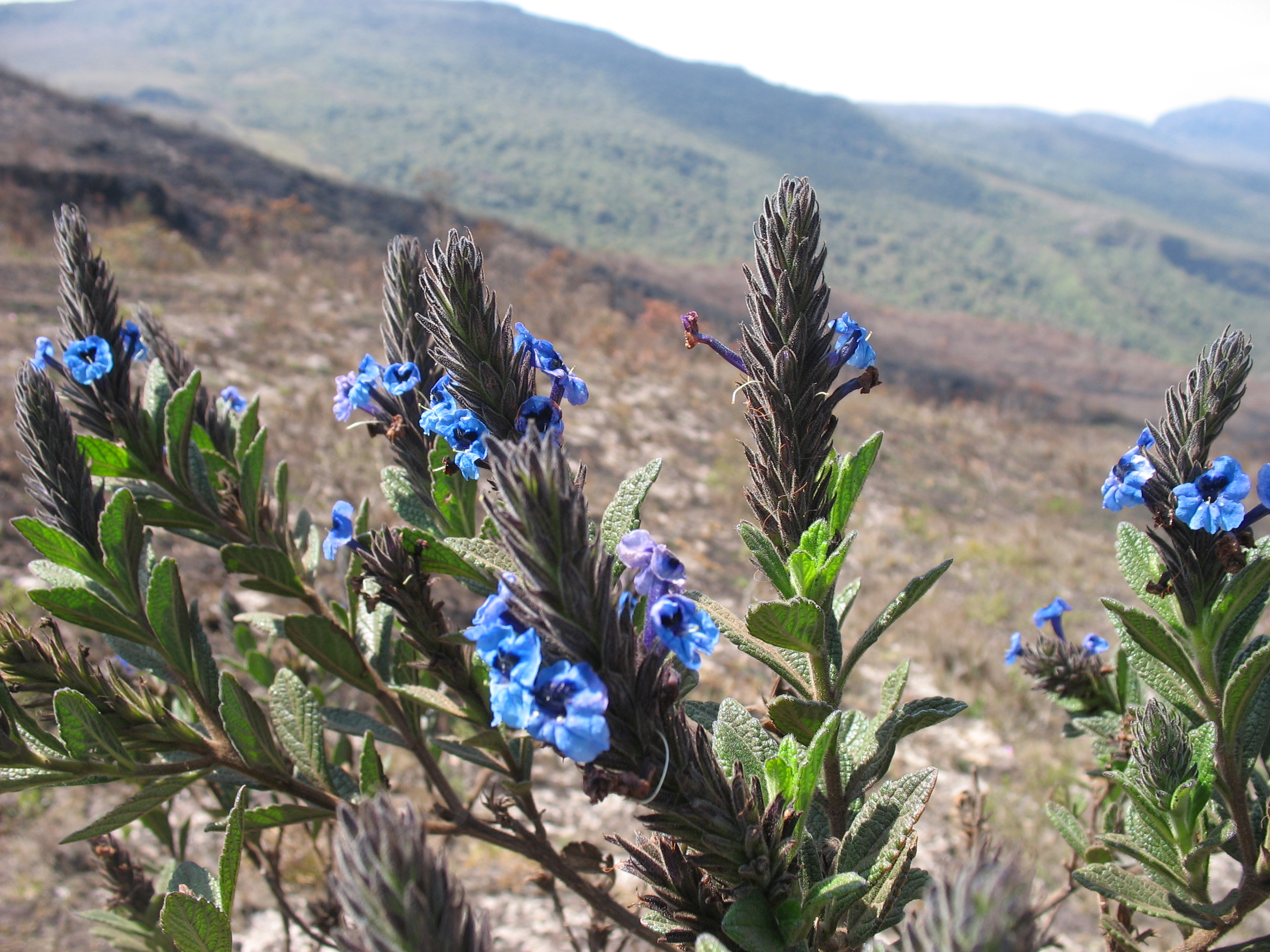
Stachytarpheta ajugifolia

The vegetation includes forms of rock fields, graminosos fields, savannas and forests, all in good state of preservation.

The following species found in the area have been identified with a vulnerable status ː Lychnophora pinaster, Dalbergia nigra, Ocotea odorífera, Melanoxylon brauna, Lychnophora ericoides, and Oncidium warmingii.

== Sources ==
- Augusto Barros, "A Serra", Aguas do Gandarela (in Portuguese), archived from the original on 2016-06-16
- Daniele Bragança (15 October 2014), "Gandarela: parque nacional já nasce recortado pela mineração", O Eco
- Governo federal cria e amplia unidades de conservação em Minas Gerais, Paraná, Amazonas e Pará (in Portuguese), Secretaria de Governo auxilia o Presidente da República, 14 October 2014, archived from the original on 2019-07-19
- Parna da Serra do Gandarela (in Portuguese), Chico Mendes Institute for Biodiversity Conservation, archived from the original on 2017-02-15
- PARNA de Serra do Gandarela (in Portuguese), ISA: Instituto Socioambiental
- Unidade de Conservação: Parque Nacional da Serra do Gandarela (in Portuguese), MMA: Ministério do Meio Ambiente
