= São José dos Pinhais =

- Municipality
- Municipality of São José dos Pinhais
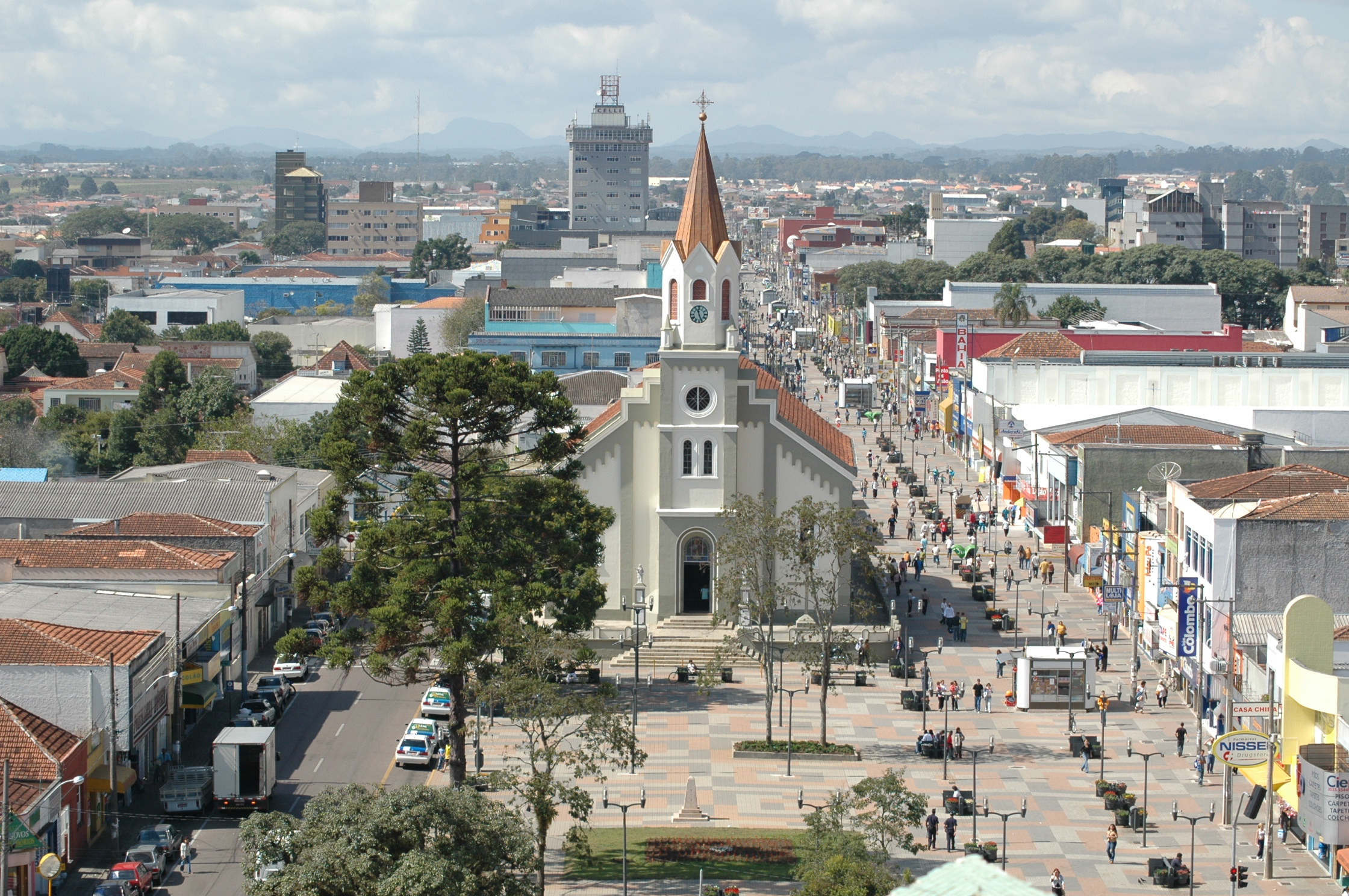
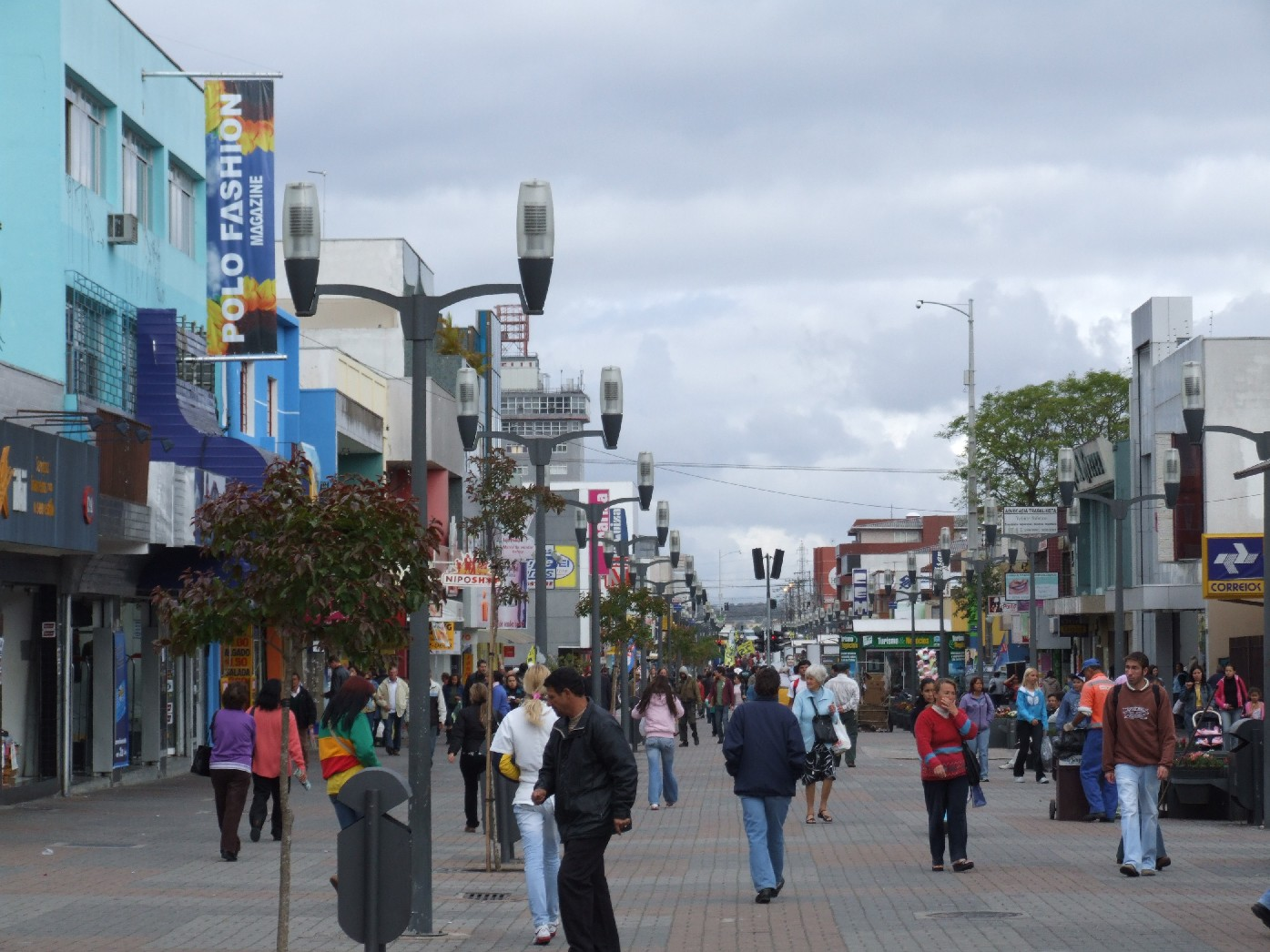
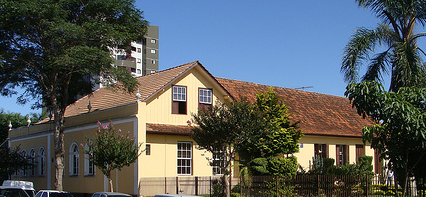
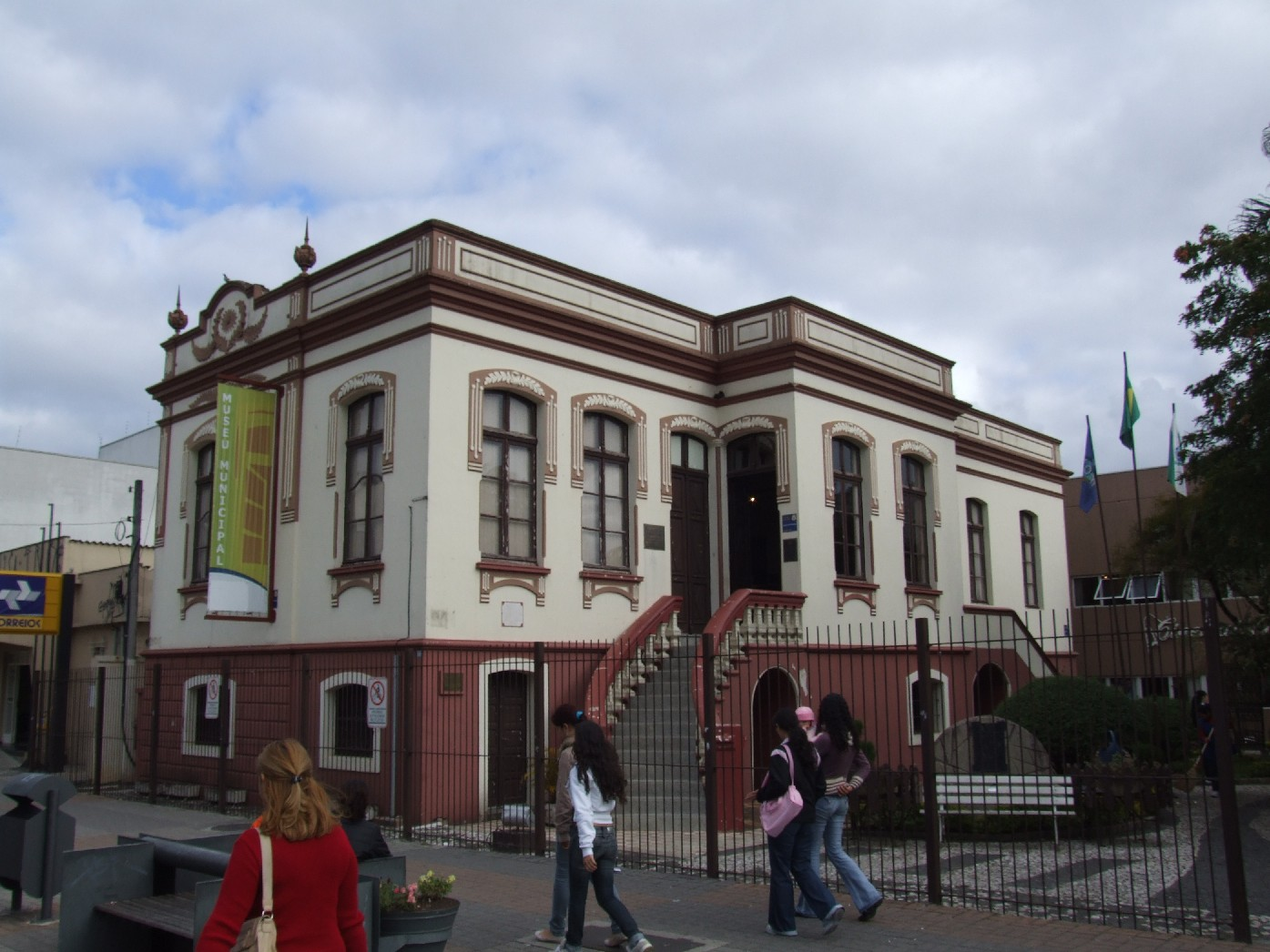
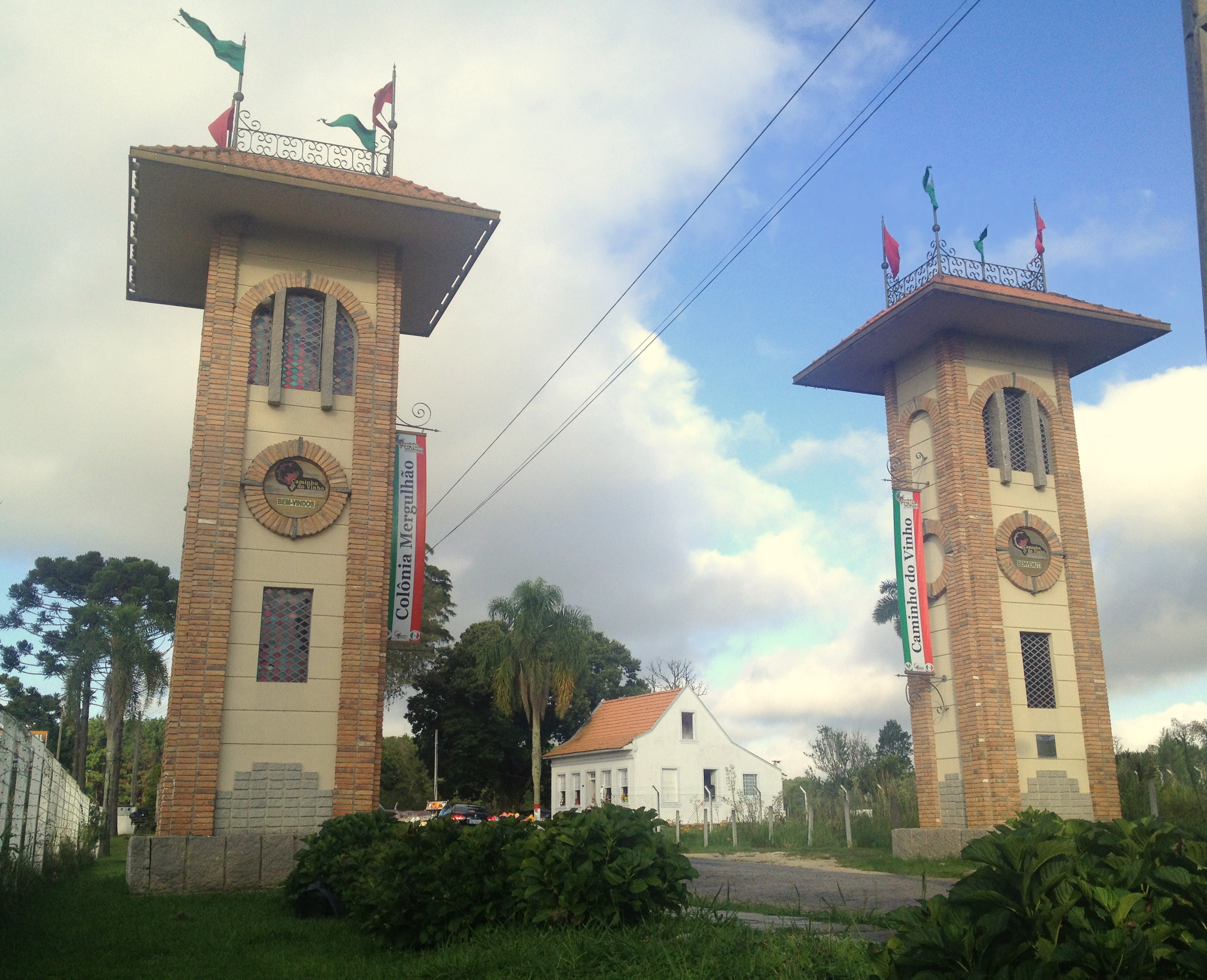
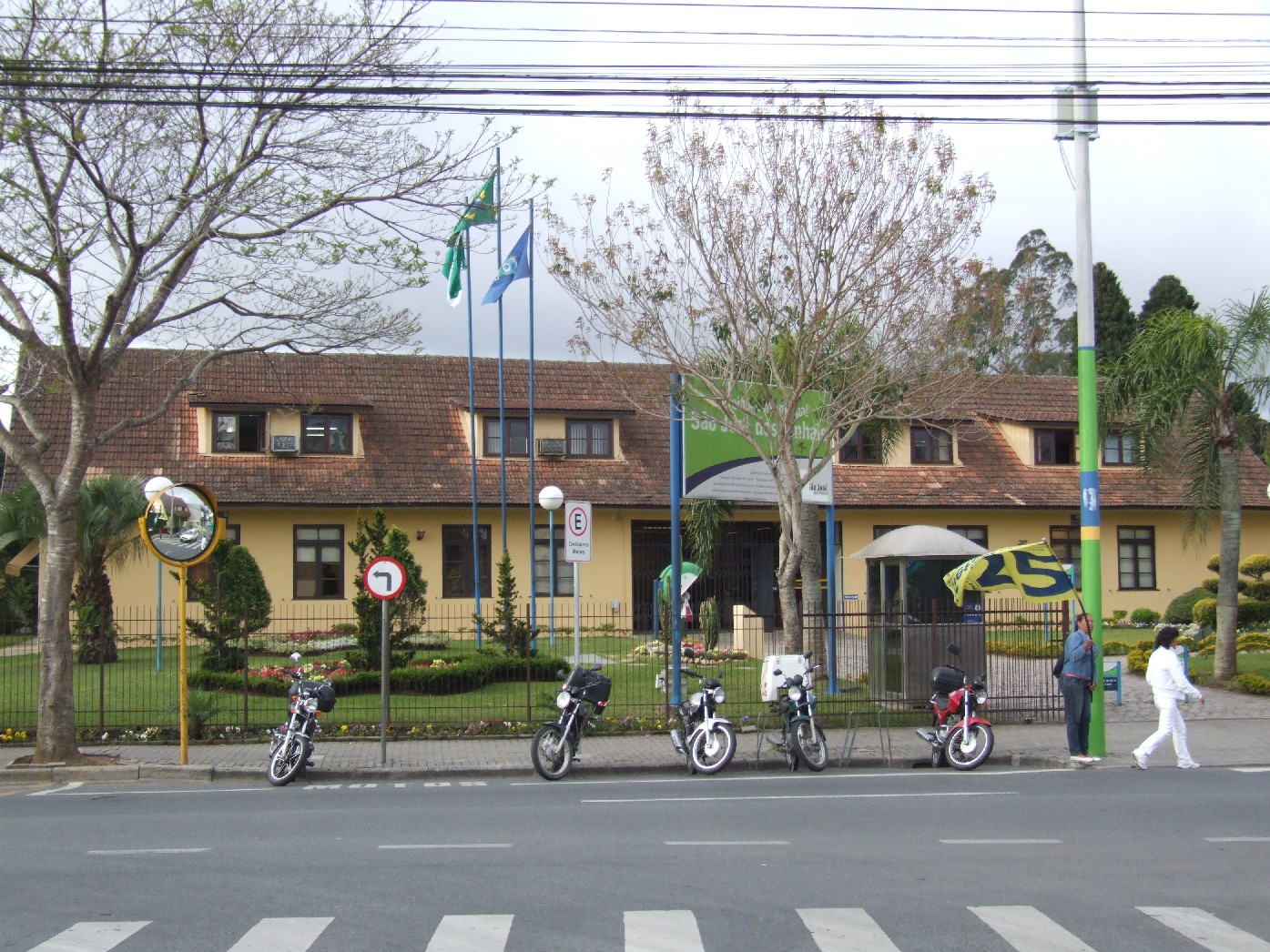

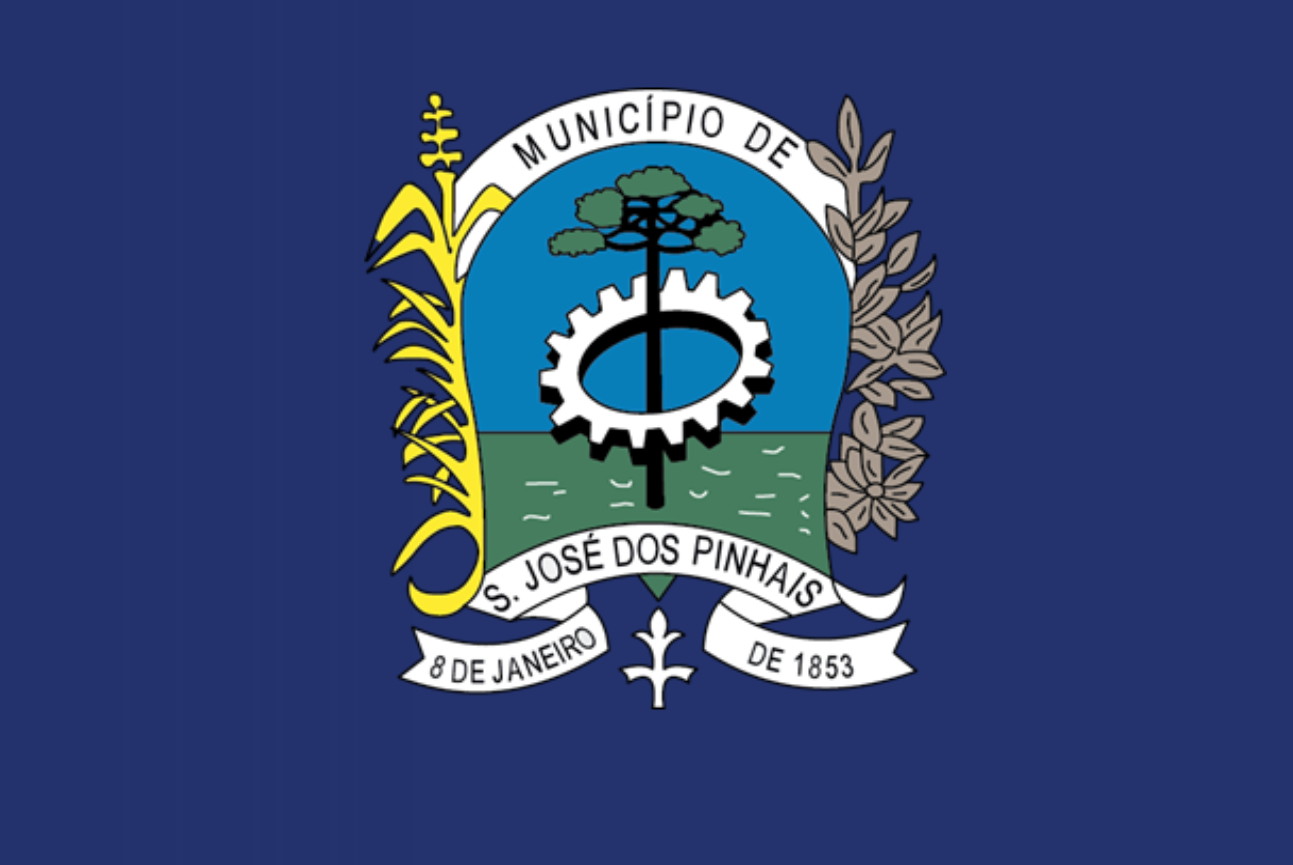
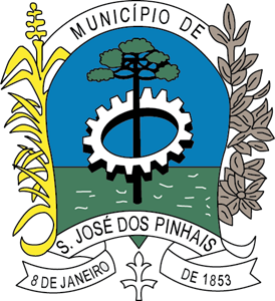
- Flag Coat of arms

- Location in Paraná

- Location in Brazil
- Coordinates: 25°32′6″S 49°12′21″W
- Country: Brazil
- Region: Southern
- State: Paraná

Area
  - Total: 946.435 km^{2} (365.421 sq mi)

Population (2022 Brazilian census)
  - Total: 329,628
  - Estimate (2025): 349,880
  - Density: 348.284/km^{2} (902.051/sq mi)
- Time zone: UTC-3 (UTC-3)
  - Summer (DST): UTC-2 (UTC-2)
- HDI (2010): 0.758 – high

São José dos Pinhais (Portuguese pronunciation: [sɐ̃w ʒuˈzɛ dos pĩˈɲajs]) is a municipality in the state of Paraná in Brazil. It is a part of the Metropolitan Region of Curitiba.

== Etymology ==
With geographical and religious origins the city's name is a homage to São José (Saint Joseph) and to the extense pine tree forests that used to cover the municipality territory ("pinhais").

== History ==
The creation of the municipality of São José dos Pinhais was made through the law No. 10 of the then province of São Paulo, on July 16, 1852. This law specified that the headquarters of the city would be called Villa of São José dos Pinhais, but the political establishment, with the installation of the City Council, occurred on January 8, 1853. On December 27, 1897, the village was finally elevated to city status. In 1958, Nereu Ramos (President of Brazil) died in a plane crash in the Colony Murici, close to São José dos Pinhais.

== Geography ==
=== Location ===
São José dos Pinhais is the second most populous of the meso and the population has grown rapidly in a short time: in 2000 there were approximately 196 000 inhabitants, in 2008 the number is over 280 000 inhabitants. São José dos Pinhais is the municipality with the fifth largest metropolitan region of Curitiba and the third in the Human Development Index (IDH in Portuguese). It has 21 districts, Guatupê being the most populated, with 16.743 inhabitants in 2010. It is the third pole of Brazil automotive, housing automakers Volkswagen, Audi, Nissan and Renault. It is also home to the Afonso Pena International Airport, the main air terminal in the Brazilian state of Paraná.

The municipality contains 12% of the 199,587 hectares (493,190 acres) Guaratuba Environmental Protection Area, created in 1992. It contains about 13% of the 49,287 hectares (121,790 acres) Guaricana National Park, created in 2014 to protect a mountainous area of Atlantic Forest.

== Sources ==
- PARNA Guaricana (in Portuguese), ISA: Instituto Socioambiental
