= Santa Bárbara, Minas Gerais =

Santa Bárbara
- Municipality
- Municipality of Santa Bárbara
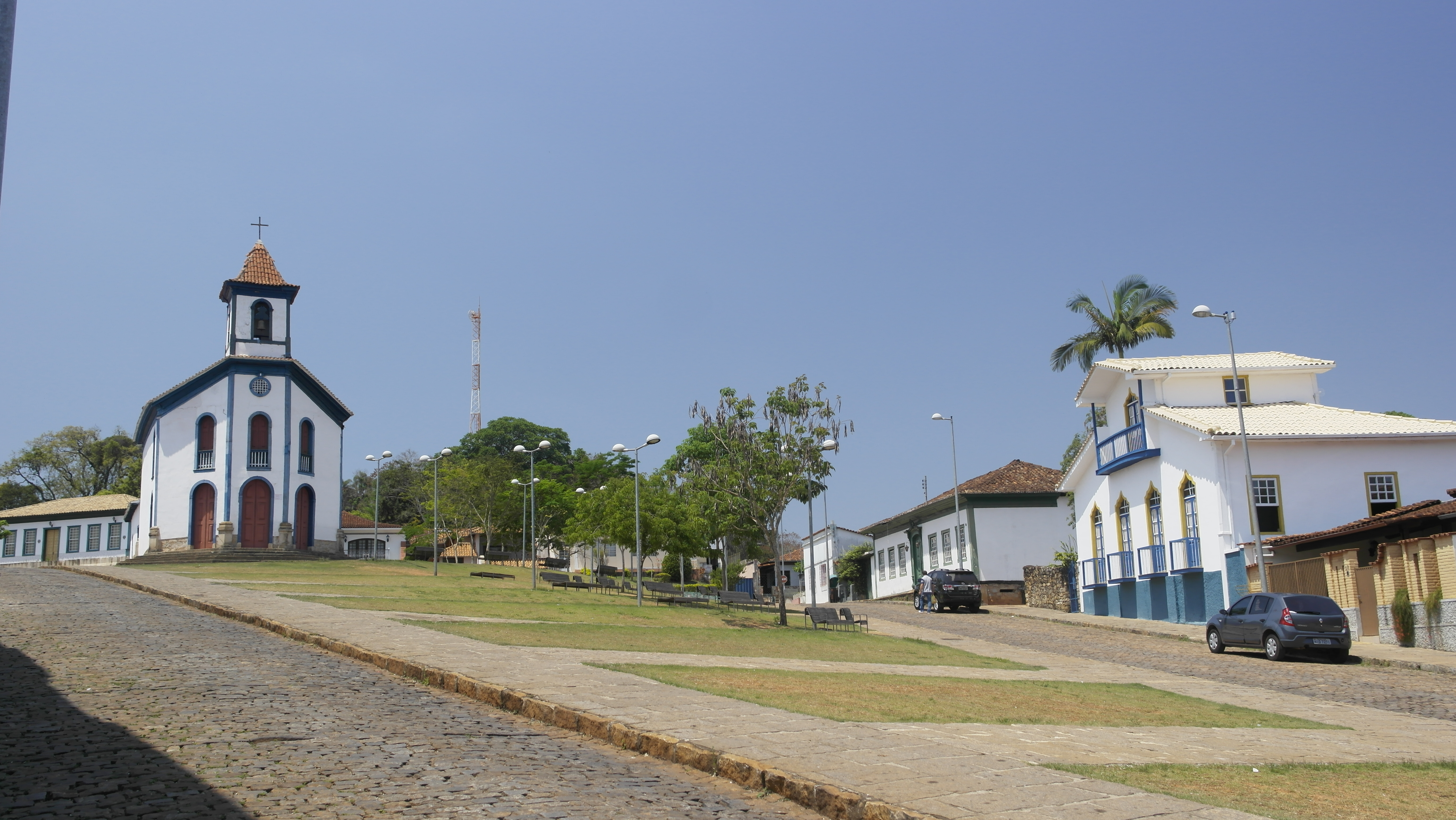
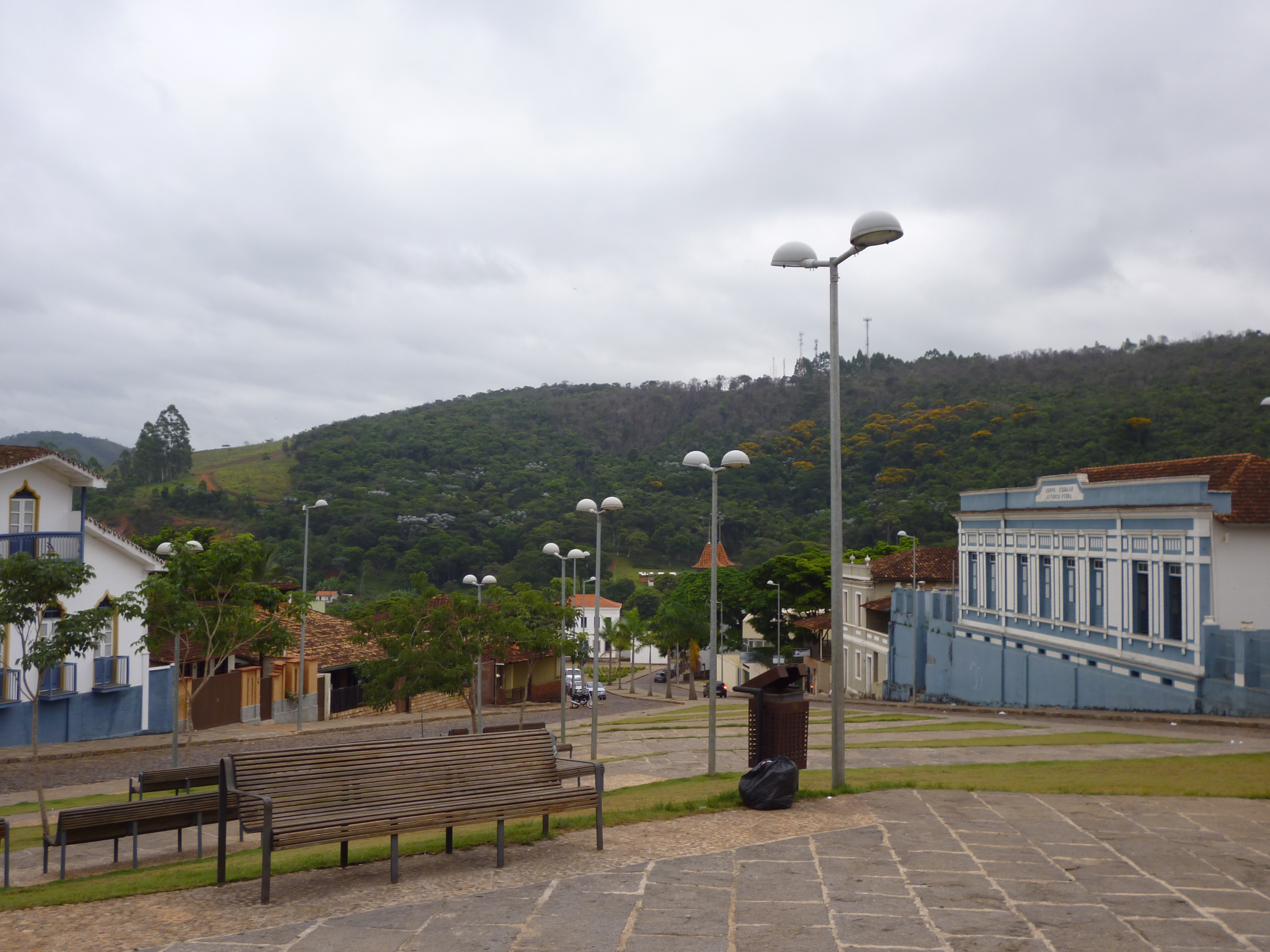
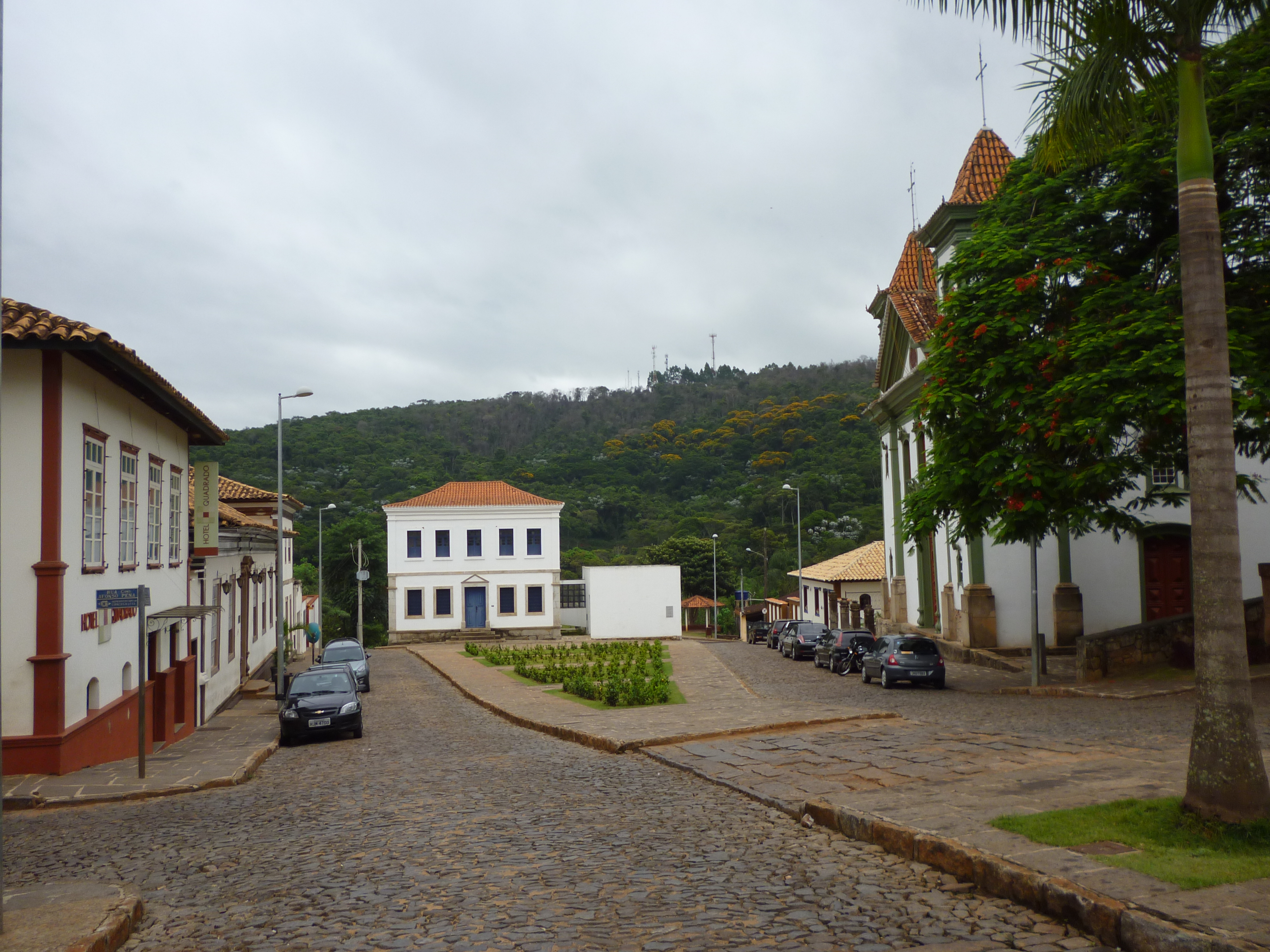
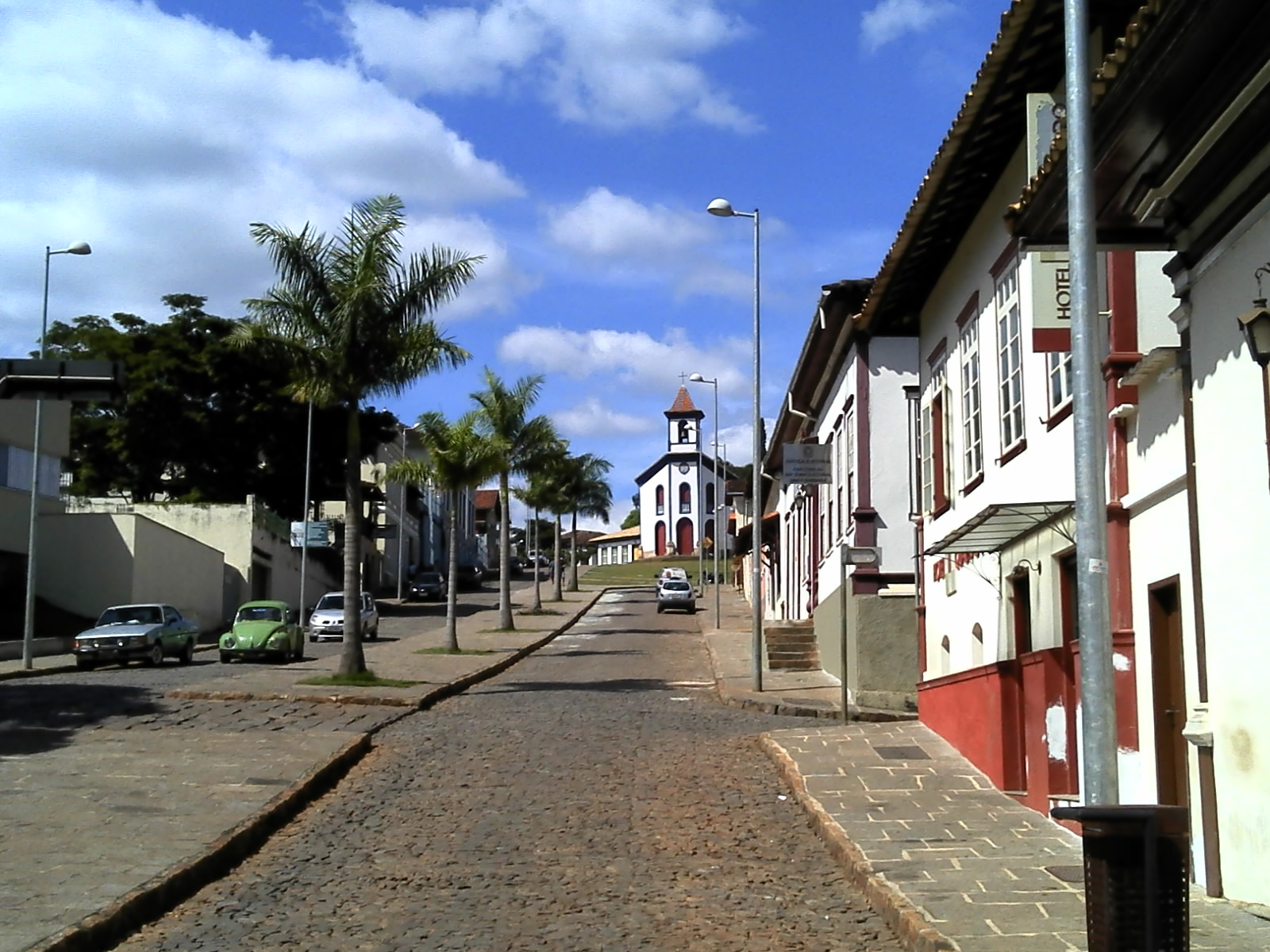
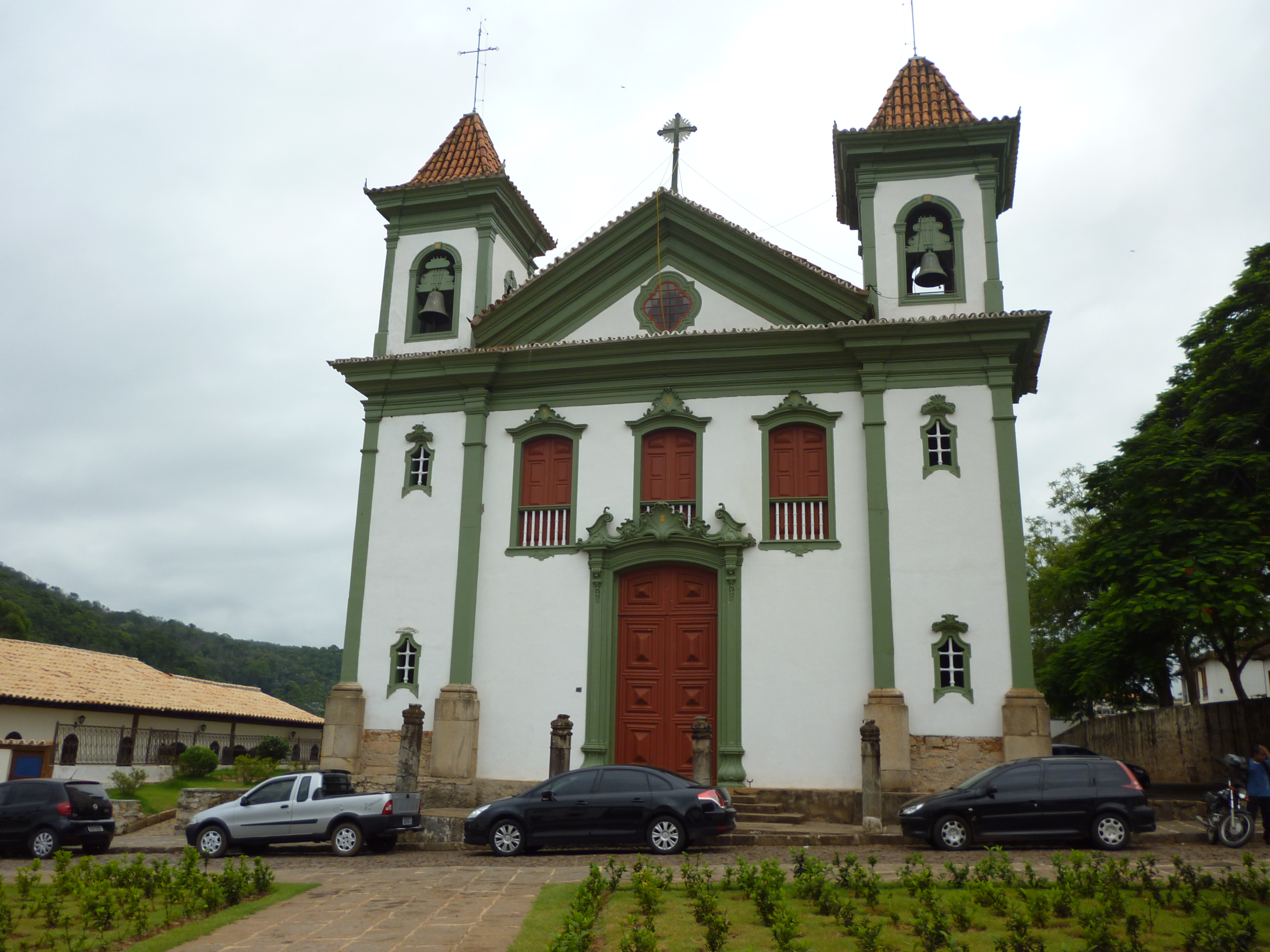

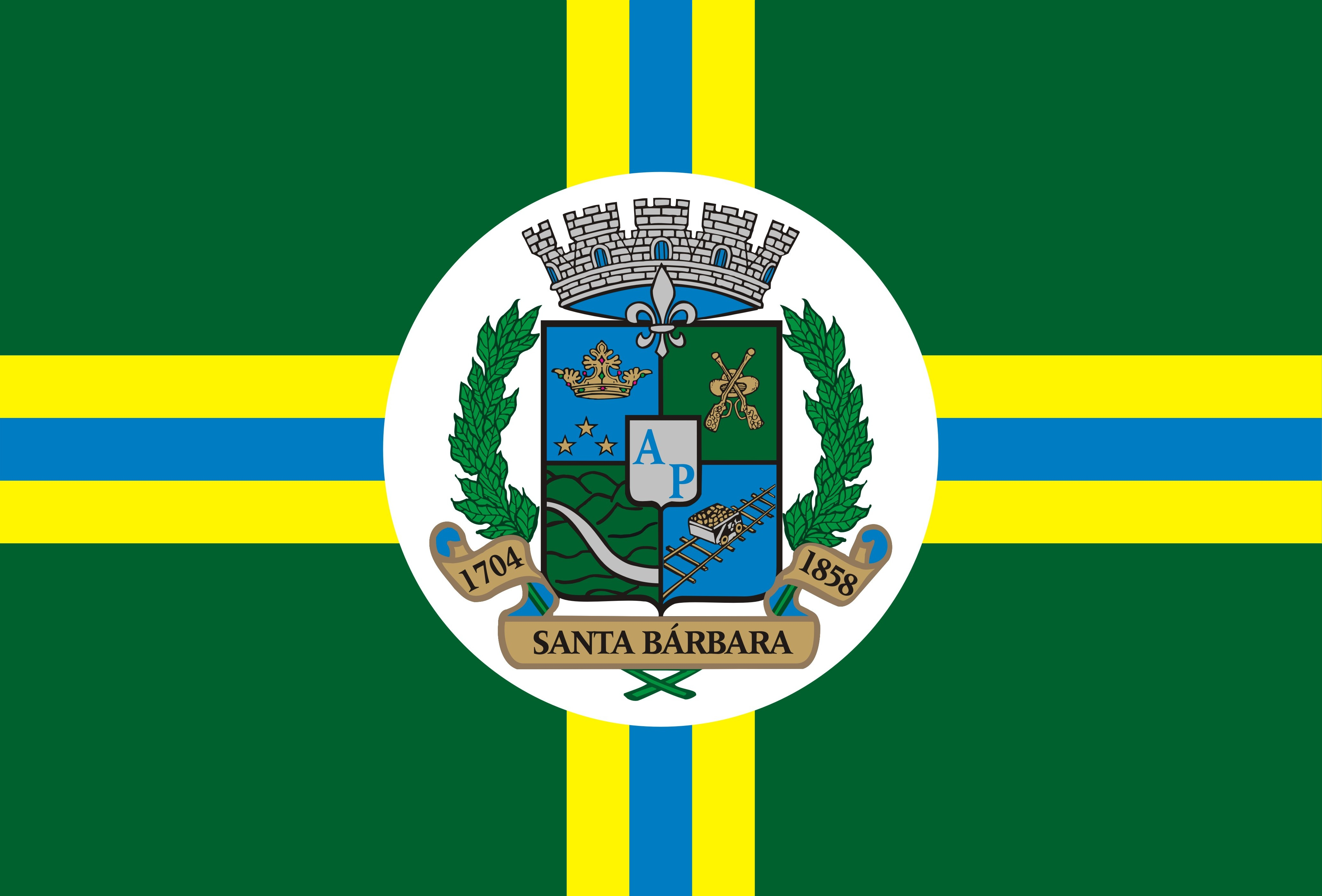
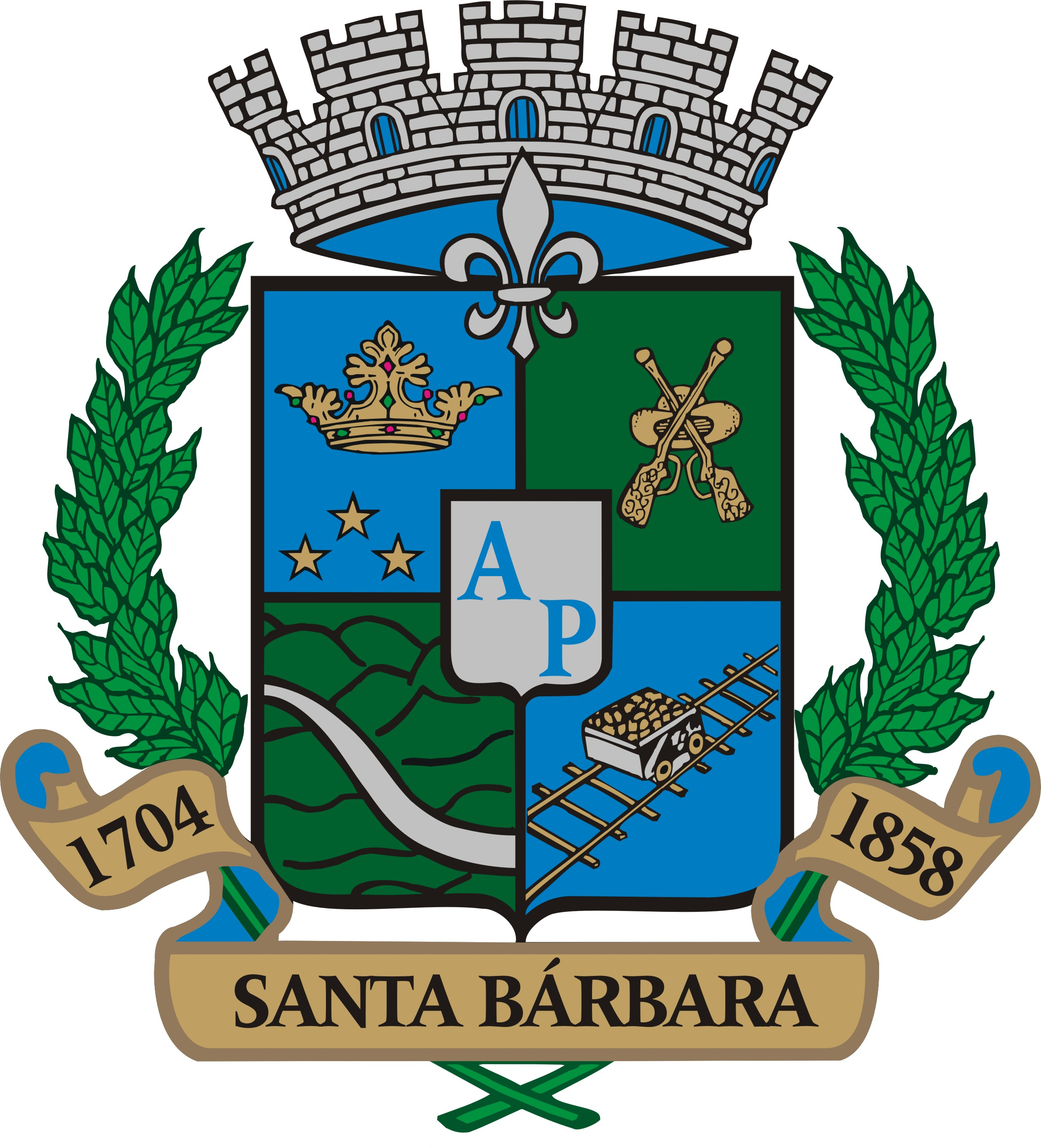
- Flag Coat of arms

- Localization of Santa Bárbara in Brazil
- Coordinates: 19°57′S 43°24′W
- Country: Brazil
- Region: Southeast
- State: Minas Gerais
- Founded: December 4, 1704
- Incorporated (as city): July 6, 1858

Government
  - Type: Mayor-council
  - Body: Prefeitura da Municipal de Santa Bárbara
  - Mayor: Leris Felisberto Braga (PRB) (2013-2016)

Area
  - Total: 684.20 km^{2} (264.17 sq mi)
- Elevation: 713 to 1,863 m (2,339 to 6,112 ft)

Population (2022 Census)
  - Total: 20,952
  - Estimate (2025): 21,787
  - Density: 407/km^{2} (1,050/sq mi)
  - Demonym: santabarbarense
- Time zone: UTC−3 (BRT)
- Postal Code: 35960-000
- Area code: (+55) 31
- HDI (2010): 0.707 – high
- Website: www.santabarbara.mg.gov.br

Santa Bárbara is a Brazilian municipality founded in 1704 and located in the state of Minas Gerais. It is a historic town on the Gold Circuit of Minas Gerais, located ninety-eight kilometres from Belo Horizonte, in the centre of the Estrada Real. The town is located at the foot of the Serra do Caraça. Despite the current increase in economic development, it is a peaceful and welcoming town with simple and hospitable people who preserve their traditions and live an active cultural life. The 6th President of Brazil, Afonso Pena was born in Santa Bárbara.

== History ==
It was established as "Hamlet of St. Anthony of the Santa Bárbara River" on December 4, 1704, by the pioneer Antônio Pereira, of São Paulo, who found there alluvial gold and lodes of precious stones. An interesting fact is that this pioneer founded the hamlet of Brumal just before then, and until today the anniversary of the district is commemorated on the eve of the municipality. In 1713 they started construction of the church of St. Anthony. Consequently, the city turned into an important passage in the route between the Corte, in Rio de Janeiro, and the central/northern mines of Minas Gerais. In 1817 it was visited by the expedition of naturalists Carl Friedrich Philipp von Martius and Johann Baptist von Spix in their passage through the jungle. It was elevated to town on March 15, 1839, and in 1858 to a county with the name "Santa Bárbara do Mato Dentro".

== Economy ==
Currently its economy is based on iron and gold mining. The city also produces honey and charcoal in large scale.

== Culture and tourism ==
The city's tourist attractions include some constructions from the 18th century including the church Matriz de Santa Bárbara which was dedicated to St. Anthony and built in 1724. It was made in colonial baroque style, and was recently renovated highlighting the ship's ceiling painted by master Manoel da Costa Ataíde.

The municipality contains about 45% of the 31,270 hectares (77,300 acres) Serra do Gandarela National Park, created in 2014.

== Education ==
The city was a pioneer in music education in public schools in Brazil, with the "Music in Schools" project. Portuguese is the official national language, and thus the primary language taught in schools. English and Spanish are both taught as second languages.

=== Educational institutions ===
Numbers:

- Public Schools: 22
- Private Schools: 4

== Sports ==
As in the rest of Brazil, football is the most popular sport among locals.

== Climate ==
The warmest month is February with an average temperature of 20 °C and the coldest is July with 13.6 °C. The mean annual temperature is 17.4 °C.

== Districts ==
Santa Bárbara has four districts: Florália, Barra Feliz, Brumal and Conceição do Rio Acima.
Besides these, the city also houses several subdistricts and rural communities: Sumidouro, Santana do Morro, Galego, Vigário da Vara, Cruz dos Peixotos, André do Mato Dentro, Barro Branco, Cachoeira de Florália, Mutuca and Costa Lacerda.

== See also ==
- List of municipalities in Minas Gerais
