= Matinhos =

- Município de Matinhos; The Municipality of Matinhos
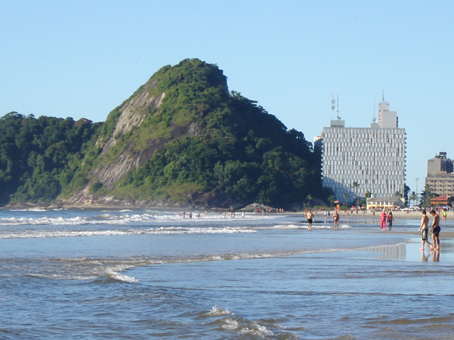

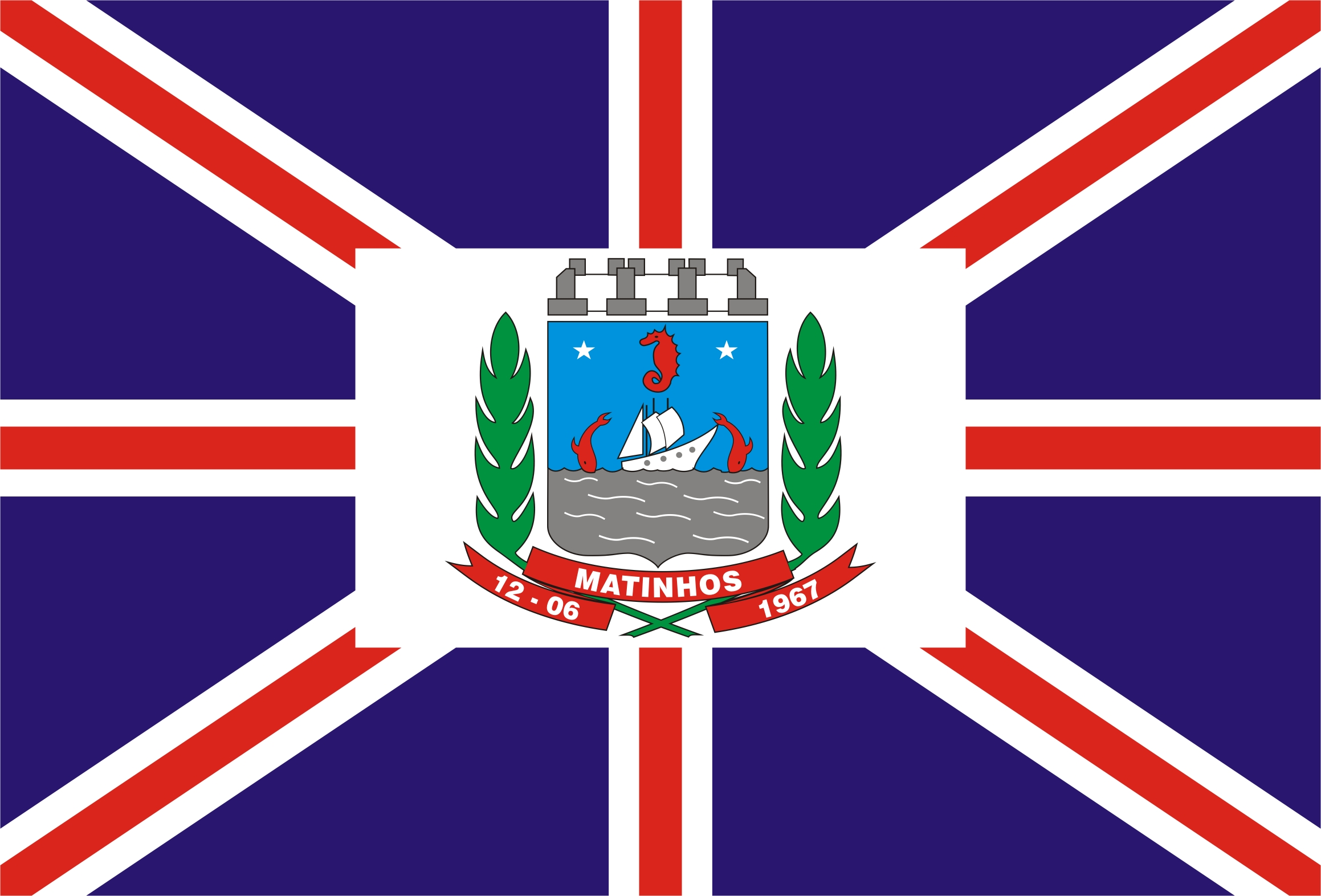
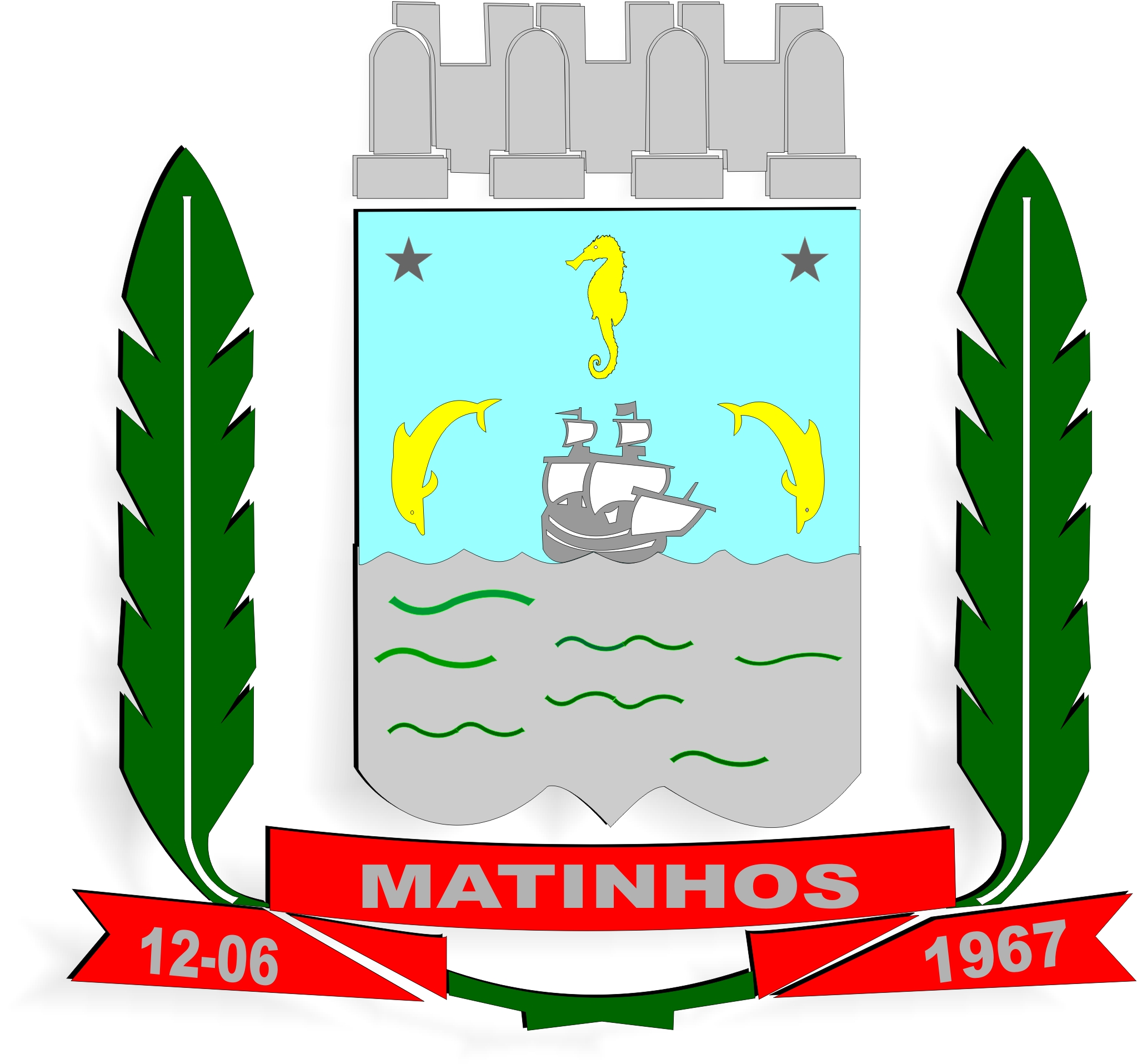
- Flag Coat of arms
- Nickname: A Namorada do Paraná
- Location of Matinhos in the Paraná

- Location in Brazil
- Coordinates: 25°49′S 48°32′W
- Country: Brazil
- Region: South
- State: Paraná
- Founded: June 12, 1967

Area
  - Total: 117.064 km^{2} (45.199 sq mi)
- Elevation: 3 m (9.8 ft)

Population (2020)
  - Total: 35,219
  - Density: 300.85/km^{2} (779.20/sq mi)
- Time zone: UTC−3 (BRT)
- Website: www.matinhos.pr.gov.br

Matinhos is a municipality in Brazil that arose in 1920s. It is considered the "Girlfriend of Paraná" as the date of its emancipation was June 12, Lovers' Day in Brazil.

== History ==
The colonization of Matinhos started in the mid-19th century, when the Carijó Indians used to live in the coastal part of Paraná, discovered in 1820 by French explorer Augustin Saint-Hilaire. The first name was Matinho, after a river in town, and the first colonists were Portuguese and Italians, who founded an agricultural colony.

In 1927 the "sea road" was inaugurated, connecting Paranaguá and Praia de Leste (Pontal do Paraná). It brought many families, mostly German, including the family of Augusto Blitzkow, responsible for the urbanization of Caiobá.

In August 1931 the region received a visit from the governor of Paraná, Carlos Cavalcanti, who went from Paranaguá to Caiobá in a wagon.

On January 27, 1951, by law n.613, Matinhos became a district belonging to Paranaguá, and on June 12, 1967, it became a municipality, no longer attached to Paranaguá.

The municipality contains the 1,660-hectare (4,100-acre) Rio da Onça State Park, created in 1984. It contains 1% of the 199,587-hectare (493,190-acre) Guaratuba Environmental Protection Area, created in 1992.

== Flag and anthem ==
In 1970 Professor Arcioné Antonio Peixoto Farias created the town's flag and coat of arms, which on March 13, 1970, under the law n.35/70, became official. In the 1970s Francisco Pereira da Silva wrote the lyrics of an anthem for Matinhos, and Angelo Antonélo composed the music.
