= Guaratuba =

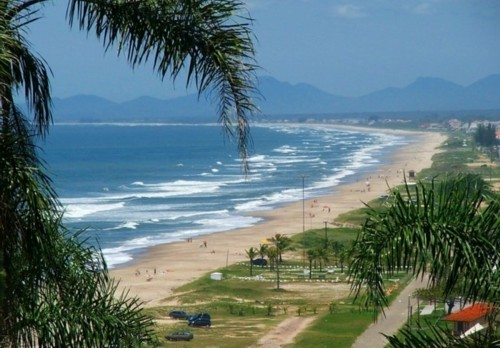
- Beach of Brejatuba

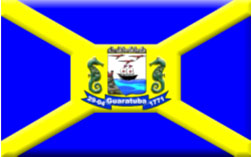
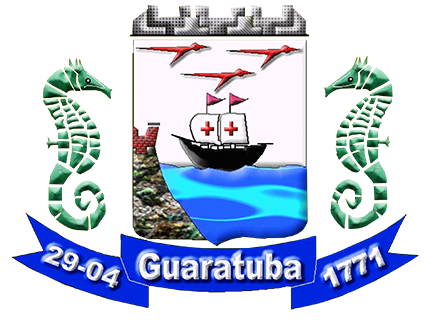
- Flag Coat of arms

- Location in Paraná
- Coordinates: 25°54′S 48°34′W
- Country: Brazil
- State: Paraná

Area
  - Total: 1,325.883 km^{2} (511.926 sq mi)
- Lowest elevation: 0 m (0 ft)

Population (2005)
  - Total: 34,100
  - Density: 25.7/km^{2} (66.6/sq mi)
- Time zone: UTC−3 (BRT)

Guaratuba is a city in the state of Paraná, Brazil, It was founded in 1765.

== History ==
The King of Portugal, Dom Jose I, worried about possible foreign raids on the Brazilian coast, commanded that villages and towns be established in more suitable locations to the projecting or dispersed small farms where the conditions were favourable. It was decided that a town should be founded between the villages of Paranaguá and of the River San Francisco. On 5 December 1765, Dom Luis sent a group of settlers to begin building the town. This comprised 200 couples, who would cultivate discovered lands. Thus Guaratuba began to take shape. In July 1766, the Conde de Oeiras directed Dom Luis praising, on behalf of the King, the projects to establish the population in the cove of Guaratuba and informed him that the King wished that the new village bear his name, S. Luis.

On 13 May 1768, Dom Luis granted the royal charter requested by the founder of the new town which consisted of the creation and maintenance of a church. Dom Luis, on 23 January 1770, commanded his assistant lieutenant-colonel Alfonso Botelho de Sampaio e Sousa, who erected in village the small farm called Guaratuba, where there were already houses and other buildings. After some expeditions, on 27 April 1771, Dom Luis returned to Guaratuba. On the 28th day of that month, the church was blessed and on the 29th the village of São Luís de Guaratuba was formally named. On 30 April 1771, the first city council was elected with the approval of the founder of the village and the provincial governor. The councillors thenceforth guided the fortunes citizens of Guaratuba, subject to the authority of the provincial governor (up to 1854 Paraná belonged to the province of São Paulo), until the declaration of the republic, when a new political system canme into effect. Its first elected mayor took office in 1792, thus continuing up to 20 October 1838, when by the Act No. 7572, the city ceased to exist in its former status and was constituted as the municipality of Paranaguá. It was not until 10 October 1847, by the Act No. 02 of that year, that the city regained its independence, being reinstalled on 25 of October of the same year. In this new phase, the first mayor was Mr. Berilo da Cunha Padilha. In 1954, the city of Guaratuba became part of the Jurisdiction of Sao Jose dos Pinhais. Finally in July 1986 Guaratuba obtained municipal independence.

== Geography ==
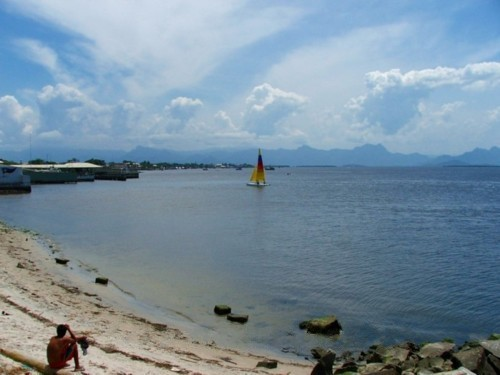
Bay of Guaratuba

The Guaratuba name means "many guarás". This name was conceived by the natives who inhabited this region at the time of the discovery of Brazil by the Portuguese people. Guará is the name of a bird of red plumage that existed in abundance in this area and even though protected by the authorities, they became extinct. Tuba means extreme amount in the aboriginal language.

The municipality contains 67% of the 199,587-hectare (493,190-acre) Guaratuba Environmental Protection Area, created in 1992. It contains the 6,052-hectare (14,950-acre) Boguaçu State Park, created in 1998. It also contains about 67% of the 49,287-hectare (121,790-acre) Guaricana National Park, created in 2014 to protect a mountainous area of Atlantic Forest. It contains the Lagoa do Parado Municipal Nature Park, which protects an area of marshland rich in biodiversity.

== Geographic position ==
The geographic position of Guaratuba is the following: Altitude - 6 meters, Latitude - 25° 52', Longitude - 48° 34'. The city is situated in a peninsular, arenaceous plain, facing the bay at the Northwest, and another front in the Atlantic Ocean at the Southeast.

== Climate ==
The climate of Guaratuba is subtropical and humid, without definite dry station.

== Economy ==
Agriculture, fishing, and the tourism constitutes the basic economic activities of the city. Guaratuba has fertile lands where maize, sugar cane, rice, oranges, ginger and bananas, and many other products are of great economic importance. The cattle is distinguished with a considerable herd of buffaloes. Fishing also has great prominence in the economy of city, being one of its main sources of wealth, being made in an artisan way. Even with its fishing being done in artisan way, the technology already is present in 80% of this activity operating with a fishing industry. Two industries of palmito still exists in Guaratuba that are marks in Brazil and the exterior. The tourism also constitutes excellent source of profit for the city. Tourists from many different places in Brazil and the world visit annually its 27 km of beaches.

== Demography ==
With an estimated population of 34,100, Guaratuba is the second largest city of the Paraná coast, second only to Paranaguá.

== Highways ==
The main highways are: BR-376 (it binds Curitiba to the South of Brazil) and PR-412 (it binds Pontal do Paraná to Guaratuba).

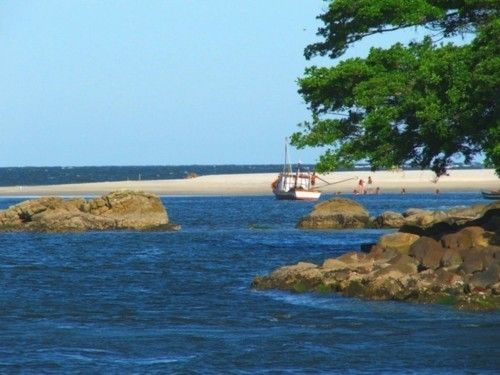
Caieiras

== Beaches ==
=== Caieiras Beach ===
The Caieiras beach is located between the tip of the Johnnser and the rocks of the Caieiras, it has an extension of 1 km, and is used for a community of fishermen. A curiosity on this beach is a Paraguayan steamer that sunk when it escaped from the Brazil-Paraguay war.

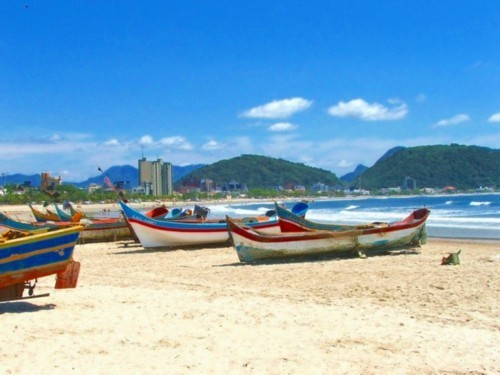
Beach of the Christ

=== Hotel Beach ===
The Hotel beach is initiated in the rocks of the Caieiras until the Hotel; its extension is in format of a half moon and follows to the Mount of the Christ.

=== Central beach ===
The Central beach starts in the Beach of the Hotel and goes until the Mount of the Christ, forming the Turkish Beach, the fishermen beach and the Beach of the Christ.

=== Brejatuba Beach ===
The Brejatuba beach is located to the south of the Mount of the Christ, in its extension receives many names. It is good for bath, surf and fishing.

=== Prainha ===
Prainha is located in the tip of Caiobá, before the passage of the bay.

== Sources ==
- PARNA Guaricana (in Portuguese), ISA: Instituto Socioambiental
