= Manuel Preto =

Portuguese bandeirante (died 1630)

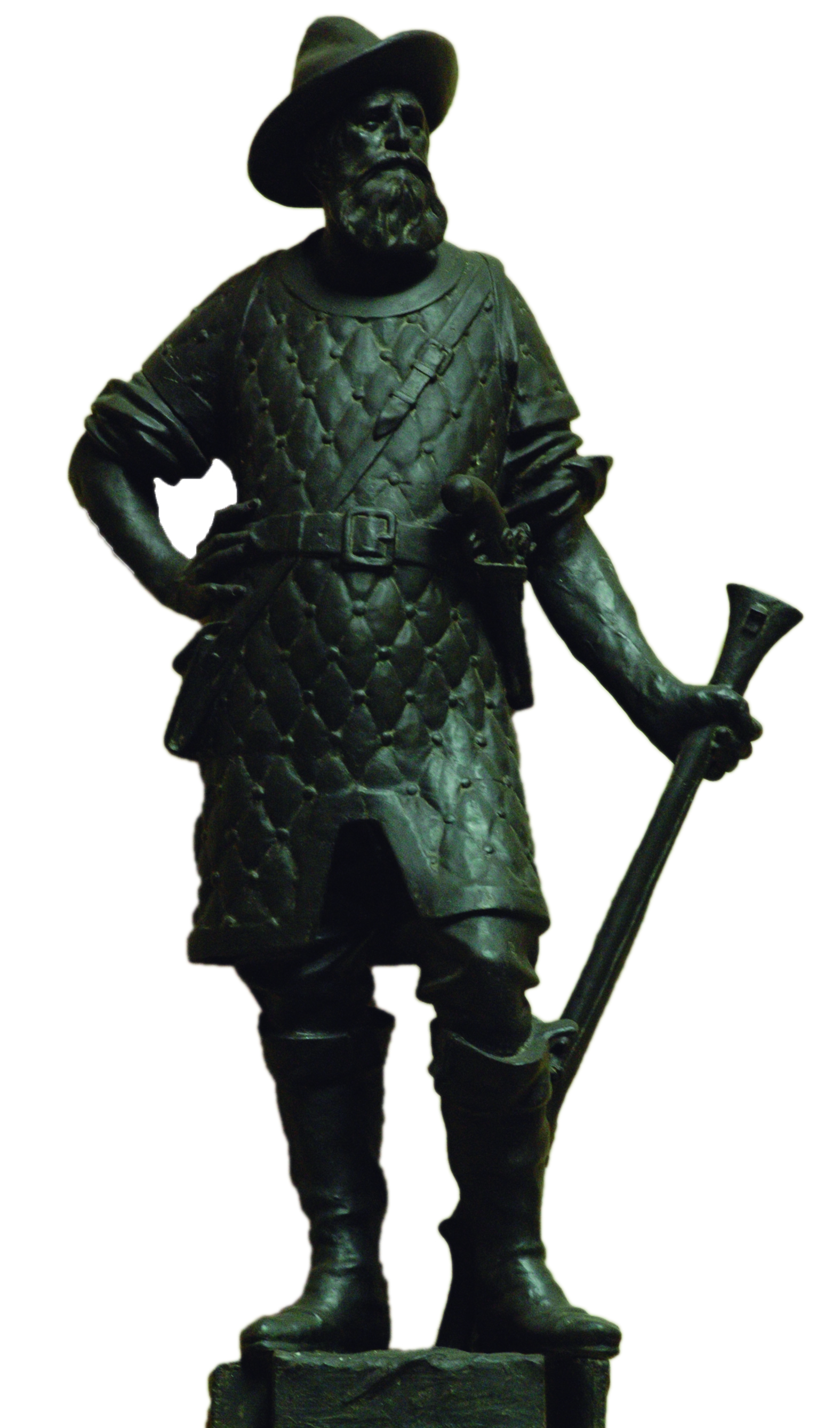
Manuel Preto, sculpture by Adrien Henri Vital van Emelen, at the Museu Paulista.

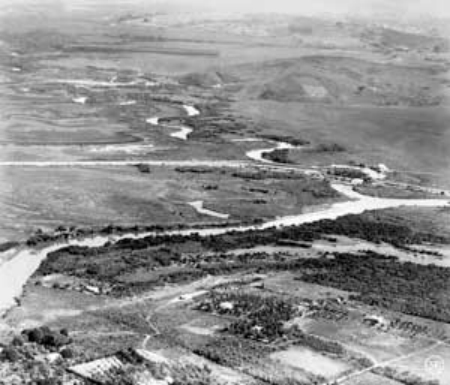
Rio Tietê, near the Parish of Ó

Manuel Preto was a Portuguese bandeirante from São Paulo, born in the second half of the 16th century, who died in 1630. He was the son of António Preto, who joined the armada of Diego Flórez de Valdés in 1582. He inherited a piece of land from his parents northwest of the village center, which would become the current neighborhood of Freguesia do Ó.

== History ==
One of the most famous 17th century sertanistas (backwoodsmen) of São Paulo, Preto hunted and enslaved indigenous people while still a teenager in the Nicolau Barreto militia. The Genealogia Paulistana calls him a

...fearless explorer, who penetrated the interior of the Rio Grande (River Paraná in the Castilian maps, those of the Paraguay river and its province, reaching the Uruguay river in conquest of wild Indians, and even arrested so many that in its cultural farm founded in 1580 in the chapel of Nossa Senhora da Expectação do Ó had 999 Indian bows and arrows. He founded this chapel between 1610 and 1615 (today the parish of Ó).

Taking 155 enslaved Indians, he left by the Tamanduateí River, entering by the Tietê River, to the border of his own lands. In 1606 he toured the Guairá and, on his return from Vila Real do Espírito Santo, gathered peaceful Temimino Tupi, and brought them to São Paulo. In subsequent years he returned to the same places.

In 1610 he applied to the religious authority of the colony for authorization to erect a chapel in honor of Nossa Senhora do Ó (Our Lady of Ó).

In 1619 the militia of which he was field master assaulted the Jesuits of Jesús María, Córdoba, St. Ignatius and Loreto. In 1623, with his brother Sebastião Preto, as field master Manuel Preto took his banners to the so-called Guayrá, sertão dos abueus, with the participation of the already old bandeirantes Francisco de Alvarenga (1602) and Pedro Vaz de Barros They destroyed Jesuit reductions (reduções: settlements for native peoples established and overseen by the Jesuits), and captured many indigenous slaves. As field master, Manuel Preto in 1626 was prosecuted as the leader of raids into the sertão and violence in the field, and prevented from exercising the position of councilor to which he had been elected.

In the second half of 1628 he left São Paulo as field master and captain-major, with Antonio Raposo Tavares as his first mate. They annihilated the thirteen Jesuit reductions of the Guayrá, and captured about 100,000 natives. According to historian Afonso d'Escragnolle Taunay, Jesuit authors have interpreted "some field masters" at Foz do Iguaçu "gathering with a large train" to mean many thousands of captives, which seems unlikely. It would be a thousand, at most two thousand, prisoners. The Jesuits tried in vain to take measures from Bahia, then decided to move what was left of their Guairian reductions far to the south in an immense transmigration effort.

The captaincy's grantee, D. Alvaro Pires de Castro e Souza, Count of Monsanto, considered Preto's services so valuable that he rewarded him with the rank of governor of the islands of Ilha de Santana and Santa Catarina.

Preto's death in the sertão backcountry, victim of an arrow in an ambush, was reported in São Paulo on 22 July 1630. He had gone into the bush earlier in the year.

Preto was seen as a man of casually violent action against the Indians and their superiors, especially disregarding the Jesuits Simão Masseta, José Cataldino and Antonio Ruiz de Montoya. He also destroyed reductions in Ivaí, Tibagi and Uruguay.
