= Pedro Leopoldo =

Municipality of Brazil

Coordinates: 19°37′04″S 44°02′34″W

Location of Pedro Leopoldo within Minas Gerais

Pedro Leopoldo is a Brazilian municipality in the state of Minas Gerais. The city is located in the Greater Belo Horizonte region. According to the most recent census of the Brazilian Institute of Geography and Statistics, the population of the city was 62,580 in 2022 Census. The city is birthplace to prominent medium Chico Xavier and 1970 World Champion and Cruzeiro footballer Dirceu Lopes.

The municipality contains 44% of the 2,004 hectares (4,950 acres) Sumidouro State Park, created in 1980. The Casa Fernão Dias is in the Quinta do Sumidouro district of Pedro Leopoldo. It is listed by the State Institute of Historic and Artistic Heritage (IEPHA) as a cultural heritage monument. It contain exhibits that tell the history of Fernão Dias, a bandeirante who spent several years in the region with his followers in search of gold and precious stones. The house contains an annex where the state park's administrative staff work.

== See also ==
- List of municipalities in Minas Gerais
