= Bandeirantes (disambiguation) =

Bandeirante, Portuguese for 'scout', may refer to:

== Brazilian sports clubs ==
- Clube Atlético Bandeirante, a Brazilian football (soccer) club
- Bandeirante Esporte Clube, a Brazilian football (soccer) club
- Bandeirante Futebol Clube, a Brazilian football (soccer) club
- Esporte Clube Dom Pedro Bandeirante, a Brazilian football (soccer) club
- União Bandeirante Futebol Clube, a Brazilian football (soccer) club

== Places in Brazil ==
- Bandeirantes, Mato Grosso do Sul
- Bandeirante, Santa Catarina
- Bandeirantes do Tocantins
- Bandeirantes, Paraná
- Bandeirantes do Norte River

== Other uses ==
- Bandeirantes, Portuguese-Brazilian colonial slavers and fortune hunters
- Os Bandeirantes, 1960 French-Brazilian adventure film
- Embraer EMB 110 Bandeirante, a small turbo-prop passenger aircraft
- J40 Bandeirante, a version of the Toyota Land Cruiser
- Rede Bandeirantes, a broadcast television network in Brazil
- Rádio Bandeirantes, a radio station of the Rede Bandeirantes
- Federação de Bandeirantes do Brasil, the Girl Scouts of Brazil
- Rodovia dos Bandeirantes, a highway in the State of São Paulo, Brazil
- Bandeirantes Avenue, a large thoroughfare in the city of São Paulo
- Monument to the Bandeiras, a monument to the groups of bandeirantes that departed from the city of São Paulo
- Palácio dos Bandeirantes, the state governor's official residence in the city of São Paulo
- Bandeirantes Anthem, the official anthem of the State of São Paulo
- Colégio Bandeirantes de São Paulo, a private school in the city of São Paulo
- Transportes Aéreos Bandeirantes, or TABA, was a Brazilian airline
- Boana bandeirantes, a frog in the family Hylidae, endemic to Brazil
- Núcleo Bandeirante, an administrative region in Brasília, the Federal District in Brazil
- Bandeirante University of São Paulo (UNIBAN), a private university in São Paulo, Brazil
- Recreio dos Bandeirantes, a neighborhood in the city of Rio de Janeiro
