= Dom Lustosa =

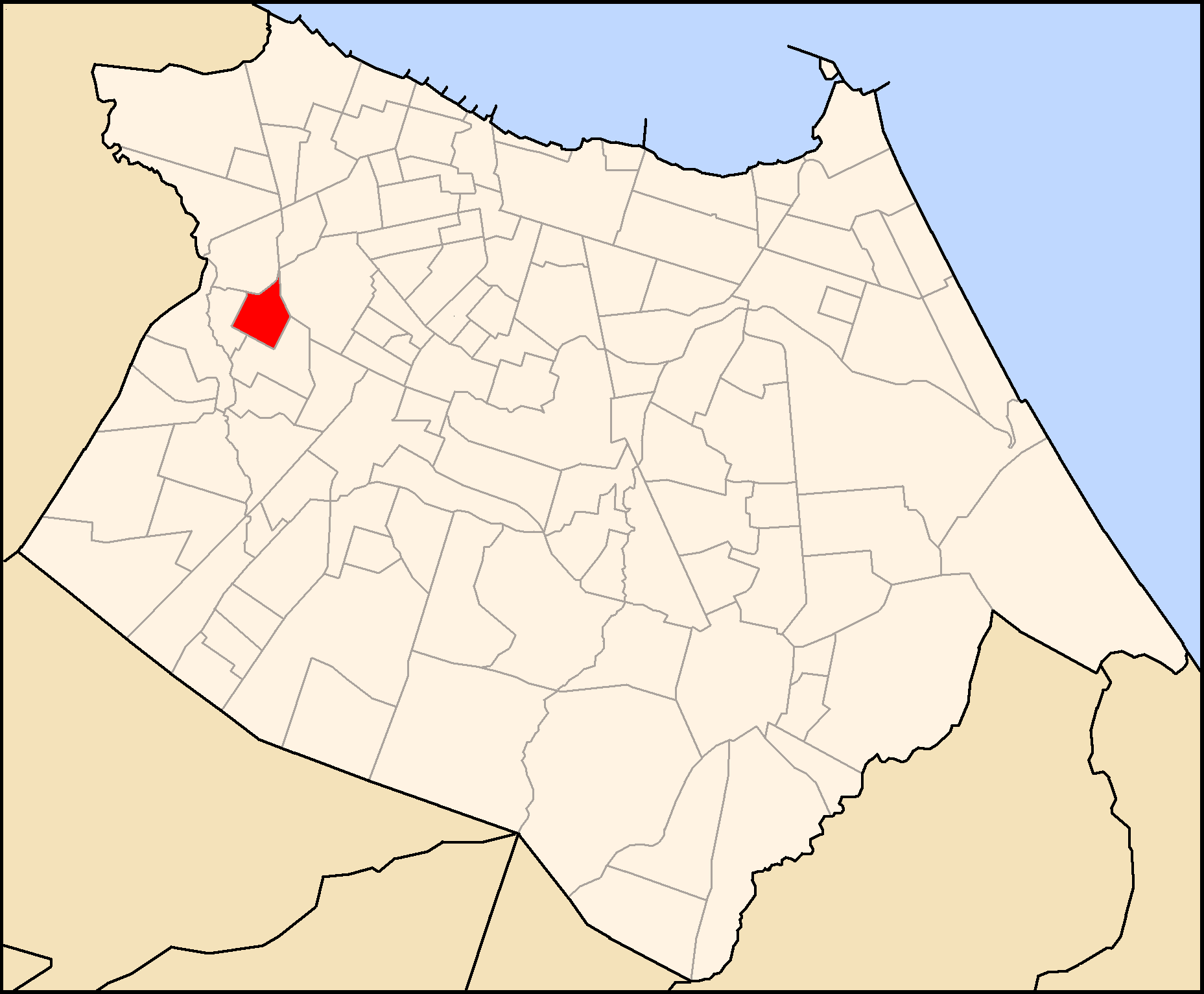
Location of the neighborhood in Fortaleza

Dom Lustosa Portuguese pronunciation: ['dõw luʃ'tɔzɐ] is a neighborhood in the western zone of Fortaleza–CE, in the Northeast Region of Brazil, which until 2020 was part of the Regional Executive Office III (Portuguese: SER – Secretaria Executiva Regional III). After 2020, under decree No. 14,899 it became part of Territory 37, in Region 11.

The neighborhood is delimited by the Alagadiço Creek in the north, the Senador Fernandes Tavora Avenue in the south, the Coronel Matos Dourado Avenue in the east and the Cardeal Arcoverde, bordering Autran Nunes, in the west. There are two private schools; named for Fernão Dias and Getúlio Vargas, and four public schools, Justiniano de Serpa, Ayrton Senna, Paulo Freire and Waldemar Alcantara.

== Photos gallery ==
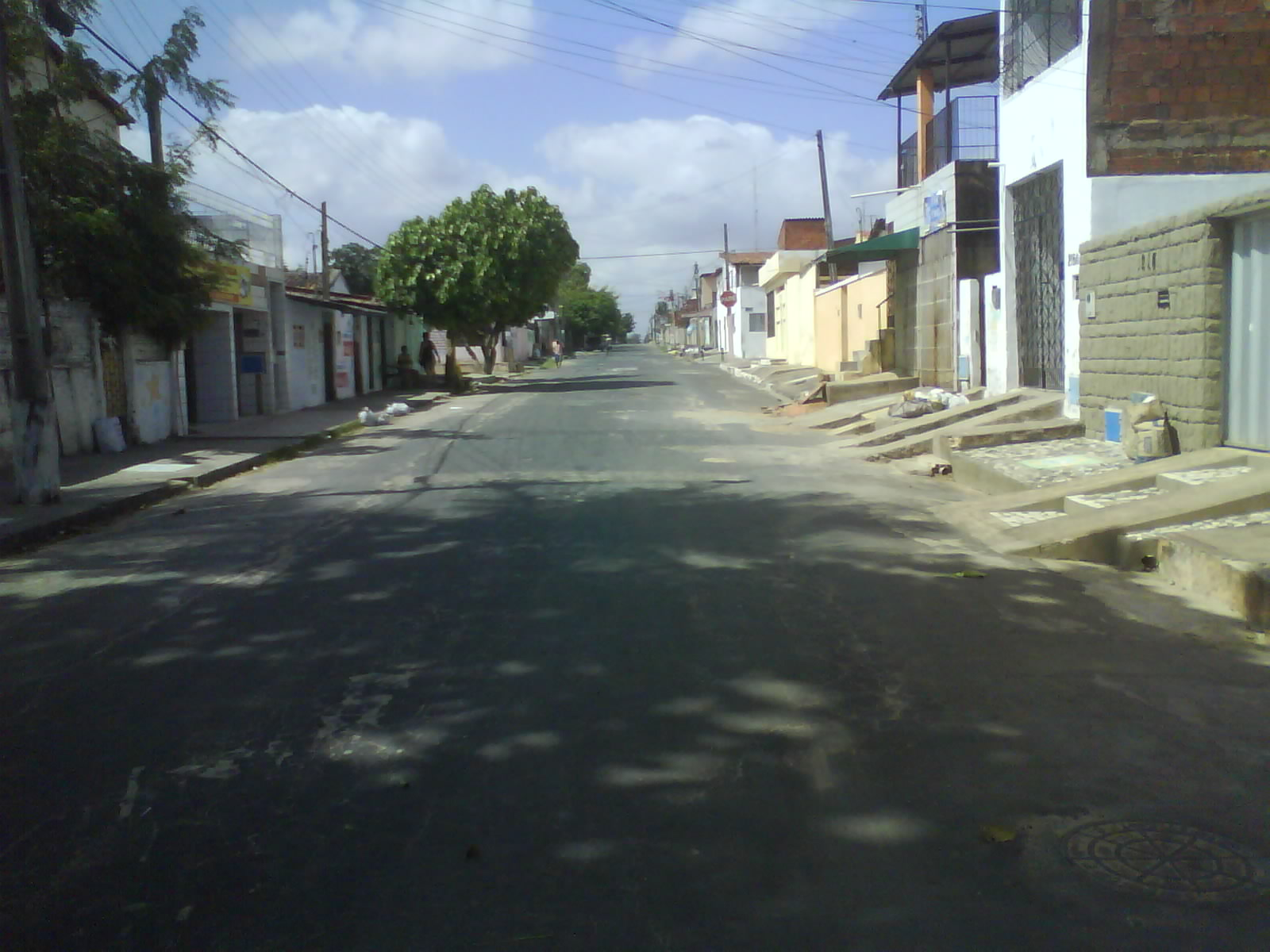
Eurico Medina Street, one of the first in the neighborhood

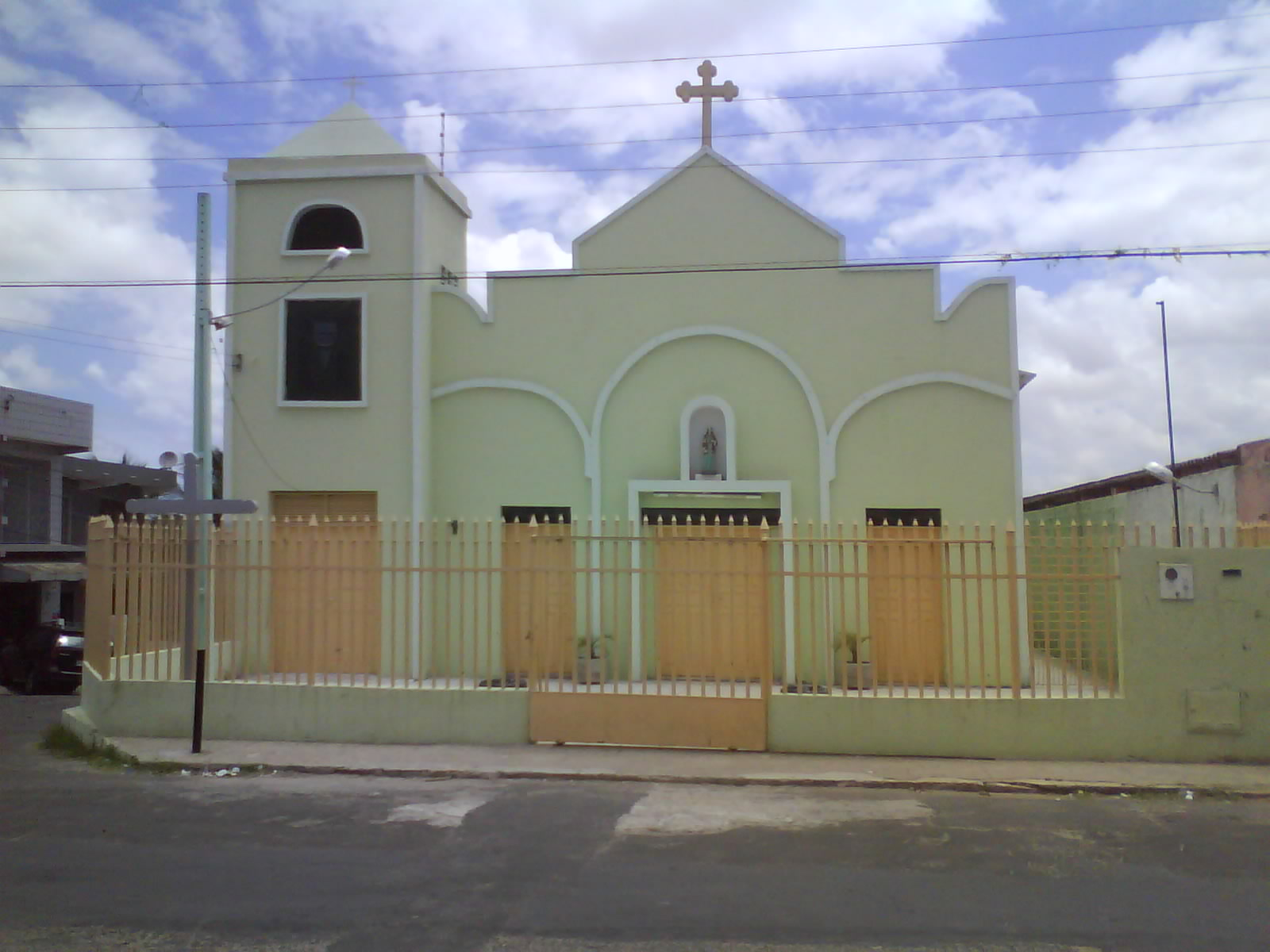
Chapel of Santa Luzia, on the Coronel Francisco Bento Street

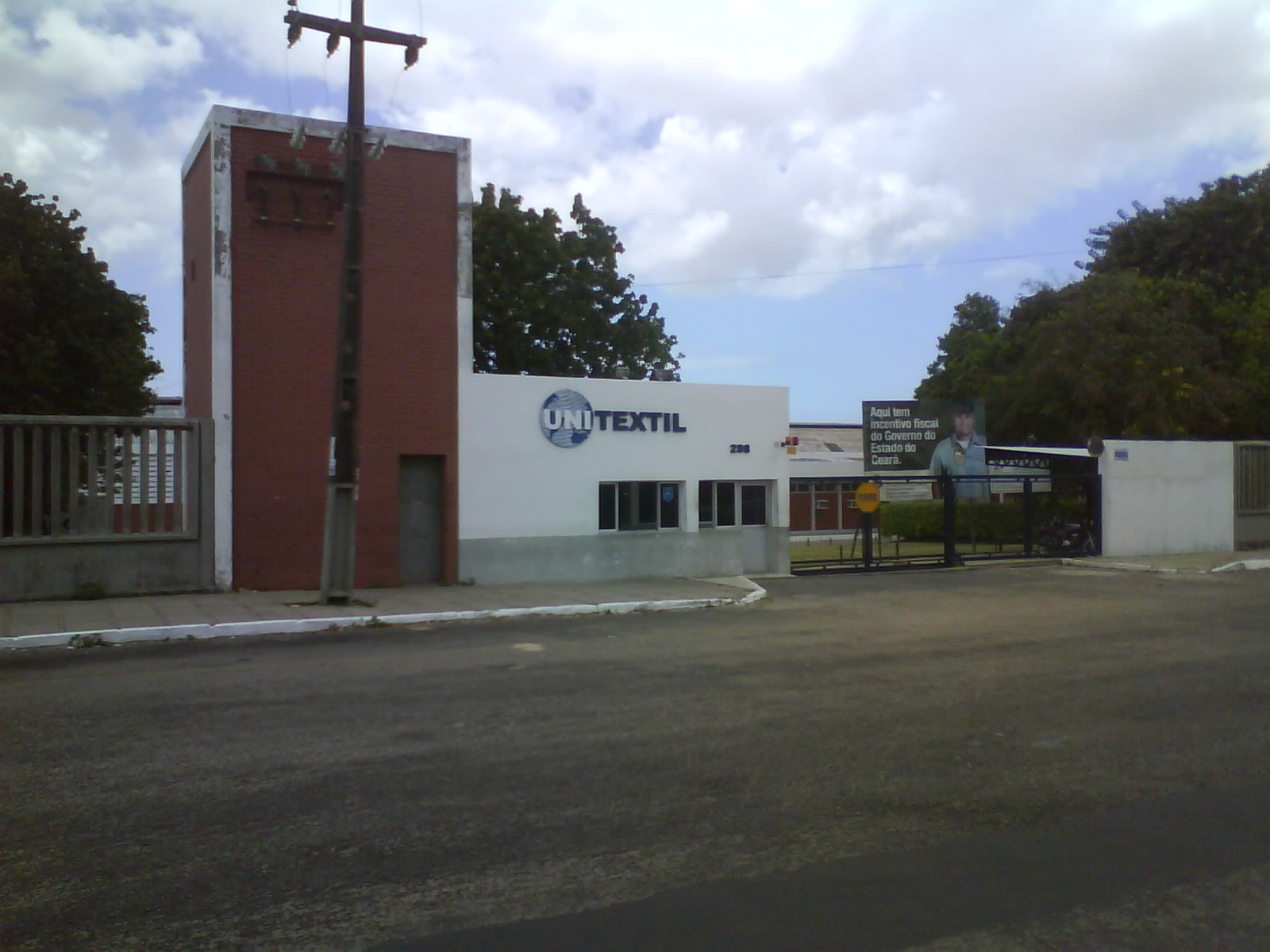
Textile industry Unitêxtil
