= Terra Brasil =

- Genre: Travel documentary
- Starring: Anderson Santos; Aruay Goldschmidt; Mayra Abbondanza
- Country of origin: Brazil
- Original language: Portuguese

Production
- Executive producers: Carla Albuquerque; Beto Ribeiro
- Cinematography: Marcelo Jose Assayag Rocha; Sérgio Rousselet
- Production company: Medialand

Original release
- Network: Animal Planet (Brazil)
- Release: April 3, 2017 – present

Terra Brasil is a Brazilian travel documentary television series that premiered on Animal Planet in Brazil on April 3, 2017. The series follows the agronomist Aruay Goldschmidt, botanist Anderson Santos and chef Mayra Abbondanza in their visits to preserved areas in several regions of Brazil, revealing the country's natural wonders under the peculiar perspectives of each of the presenters.

== Episodes ==
=== Season 1 ===
#	Region	Title	Location
1	Southeast	Nascentes de Paranapiacaba	Paranapiacaba
2	Southeast	Manguezal	Restinga de Bertioga State Park
3	Southeast	Caverna	Sumidouro State Park
4	Southeast	Cânion das Bandeirinhas	Serra do Cipó National Park
5	Southeast	Prateleiras do Itatiaia	Itatiaia National Park
6	Southeast	Cerca Grande	State Park of Cerca Grande
7	Southeast	Velozias Gigantes	Serra do Cipó National Park
8	South	Morretes	Pico do Marumbi State Park
9	Southeast	Janela do Céu	Ibitipoca State Park
10	South	Ilha do Mel	Ilha do Mel State Park

== Release ==
Terra Brasil began airing on April 3, 2017, on Animal Planet in Brazil. The series has been licensed to streaming services including Netflix, Amazon Prime Video and Looke.
