= Bandeirantes Anthem =

Brazilian state anthem of São Paulo

Bandeirantes Anthem (Hino dos Bandeirantes) is the official anthem of São Paulo state, composed by Guilherme de Almeida in the 1960s.

== History ==
The anthem was established by Law No. 337 of July 10, 1974, which repealed Article 3 of Law No. 9,854 of October 2, 1967, designating the poem Hino dos Bandeirantes, written by Guilherme de Almeida, as the official anthem's lyrics. The anthem has no official music; the most widely known versions are those by Spártaco Rossi, Sérgio de Vasconcellos Corrêa, and Mozart Kail.

State Anthem of São Paulo

== Lyrics ==
Portuguese original Paulista, para só um instante, Dos teus quatro séculos, Ante tua terra sem fronteiras, O teu São Paulo das bandeiras! Deixa para trás o presente, Olha o passado a frente, Vem com Martim Afonso a São Vicente, Galga a Serra do Mar! Além, lá no alto, Bartira sonha sossegadamente. Na sua rede virgem do Planalto. Espreita, entre a folhagem de esmeralda, Beija-lhe a Cruz de estrelas de Grinalda! Agora escuta! Aí vem, moendo o cascalho, Botas de nove léguas, João Ramalho; Serra acima, dos baixos da restinga, Vem subindo a roupeta, De Nóbrega e de Anchieta! Contempla os campos, De Piratininga! Este o colégio, Adiante está o sertão. Vai, segue a entrada! Enfrenta, Avança, Investe! Norte, Sul, Leste, Oeste! Em bandeira ou monção, Doma os índios bravios, Rompe a selva, abre minas, vara rios! No leito da jazida, Acorda a pedraria adormecida, Retorce os braços rijos, E tira o ouro, de seus esconderijos! Bateia, escorre a ganga, Lavra, planta, povoa! Depois volta à garoa! E adivinha, atrás dessa cortina, Na tardinha, enfeitada de miçanga, A sagrada colina, Ao grito do Ipiranga! Entreabre agora os véus, Do cafezal, Senhor dos Horizontes! Verás fluir por plainos, vales, montes, usinas, gares, silos, cais, arranha-céus!	English translation Paulista, stop for just a moment From your four centuries, Before your land without borders Your São Paulo of the bandeiras! Let the present behind Look to the past ahead Come with Martim Afonso to São Vicente, Go beyond the Serra do Mar! Beyond, up high, Bartira dreams peacefully In the virgin net of the plateau. Peep her by the emerald-like leaves, Kiss the Cross of Stars in her garland Now listen! Here he comes, smashing the gravels, With nine leagues boots, João Ramalho; Up in the mountains, above the sandbanks Nóbrega's and Anchieta's cassocks Are coming up Behold the fields, Of Piratininga! This is the school, The interior is ahead. Go! Follow the entrada! Confront! Advance! Attack! North, South, East, West! In bandeira or monção Tame the wild Indians Breach the jungle, open mines, cross the rivers! In the edge of the placer, Wake up the sleeping minerals, Retwist the wiery arms, And take the gold out of its hiding-place! Pan, separate the gangue, Cultivate, plant, populate! Then, return to the drizzle! And guess, through this curtain, In the evening, adorned with glass beads, The Sacred Hill, Of the cry of Ipiranga! Timidly open the veils, Of the coffee plantation, Lord of the Horizons! You will see it flow through plains, valleys, mountains, factories, stations, silos, quays, and skyscrapers!
