= Peter Wilhelm Lund =

Danish scientist (1801–1880)

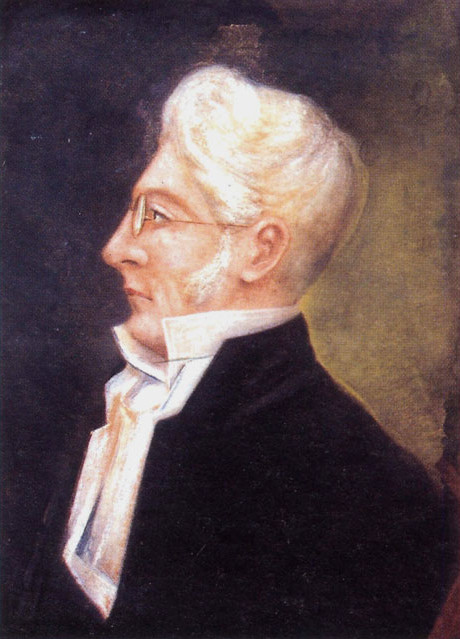
- Born: 14 June 1801; Copenhagen, Denmark-Norway
- Died: 25 May 1880 (aged 78); Lagoa Santa, Minas Gerais, Brazil
- Education: University of Copenhagen
- Known for: Pioneering Brazilian paleontology, archeology and speleology
- Scientific career
- Fields: Paleontology and Archeology

Peter Wilhelm Lund (14 June 1801 – 25 May 1880) was a Danish paleontologist, zoologist, and archeologist. He spent most of his life working and living in Brazil. He is considered the father of Brazilian paleontology as well as archaeology.

Lund was the first to describe dozens of species of Pleistocene megafauna, including the saber-toothed cat Smilodon populator. He also made the then ground-breaking discovery that humans co-existed with long-extinct animal species, something which possibly prompted him to terminate his scientific work. His comprehensive collections are today found at the Danish Natural History Museum in Copenhagen.

== Early life and education ==
Peter Wilhelm Lund was born into a wealthy family in Copenhagen. He showed an early interest in natural sciences and was working towards a career in medicine, but following the death of his father, his passion for natural history prompted him instead to opt for that study at the University of Copenhagen. As a student, he wrote two prize-winning dissertations. One of them, published in German, won him international recognition.

== First trip to Brazil and return to Europe ==
Due to growing tuberculosis, he traveled to Brazil in 1825 and spent the following three and a half years collecting specimens of plants, birds, and insects in the area around Rio de Janeiro, and writing about ants, snails and birds of the region.

Back in Europe in 1829, he achieved a doctoral degree at the University of Kiel, traveled to Italy and later established himself in Paris, where he came under the influence of Georges Cuvier, professor of comparative anatomy at the Muséum National d'Histoire Naturelle and the most influential naturalist and zoologist of the time.

In his Discours sur les révolutions de la surface du globe (1825), Cuvier theorized that the extinction of species was caused by natural catastrophes in certain regions of the world. When that happens, the fauna from other regions migrate to populate the now uninhabited area. This became known as catastrophism or the catastrophic theory, and would become the motto of Lund's scientific career.

== Return to Brazil and turn to paleontology ==
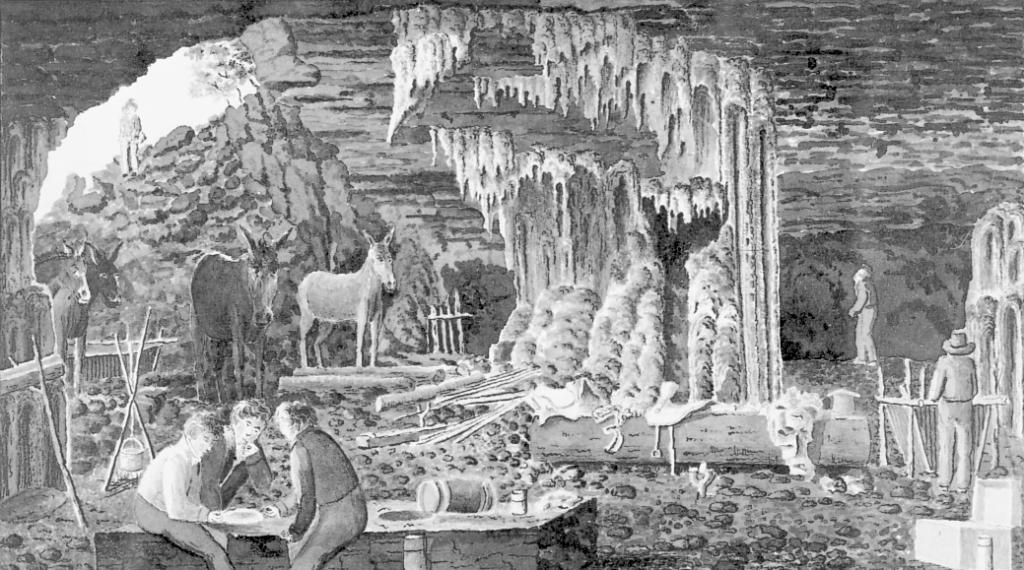
P. W. Lund at work in the Lappa do Mosquito near Lagoa Santa, by P. A. Brandt

In 1832 Lund returned to Brazil, never to return to Europe. He spent the first two years collecting mainly botanical specimens in the provinces of Rio de Janeiro and São Paulo. Charles Darwin also passed through Rio in 1832, but it is unknown whether the two naturalists met.

In 1835, Lund was traveling inland through the province of Minas Gerais, and in Lagoa, an area characterised by a peculiar Karst geology, discovered several caves full of fossilized bones from extinct Ice Age megafauna species. He eventually settled in the small town of Lagoa Santa, and dedicated the next eight years to excavating, collecting, classifying and studying more than 20,000 bones of extinct species, including mastodons and ground sloths. With him was the Norwegian painter Peter Andreas Brandt who assisted him throughout his work as an illustrator. He was also assisted by the Danish botanist Eugen Warming from 1839 to 1859.

Lund was the first to describe dozens of species, among them the saber-toothed cat Smilodon populator. His exploration took place mainly in the region of Lagoa Santa, which is rich in caves and karst formations and nowadays comprises the northern part of Greater Belo Horizonte. He was also one of the first to recognize, appreciate, and record prehistoric rock and cave paintings in South America.

Then in 1843, Lund made a remarkable discovery. During a severe drought, he discovered, deep in a flooded cave, the fossilized skulls and bones of 30 humans. These individuals were found among the remains of long-extinct species, leading him to realize that humans and prehistoric animals had co-existed, something which was in frontal opposition to Cuvier's catastrophic theory.

== Early retirement and late life ==
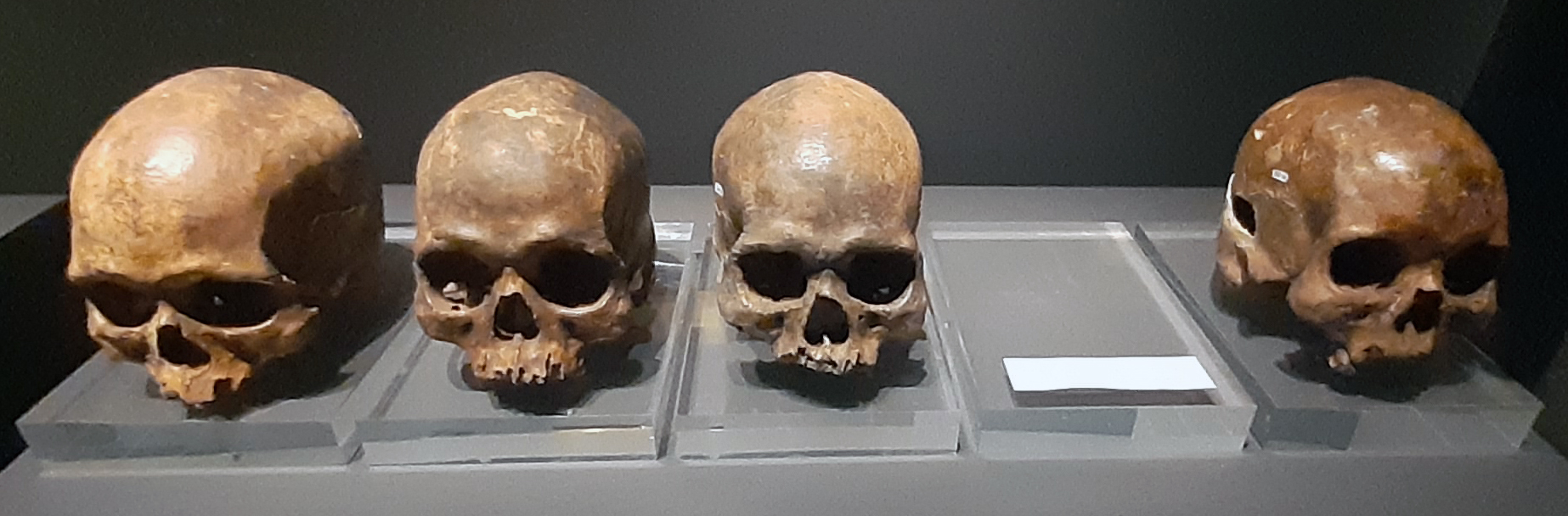
Lagoa Santa skulls collected by Lund

Only a year after his ground-breaking finds of human remains, Lund suddenly stopped the work in the caves, citing lack of resources to finance the excavations. He then donated his huge collection to the king and the people of Denmark. Alleging fragile health conditions, he decided to stay in Lagoa Santa, never to return to Europe. Whereas Lund possibly took badly to his own findings, Darwin embraced them with enthusiasm.

The next 35 years were spent exchanging letters with the curators of his collections in Copenhagen, as well as receiving the visits of young European naturalists. The complete study of his collections, E Museo Lundii, was published only in 1888.

While living in Lagoa Santa, he hosted several European naturalists, such as the Danish botanist Eugenius Warming. Lund never married and died in Lagoa Santa three weeks before reaching the age of 79.

== Legacy ==
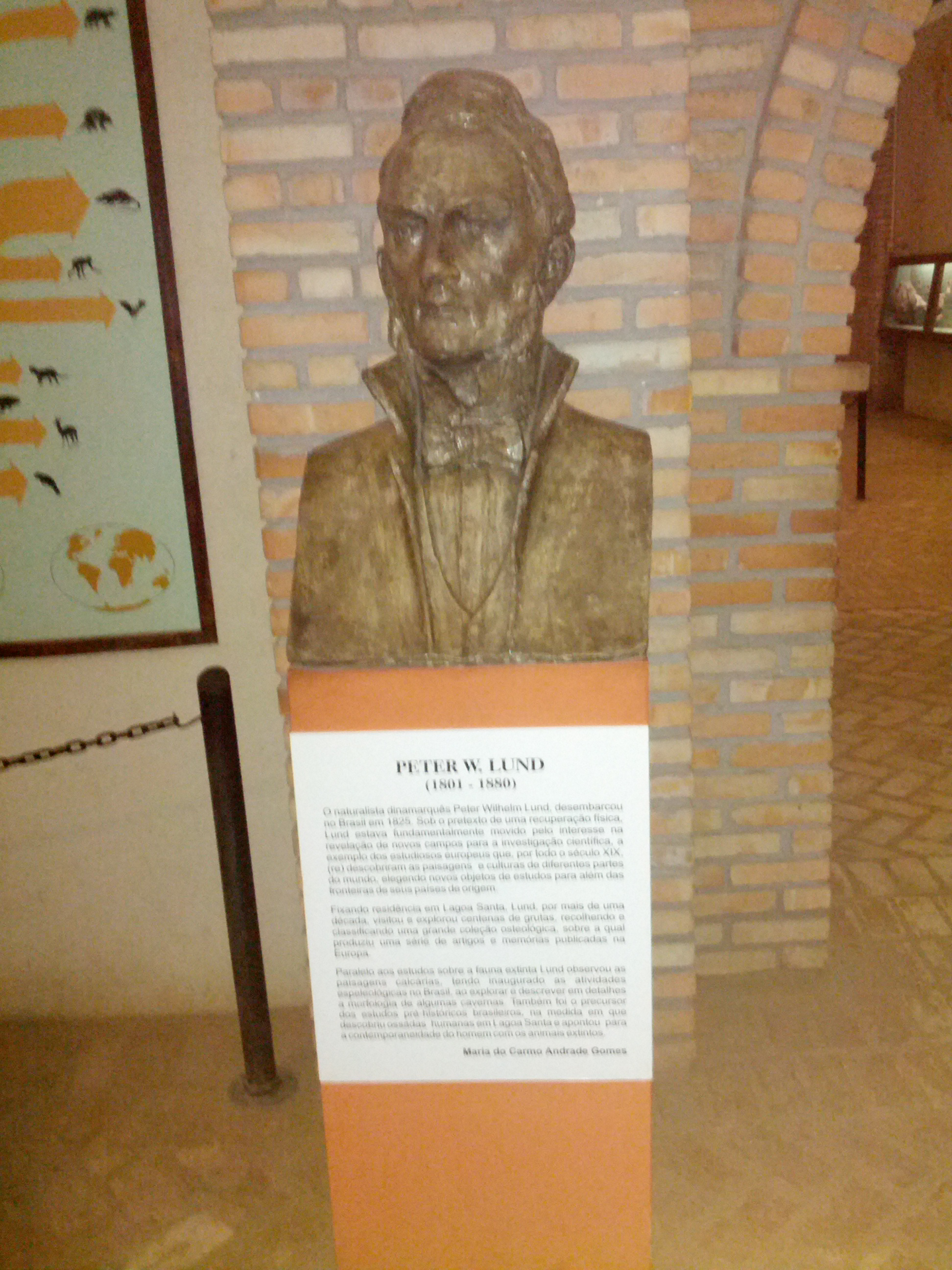
Statue of Lund at Natural History Museum and Botanical Garden of Universidade Federal de Minas Gerais.

The cave where Lund made his discovery of "Lagoa Santa Man" is now protected by the 2,004 hectares (4,950 acres) Sumidouro State Park, created in 1980. The journal Lundiana is named in his honour as is a town in Lagoa Santa. Lund is considered the "Father of Brazilian paleontology and archeology." His voluminous correspondence with Brazilian scientists and institutions is still uncollected.

A species of Brazilian lizard, Heterodactylus lundii, is named in his honor. Also a flowering genus of plants from Central America was named Lundia in his honour in 1838.

== Cultural references ==
- Danish writer Henrik Stangerup's novel The Road to Lagoa Santa is a fictional account of Lund's life, focussing on his early and sudden retirement which is thought to have been motivated by religious doubts caused by his scientific findings.

== Bibliography ==
- Birgitte Holten, Michael Sterll, Jon Fjeldså: Den forsvundne maler. P.W. Lund og P.A. Brandt i Brasilien. Museum Tusculanum Press. 2009. ISBN 978-87-7289-743-1 (240 pp)
- Jensen, A. (1932) Peter Wilhelm Lund, pp. 110–114 in: Meisen, V. Prominent Danish Scientists through the Ages. University Library of Copenhagen 450th Anniversary. Levin & Munksgaard, Copenhagen.
- Luna, Pedro Ernesto de: Peter Wilhelm Lund: o auge das suas investigações científicas e a razão para o término das suas pesquisas, (in Portuguese) Ph.D. thesis, Universidade de São Paulo, 2007.
- Faria, F.Felipe de A. (2008). "Peter Lund and the questioning of Catastrophism (Peter Lund (1801–1880) e o questionamento do Catastrofismo) (in) Filosofia e História da Biologia Volume 3, 2008 – Seleção de Trabalhos do VI Encontro de Filosofia e História da Biologia, pp:139-156 (disponível em https://www.abfhib.org/FHB/FHB-03/FHB-v03-08-Frederico-Felipe-Faria.pdf)". Philosophy & History of Biology = Filosofia e História da Biologia. ABFHIB. ISSN 1983-053X.
