= Sumidouro State Park =

State park in Minas Gerais, Brazil

- Parque Estadual do Sumidouro
- IUCN category II (national park)
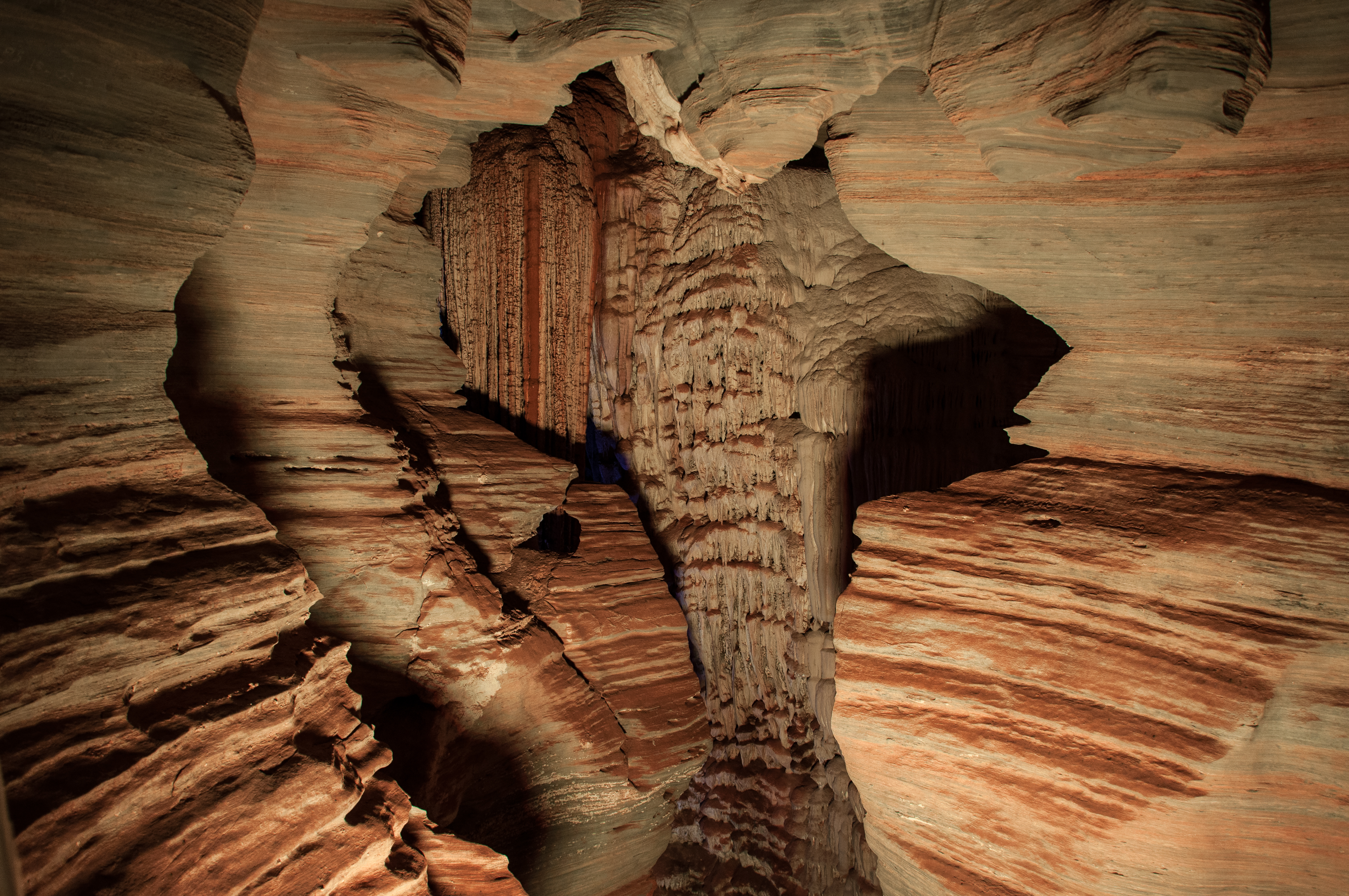
- Column in the Gruta da Lapinha

- Location within Brazil
- Nearest city: Lagoa Santa, Minas Gerais
- Coordinates: 19.548594°S 43.951241°W
- Area: 2,004 hectares (4,950 acres)
- Designation: State park
- Created: 3 January 1980
- Administrator: Instituto Estadual de Florestas MG
- Website: pesumidouro.blogspot.ca

The Sumidouro State Park (Portuguese: Parque Estadual do Sumidouro) is a state park in the state of Minas Gerais, Brazil. The remains of the first human inhabitants of Brazil were found in the park area in the early 19th century, along with bones of now-extinct megafauna. The main attraction is the Gruta da Lapinha, a large limestone cave.

== Location ==
The Sumidouro State Park is in the municipalities of Lagoa Santa (56%) and Pedro Leopoldo (44%), north of the metropolitan area of Belo Horizonte, Minas Gerais. It is 50 kilometres (31 mi) from Belo Horizonte. The park is in the federal Carste de Lagoa Santa Environmental Protection Area. It has an area of 2,004 hectares (4,950 acres). The unit was named after its lagoon, Sumidouro ("sink"). The lagoon is drained by a network of galleries through which the water penetrates underground into the limestone basin.

== History ==
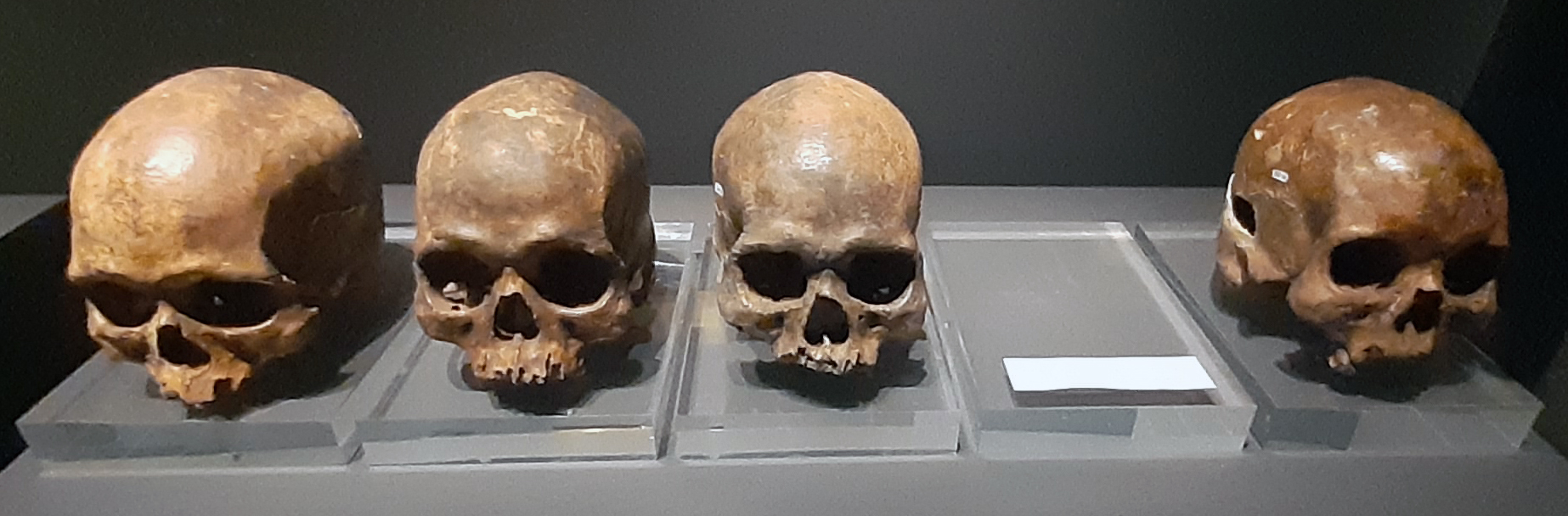
Lagoa Santa skulls collected by Peter Wilhelm Lund

The Danish naturalist Peter Wilhelm Lund conducted research in the area now covered by the park in the first half of the 19th century. He found remains of Lagoa Santa Man, the first inhabitants of Brazil, along with extinct megafauna. The coexistence of man with extinct species was quoted by Charles Darwin in On the Origin of Species. The skeleton of "Luzia" found in Lagoa Santa in the 1970s was dated to 11,500 years ago, changing views of when the continent had been occupied. There are traces of stone age people who lived outside the caves in what may be the oldest open-air site of paleoindians.

The Sumidouro State Park was created by state governor Francelino Pereira by decree 20.375 of 3 January 1980. It was originally called the Ecological Park of the Sumidouro Valley (Portuguese: Parque Ecológico do Vale do Sumidouro). Little was done to implement the park until 2006, when environmental compensation funding became available from the green line between Belo Horizonte and the Tancredo Neves International Airport in Confins.

In October 2007 it was reported that the Sumidouro State Park was in the final stages of implementation, and since August 2007 had a temporary headquarters at the Casa Fernão Dias. The State Forest Institute (IEF) was to acquire 350 hectares (860 acres) by the end of the year and start construction of a visitor center, house for the manager and administrative structure, and the goal was to complete implementation by the end of 2008. The IEF was also registering owners living in the park and checking their documentation so that compensation for expropriation could be calculated. The consultative council held its first meeting in October 2007 after an inauguration ceremony in the Gruta da Lapinha attended by councilors and representatives of the local community.

Decree 44.935 of 3 November 2008 expanded the area of the park. Law 19.998 of 29 December 2011 defined the boundaries. It is a fully protected conservation unit with the objectives of promoting preservation of the environment and cultural heritage, while supporting research, conservation, environmental education and tourism. A study published in 2013 indicated that the local people were dissatisfied with the way the park was being managed. Residents said they had not been consulted in the park creation process, did not see the need for so many rules, and if they had more information could help maintain the natural heritage while enjoying it as in the past.

== Environment ==
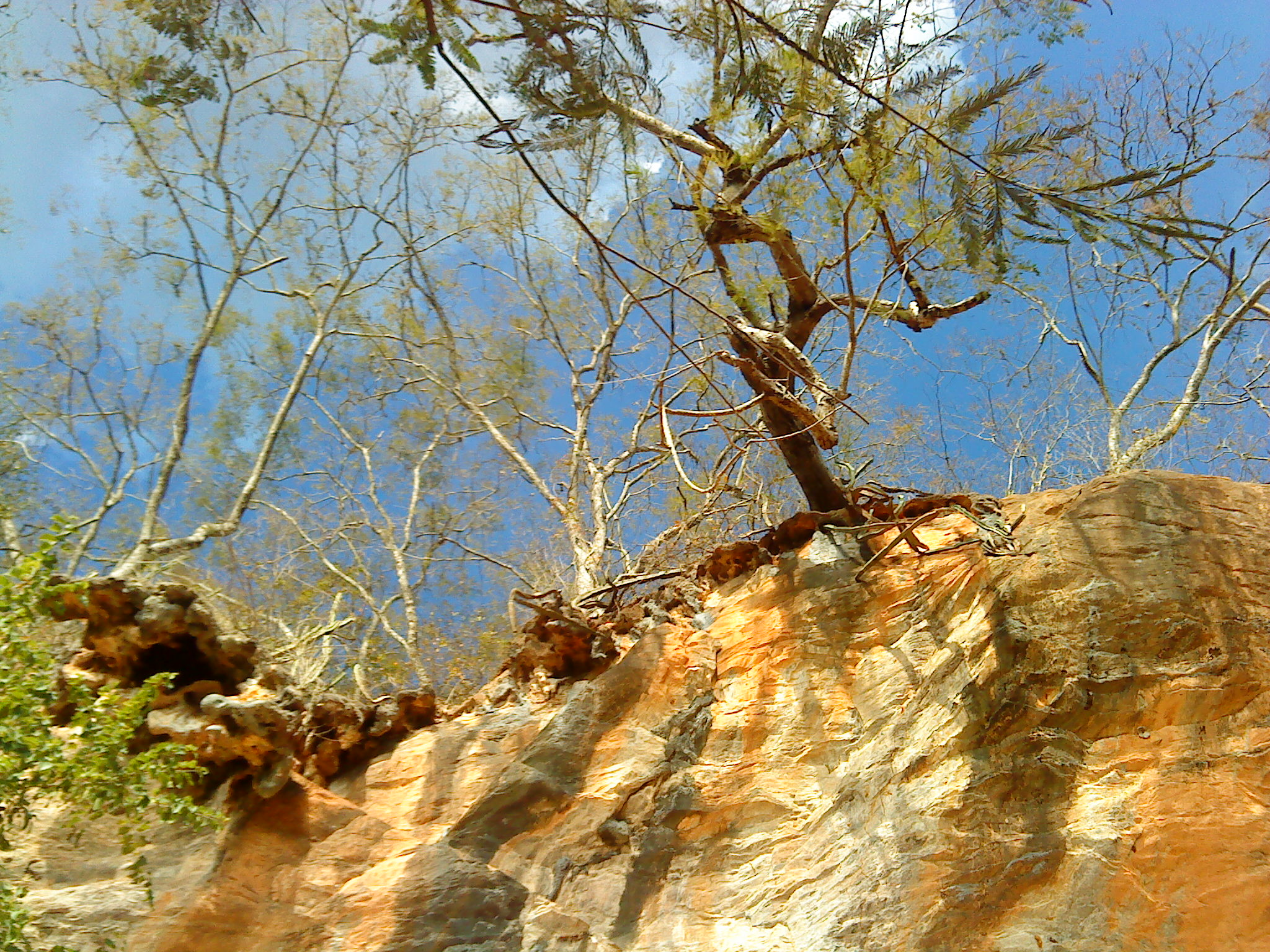
Tree growing on a cliff in the park

The park is in an area of carbonate rock formations, with springs, sinkholes, and caves rich in speleothems. The climate is tropical humid, with rainy summers when there are periods of flooding and dry winters. The flora includes species from the cerrado and Atlantic Forest biomes.

Vegetation includes gallery forest, cerrado and rocky meadows. Flora include ipê-amarelo, ipê-roxo, moreira, aroeirinha, jatobá-do-campo, gabiroba, manjoba, mutamba and faveiro. The park is in the transition zone from cerrado to Atlantic Forest, and also has dry forest. Trees with heights of 5 to 8 metres (16 to 26 ft) predominate in the cerrado, in the northeast and east regions of the Sumidouro lagoon. These include pequi, pau-terra, cagaita, tingui and sucupira.

Deciduous trees predominate in limestone areas, reaching about 20 metres (66 ft) in height. These include aroeira, gameleira, angico, cedro, catiguá, embiruçu, paineira and maria-pobre. There are also species typical of the caatinga such as cactos mandacaru and figo-da-barbária, and shrubs such as pimentinha-do-mato. Around the Gruta da Lapinha the predominant trees are semi-deciduous, losing about half their leaves in the dry season, and growing to 15 to 20 metres (49 to 66 ft). These include angico-vermelho, angico-branco, jequitibá-branco and paineira. The original forest has been damaged by man, causing impoverishment of the soil and invasion of cerrado species. The park's management plan includes restoration of some of the areas.

There 13 species of bats, and 13 species of other mammals, including marsupials and rodents. There is a large bat population due to the many caves in the park area. Fauna include jaguar (Panthera onca), cougar (Puma concolor), gray brocket (Mazama gouazoubira), tayra (Eira barbara), coatis, crab-eating fox (Cerdocyon thous), black-tufted marmoset (Callithrix penicillata), gray four-eyed opossum (Philander opossum), opossums, Brazilian squirrel (Sciurus aestuans), South American water rat (Nectomys squamipes), capybara (Hydrochoerus hydrochaeris) pacas, common agoutis, Brazilian guinea pig (Cavia aperea) and tapeti (Sylvilagus brasiliensis). Amphibians include pererequinha-de-banheiro, rãzinha, rã-cachorro, rã-manteiga, rã-assobiadeira, sapo-cururu, sapo-cururuzinho and sapo-bororó.

132 species of birds have been recorded. These include pied-billed grebe (Podilymbus podiceps), neotropic cormorant (Phalacrocorax brasilianus), snowy egret (Egretta thula), black-bellied whistling duck (Dendrocygna autumnalis), southern lapwing (Vanellus chilensis), whistling heron (Syrigma sibilatrix), black-necked stilt (Himantopus mexicanus) and osprey (Pandion haliaetus).

== Facilities ==
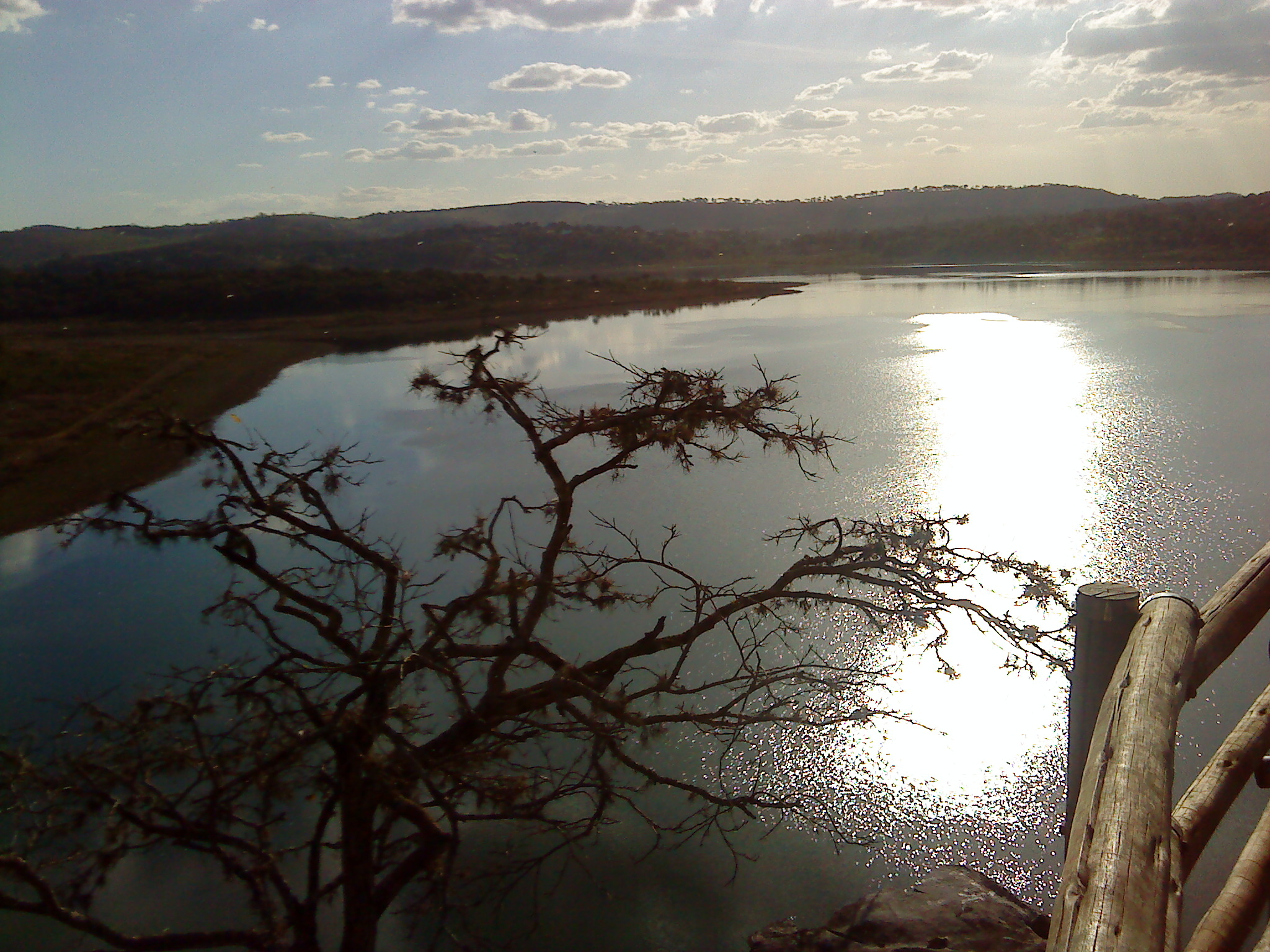
Sumidouro Lake

The park has two visitor bases, one with the Peter Lund Museum and the Gruta de Lapinha, and the other with the Casa Fernão Dias. There is accommodation for researchers and a research center. There are entrance fees for the museum, trails and the cave, which can only be visited when accompanied by a registered guide. The park is busiest in July and August.

The visitor center has restrooms, a snack bar and a small souvenir shop. Lagoa Santa also has eating places, shops and hotels. All visits must be scheduled and accompanied by a guide. There are rock faces from 550 to 750 metres (1,800 to 2,460 ft) height near the Peter Lund Museum that may be scaled by experienced climbers who bring their own equipment.

=== Exhibitions ===
The Peter Lund Museum was inaugurated on 21 September 2012. It has an exhibition area with 80 fossils from the Natural History Museum of Denmark. There is an area with exhibits that explain the historical and cultural importance of the Lagoa Santa karst. There is also a multi-purpose room and two rooms with exhibits on the park and the speleological management plans.

The Casa Fernão Dias is outside the park proper, in the Quinta do Sumidouro district of Pedro Leopoldo. It is listed by the State Institute of Historic and Artistic Heritage (IEPHA) as a cultural heritage monument. The exhibits tell the history of Fernão Dias, a bandeirante who spent several years in the region with his followers in search of gold and precious stones. The house contains an annex where administrative staff work.

=== Gruta da Lapinha ===
The Gruta da Lapinha is a cave within a limestone massif formed around 600 million years ago in the bed of the sea that once covered the whole region. The great hall created where the limestone has dissolved is 511 metres (1,677 ft) long and 40 metres (130 ft) deep. It contains beautiful speleothems, which are illuminated by light-emitting diodes (LEDs) to avoid generating too much heat.

=== Trails ===
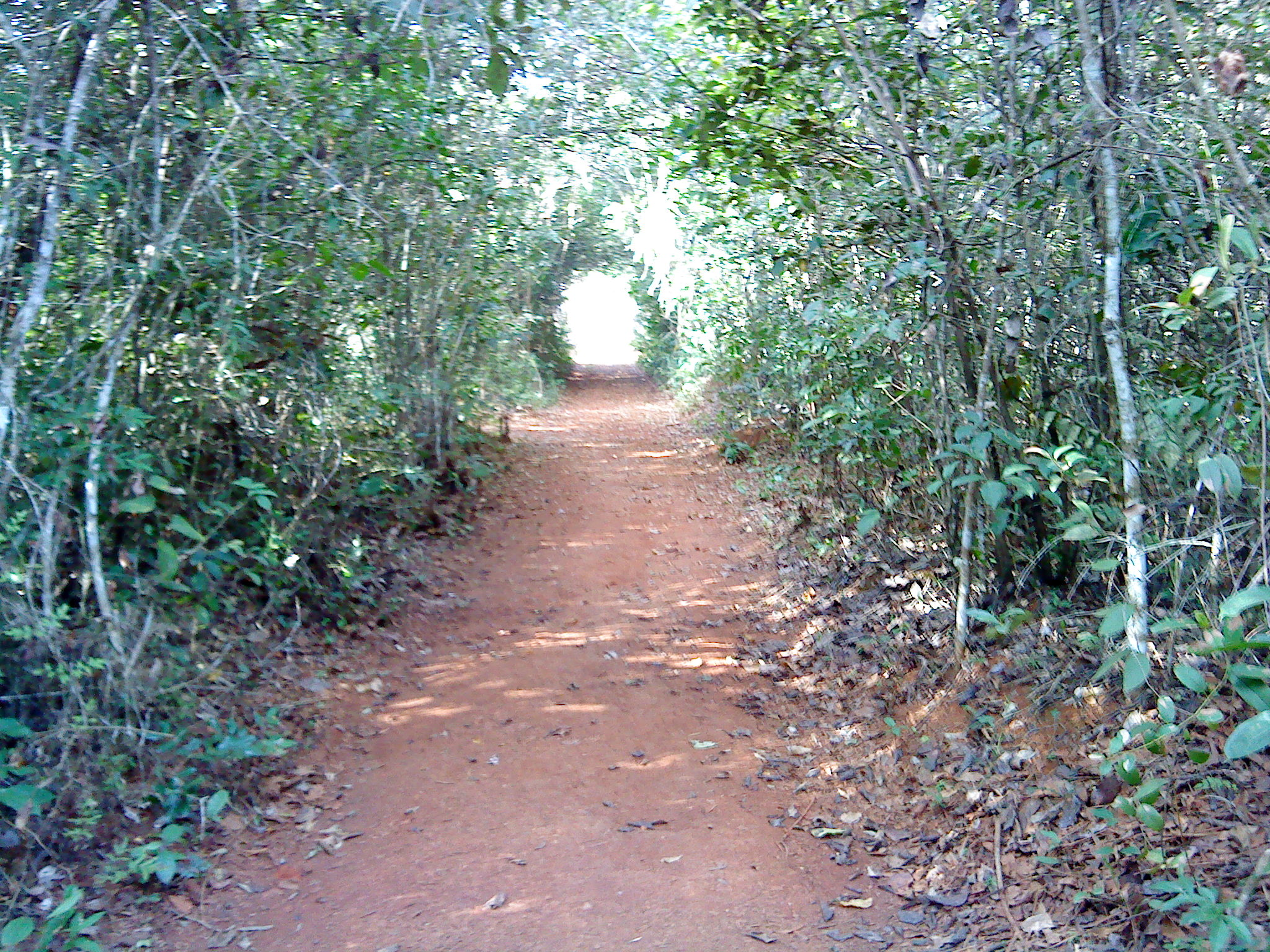
Trail through vegetation typical of the park

The trails can only be visited on weekends. During the rainy season in November and December the trails may be closed depending on weather conditions.

The Lapinha circuit is a 40–60 minute interpretive trail that begins at the entrance of the Gruta da Lapinha and leads along the side of the limestone massif. The trail lets visitors see features of the karst relief and typical cerrado flora. It passes through the Macumba cave, which shows aspects of geological and climatic changes in the region. The trail is easy to medium difficulty, with some stairs and slight inclines. It must be scheduled in advance.

The 90-minute Sumidouro trail starts at the Casa Fernão Dias and passes through the historical landmark "Cruz do Pai Mané". It leads to the Sumidouro lagoon gazebo, which gives a view of the surrounding region, and then to the Gruta do Sumidouro (Sumidouro Cave), which has cave paintings thousands of years old. The Gruta do Sumidouro is where Peter Lund found human bones mingled with bones of extinct megafauna, and removed about 30 skulls of "Lagoa Santa Man". The trail returns to the Casa Fernão Dias along the edge of the Sumidouro lake. The trail is medium difficult and must be scheduled in advance.

The 3 hours and 30 minutes Travessia trail starts from the Gruta da Lapinha and crosses the park to the Sumidouro lake. Some stretches are through forest and others across open meadows, and some climbing is involved. Along the trail there are panoramic views of the region and points of interest such as the Cruzeiro Histórico, the Vinhático, the Sumidouro lookout point and the Sumidouro cave with its rock paintings. The trail is medium difficult and must be scheduled in advance.

== Sources ==
- Conselho do Parque Estadual do Sumidouro toma posse (in Portuguese), IEF, October 2007
- Governo investe na preservação das áreas verdes na RMBH (in Portuguese), IEF, 29 October 2007
- Padoan, Lucas de Lima Fernandes; Souza, Leonardo Vasconcelos de (2013), "Contexto Socioambiental do Parque Estadual do Sumidouro, Apa Carste de Lagoa Santa, MG" (PDF), Anais – Uso Público em Unidades de Conservação (in Portuguese), 1 (1), Niterói – RJ
- "Parque Estadual do Sumidouro", Descubra Minas (in Portuguese), SENAC Minas
- Parque Estadual do Sumidouro (in Portuguese), IEF: Instituto Estadual de Florestas MG
- "Parque Estadual do Sumidouro", Viagem (in Portuguese), Editora Abril
- Santos, Francelino Pereira dos (3 January 1980), Decreto nº 20.375, de 03 de janeiro de 1980 (PDF) (in Portuguese), Minas Gerais
