= Fernão Dias =

Paulista bandeirante

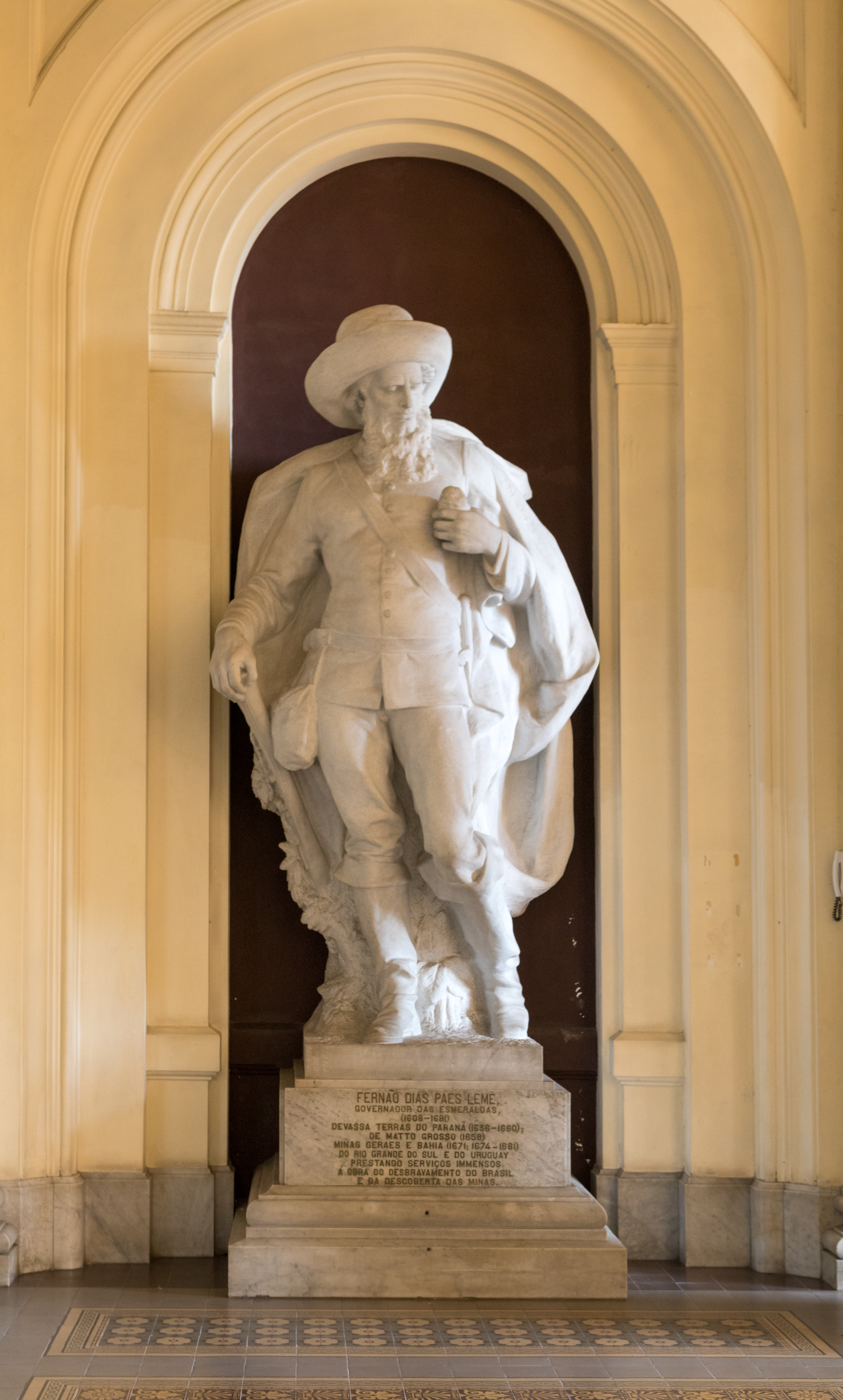
- Statue of Fernão Dias Pais, Ipiranga Museum
- Born: 1608; São Paulo
- Died: 1681 (aged 72–73)
- Occupation: Explorer
- Known for: Exploration of the interior of South America.

Signature
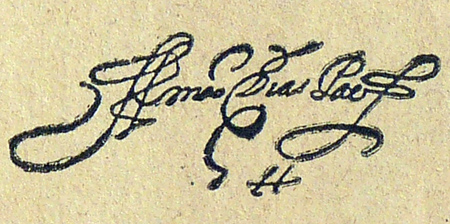

Fernão Dias Pais Leme (1608–1681) was a Paulista bandeirante. He was known as the Emerald Hunter (Portuguese: o Caçador de Esmeraldas) and was one of the most prominent bandeirantes together with António Raposo Tavares.

He was born in Sao Paulo in 1608. He was from an aristocratic white family. His grandfathers were born in Portugal and the Azores, while his grandmothers were paulistas.

He was a slave owner.

He is the great-great-grandfather of the Saint Frei Galvão.

The Casa Fernão Dias, run by the Sumidouro State Park, is in the Quinta do Sumidouro district of Pedro Leopoldo, Minas Gerais. It is listed by the State Institute of Historic and Artistic Heritage (IEPHA) as a cultural heritage monument. The exhibits tell the history of Fernão Dias, who spent several years in the region with his followers in search of gold and precious stones.

== Sources ==
- Parque Estadual do Sumidouro (in Portuguese), IEF: Instituto Estadual de Florestas MG, archived from the original on 2016-12-20
