= Lagoa Santa, Minas Gerais =

Municipality and region in the state of Minas Gerais, Brazil

Coordinates: 19°37′37″S 43°53′24″W

- Municipality
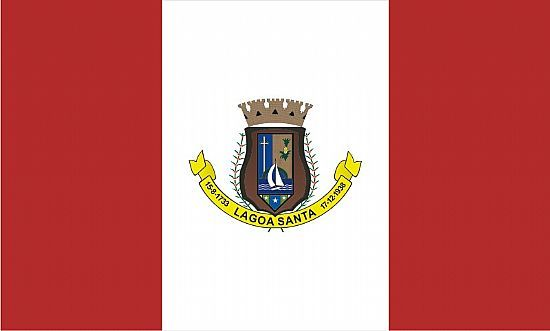
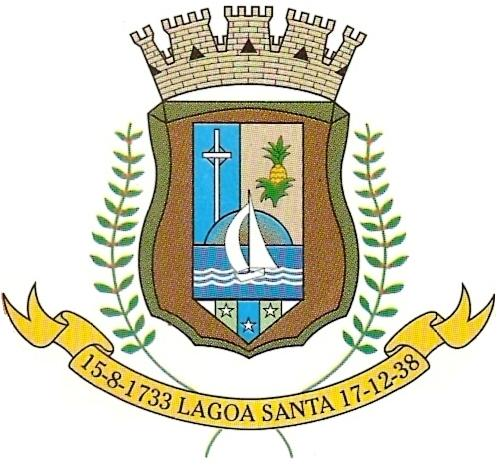
- Flag Coat of arms
- Interactive map of Lagoa Santa, Minas Gerais
- Country: Brazil
- State: Minas Gerais
- Region: Southeast

Population (2022 Census)
  - Total: 75,145
  - Estimate (2025): 81,299
- Time zone: UTC−3 (BRT)

Location of Lagoa Santa within Minas Gerais

Lagoa Santa (Holy Lagoon) is a Brazilian municipality and region in the state of Minas Gerais. It is located 37 km north-northeast from Belo Horizonte and belongs to the mesoregion Metropolitana de Belo Horizonte and to the microregion of Belo Horizonte. In 2025 the estimated population was 81,299.

== Cradle of Brazilian paleontology ==
The Danish palaeontologist Peter Wilhelm Lund, known as the father of Brazilian paleontology, discovered a cave filled with human bones (15 skeletons) and megafauna (very large mammals) dating to the Pleistocene era. Eugen Warming assisted Lund 1863–1866, and described the flora of the area and the adaptations of the plants to the hazards of cerrado – drought and fire – in a work that still stands as a paradigm of ecological study ('Lagoa Santa'). The tomb of illustrator Peter Andreas Brandt, also an assistant of Lund, is located in the town. The municipality contains 56% of the 2,004 hectares (4,950 acres) Sumidouro State Park, created in 1980, which protects the cave where Lund made his discovery of the "Lagoa Santa Man".

A century later, in the 1970s, French archeologist Annette Laming-Emperaire carried out excavations in the area and discovered the oldest human fossil in Brazil, over 11 thousand years old, given the nickname Luzia.

== See also ==
- List of municipalities in Minas Gerais
- Pedra Furada sites
