= Peter Andreas Brandt =

Norwegian artist (1792–1862)

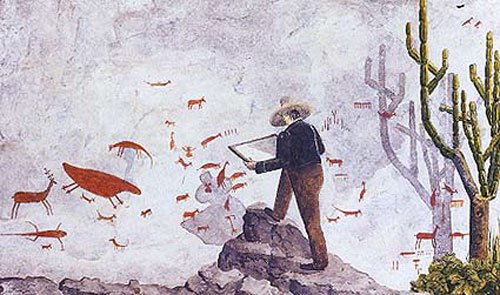
Brandt pictured himself while illustrating the rock paintings in the Cerca Grande cave.

Peter Andreas Brandt (14 June 1792 – 20 September 1862) was a Norwegian painter and illustrator. He worked as an illustrator with the Danish paleontologist Peter Wilhelm Lund in Brazil, producing works such as a map of the Lapa Vermelha cavern. Brant lived in the Brazilian town of Lagoa Santa, where he is buried.
