= Genealogia Paulistana =

Genealogia Paulistana is a São Paulo historical-genealogical work written by Luís Gonzaga da Silva Leme, published in nine volumes between 1903 and 1905. It is perhaps the largest Brazilian genealogical compilation, with more than two thousand pages.

Silva Leme treats the most relevant families in the population settling of São Paulo and of the interior of Brazil, involved in the most diverse sectors of national life, such as the economical (mostly agriculture) and the administrative (all families have members present in important public offices, be they bureaucratic or elective).

Each volume is divided in "Titles" ("Títulos"), representing different families and their descendency. The Errata and Adenda, published in volume nine, must also be consulted in order to correct and complete the information in the Titles.

The Genealogia Paulistana gives the settler families of São Paulo and Piratininga with distinction to, among others, the Leme, Prado, Furquim, Almeida Castanho, Freitas, Cunha Gago, Dias, Arruda Botelho, Afonso Gaya, Rendon, Moraes Antas, Fernandes Povoadores, Pires, Camargos, Bueno da Ribeira, Godói, Cubas, Quadros, Lara, Nogueira Cobra, Nogueira da Gama, Penteado, Raposo Goes, Pedroso Barros, Bicudo, Taques Pompeo, Toledo Piza, Siqueira, Borges de Cerqueira, Paes, Costa Cabral and the Alvarenga Monteiro. From these families descended the bandeirantes.

All of the Genealogia Paulistana revolves around the entanglement of these families with the couple João Ramalho and Bartira, as explained by Silva Leme in the book's introduction.

In 1999, the Projeto Genealogia Paulistana was started, from the effort and typing of volunteers, the work of Silva Leme was transcribed and finally made available on the internet, in 2003.

In 2002, the paulista genealogist Marta Maria Amato reedited the work, with corrections and unprecedented additions.
