= António Raposo Tavares =

Portuguese explorer in 17th-century Brazil

Raposo Tavares
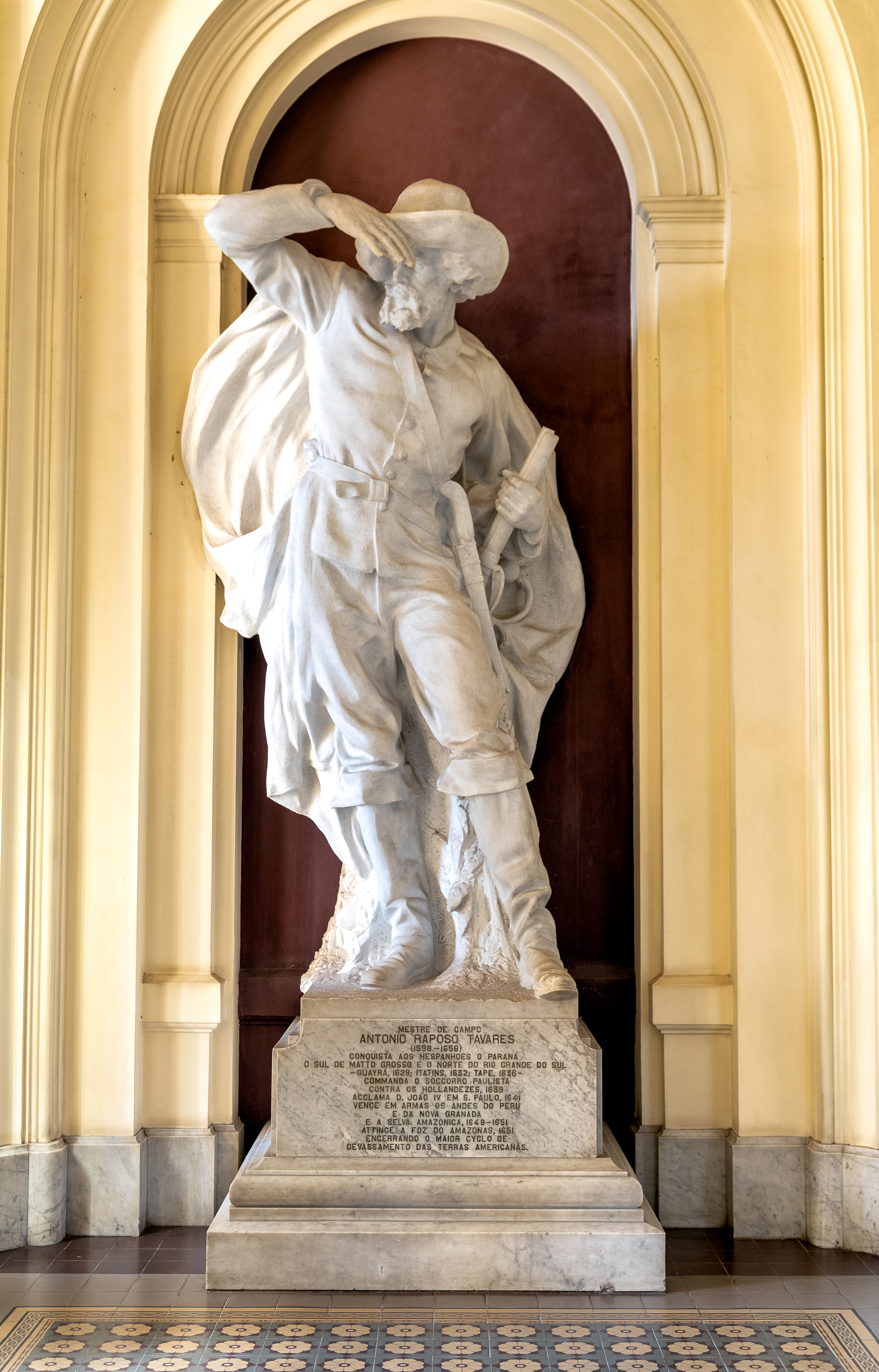
- Statue of Raposo Tavares at the Ipiranga Museum
- Born: 1598; São Miguel do Pinheiro, Kingdom of Portugal
- Died: 1658 (aged 59–60); São Paulo, Brazil
- Occupations: Explorer, slaver
- Known for: Expanding the Portuguese territory in the colony of Brazil.

António Raposo Tavares (1598–1658), known as the Elder (Portuguese: o Velho), was a Portuguese bandeirante who explored mainland eastern South America and claimed it for Portugal, extending the territory of the colony beyond the limits imposed by the Treaty of Tordesillas. He also led the largest expedition ever made in the Americas, covering over 10,000 kilometres (over 6,200 mi) around South America, unifying completely the two large South American river basins and the Andes in a single voyage. Raposo Tavares departed from São Paulo towards the rivers of the Río de la Plata Basin (mainly the Paraguay River) and the Andean slopes, and from there to Belém, at the mouth of the Amazon. Raposo Tavares was partly of Jewish origin according to the Jewish historian Anita Novinsky.

== Biography ==
Tavares was born in São Miguel do Pinheiro, Alentejo, Portugal in 1598. He sailed for South America in 1618 with his father Fernão Vieira Tavares. In 1622, after his father died, he settled around São Paulo; six years later, in 1628, he left the village with the first bandeira composed of 900 settlers and 2,000 Tupi warriors. This voyage was started to hunt the heretics down and to capture more indigenous slaves (mostly Tupis, Temiminós and Carijós). The bandeirantes first attacked some Guarani villages in the upper Parana valley, which were protected by the Spanish Jesuits and brutally killed many people, capturing 2,500 Indians. This journey allowed the annexation of a portion of the land east of the Uruguay River (current states of Paraná and Santa Catarina) to the Portuguese colony.

Tavares went back to São Paulo in 1633 and he became a judge. Three years later he left again on a new journey, this time to destroy the Spanish Jesuit settlements established southeast of the Uruguay River (current Rio Grande do Sul). From 1639 to 1642, Tavares fought along with the military which was engaged in war against the Dutch, who had conquered the settlements in the north-eastern coast (Bahia and Pernambuco).

He embarked on his last journey with a bandeira in 1648, searching for gold, precious minerals and slaves in the unexplored mainland. He was joined by 200 white mercenaries from São Paulo and over a thousand Indians. The bandeirantes travelled for over 10,000 kilometres (6,200 mi) following the courses of the rivers, most notably the Paraguay River, the Grande River, the Mamoré River, the Madeira River and the Amazon River. Only Tavares, 59 whites and some Indians reached Belém at the mouth of the Amazon River. After that, the survivors returned to São Paulo, where Raposo Tavares died in 1658.
