= Bandeirantes =

Members of colonial Brazilian expeditions (15th–18th centuries)

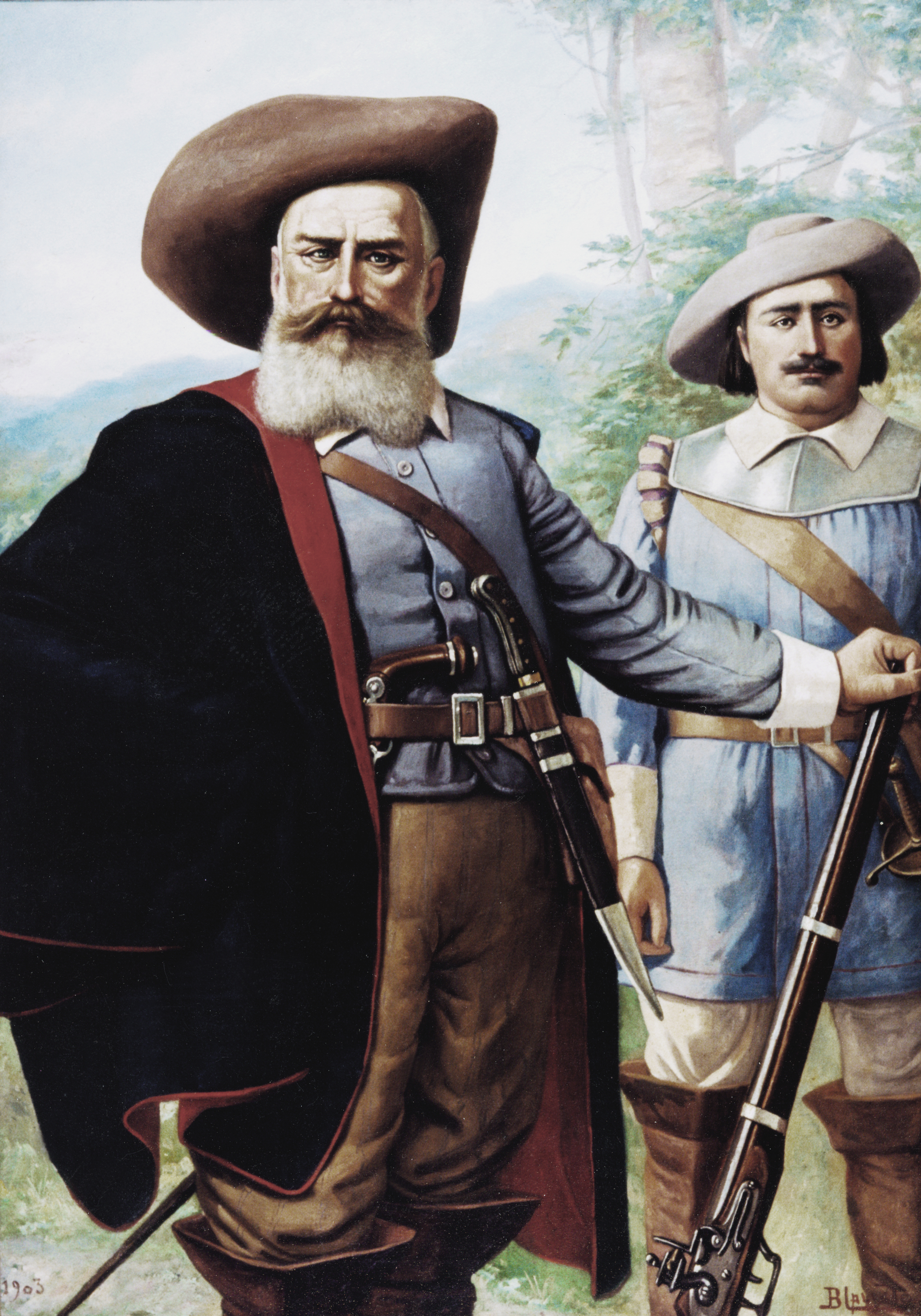
- Domingos Jorge Velho and Antônio F. de Abreu, by Benedito Calixto
- Date: 16th–18th century
- Location: Colonial Brazil
- Outcome: Bandeirantes being a mixture of indigenous people and Portuguese descendents explored unmapped regions of the Brazilian colony improving the economy and finding new riches. Expansion of Brazilian territory far beyond the Tordesillas line.

Bandeirantes (Portuguese: [bɐ̃dejˈɾɐ̃tʃis]; lit. 'flag-carriers'; singular: bandeirante) were frontiersmen and explorers in Colonial Brazil who, from the early 16th century, participated in inland expeditions to find precious metals and enslave indigenous peoples. They played a major role in expanding Brazil's borders to its approximate modern-day limits, beyond the boundaries demarcated by the 1494 Treaty of Tordesillas.

Most bandeirantes hailed from São Paulo, which was a small village in the Captaincy of São Vicente from 1534 to 1709 and later the Captaincy of São Paulo from 1720 to 1821. Some bandeirantes were descended from Portuguese colonists who settled in São Paulo, but most were of mameluco or mestiço descent, with both Portuguese and indigenous ancestry. This was because interracial marriage was the norm in colonial Brazilian society, as well as polygamy.

Initially, the bandeirantes aimed to explore and expand the Portuguese colonial territory beyond the boundaries established by the Treaty of Tordesillas. They ventured into unmapped regions in search of economic opportunities, particularly the discovery of gold, silver, and diamonds. Over time, as their expeditions progressed, the bandeirantes also began to capture and enslave indigenous peoples, which became a significant part of their activities. The bandeirantes spoke a mixture of Portuguese and the Paulista General Language, which influenced the toponyms and place names in the interior of the colony to this day.

== Name ==
The term comes from Portuguese bandeira or flag and by extension a group of soldiers, a detached military unit, or a raiding party. In medieval Portugal a bandeira was a military unit of 36 soldiers. The words were not used by the bandeirantes themselves. They used words like entry (entrada), journey, voyage, company, discovery and rarely, fleet or war. One writer dates bandeira from 1635 and bandeirante from 1740.

== Background ==
With the Treaty of Tordesillas in 1494 the South American continent was divided between the Portuguese Empire and the Spanish Empire along a meridian 370 leagues west of the Cape Verde islands. Many bandeirantes were mulattos and came from the Portuguese settlement in São Paulo who were sent out to chart and explore the interior of the country.

By exploring the interior of the country, Portugal was able to claim land that exceeded the line drawn by the Treaty of Tordesillas in 1494 and began to encompass what is today the country of Brazil. Bandeirantes usually numbered anywhere from 50 to several thousand and were sponsored by the wealthy elites. Many of these expeditions into the interior of Brazil set up trading posts and built roads that connected the settlements together.

=== Paulistas ===
Before there were bandeirantes there were Paulistas, many of whom were mestiço. Brazil was originally a coastal strip between mountains and sea dominated by slave-worked sugar plantations. When the Portuguese crossed the mountains to the São Paulo plateau they were cut off from the sea and faced a great wilderness to the north and west. The coastal Portuguese used African slaves while the Paulistas used indigenous slaves or workers.

== Identity ==
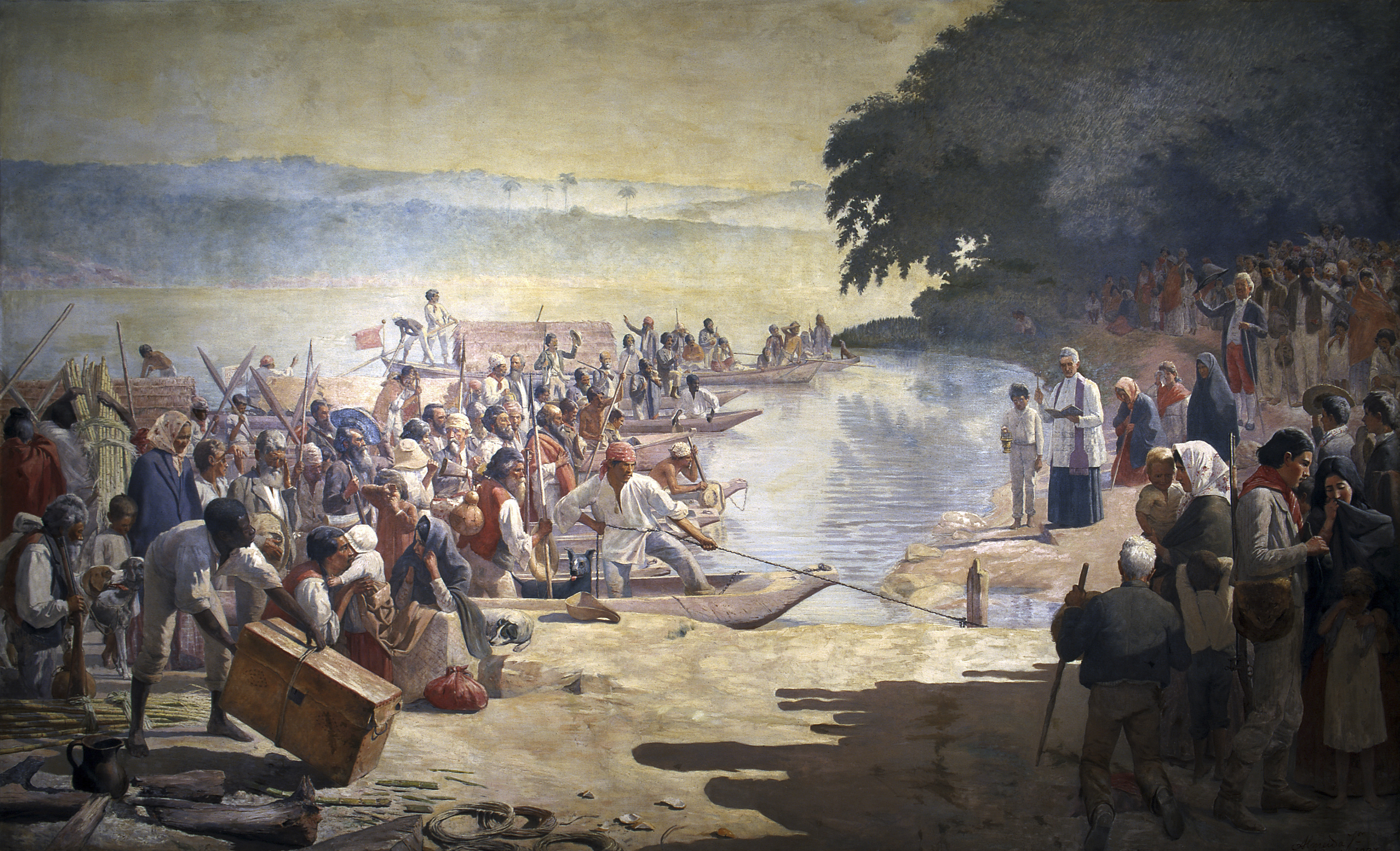
Departure of the bandeirantes from Porto Feliz for an expedition to the Brazilian interior

The bandeirantes were a product of diverse cultural backgrounds. Antrhopologist Darcy Ribeiro states that the bandeirantes were racially mixed, with interbreeding with indigenous people being common, even among the elite. The families of São Paulo were patrician and polygamous, but Catholic marriage only became consolidated later. The largest clan of Manuel Preto and António Raposo Tavares had 69 whites, 900 mamelucos and 2,000 indigenous people.

These individuals were often the descendants of indigenous women and Portuguese settlers. Contrary to some portrayals, many bandeirantes were of indigenous, mestiço, or lower-class Portuguese origin. In fact, as noted by historical sources, "Most of the bandeirantes were indigenous people and other poor people from the colony, many women were bandeirantes." These bandeirantes were often marginalized or disenfranchised people who found opportunity through these expeditions, which were both a means of survival and a path to personal achievement.

== Slavery ==
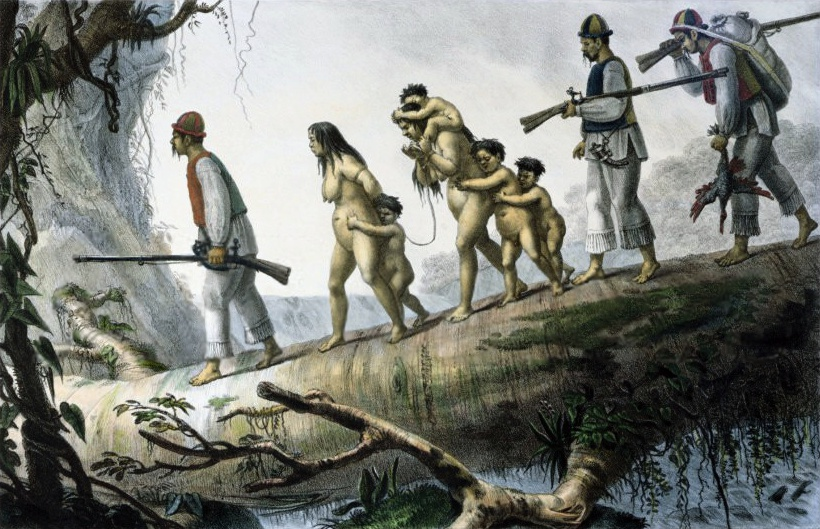
Painting by Jean-Baptiste Debret depicting bandeiras enslaving Guaraní people in the Brazilian interior

One of the bandeirantes' objectives was to capture and enslave native populations. They carried this out by a number of tactics. The bandeirantes usually relied on surprise attacks, simply raiding villages or collections of natives, killing any who resisted, and kidnapping the survivors. Trickery could also be used; one common tactic was disguising themselves as Jesuits, often singing Mass to lure the natives out of their settlements. At the time, the Jesuits had a deserved reputation as the only colonial force that treated the natives somewhat fairly in the Jesuit reductions of the region.

If luring the natives with promises did not work, the bandeirantes would surround the settlements and set them afire, forcing inhabitants out into the open. At a time when imported African slaves were comparatively expensive, the bandeirantes were able to sell large numbers of native slaves at a huge profit due to their relatively inexpensive price. Bandeirantes also teamed up with a local tribe, convincing them that they were on their side against another tribe, and when both sides were weakened the bandeirantes would capture both tribes and sell them into slavery.

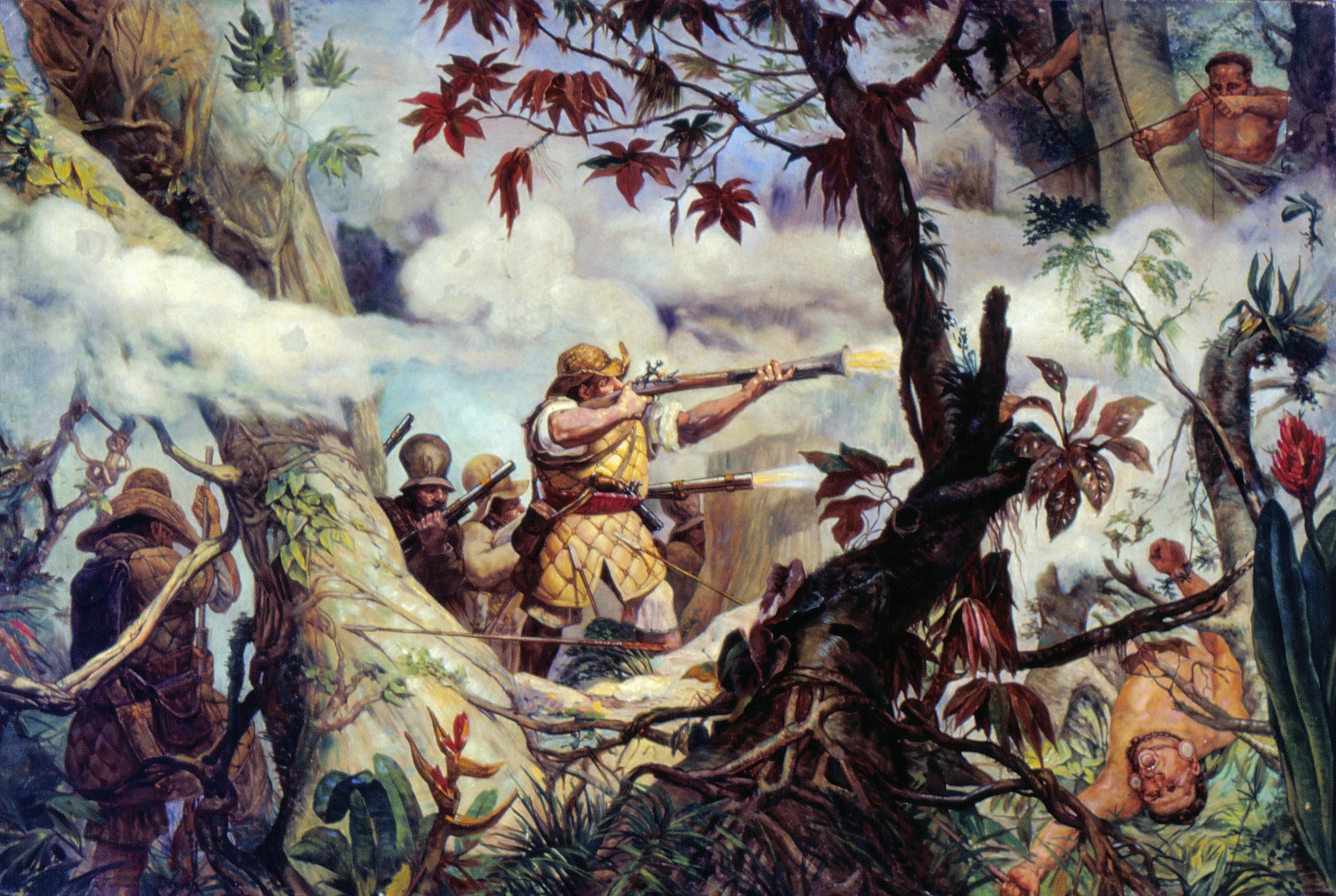
A battle between the militia of Mogi das Cruzes and the Botocudos

By the 17th century, Jesuit missions had become a favorite target of the expeditions. A bandeira that took place in 1628 and was organized by Tavares raided 21 Jesuit villages in the upper Paraná valley, ultimately capturing about 2,500 natives. In 1636, Tavares led a bandeira composed of 2,000 allied Indians, 900 mamelucos, and 69 white Paulistas, to find precious metals and stones and to capture Indians for slavery. This expedition alone was responsible for the destruction of most of the Jesuit missions of Spanish Guayrá and the enslavement of over 60,000 indigenous people.

Between 1648 and 1652, Tavares led one of the longest known expeditions from São Paulo to the mouth of the Amazon River, investigating many of its tributaries including the Rio Negro, ultimately covering a distance of more than 10,000 kilometers. The expedition traveled to Andean Quito, part of the Spanish Viceroyalty of Peru, and remained there for a short time in 1651. Of the 1,200 men who left São Paulo, only 60 reached their final destination in Belém.

== Relations with Jesuits ==
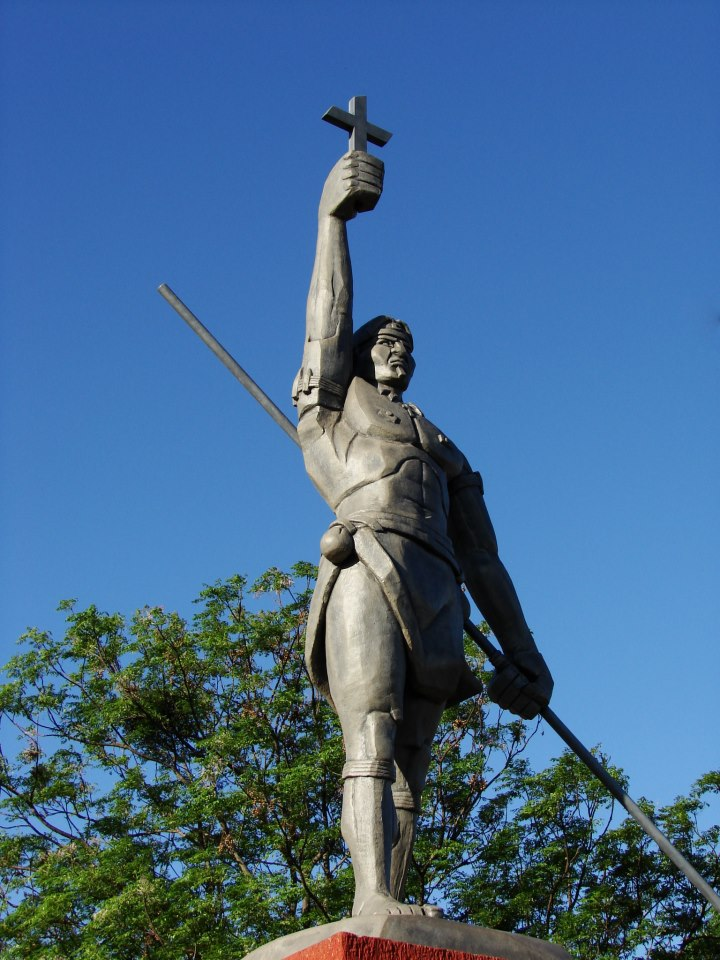
A monument to Sepé Tiaraju

The bandeirantes and the Jesuits did not agree on the treatment of the native people. The Jesuits wanted to convert the native population to Christianity, while the Bandeirantes wanted to sell the native population into slavery. Jesuit leader father Antonio Ruiz de Montoya attempted to lead 12,000 natives to safety into Argentina in an attempt to save them from bandeirantes.

With the death of Diego Alfaro by the hands of bandeirantes a conflict was sure to come between the two groups and it all came to head when Jerónimo Pedroso de Barros and Manuel Pires attacked a Jesuit camp. The Jesuits led by father Pedro Romero had a force of around 4,200, against a bandeirantes force of about 3,500. Romero repelled the assault. With the Treaty of Madrid (13 January 1750) Spain and Portugal agreed to dismantle the Jesuit missions called the Misiones Orientales. The Jesuits fought back against this order and lead to the Guaraní War which saw the Spanish and Portuguese fight against the native Guarani population.

Despite early failures due to guerrilla tactics, the Spanish and Portuguese attacked. José Joaquín de Viana defeated Guarani leader Sepé Tiaraju and destroyed the Jesuit mission camps. The battle ended the war. Portugal expelled the Jesuits from the country in 1759, ending the relations between the Jesuits and the bandeirantes.

== Fernão Dias Pais Leme ==
Bandeirante Fernão Dias was born in São Paulo in 1608 to a well-off family and spent much of his early life as a farmer in Pinheiros before becoming an income inspector in 1626. He was later called "The Emerald Hunter". In 1638, he joined Tavares on his expedition to the present states of Paraná, Santa Catarina, and Rio Grande do Sul. In 1644, Dias left on his own expedition.

In an expedition in 1661, in an attempt to find more natives to enslave, Dias explored south of the Anumarana mountain range into the Kingdom of Guaianás. Dias returned in 1665 with 4,000 slaves from three different tribes. During Dias's 1671 expedition he received his nickname, after he found emeralds in Sabarabuçu. In 1681, Dias died of disease while on an expedition in which he found tourmaline.

== Gold hunting ==
In addition to capturing natives as slaves, bandeiras helped to extend the power of Portugal by expanding its control over the Brazilian interior. Along with the exploration and settlement of this territory the bandeiras discovered mineral wealth for the Portuguese, which they had been previously unable to profit from.

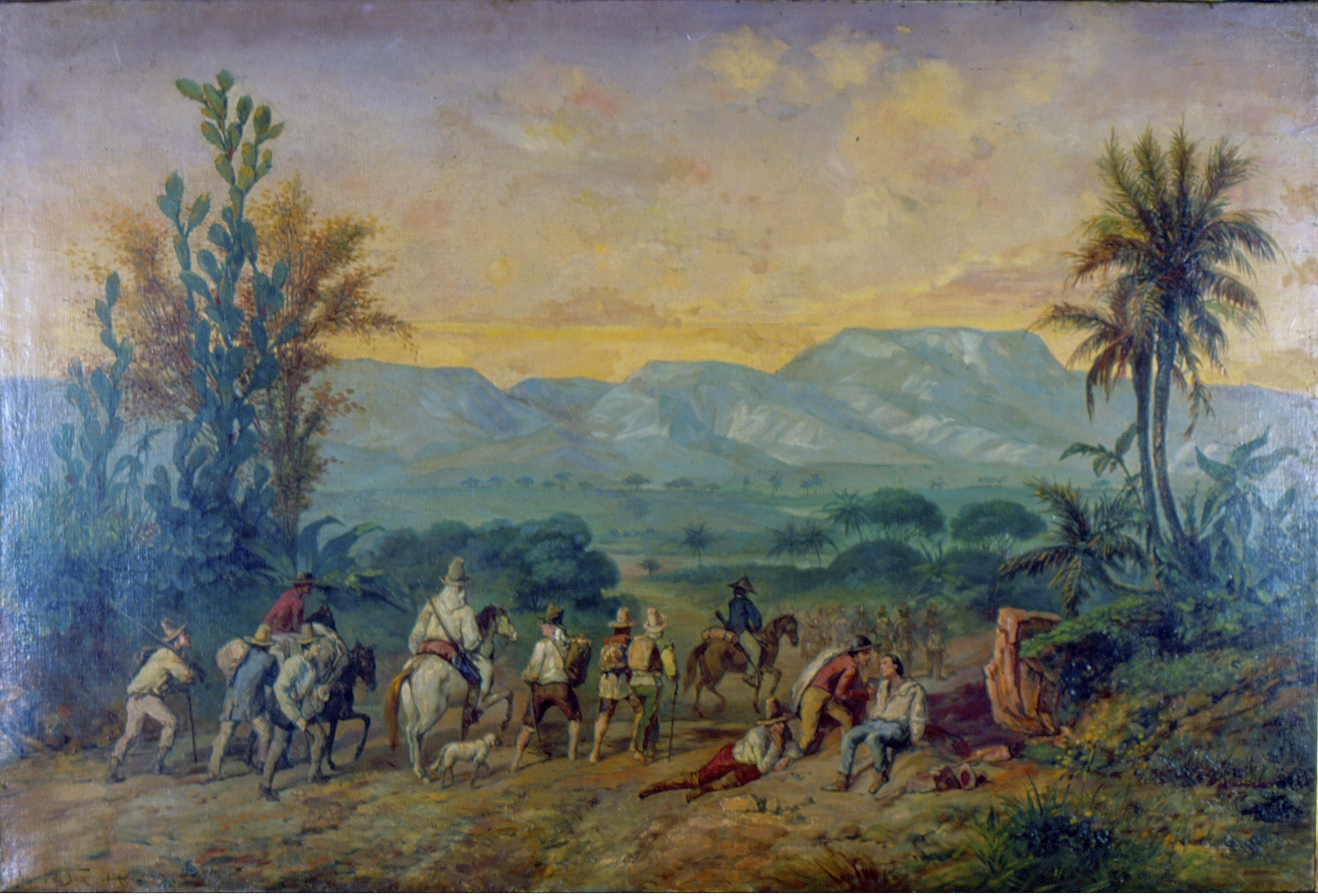
Expedition to the Brazilian interior in the 18th century

In the 1660s, the Portuguese government offered rewards to those who discovered gold and silver deposits in inner Brazil. The bandeirantes, driven by profit, ventured into the depths of Brazil to enslave natives and find mines and receive government rewards. As the number of natives diminished, the bandeirantes began to focus more intensely on finding minerals.

These explorations by the bandeirantes set in motion the Brazilian gold rush of the 1690s, one of the largest in the world which produced the largest gold mines in South America. Bandeirantes discovered gold in the mountains of Minas Gerais. This caused many people from the north of Brazil to go south in hopes of finding gold.

== Expansion to the south ==
The bandeirantes expanded towards the south as a result of the progressive occupation of the territory and wars.

== Legacy ==
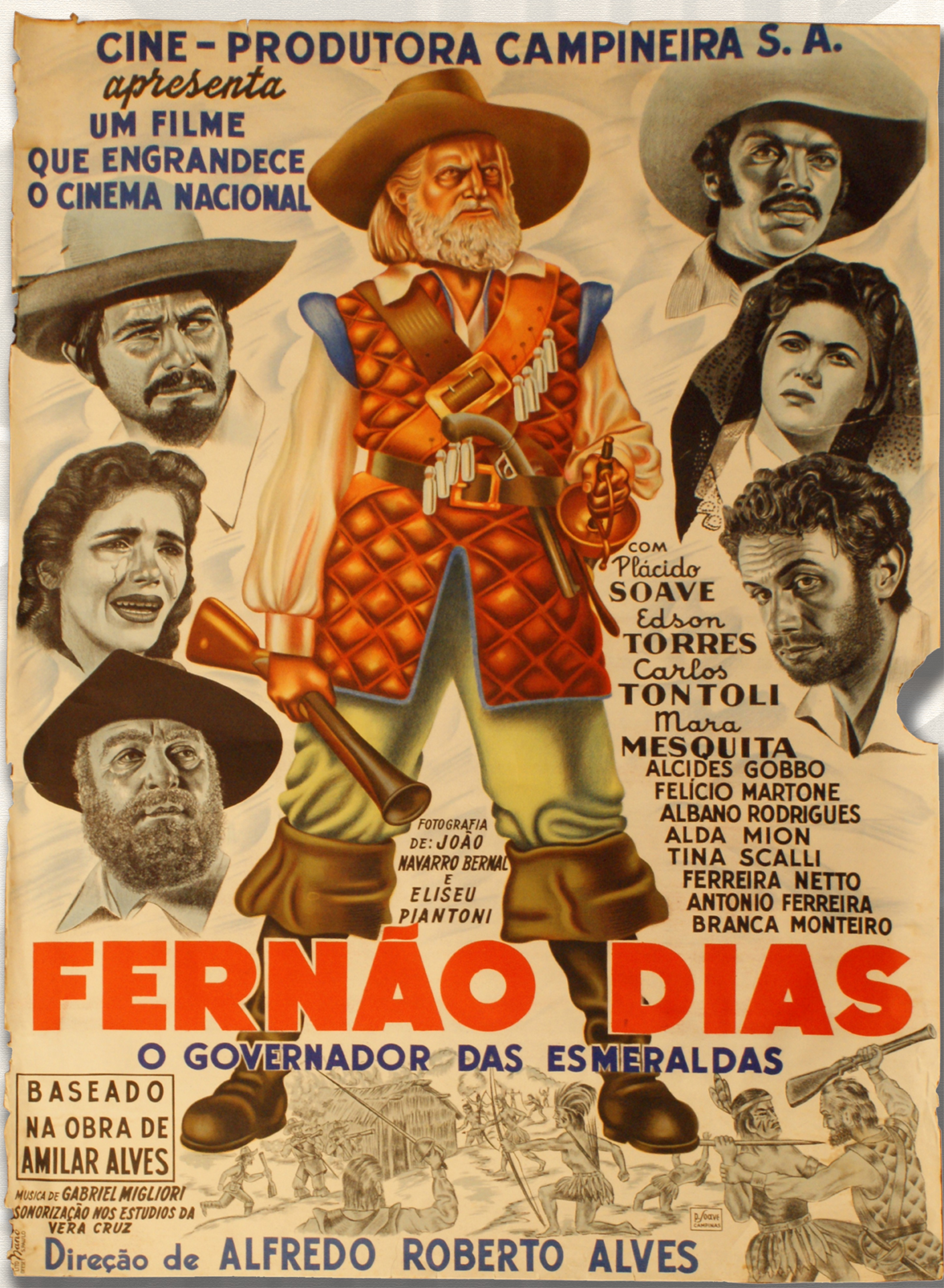
The 1979 film O Caçador de Esmeraldas

The bandeirantes were responsible for the discovery of mineral wealth, and, along with the missionaries, for the territorial enlargement of central and southern Brazil. This mineral wealth made Portugal wealthy during the 18th century. The Captaincy of São Vicente became the basis of the Viceroyalty of Brazil, which encompassed the current states of Santa Catarina, Paraná, São Paulo, Minas Gerais, Goiás, part of Tocantins, and Mato Grosso.

The bandeirantes were responsible for unsteady relations between the Spanish Empire and the Portuguese Empire, as they essentially conducted an undeclared war on indigenous residents allied with Spain or the Jesuits. With only a few outlying Spanish settlements surviving and the majority of Jesuit missions overrun, the de facto control by Portugal over most of what is now the Southeast, Southern, and Central West territory of Brazil was recognized by the Treaties of Madrid in 1750 and San Ildefonso in 1777. Portugal expelled the Jesuits in 1759, further reducing the ability of the Jesuits to fight back.

In spite of their ignorance of geography, a science unknown to the Paulistas of olden times, and with only the help of the sun, they penetrated the interior of the Americas, conquering tribes. Some went to the hinterland of Goias, as far as the Amazon river; others went all the way to the coast from the river Patos until the river Plate and as far as the rivers Uruguay and Tibagi; and going upstream along the Paraguay river as far as the Paraná [...] some crossed the vast hinterland beyond the Paraguay river all the way to the high mountains of the kingdom of Peru. The Paulistas had to fight against their enemies and against nature: in respect of the latter they had to battle against the weather and in respect of the former they had to battle against wrath and hate. The lack of supplies could have driven them to despair had it not been that they were used to eating the fruits of the hinterland: wild honey, wild nuts, sweet and bitter palmitos, and the roots of edible plants. (Pedro Taques de Almeida Paes Leme)

However, a new breed of men was growing, wild, yes, and ungovernable, but one in whom the infusion of native American blood would soon result in a relentless increase in action and achievement. So while the Spaniards in Paraguay stayed where Irala had placed them, mostly treating with indifference the discoveries which the first Conquistadores had made, the Brazilians continued for two centuries to explore the country. These determined adventurers would spend months and months in the wild hunting slaves and looking for gold and silver, guided by what they had learnt from the native Americans. Eventually they managed to secure for themselves and the House of Braganza the richest mines and the largest territory in South America. This acquisition was of all the inhabited earth the most beautiful part. (Robert Southey, 1819)

== 20th and 21st centuries ==
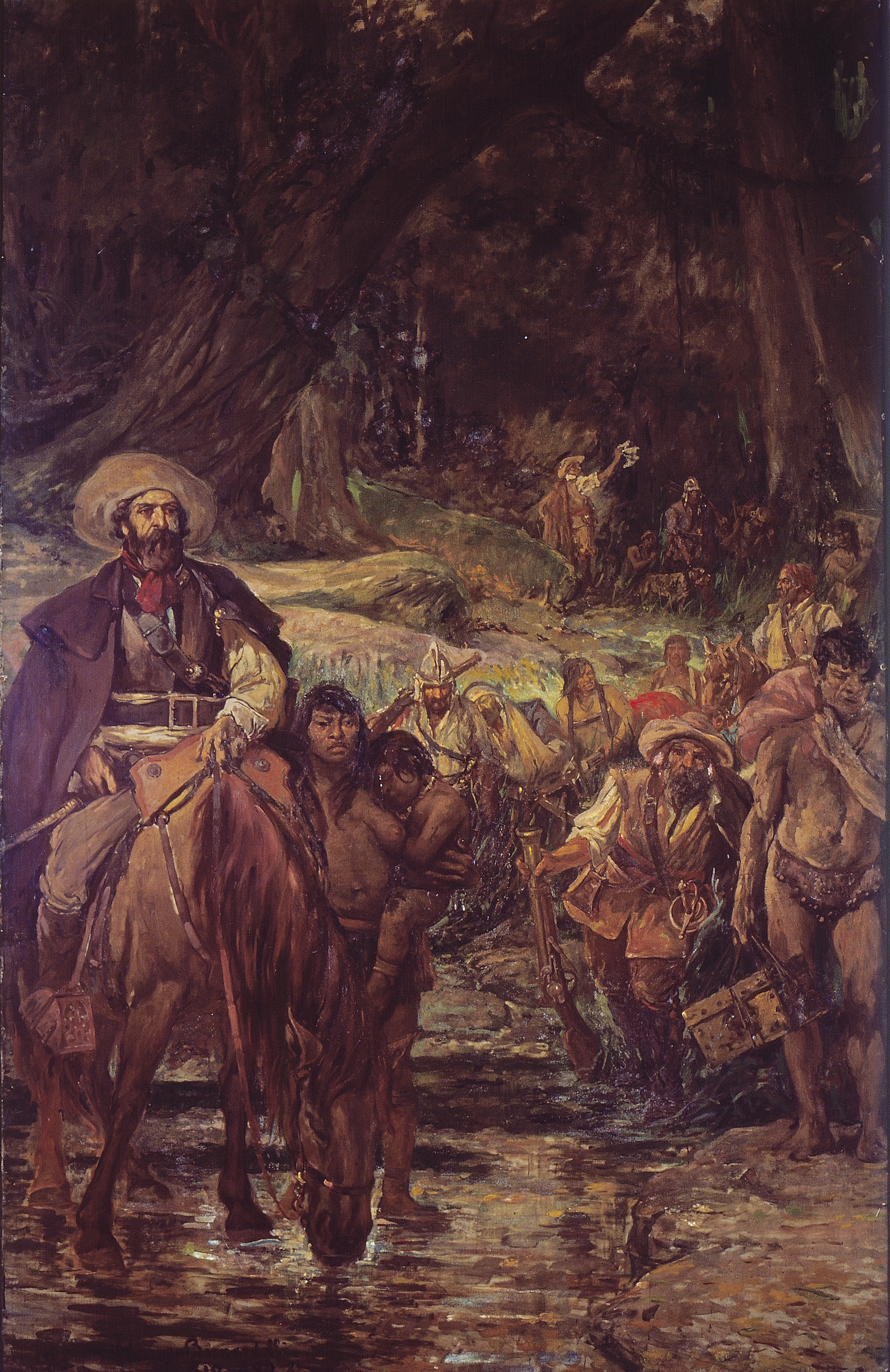
Retirada do Cabo de São Roque, painting by Henrique Bernardelli, 1927

Bandeirantes were an important part of the 1920s independence movement as they became a symbol of Brazilian pride. A large part of this movement was to show the bandeirantes as pure Brazilian and that they represented bravery and their sense of achievement. Many poems, paintings, movies, and books were made about bandeirantes. Many statues were raised, including the São Paulo's Monumento às bandeiras.

In the 21st century, there have been calls to stop celebrating the bandeirantes. Guards have been deployed in Brazil to protect the statues of bandeirantes from vandalism. The statues have been criticized for celebrating the bandeirantes for their practice of enslaving the native population. This new wave is trying to confront Brazil's controversial past and their practice of glorifying slave traders.

On 24 July 2021, protesters, in response to Brazilians president Jair Bolsonaro's nationalist rhetoric, set fire to a statue of Borba Gato in São Paulo. The call for statue removal is not limited to Brazil—other countries in South America have also called for the removal of statues that depict slavery in a positive light.

Several bandeirantes were honored by the Paulistas by naming important highways in the State of São Paulo, such as Rodovia Fernão Dias, Rodovia Raposo Tavares, Rodovia Anhanguera and Rodovia dos Bandeirantes.

== Notable bandeirantes ==
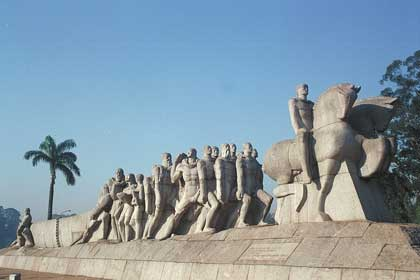
Monument to the Bandeiras in São Paulo, Brazil

- João Ramalho
- Domingos Jorge Velho
- Antônio Rodrigues de Arzão
- Antônio Alvarenga
- António Raposo Tavares
- Bartolomeu Bueno da Silva (the Anhanguera)
- Manuel de Borba Gato
- Brás Leme
- Fernão Dias Pais ("the Emerald hunter")
- Gabriel de Lara

Another list of well-known bandeirantes includes

- Antônio Dias de Oliveira
- Domingos Rodrigues do Prado
- Salvador Furtado Fernandes de Mendonça
- Estêvão Ribeiro Baião Parente
- Brás Rodrigues de Arzão
- Manuel de Campos Bicudo
- Francisco Dias de Siqueira (the Apuçá)
- Pascoal Moreira Cabral
- Antônio Pires de Campos
- Francisco Pedroso Xavier
- Lourenço Castanho Taques
- Tomé Portes del-Rei
- Antonio Garcia da Cunha
- Matias Cardoso de Almeida
- Salvador Faria de Albernaz
- José de Camargo Pimentel
- João Leite da Silva Ortiz
- João de Siqueira Afonso
- Jerônimo Pedroso de Barros and
- Bartolomeu Bueno de Siqueira.

== See also ==
- Bandeirantes (disambiguation)
- São Paulo (state)#History
- Slavery in Brazil
- Brazilian gold rush, 1695–mid-1700s
- El Dorado, the "Lost City of Gold"
- European colonization of the Americas
- Potosí#History and silver extraction, Spanish motherlode of silver in Bolivia
- Degredados
- Sertanista House

== Bibliography ==
- Leme, Luís Gonzaga da Silva, "Genealogia Paulistana" (1903–1905)
- Leme, Pedro Taques de Almeida Paes, "Nobiliarquia Paulistana Histórica e Genealógica", Ed. São Paulo University (1980, São Paulo).
- Taunay, Afonso de E., "Relatos Sertanistas", Ed. São Paulo University (1981, São Paulo) *
- Taunay, Afonso de E., "História das Bandeiras Paulistas", Ed. Melhoramentos (São Paulo)
- Franco, Francisco de Assis Carvalho, "Dicionário de Bandeirantes e Sertanistas do Brasil", Ed. São Paulo University, São Paulo, Ed Itatiaia, Belo Horizonte (1989)
- Deus, Frei Gaspar da Madre de, "História da Capitania de São Vicente", Ed. São Paulo University (1975, São Paulo)
- Crow, John A., "The Epic of Latin America", (London, 1992)
- Hemming, John, "Red Gold: The Conquest of the Brazilian Indians, 1500–1760 (London, 1978)
