= Honorio =

Honorio or Honório may refer to:

== Given names ==
- Honorio Alarcón (1859–1920), Colombian pianist
- Honório Barreto (1813–1859), governor of the Portuguese province of Guinea
- Honorio Bórquez (1947–2014), Chilean boxer
- Honório de Freitas Guimarães (1902–1968), member of the Brazilian Communist Party
- Honorio Delgado (1892–1969), Peruvian researcher and philosopher
- Honorio Henríquez (born 1971), Colombian politician, lawyer and public official
- Honório Hermeto Carneiro Leão, Marquis of Paraná (1801–1856), Brazilian monarchist politician
- Honorio Machado (born 1982), Venezuelan racing cyclist
- Honório Novo (born 1950), Portuguese politician and retired secondary school teacher
- Honorio Pueyrredón (1876–1945), Argentine politician and diplomat
- Honorio Rúa (born 1934), Colombian cyclist
- Honorio Siccardi (1897–1963), Argentine composer, pianist and teacher

== Middle names ==
- Bruna Honorio Da Silva (born 1989), Brazilian volleyball player
- Márcia Honório da Silva (born 1962), Brazilian coach and footballer

== Surnames ==
- Cecília Honório (born 1962), Portuguese politician
- Coutinho (footballer, born 1943), full name Antônio Wilson Vieira Honório (1943–2019), Brazilian coach and footballer
- Felipe Ferreira de Moraes Honorio (born 1988), Brazilian footballer
- Gabriel Honório (born 1996), Brazilian footballer
- Humberto Honorio (born 1983), Brazilian–Italian futsal player
- José Honório (1973–2026), East Timorese university lecturer and politician
- Mateus Alonso Honorio (born 1983), Brazilian footballer
- Tiago Jorge Honorio (born 1977), Brazilian footballer

== Places ==
- Honório Bicalho, a community in the state of Minas Gerais, Brazil
- Honório Gurgel, a working-class neighborhood in Rio de Janeiro, Brazil
- Honório Serpa, a municipality in the state of Paraná, Brazil

== Other uses ==
- Anitta: Made in Honório, a 2020 Netflix original docuseries
- Don Honorio Ventura State University, former name of Pampanga State University, a state university in Bacolor, Pampanga, Philippines
- Grupo Honorio, a group of Argentine diplomats of the Radical Civic Union
- Honorio Bustos Domecq, a pseudonym used collaboratively by Jorge Luis Borges and Adolfo Bioy Casares
