= Batatais (disambiguation) =

Batatais is a municipality in São Paulo, Brazil

Batatais may also refer to:

- Batatais Futebol Clube, Brazilian football club
- Batatais (footballer) (1910-1960), full name Algisto Lorenzato, Brazilian football goalkeeper
- Anderson Batatais (born 1972), Brazilian football centre-back
- Marcelo Batatais (born 1974), Brazilian football centre-back
