= Honório Bicalho =

- Village
- Location within Brazil
- Coordinates: 20.022102°S 43.824432°W
- Country: Brazil
- State: Minas Gerais
- Municipality: Nova Lima
- Time zone: UTC-3 (BRT)
  - Summer (DST): UTC-2 (BRST)

Honório Bicalho is a community in the state of Minas Gerais, Brazil, in the municipality of Nova Lima. The Rio das Velhas runs through the community from south to north.

== Railway ==
The Estrada de Ferro Central do Brasil was the first railway line to be built by the emperor Pedro II of Brazil, and was a backbone of the Brazilian railway system. The first stretch was opened in 1858. The Honório Bicalho station was opened in 1890, named after the engineer Honório Bicalho, who was involved in various public works on ports and railways. The station has been abandoned, although the tracks remain. The station was demolished in the late 1990s.

== Mining operations ==
The Saint John d'El Rey Mining Company operated the Gaia, Faria and Gabirobas gold mines southwest of Honório Bicalho and the Bicalho mine at Honório Bicalho. The company bought the Fernan Paes estate to the west of Honorio Bicalho around 1863 and worked the Gaia and Gabirobas mines between 1867 and 1873, after which mining halted. The company drove an exploration adit in the Bicalho mine in 1925. In 1936 the mine was pumped out and exploration continued to a depth of 610 metres (2,000 ft). The company started to drive an adit known locally as the Gaia tunnel from the west side of the Rio das Velhas at Honorio Bicalho in 1934, running in a west-southwest direction. It was meant to drain water from the old Gaia mine and provide access to deeper levels of that mine. In 1935 the adit was extended further to the west-southwest, and reached the foot of the Faria mine in 1936.

== Sources ==
- Jacob E. Gair (1949), "Geology and ore deposits of the Nova Lima and Rio Acima quadrangles, Minas Gerais, Brazil", Geological Survey Professional Paper, U.S. Government Printing Office
- Ralph Mennucci Giesbrecht (22 October 2011), "Honório Bicalho", Estações Ferroviárias do Brasil (in Portuguese)
