= Batatais =

Municipality in the state of São Paulo in Brazil

- Municipality
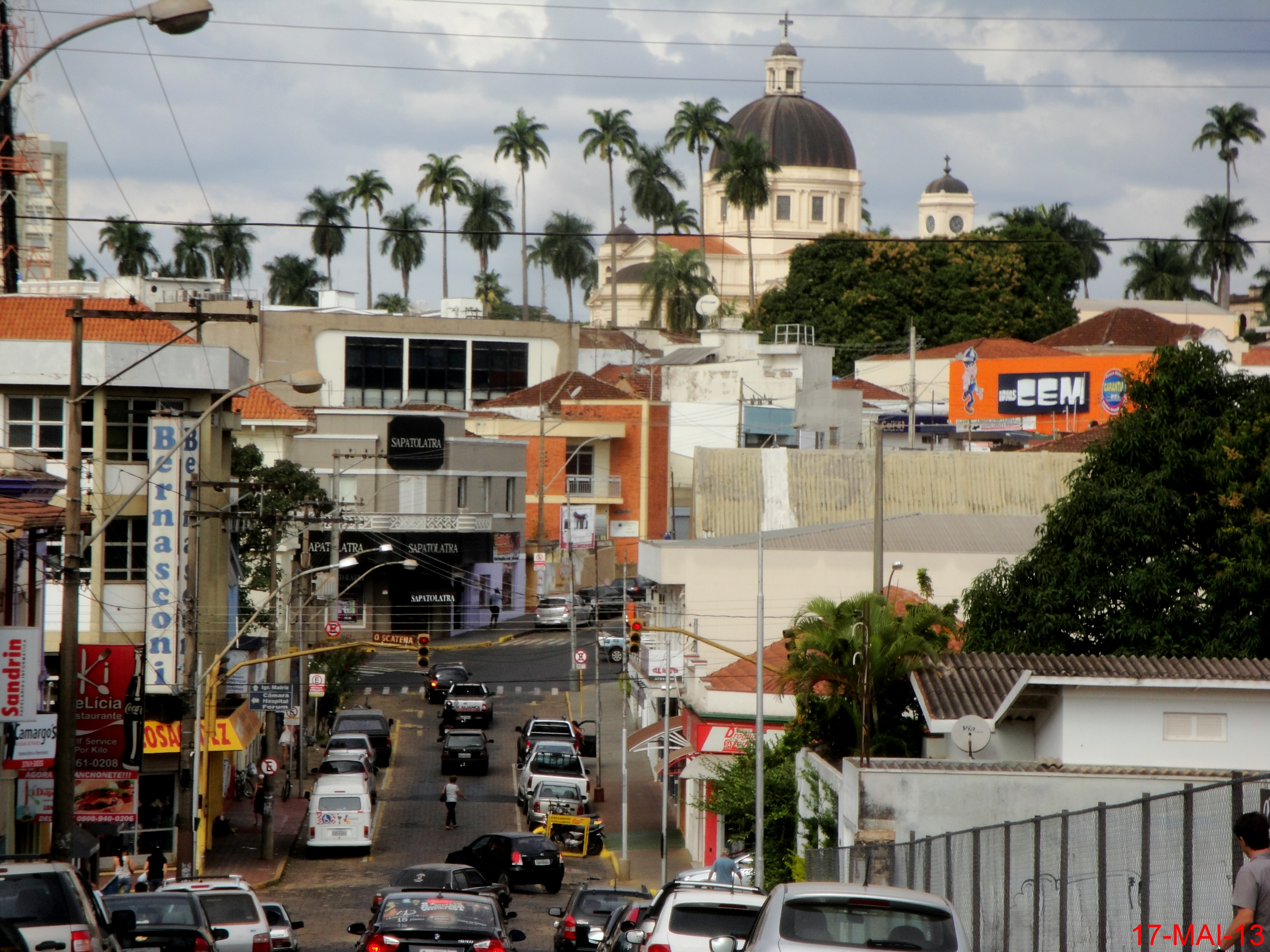

- Flag Coat of arms

- Location in São Paulo state

- Location in Brazil
- Coordinates: 20°53′28″S 47°35′6″W
- Country: Brazil
- Region: Southeast
- State: São Paulo

Area
  - Total: 850 km^{2} (330 sq mi)

Population (2020)
  - Total: 62,980
  - Density: 74/km^{2} (190/sq mi)
- Time zone: UTC−3 (BRT)
- Postal code: 14300-000
- Area code: +55 16

Batatais is a municipality in the state of São Paulo in Brazil.

== History ==
The settlement became a town and an independent municipality on March 14, 1839, when it was separated from Franca. It became a city in 1875. Washington Luís, president of Brazil around 1929, was the city mayor in 1899.

=== Theories on the origin of the name ===
There are at least four theories for the meaning of the name "Batatais":

- The most accepted one is based on historical reports, linked to the Native Americans that lived there and their agricultural activity. The Bandeirantes may have found a large culture of purple sweet potatoes (Batatais sounds like Batatas, "potatoes").
- Another version came from the Native American language spoken there, and the name came from the word "BAITATA", which means according to some experts "river running through the rocks", meaning the waterfalls that exists there.
- A third version also from the Native American language spoken there says that the name came from the word "MBOITATA", snake of fire, which on the native belief was the god that protects the field from fires. This version can be also verified due to some small gas fields that exists around the city, which may generate fireballs due to the heat occasionally.
- Some recent studies also brings another possible version: Batatais or Batatal was an expression used by the old miners to describe the place where gold can be found at the surface. As this region was part of the old way to the Goias mines, it is possible that the city was a rest place for the travelers.

== Geography ==
The city has an area of 850 km^{2} (328 sq mi). The elevation is 862 m. The city is in Brazil's sugarcane belt.

== Demographics ==
Historical population (municipality)
Year	Population	%±
1920	21,816
1940	20,070	−8.0%
1950	21,677	8.0%
1960	26,812	23.7%
1970	29,262	9.1%
1980	37,283	27.4%
1991	44,106	18.3%
2000	51,112	15.9%
2010	56,476	10.5%
2022	58,402	3.4%

In 2020 the population is about 62,980. The population is mostly formed by Italian-Brazilians. There is commemorated the "San Gennaro Party" that is an example of culture predominance.

== Notable people ==
- Algisto Lorenzato, footballer, known as Batatais
- Baldocchi, footballer, world champion (1970)
- Zéca Lopes, footballer
- Marcelo Batatais, footballer
- Nhanhá, footballer

== See also ==
- List of municipalities in São Paulo
- Interior of São Paulo
