= Barão de Cocais =

Coordinates: 19°56′45″S 43°29′13″W

- Municipality
- Municipality of Barão de Cocais
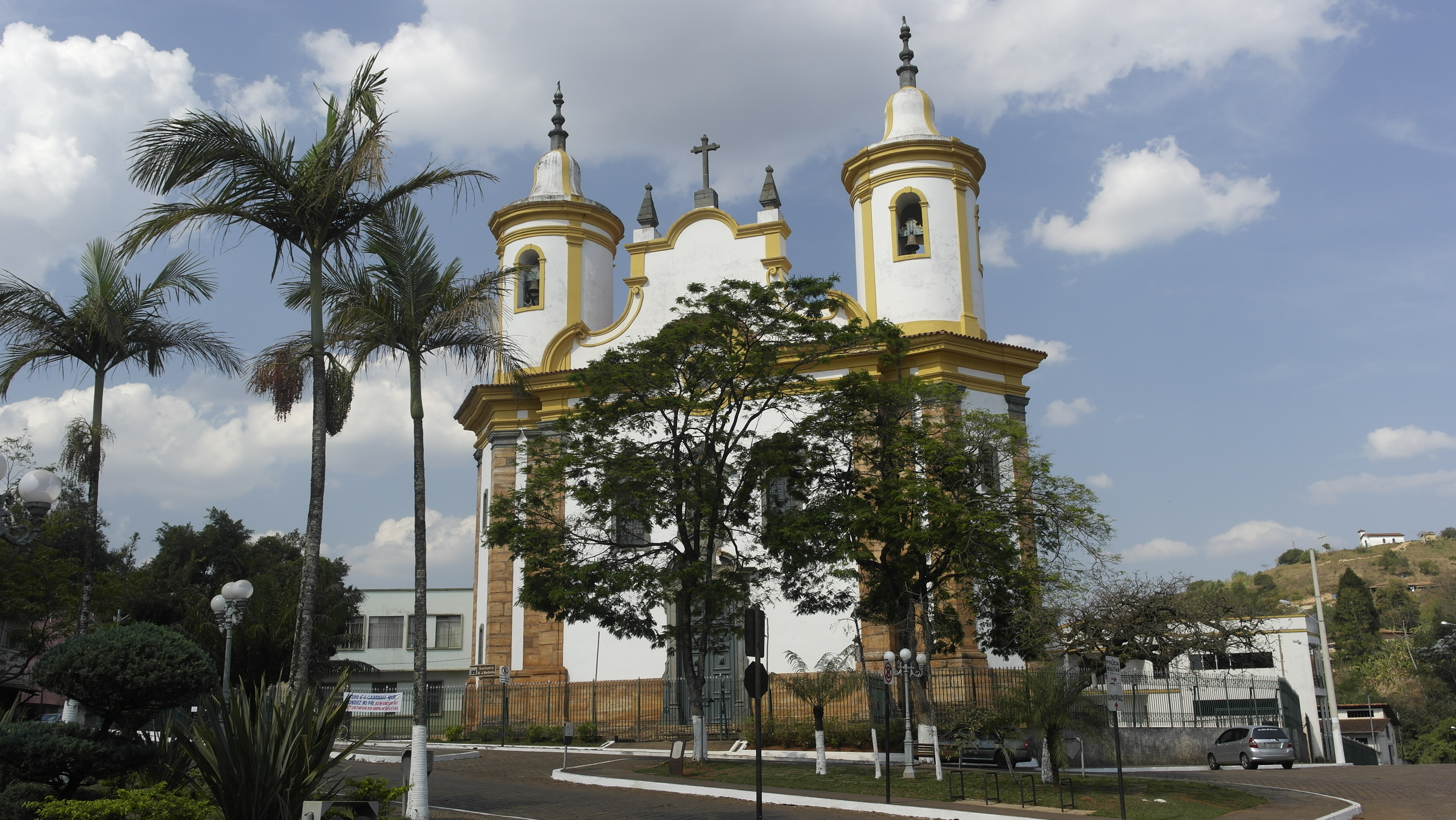

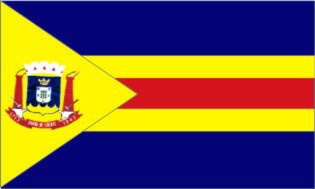
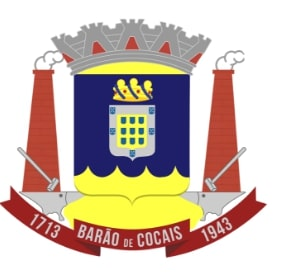
- Flag Coat of arms

- Country: Brazil
- Region: Southeast
- State: Minas Gerais
- Founded: 24 June 1704

Government
  - Mayor: Décio Geraldo dos Santos (PSB)

Area
  - Total: 340.585 km^{2} (131.501 sq mi)

Population (2022 Census)
  - Total: 30,778
  - Estimate (2025): 32,264
  - Density: 83.51/km^{2} (216.3/sq mi)
- Demonym: cocaiense
- Time zone: UTC−3 (BRT)
- Postal Code: 35970-000 to 35983-999
- HDI (2010): 0.722 – high
- Website: www.baraodecocais.mg.gov.br

Barão de Cocais is a Brazilian municipality located in the state of Minas Gerais. Its population as of 2020 is estimated to be 32,866 people living in an altitude between 682 and 1425 meters. The area of the municipality is 340.675 square kilometres (131.535 sq mi). The city belongs to the mesoregion Metropolitana de Belo Horizonte and to the microregion of Itabira.

The municipality contains the Gongo Soco mine, once a gold mine and later a large iron ore operation, which closed in April 2016.

== See also ==
- List of municipalities in Minas Gerais
