= Saint John d'El Rey Mining Company =

Coordinates: 19.985833°S 43.846944°W

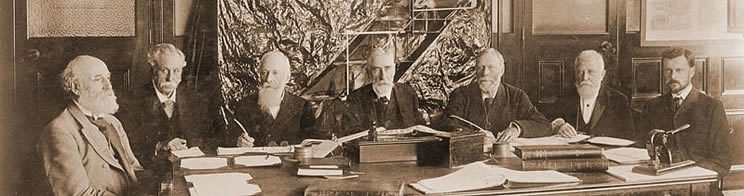
- Directors meeting in London c. 1890
- Industry: Gold mining
- Founded: April 1830
- Defunct: 1985
- Headquarters: London, England
- Area served: Minas Gerais, Brazil
- Products: Gold

The Saint John d'El Rey Mining Company was a British mining company that operated in Brazil in the 19th and 20th centuries. The company employed skilled miners from Cornwall and elsewhere in Britain in its gold mines in the state of Minas Gerais, and also employed black slaves. Established in April 1830, the company primarily operated the Morro Velho mine and was formally closed in 1985.

== Background ==
Location of Nova Lima in Brazil

The Nova Lima and Rio Acima quadrangles to the east and southeast of Belo Horizonte, Minas Gerais, were an important source of gold in the 19th and 20th centuries. The climate is subtropical, with average daytime temperatures ranging from 18 to 22 °C (64 to 72 °F) and average rainfall about 1,500 millimetres (59 in) per year. The Rio das Velhas is the main river, running northward though the two quadrangles. The terrain is fairly rugged, with peaks rising to 1,380 metres (4,530 ft), just over 680 metres (2,230 ft) above the river. Old gold washings from the colonial period are found along the Rio das Velhas. There are many small abandoned gold mines and explorations, some worked before the second half of the 19th century, often with no surviving records. The main settlements are Nova Lima, Sabará, Rio Acima and Raposos.

== History ==
The Saint John d'El Rey Mining Company (Note: Different sources give the name of the Saint John d'El Rey Mining Company as the Saint John Del Rey Mining Company, St. John d'el Rey Mining Co., S. João d'El-Rei Mining Company etc.) was established in Britain in April 1830 as a joint stock company. John Diston Powles served as the company's first chairman. It obtained a lease to work the São João del-Rei mines in Minas Gerais from the owners, three British merchants and a German physician. In June and July 1830 a group of Cornish miners travelled to Brazil to work the mines. The venture ran into problems with low-grade ore and legal disputes, and was closed within two years.

The company searched for other mining properties in the region, and bought the Morro Velho gold mine in 1834. The Morro Velho mine had been worked for perhaps 50 years before the Saint John Company acquired it, at first as an open pit operation. The company also bought the Raposos mines and other properties. Properties owned by the St. John del Rey Mining Co. included the Morro das Bicas mine just south of Raposos, the Bella Fama mine about 2 kilometres (1.2 mi) southeast of Nova Lima, the Gaia, Faria and Gabirobas mines southwest of Honório Bicalho, the Bicalho mine at Honório Bicalho and the Urubu mine about 3 kilometres (1.9 mi) south-southeast of Honório Bicalho.

In 1845 the company made an agreement with the Cata Branca company to rent 385 slaves for a period of 14 years. It said "all of the said Negroes... shall at the end of such term of fourteen years be and become absolutely free and emancipated." When the term of fourteen years was completed in 1859 the clause was quietly forgotten. An 1879 report opened by saying, "One of the last acts of injustice and inhumanity which one would naturally expect from an enlightened and just people would be an illegal retention of freedmen in Slavery by Englishmen." It went on to state that, "The S. João d'El-Rei Mining Company has at this day, fully two hundred blacks in Slavery, who were made free and emancipated in the year 1859, by a contract made in 1845, to which this same Company was a party...". Soon after this the Brazilian authorities freed the slaves under pressure from local abolitionists. The case was one of the early events leading to full abolition of slavery in Brazil in 1888.

== Mines ==
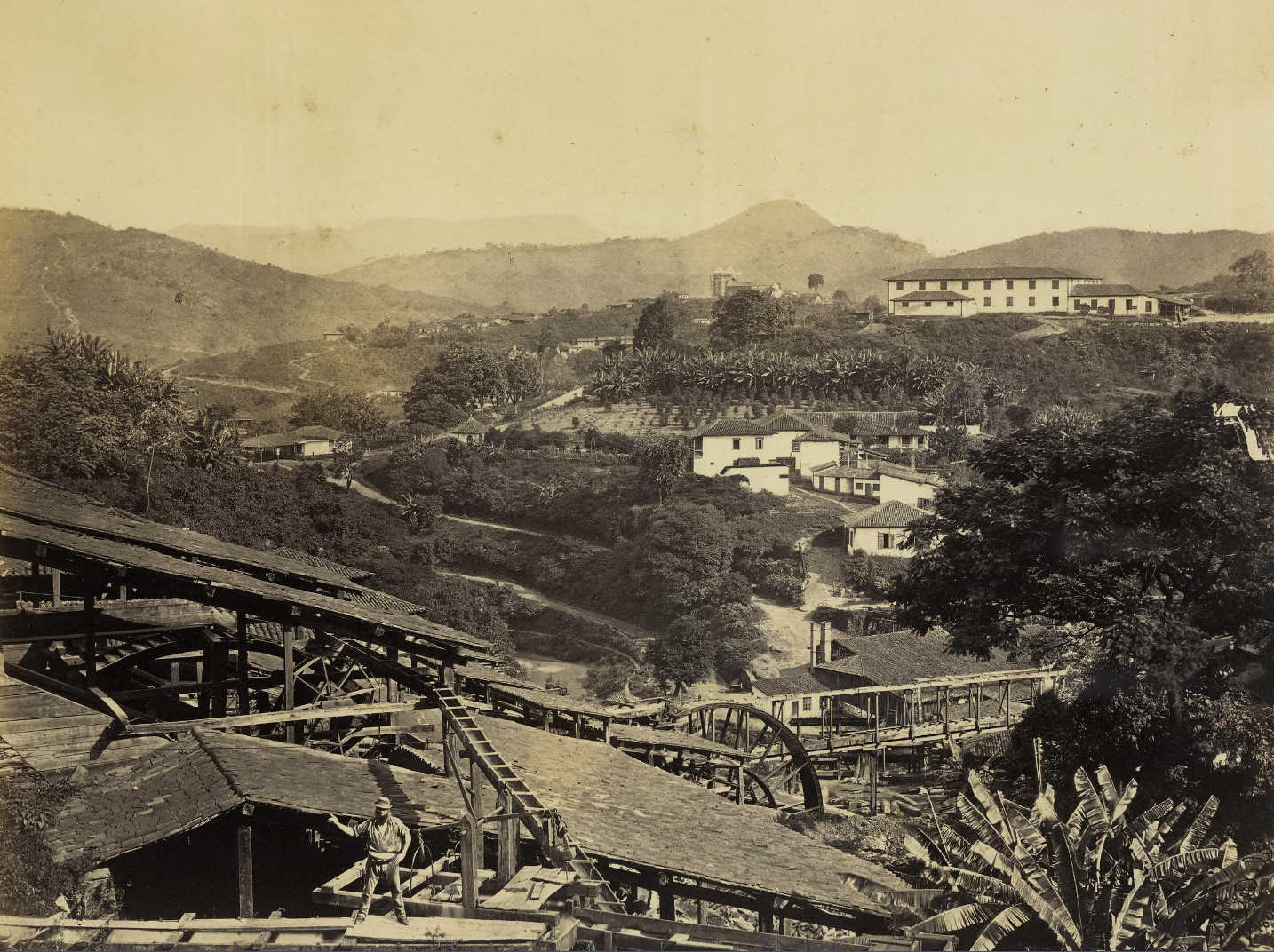
Morro Velho around 1869

=== Morro Velho ===
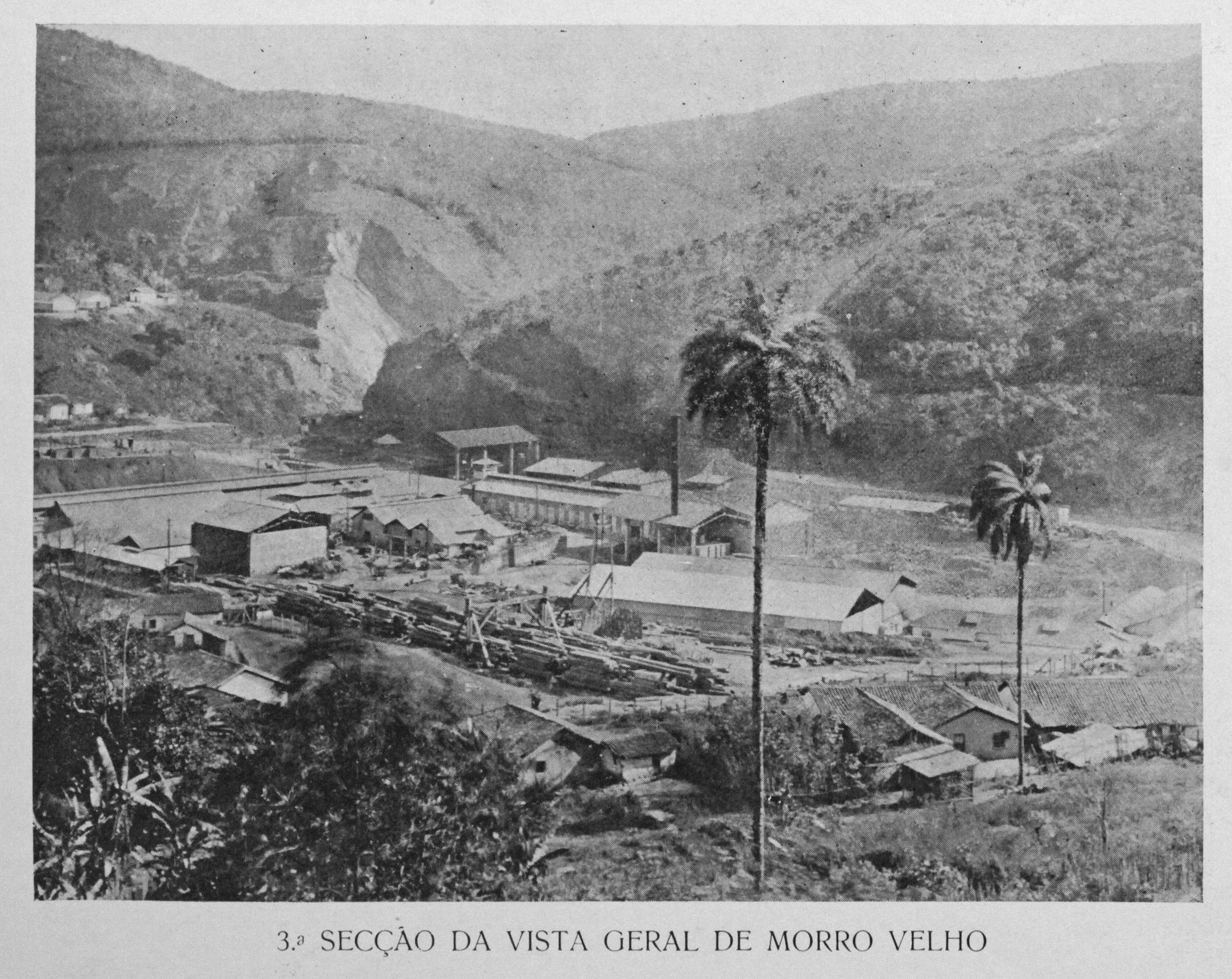
Morro Velho in 1907

The Morro Velho mine is in a low valley near Nova Lima, about 12 miles (19 km) from Belo Horizonte. The company invested significant amounts into improving infrastructure, and quickly increased production. The first dividends were paid in 1842. The company encouraged British miners to come to work in Brazil, and employed slaves until they were emancipated in the late 19th century. After the Gongo Soco mine closed in 1856 some of the Cornish miners found work in Brazilian mines operated by the Saint John d'El Rey Mining Company. The Cornish formed the majority of British miners at Morro Velho, numbering about 350 in the 1860s.

A fire caused the mine to collapse in 1867, and it took seven years to bring it back into operation. In the 1870s the superintendent was found to be engaged in fraud and had to be fired. A rock fall in 1886 caused the mine to collapse again, and the company went into temporary liquidation. The mine was reopened and again became profitable in the 1890s. At one time the Morro Velho mine was the deepest in the world, as 2,545 metres (8,350 ft) below the entrance adit. After the revolution of 1930 a miner's union was formed. Strikes reduced production and the infrastructure fell into disrepair.

=== Raposos mines ===
Systematic exploration of the area around the Raposos mines to the east of Morro Velho seems to have started shortly before 1910. By 1930 the main lodes that had been discovered were the Mina Grande and Espirito Santo lodes, both west of the das Velhas River, and the Morro das Bicas lode about 1 kilometre (0.62 mi) south of Raposas on the east of the Rio das Velhas. 23,404 tons of ore were extracted from the Raposos mines between 1910 and 1928, from which 8,388 ounces (237,800 g) of gold were extracted. Mining at the Morro das Bicas was suspended in the early 1930s but continued at the other mines, which were important producers. As of 1955 the main lodes were the Espiritu Santo, Mina Grande and Espiritu West, which were connected by underground workings and had reached a depth of about 640 metres (2,100 ft). At the end of 1955 the Raposos mines had total reserves of 1,694,080 metric tons of ore with an average of 9.5 grams of gold per ton.

=== Other mines ===
The company drove an exploration adit in the Bicalho mine in 1925, and seems to have opened a lode before halting operations. In 1936 the mine was pumped out and exploration continued to a depth of 610 metres (2,000 ft). 36,800 tons of ore gave 8,238 ounces of gold in 1940–41, and 40,700 tons of ore was processed in 1942–43. There was no activity in 1944-45, 200 tons extracted in 1946, after which operations stopped. The company bought the Fernan Paes estate to the west of Honorio Bicalho around 1863 and began working the Gaia and Gabirobas mines. 5,777 ounces of gold were produced between 1867 and 1873, after which mining halted. Some exploration was resuming in 1887 after the Morro Velho mine collapsed, but results were discouraging.

The Faria mine, about 1 kilometre (0.62 mi) south of the Gabirobas mine, was developed and worked by a French company for a short period around 1900. The Saint John Company began to pump out and explore this mine in 1931. The company started to drive an adit known locally as the Gaia tunnel from the west side of the Rio das Velhas at Honorio Bicalho in 1934, running in a west-southwest direction. It was meant to unwater the old Gaia mine and provide access to deeper levels of that mine. In 1935 the adit was extended further to the west-southwest, and reached the foot of the Faria mine in 1936. The Gabirobas mine was pumped out in 1936 and explored for 30 metres (98 ft) below the original workings, and the Gaia mines was explored to 30 metres (98 ft) below the Gaia tunnel. There explorations were stopped in 1937 due to the low price of gold. The company continued to develop the Faria mine, and began regular production in 1940. Between 1940 and 1947, when production was suspended, 176,286 tons of ore were milled.

== Dissolution ==
As of 1957 there were two active mines, the Morro Velho mine at Nova Lima and the Raposos group near Raposos. That year a group of investors bought a controlling interest in the company and sold its iron properties to the Hanna Mining Company of Cleveland, Ohio. The company was formally closed in 1985.

== Sources ==
- Matt D. Childs (Summer 1998), "A Case of 'Great Unstableness': A British Slaveholder and Brazilian Abolition", The Historian, 60 (4)
- "Gongo Soco", The Cornish in Latin America, University of Exeter
- Jacob E. Gair (1949), "Geology and ore deposits of the Nova Lima and Rio Acima quadrangles, Minas Gerais, Brazil", Geological Survey Professional Paper, U.S. Government Printing Office
- Marshall G. Eakin (November 1986), "Business Imperialism and British Enterprise in Brazil: The St. John d'el Rey Mining Company, Limited, 1830-1960", The Hispanic American Historical Review, 66 (4)
- "Morro Velho", The Cornish in Latin America, University of Exeter
- Rio News (1882), Brazil and English slave-holders. St. John del Rey gold mining co.
- Saint John d'El Rey Mining Company Records, University of Texas Libraries
