= Villa Nova Atlético Clube =

Villa Nova
- Full name: Villa Nova Atlético Clube
- Nicknames: Leão (Lion); Leão do Bonfim (Lion of Bonfim); Alvirrubro (Red & white); Glorioso (The glorious)
- Founded: 28 June 1908
- Ground: Castor Cifuentes, Nova Lima, Brazil
- Capacity: 15,000
- Chairman: Bruno Sarti
- Manager: Ricardo Drubscky
- League: Campeonato Mineiro
- 2025: Mineiro, 12th of 12 (relegated)
Home colours	Away colours	Third colours

Villa Nova Atlético Clube, commonly known as Villa Nova, is a Brazilian professional football club based in Nova Lima, Minas Gerais. The team plays in Série D, the fourth tier of the Brazilian football league system, as well as in the Campeonato Mineiro, the top tier of the Minas Gerais state football league.

== History ==
Villa Nova is the second oldest active club of Minas Gerais. The club was founded on 28 June 1908, in Nova Lima, by English factory workers and miners of Morro Velho Mining Inc.

The 1930s were the club's greatest era. Villa Nova won its first state title in 1932 and won the first three championships in the professional era, in 1933, 1934 and 1935. The yellow star in the club's logo allude to these titles.

Villa won the Campeonato Mineiro again in 1951, defeating Atlético Mineiro in the finals at Independência. Martim Francisco, coach of the club in 1951, was pointed out as the inventor of 4-2-4 in the book 'Inverting The Pyramid' by Jonathan Wilson, which chronicles the evolution of football tactics.

In 1971, Villa Nova won the Campeonato Brasileiro Série B first edition, after beating Remo in the final. The green star in their logo symbolizes this national title.

== Stadium ==
Villa Nova's stadium is Estádio Castor Cifuentes, also known as "Alçapão do Bonfim". It was built in 1908 and rebuilt in 1989. Currently, has a maximum capacity of 15000 people.

== Honours ==
=== Official tournaments ===
National
Competitions	Titles	Seasons
Campeonato Brasileiro Série B	1	1971
State
Competitions	Titles	Seasons
Campeonato Mineiro	5	1932, 1933, 1934, 1935, 1951
Taça Minas Gerais	2	1977, 2006
Campeonato Mineiro Módulo II	3	1995, 2021, 2026

=== Others tournaments ===
==== National ====
- Torneio Quadrangular de Salvador (1): 1951-II

==== State ====
- Torneio Incentivo Mineiro (2): 1976, 1987
- Campeonato Mineiro do Interior (4): 1984, 1997, 1998, 1999
- Torneio Início do Campeonato Mineiro (5): 1930, 1932, 1935, 1946, 1953

=== Runners-up ===
- Torneio Centro-Sul (1): 1968
- Campeonato Mineiro (6): 1937, 1945, 1946, 1947, 1953, 1997
- Taça Minas Gerais (2): 2009, 2012
