= Morro Velho =

Gold mine in Brazil

- Location in Brazil Morro Velho Gold Mine (Minas Gerais)
- Location: Nova Lima, Minas Gerais, Brazil; 19°35′S 43°31′W
- Products: Gold, silver, arsenic
- Production: 329,000
- Financial year: 2009
- Opened: 1835
- Company: AngloGold Ashanti
- Website: AngloGold Ashanti website

Morro Velho, also called AngloGold Ashanti Brasil Mineração, after its current owner AngloGold Ashanti, is a complex of gold mines located near the city of Nova Lima in Minas Gerais, Brazil.

It is one of two mining operations of the company in Brazil, the other being the Serra Grande Gold Mine.

In 2008, the Brazilian operations contributed 8% to the company's overall production.

== History ==
The mines have been in operation since 1725 and came under the proprietorship of the English Saint John Del Rey Mining Company in 1834. In this period the mine was amongst others instrumental in the establishment of a hydro-electrical power plant, a state of the art hospital, the Villa Nova AC association football team, which had some importance between the 1930s and 1970s and the construction of a circa 10 kilometre tramway line between Nova Lima and Raposos, considered the first in South America.

In 1915, the Morro Velho mine reached a vertical depth of 5,824 feet (1,775 m), which made it the deepest mine in the world. The miners continued going deeper, and the mine kept the title of world's deepest until 1928, when the Village Deep mine in South Africa reached a vertical depth of 8,000 feet (2,400 m), exceeding the depth of the Morro Velho, which was 7,126 feet (2,172 m) in 1929. The mine changed its ownership later on to the Carvalhaes family.

In 1975 the South Africa-based Anglo American Corporation, a precursor to today's AshantiGold, became owners of the operations. These days Morro Velhos is the world's oldest continuously worked mine. Some of the mines' works are over 3,000 meters (9,800 feet) deep underground. Although Morro Velho's main production is gold, silver, arsenic, and other minerals are also extracted at the mining complex.

Despite closing of the Minha Velha and Engenho D'Água mines in 2003 and 2004, gold production has increased over the past three years, with 240,000 ounces (6,800 kilograms) of gold produced in 2004 at an average recovered ore grade of 0.222 ounces per ton (7.62 grams per metric ton). Cash costs of production totalled $133 per ounce, with the mine realizing adjusted operating profit of $45 million.

In 2009, the mine employed close to 3,000 people, 2,250 of those being permanent staff.

== Production ==
Recent production figures of the mine were:

Year	Production (ounces)	Grade	Cost per ounce
2003	228,000	6.84 g/t	US$ 141
2004	240,000	7.85 g/t	US$133
2005	250,000	7.27 g/t	US$169
2006	242,000	7.60 g/t	US$195
2007	317,000	7.48 g/t	US$233
2008	320,000	7.62 g/t	US$300
2009	329,000	7.02 g/t	US$339
2010			

== Images ==
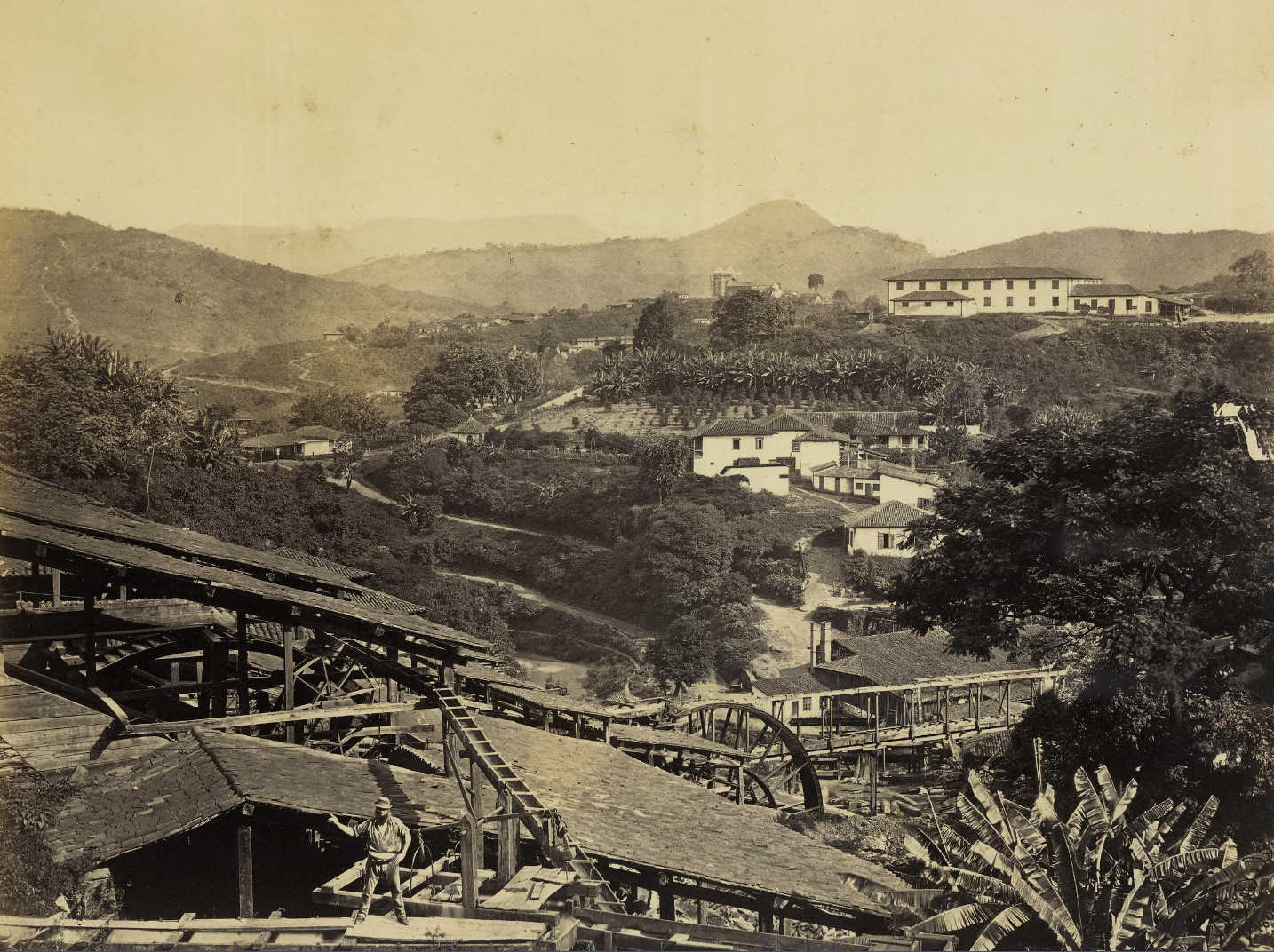
Saint John Del Rey Mining Company 1868

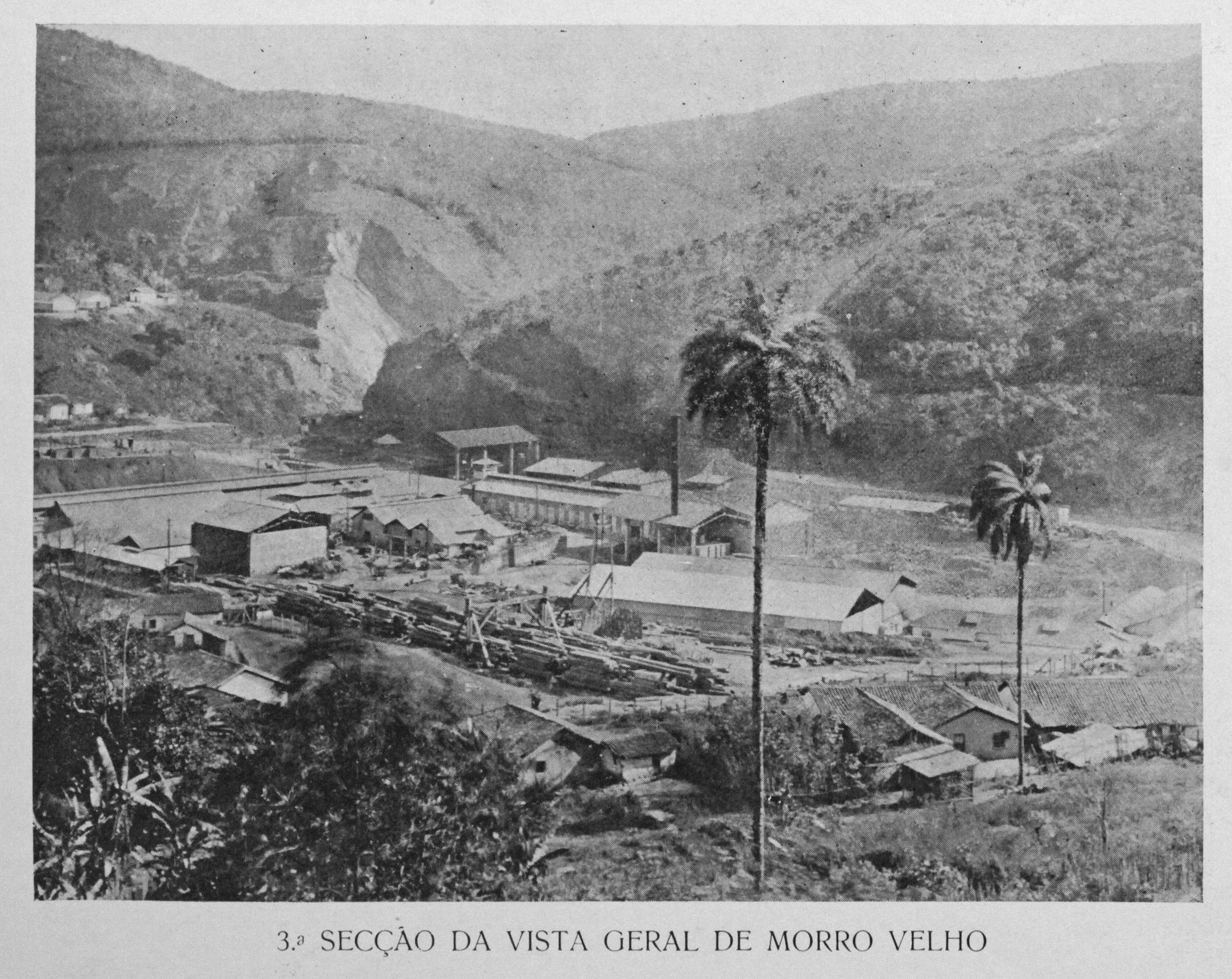
Morro Velho 1907

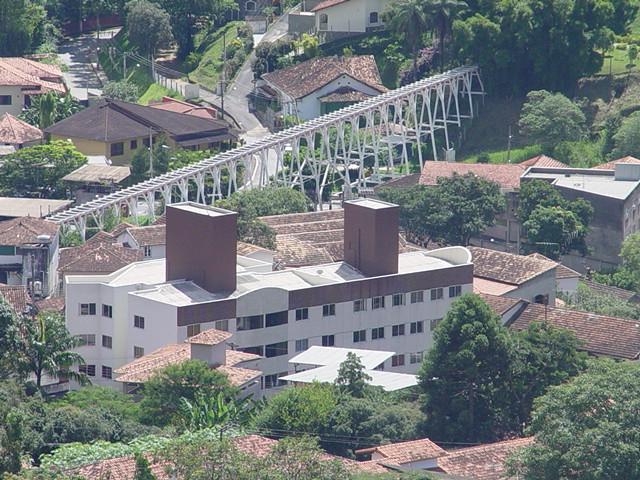
Aqueduct constructed by the English to wash gold
