= Batatais (footballer) =

Brazilian footballer (1910-1960)

Personal information
- Full name: Algisto Lorenzato
- Date of birth: May 20, 1910
- Place of birth: Batatais, Brazil
- Date of death: July 16, 1960 (aged 50)
- Place of death: Rio de Janeiro, Brazil
- Position: Goalkeeper

Senior career*
Years	Team	Apps	(Gls)
- Comercial Futebol Clube
- Portuguesa
- Palmeiras
- Fluminense
- América-RJ

International career
- Brazil
Medal record
Representing Brazil
FIFA World Cup
Third place	1938 France
- * Club domestic league appearances and goals

Algisto Lorenzato (May 20, 1910 – July 16, 1960), usually known as Batatais (after the Brazilian city where he was born), was a football (soccer) goalkeeper. He's one of the greatest players in Fluminense's history. In career, started at early 1930s at Comercial Futebol Clube of Ribeirão Preto, he played for Portuguesa, Palmeiras, Fluminense and América-RJ where close his career in 1948.

He won five Rio de Janeiro State Tournament with Fluminense in 1936, 1937, 1938, 1940 and 1941. For Brazil national football team he participated at 1938 FIFA World Cup and played two matches.

He died in Rio de Janeiro at age 50.
