= Nova Lima =

- Municipality
- Municipality of Nova Lima
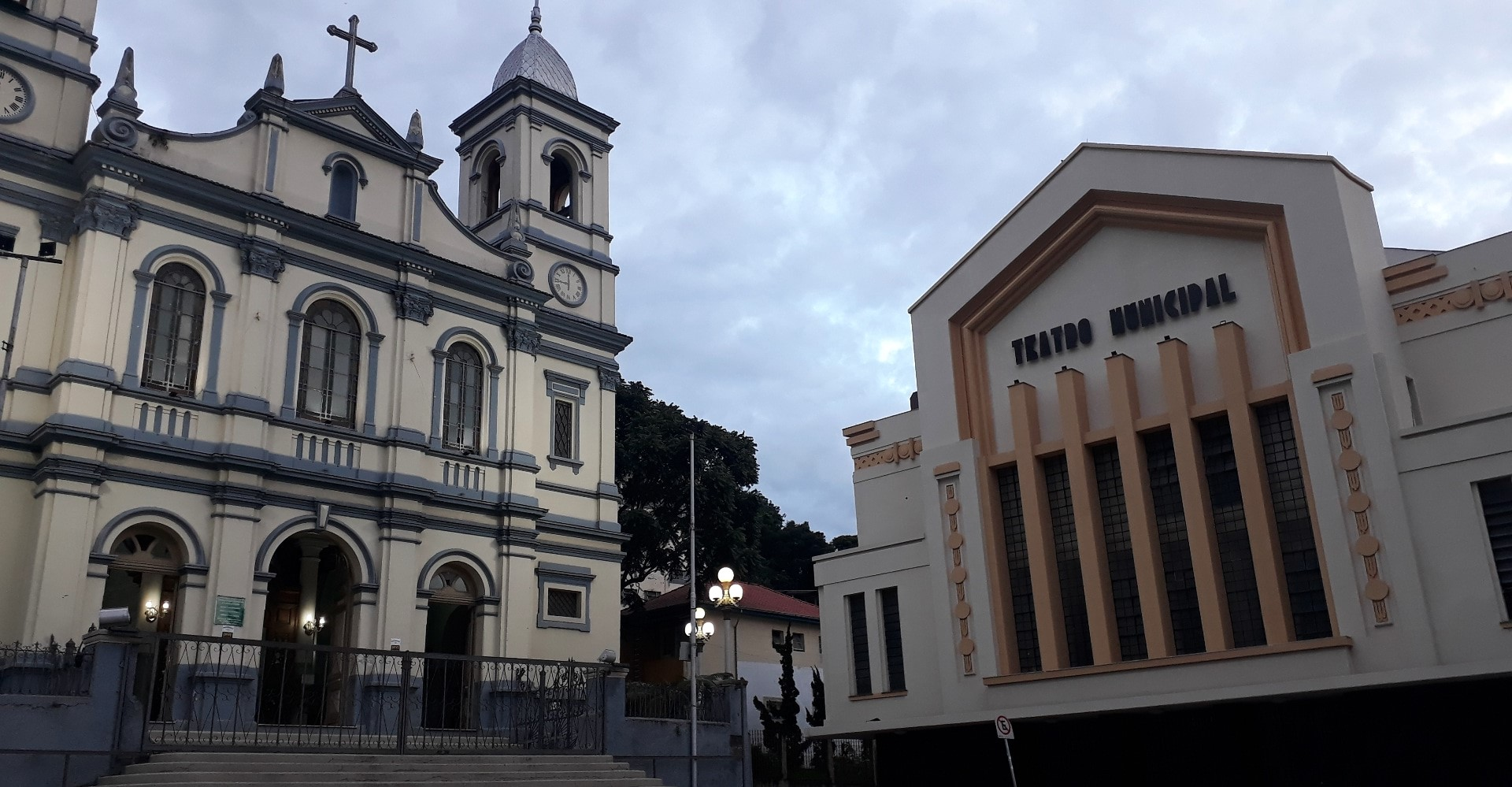
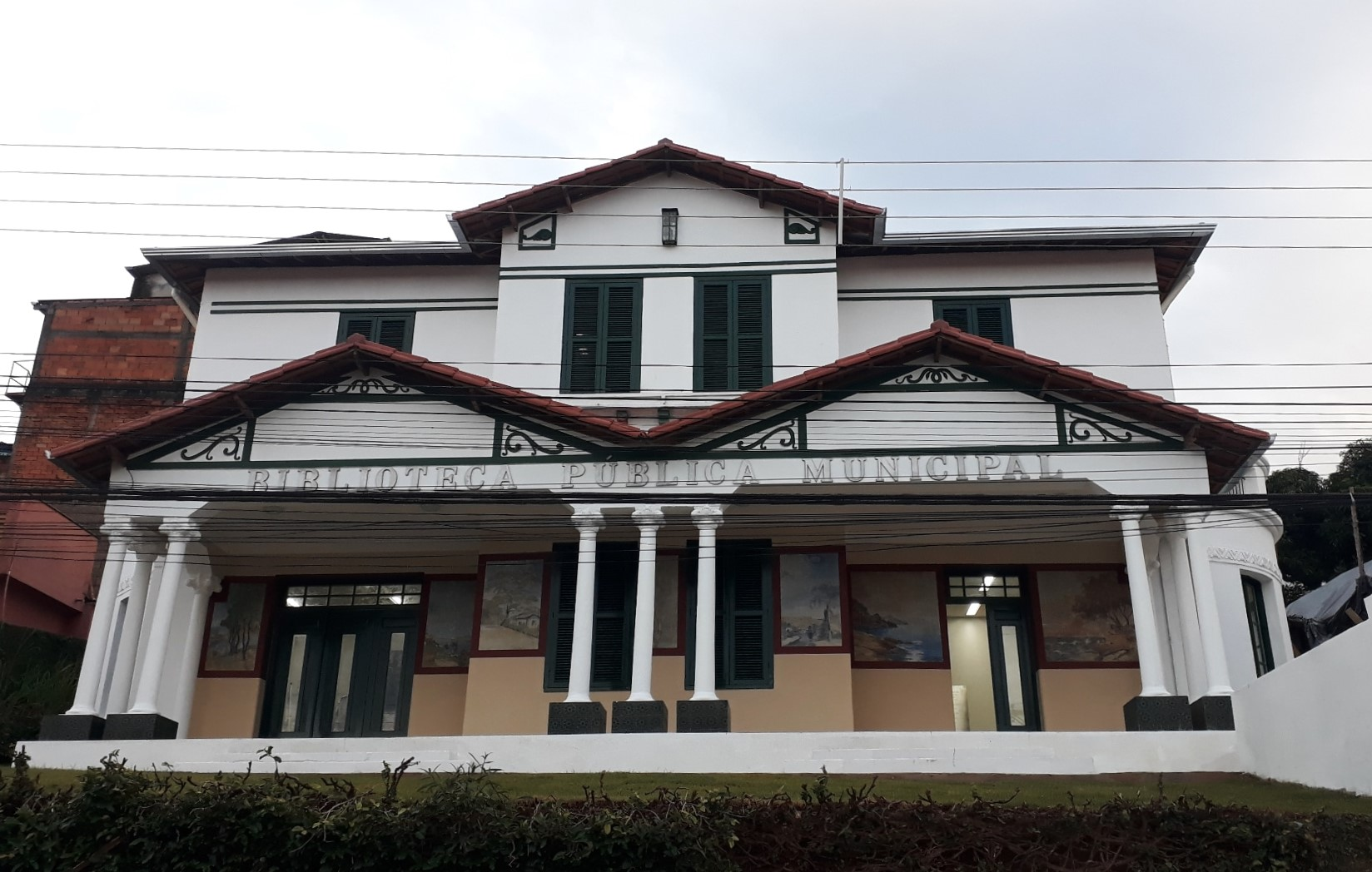
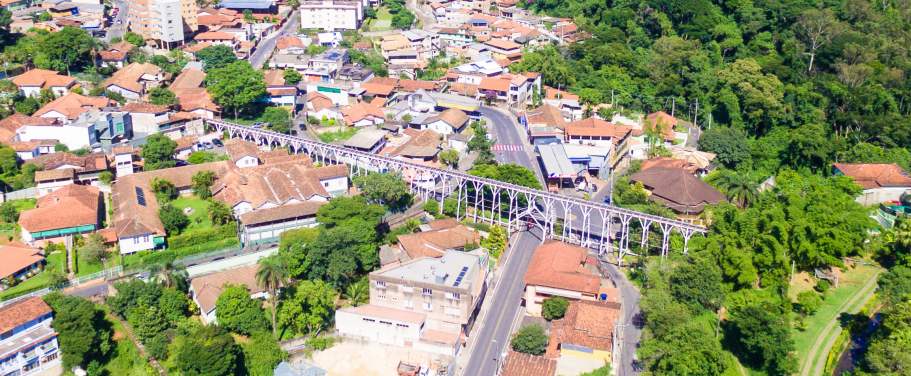
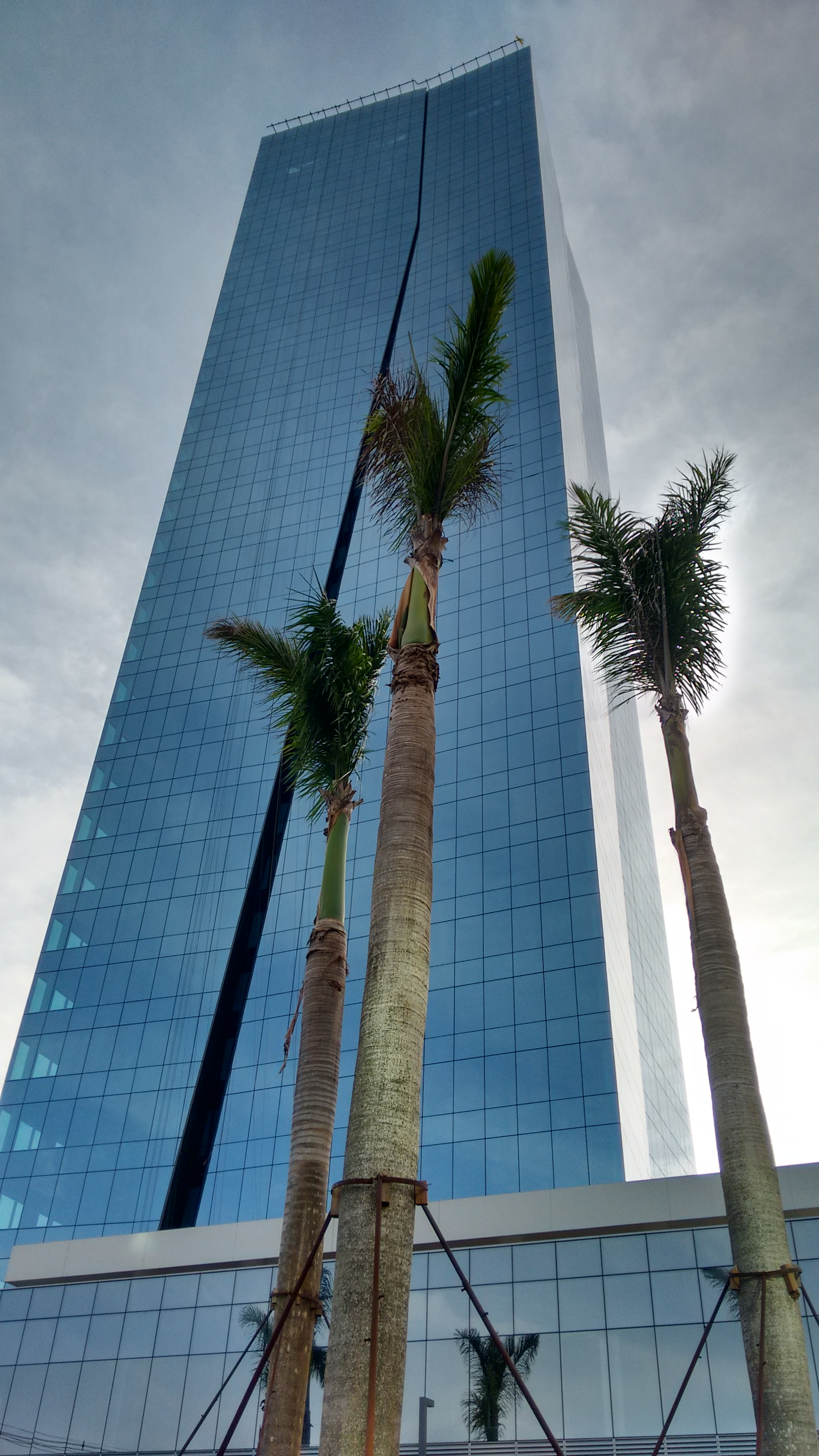
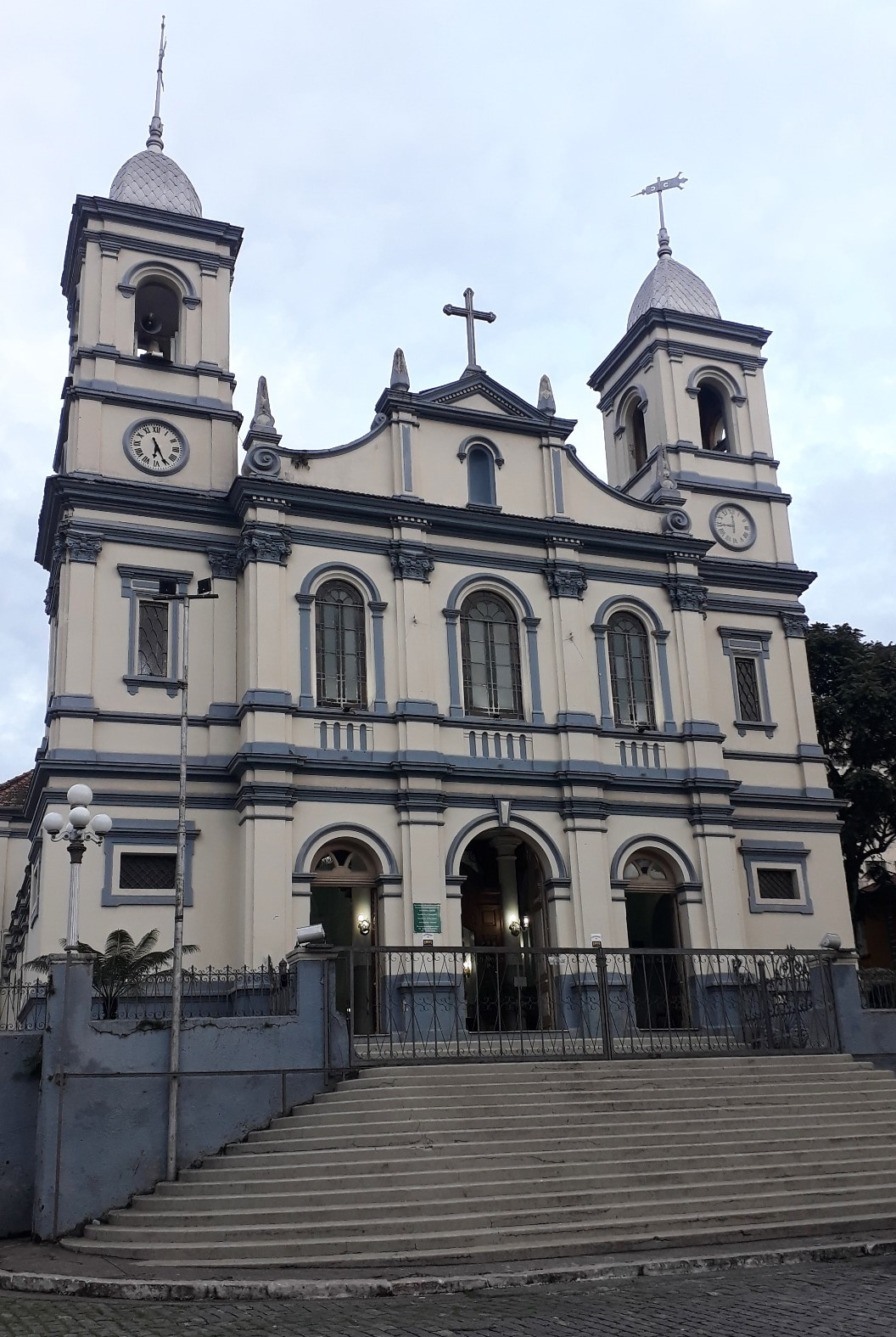
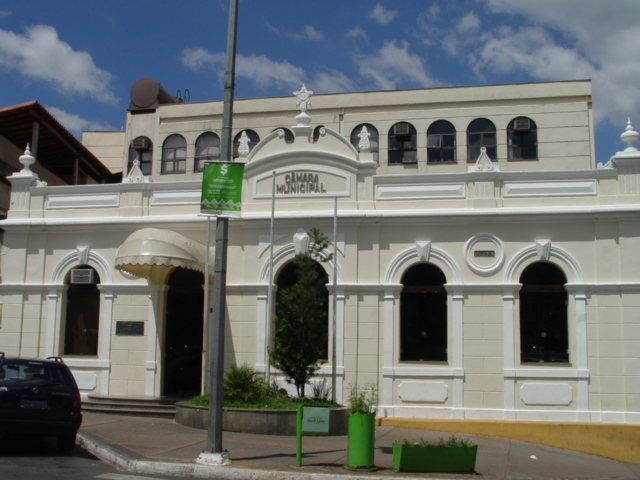
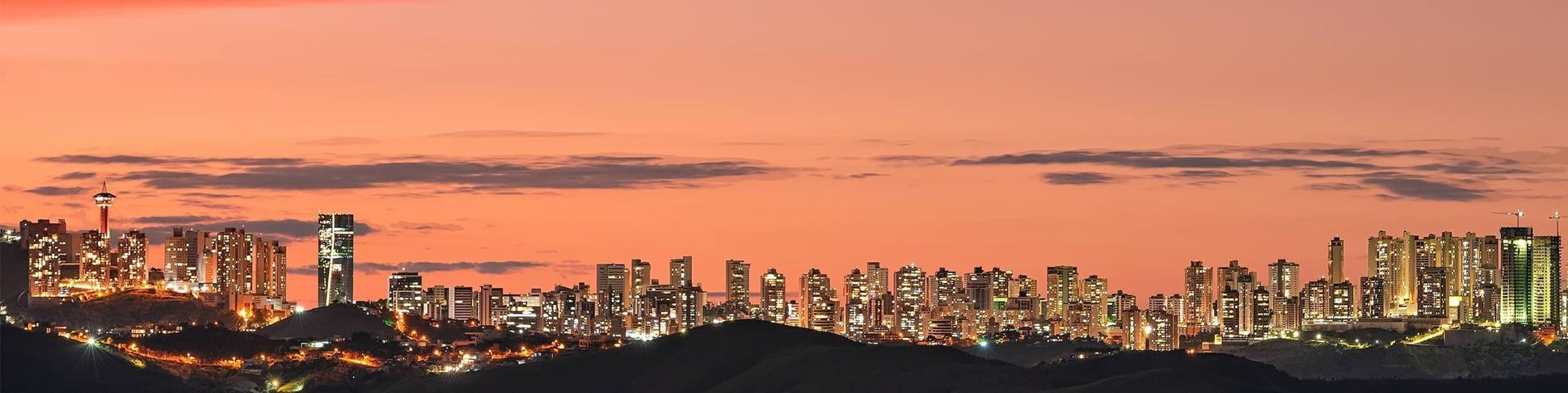

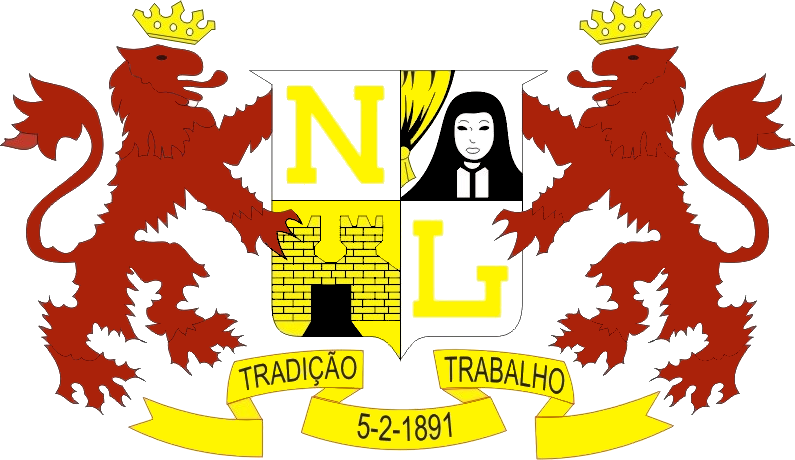
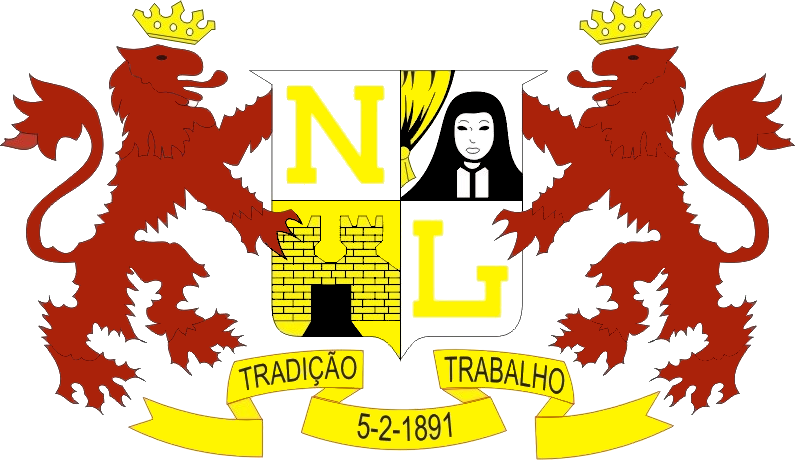
- Flag Coat of arms

- Location in Minas Gerais

- Location in Brazil
- Coordinates: 19°59′09″S 43°50′49″W
- Country: Brazil
- State: Minas Gerais
- Region: Southeast
- Intermediate Region: Belo Horizonte
- Immediate Region: Belo Horizonte
- Incorporated: February 5, 1891

Government
  - Mayor: João Marcelo Dieguez Pereira (Cidadania)

Area
  - Total: 429.313 km^{2} (165.759 sq mi)
- Elevation: 750 m (2,460 ft)

Population (2022 Census)
  - Total: 113,709
  - Estimate (2025): 120,959
  - Density: 260.18/km^{2} (673.9/sq mi)
- Time zone: UTC−3 (BRT)
- CEP: 34000-000
- Area code: 31
- HDI (2010): 0.813 – very high
- Website: www.novalima.mg.gov.br

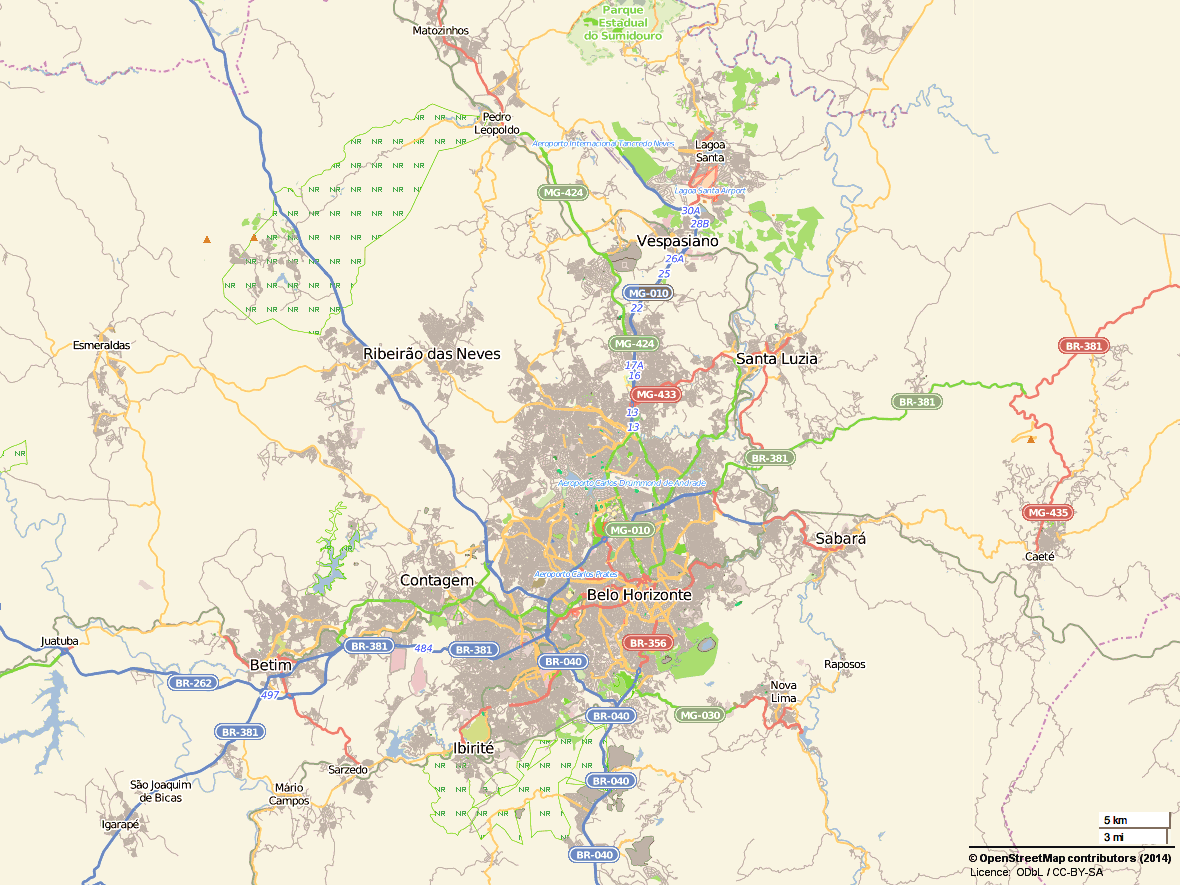
Belo Horizonte and Environs

Nova Lima is a municipality of about 121,000 people, whose downtown is located about 20 kilometers south of Belo Horizonte, the capital of the south-eastern Brazilian state of Minas Gerais. Mining is one of the main economical activities of the city, including the extraction of Iron Ore and Gold. The most famous mine in the city is Morro Velho (Old Hill), a gold mine of 2,700 metres (8,900 ft) depth.

== History ==
Historically, the city was known as Campos de Congonhas, Congonhas de Sabará and until 1923 as Villa Nova de Lima.

== Geography ==
The city belongs to the mesoregion Metropolitana de Belo Horizonte and to the microregion of Belo Horizonte.

The city is home to several mines, including the Morro Velho, Mostardas, and Rio de Peixe mines. A number of minerals are extracted from these and other sites in and around the city, including gold.

The St. John Del Rey Mining Company was founded by British interests in 1834 for the extraction of gold and also caused the settlement of some 150 families from Britain which led to the establishment of the Anglican Church in town.

The municipality contains the 912 hectares (2,250 acres) Mata do Jambreiro Private Natural Heritage Reserve, a protected area operated by the State Forestry Institute in partnership with the MBR mining company. It contains part of the 3,941 hectares (9,740 acres) Serra do Rola-Moça State Park, created in 1994. It also contains a small part of the 31,270 hectares (77,300 acres) Serra do Gandarela National Park, created in 2014.

== Sports ==
The city is home to the Villa Nova Atlético Clube, the second-oldest football club of Minas Gerais still active. The club was a major force from the 1930s until the early 1950s and won in that period five state championships. It is still a regular participant in the first division of Minas Gerais. From the late 1920s until the end of the 1930s the Sport Club Retiro also took part in the state championship. With José Perácio in 1938 and Luiz Carlos Ferreira "Luizinho" in 1982 two players born in Nova Lima represented Brazil in World Cups.

== Gallery ==
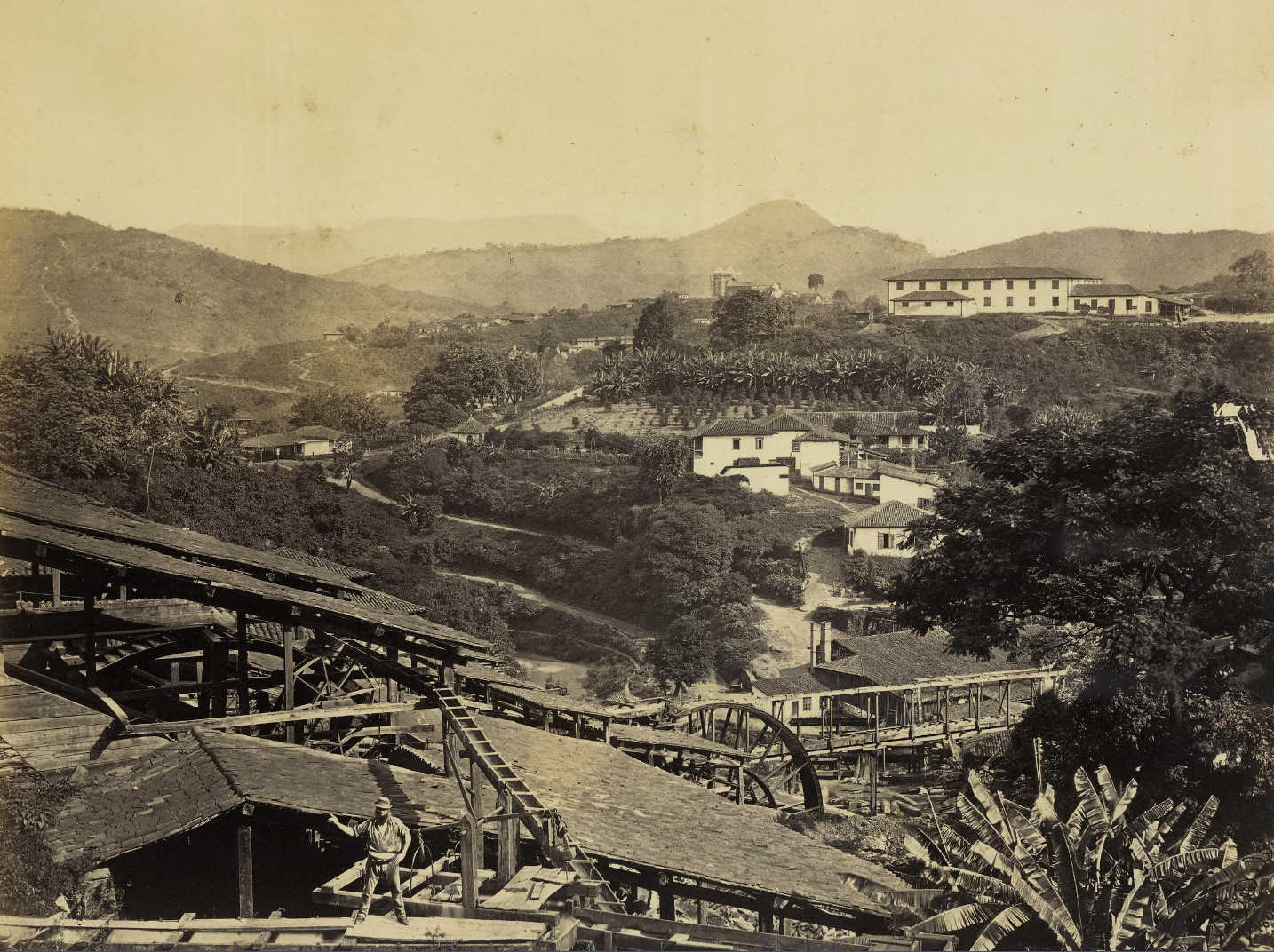
St John Del Rey Mining Co., ca. 1868–69

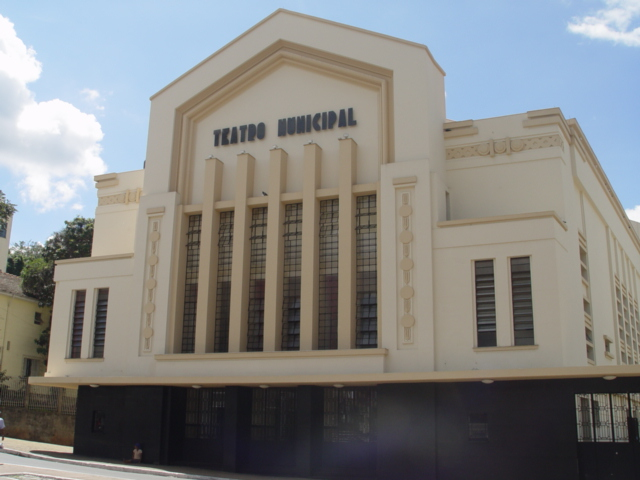
Teatro Municipal

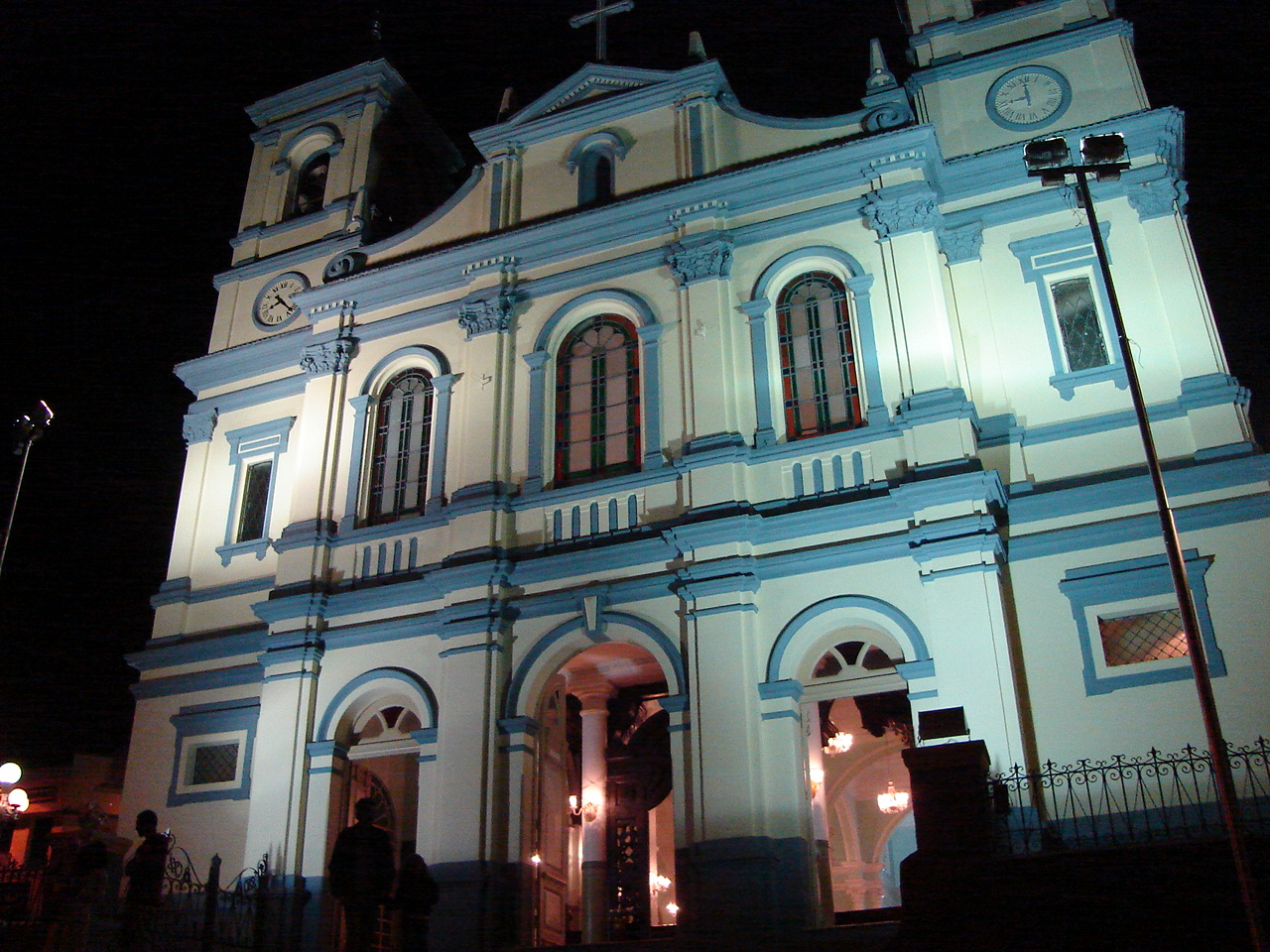
Matriz do Pilar

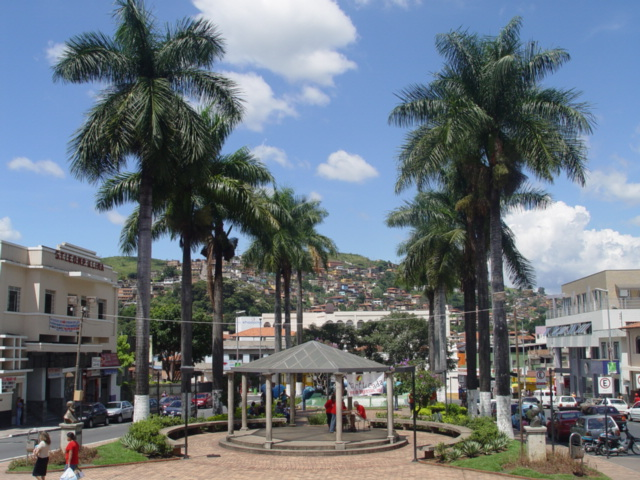
Main Square

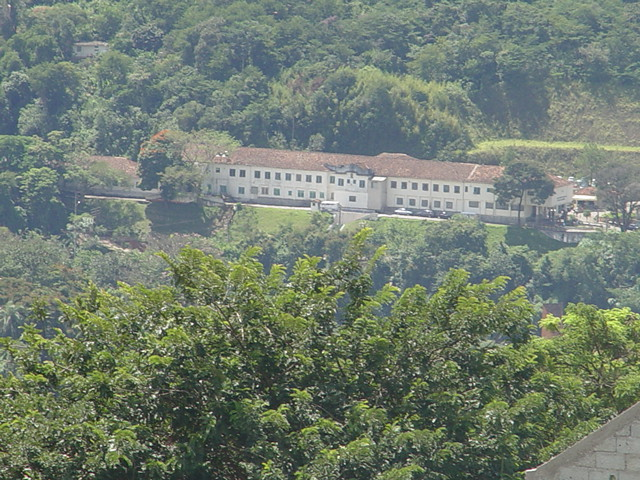
Hospital Nossa Senhora de Lourdes

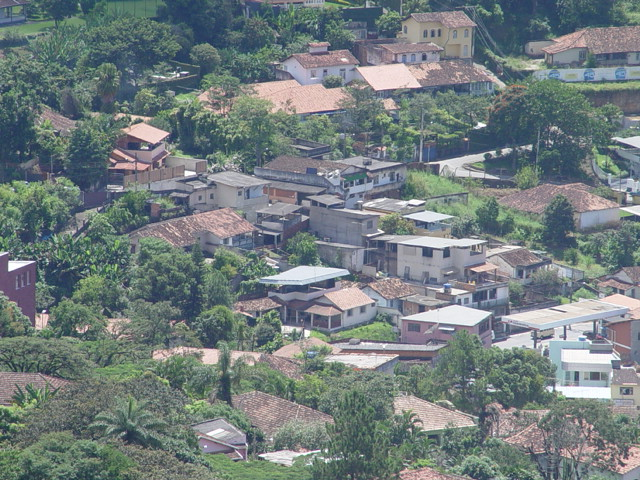
Quarter of the English

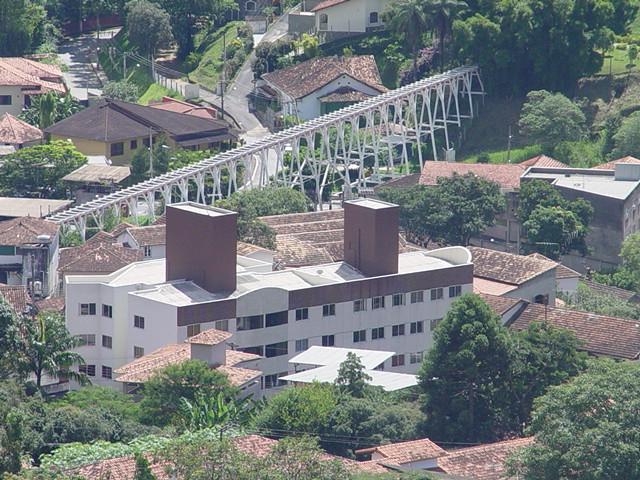
Bicame, aqueduct for gold-washing

== See also ==
- List of municipalities in Minas Gerais
