= Serra Grande Gold Mine =

Gold mine in Brazil

Serra Grande
- Location in Brazil
- Location: Crixás, Goiás, Brazil; 14°14′15.72″S 49°22′28.7″W
- Production: 154,000
- Financial year: 2009
- Opened: 1987
- Company: AngloGold Ashanti (50% - Operator); Kinross Gold Corporation (50%)
- Website: AngloGold Ashanti website Kinross Gold website

The Serra Grande Gold Mine is a gold mine located in Crixás in the Brazilian state of Goiás. The mine is jointly owned by AngloGold Ashanti and Kinross Gold Corporation, who share equal partnership. AngloGold Ashanti operates the mine, but revenue from the operation is evenly distributed between the two companies.

In 2008, the Brazilian operations, including the Serra Grande Gold Mine, contributed 8% to AngloGold Ashanti's overall gold production. This mine is one of two operations by AngloGold Ashanti in Brazil, with the other being the Brasil Mineração Gold Mine.

== History ==
Exploration work at the Serra Grande mine began in 1973, with detailed mapping and diamond drilling conducted until 1976. However, actual mining operations did not start until 1987.

In January 2003, Kinross Gold acquired a fifty percent stake in the Serra Grande mine through a merger with TVX.

Serra Grande currently comprises three underground mines: Mina III, Mina Nova, and Palmeiras, with Palmeiras being the most recent development. Additionally, there is an open pit located above Mina III.

The mine recorded one fatality in 2008 but has been fatality free in 2009.

== Production ==
Recent production figures of the mine were:

Year	Production (ounces)	Grade	Cost per ounce
2003	190,000	7.88 g/t	US$ 109
2004	188,000	7.80 g/t	US$ 134
2005	192,000	7.93 g/t	US$ 158
2006	194,000	7.51 g/t	US$ 198
2007	182,000	7.21 g/t	US$ 263
2008	174,000	7.58 g/t	US$ 294
2009	154,000	4.72 g/t	US$ 406
2010			
