= Marcelo Batatais =

Brazilian footballer (born 1974)

Personal information
- Full name: Marcelo Guioto
- Date of birth: September 9, 1974 (age 52)
- Place of birth: Batatais, São Paulo, Brazil
- Height: 1.84 m (6 ft 1/2 in)
- Position: Centre-back

Youth career
- 1988–1991: Batatais

Senior career*
Years	Team	Apps	(Gls)
1992–1993	Guarani		
1994–1995	Botafogo-SP		
1996–1998	Mogi Mirim		
1999	Botafogo-SP		
2000–2001	Mogi Mirim		
2002–2006	Cruzeiro		
2006–2007	Coritiba		
2007–2008	Vitória	6	(1)
2009–2011	São Caetano	65	(3)
- * Club domestic league appearances and goals as of October 10, 2009

Marcelo Guioto or simply Marcelo Batatais (born September 9, 1974), is a former Brazilian centre defender. Batatais was known for his incredible heading ability.

Guioto previously played for Cruzeiro and Vitória in the Campeonato Brasileiro.

== Titles ==
=== Cruzeiro ===
- Brazilian League: 2003
- Brazilian Cup: 2003
- Minas Gerais State Championship: 2002, 2003, 2004

== See also ==
- Football in Brazil
- List of football clubs in Brazil
