= Honório Serpa =

Coordinates: 26.1408°S 52.3869°W

- Municipality
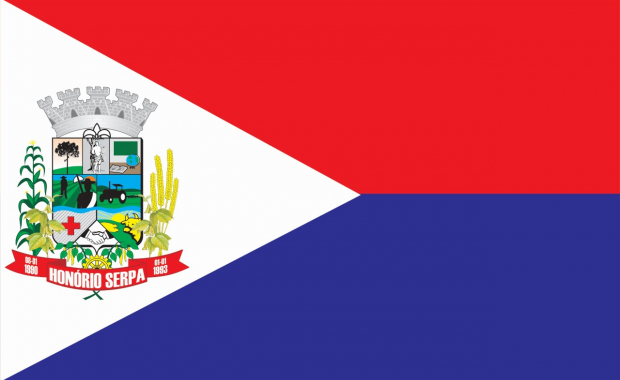
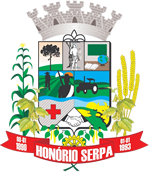
- Flag Coat of arms

- Location in Brazil
- Country: Brazil
- Region: Southern
- State: Paraná
- Mesoregion: Centro-Sul Paranaense

Population (2020)
  - Total: 5,119
- Time zone: UTC−3 (BRT)

Honório Serpa is a municipality in the state of Paraná in the Southern Region of Brazil.

== See also ==
- List of municipalities in Paraná
