= Grupo Honorio =

Group of Argentine diplomats

Grupo Honorio is a group of Argentine diplomats of the Radical Civic Union. The group has criticized the Argentine embassy in Santiago's attempt to repratriate Mapuche Indigenist activist Facundo Jones Huala who is serving a prison term in Chile. After Chilean minister Izkia Siches spoke about the Mapuche homeland "Wallmapu" in March 2022 Grupo Honorio has declared to be "worried that Chilean officials would be backing separatist aspirations, that could potentially violate the integrity of the territory of Argentina and the Boundary Treaty of 1881".
