= Deaths in December 2019 =

The following is a list of notable deaths in December 2019.

Entries for each day are listed alphabetically by surname. A typical entry lists information in the following sequence:

- Name, age, country of citizenship at birth, subsequent country of citizenship (if applicable), reason for notability, cause of death (if known), and reference.

== December 2019 ==
=== 1 ===
- Henri Biancheri, 87, French football player (Monaco, Angers) and executive (Monaco).
- Shyamal Kanti Biswas, 71, Bangladeshi academic, vice-chancellor of Chittagong University of Engineering and Technology (2007–2012).
- Noksong Boham, 71, Indian politician, MLA (1978–1980, 1984–1999), cancer.
- Miguelina Cobián, 77, Cuban sprinter, Olympic silver medalist (1968).
- Anthony Cooke, 92, British rear admiral.
- Douglas DeGood, 72, American politician.
- Bob Fairchild, 90, American politician.
- Edgardo Gomez, 81, Filipino biologist.
- David E. Harrison, 86, American politician.
- Miguel Hesayne, 96, Argentinian Roman Catholic prelate, Bishop of Viedma (1975–1995).
- Mariss Jansons, 76, Latvian conductor, heart disease.
- Jane Kister, 75, British-American mathematical logician, complications following heart surgery.
- Robert M. Koerner, 85, American engineer and academic.
- Michael Lai, 73, Hong Kong Cantopop composer (Police Story, Project A Part II, Miracles) and actor.
- Lil Bub, 8, American celebrity cat (Lil Bub & Friendz).
- Liu Gangji, 86, Chinese philosopher, aesthetician, historian, and artist.
- Shelley Morrison, 83, American actress (Will & Grace, The Flying Nun, General Hospital), heart failure.
- René Rebuffat, 89, French historian and archeologist.
- Sacred Falls, 10, New Zealand racehorse and sire, liver disease.
- Paul Sirba, 59, American Roman Catholic prelate, Bishop of Duluth (since 2009), heart attack.
- Libby Skala, 52, American actress and playwright.
- Pat Sullivan, 69, American Hall of Fame football player (Auburn Tigers, Atlanta Falcons, Washington Redskins) and coach, Heisman Trophy winner (1971), cancer.
- Paula Tilbrook, 89, English actress (Emmerdale, Last of the Summer Wine).

=== 2 ===
- George Atkinson III, 27, American football player (Oakland Raiders, Cleveland Browns).
- Nicolas Bokov, 74, Russian writer.
- Michael Brewster, 65, American politician, member of the New Hampshire House of Representatives (2014–2018)
- Jimmy Cavallo, 92, American musician, heart failure.
- Richard Easton, 86, Canadian actor (The Brothers, Henry V, Revolutionary Road), Tony winner (2001).
- D. C. Fontana, 80, American television writer (Star Trek, The Streets of San Francisco, The Waltons).
- Les Goble, 87, American football player (Chicago Cardinals).
- John F. Grady, 90, American judge.
- William D. Haseman, 71, American computer scientist.
- Francesco Janich, 82, Italian footballer (Lazio, Bologna, national team).
- Sir John Kerr, 82, British admiral, Chief of Defence Intelligence (1988–1991), Commander-in-Chief Naval Home Command (1991–1993).
- Robert K. Massie, 90, American Romanov historian, Pulitzer Prize winner (1981).
- Johann Baptist Metz, 91, German theologian.
- Jacques Morgantini, 95, French record producer and promoter.
- Carl Muller, 84, Sri Lankan poet and writer.
- Dianne H. Pilgrim, 78, American art historian.
- Alfred Reid, 81, Jamaican Anglican prelate, Bishop of Jamaica (2000–2012).
- Barry Sadler, 79, Australian rules footballer (Fitzroy).
- Mutaib bin Abdulaziz Al Saud, 88, Saudi royal, Governor of Makkah Region (1958–1961).
- Manfred Schneckenburger, 81, German art historian and curator, director of the documenta art exhibition (1977, 1987).
- Muriel Seltman, 92, British mathematician and political activist.
- Greedy Smith, 63, Australian musician (Mental As Anything), heart attack.
- Joe Smith, 91, American music industry executive (Capitol Records, Elektra Records, Warner Records).
- Fred Storey, 87, Canadian curler.
- Ken Taylor, 65, American philosopher and radio host, heart attack.
- Juan Pablo Vergara, 34, Peruvian footballer (Binacional, UTC), traffic collision.
- Francette Vernillat, 82, French actress (Thérèse Raquin).
- Bhagwati Singh Visharad, 98, Indian politician, MLA (1957–1962, 1967–1977, 1980–1989, 1991–1993).
- Vini Vitharana, 91, Sri Lankan linguist and professor.
- Zhang Zhenxian, 92, Chinese air force general, Political Commissar of the Jinan and Guangzhou Military Region Air Forces.

=== 3 ===
- John Ash, 71, British poet and writer.
- Rawshan Ara Bachchu, 86, Bangladeshi activist.
- Arthur Baysting, 72, New Zealand writer, musician, and children's advocate.
- Giovanni Bertini, 68, Italian footballer (Roma, Fiorentina, Catania), amyotrophic lateral sclerosis.
- Irmela Broniecki, 75, German Olympic fencer.
- Cha In-ha, 27, South Korean actor.
- Mary Craig, 91, British journalist and writer.
- André Daguin, 84, French chef, cancer.
- Jean Deloche, 90, French historian.
- Johann Eyfells, 96, Icelandic artist.
- Fang Zengxian, 88, Chinese painter, Director of the Shanghai Art Museum, founder of the Shanghai Biennale.
- Firoz Ghanty, 67, Mauritian painter, poet, and activist.
- Andrew Gissinger, 60, American football player & CEO.
- Paula Grimaldi-Reardon, 65, American photographer.
- Carl O. Helvie, 87, American nurse and nursing theorist.
- Nosrat Karimi, 94, Iranian actor and filmmaker.
- Ray Kidder, 96, American physicist.
- Thomas Demetrios Lambros, 89, American judge.
- James Francis McAlpine, 97, Canadian entomologist.
- Shaaban Abdel Rahim, 62, Egyptian shaabi singer, heart failure.
- R. Ramanathan, 71, Indian politician, MLA (1985–1991), cardiac arrest.
- Patsy Rippy, 71, American tennis player.
- Donald Tosh, 84, British screenwriter (Doctor Who).
- Ragnar Ulstein, 99, Norwegian journalist and resistance fighter.
- Andrew Weiner, 70, Canadian science fiction author.

=== 4 ===
- Javier Aguirre, 84, Spanish film director (Count Dracula's Great Love).
- Cas Banaszek, 74, American football player (San Francisco 49ers).
- David John Candlin, 92, British physicist.
- Chen Xingbi, 88, Chinese electronics engineer, inventor of the superjunction power semiconductor device.
- Thomas Elsaesser, 76, German film historian.
- Leonard Goldberg, 85, American film and television producer (Charlie's Angels, Blue Bloods, WarGames), president of 20th Century Fox (1987–1989), injuries from a fall.
- Julius Gould, 95, British sociologist.
- Lucien Guillier, 92, French Olympic discus thrower and shot putter.
- Akira Hayami, 90, Japanese economist, pneumonia.
- Azucena Hernández, 59, Spanish actress (El Retorno del Hombre Lobo).
- Helen Kimble, 94, British Africanist.
- Ján Eugen Kočiš, 93, Slovak-born Czech Ruthenian Greek Catholic hierarch, Auxiliary Bishop of Apostolic Exarchate of Czech Republic (2004–2006).
- Charles Daniel Marivate, 95, South African physician.
- Sheila Mercier, 100, English actress (Emmerdale).
- Rosa Morena, 78, Spanish flamenco pop singer and actress, cancer.
- Margaret Morgan Lawrence, 105, American psychiatrist and psychoanalyst.
- Tetsu Nakamura, 73, Japanese physician, shot.
- Ockie Oosthuizen, 64, South African rugby union player (national team), cancer.
- Patrick Pym, 83, British Olympic sailor (1972).
- Claudio Rodríguez, 86, Spanish voice actor.
- C. O. Simpkins, 94, American dentist, civil rights activist, and politician, member of the Louisiana House of Representatives (1992–1996).
- Michel Verhoeve, 80, French Olympic footballer (1968).
- Peter van Walsum, 85, Dutch diplomat.
- Bob Willis, 70, English cricketer (Surrey, Warwickshire, national team), prostate cancer.
- Ranjith de Zoysa, 57, Sri Lankan politician, MP (since 2010).

=== 5 ===
- Pietro Brollo, 86, Italian Roman Catholic prelate, Bishop of Belluno-Feltre (1996–2000) and Archbishop of Udine (2000–2009).
- Rick Bryant, 71, New Zealand blues and rock musician (Rick Bryant and the Jive Bombers, The Windy City Strugglers).
- Faure Chomón, 90, Cuban guerrillero (Directorio Revolucionario Estudiantil, 26th of July Movement), diplomat and politician, MP (since 1976).
- Leon Cole, 79, Canadian musician and radio presenter.
- Jon Comer, 43, American skateboarder, kidney and liver failure.
- André Deryckere, 91, Belgian Olympic sailor.
- Gérard Detourbet, 73, French automotive executive and engineer (Renault), cancer.
- Lidija Franklin, 102, American dancer and teacher.
- Gao Yubao, 92, Chinese writer.
- Marvin Goodfriend, 69, American economist.
- Sherman Howard, 95, American football player (Cleveland Browns).
- Don Howell, 84, Australian footballer (St Kilda, Collingwood).
- Ji Zhe, 33, Chinese basketball player (Beijing Ducks), lung cancer.
- Mors Kochanski, 79, Polish-Canadian wilderness survival instructor and writer.
- George Laurer, 94, American inventor (Universal Product Code).
- Alan McAsey, 82, Australian rules footballer (Footscray).
- Jerry Naylor, 80, American musician (The Crickets).
- Bruno Scipioni, 85, Italian actor (La ragazza di Bube, Love Italian Style, The Pizza Triangle).
- James C. Tanner, 93, American journalist (The Wall Street Journal).
- Natalie Trundy, 79, American actress (The Careless Years, Mr. Hobbs Takes a Vacation, Conquest of the Planet of the Apes).
- Robert Walker Jr., 79, American actor (Ensign Pulver, The Ceremony, Star Trek).
- Robin Welch, 83, English potter.
- Mel Zabarsky, 87, American painter.

=== 6 ===
- Yevda Abramov, 71, Azerbaijani politician, Deputy (since 2005).
- V. Balasundaram, 77, Indian politician, Mayor of Chennai (1969–1970).
- Janusz Dzięcioł, 65, Polish reality show winner (Big Brother) and politician, MP (2007–2015), traffic collision.
- Eric Gardow, 51, American basketball coach.
- John L. Harmer, 85, American politician and writer, member of the California State Senate (1966–1974) and Lieutenant Governor of California (1974–1975).
- Joan Hawes, 86, English cricketer.
- Iqbal Hossain, 69, Bangladeshi politician, MP (1988–1990).
- Piet Huyg, 68, Dutch footballer (HFC Haarlem).
- Mahfuzur Rahman Khan, 70, Bangladeshi cinematographer (Srabon Megher Din, Dui Duari, Hajar Bachhor Dhore).
- Irena Laskowska, 94, Polish actress (The Last Day of Summer, Salto, Everything for Sale).
- Ron Leibman, 82, American actor (Angels in America, Norma Rae, Kaz), Tony winner (1993), complications from pneumonia.
- Kimmi Lewis, 62, American politician, member of the Colorado House of Representatives (since 2017), breast cancer.
- Lu Shixin, 89, Chinese cancer pathologist, member of the Chinese Academy of Sciences.
- Donald B. Marron Sr., 85, American financier, heart attack.
- Maurice Mounsdon, 101, British WWII RAF pilot.
- Stoyanka Mutafova, 97, Bulgarian actress (The Tied Up Balloon, Toplo, Whale).
- Michael Peacock, 90, British television executive, cancer.
- Mario Sossi, 87, Italian magistrate and politician.
- Brian Sparrow, 57, English footballer (Crystal Palace).
- Jo Ann Washam, 69, American golfer.
- Wei Xinghua, 94, Chinese economist.

=== 7 ===
- Gerald Barrax, 86, American poet and professor (North Carolina State University), traffic collision.
- Berkley Bedell, 98, American politician and businessman, member of the U.S. House of Representatives (1975–1987) and founder of Berkley, complications from a stroke.
- Norman Berson, 93, American politician, member of the Pennsylvania House of Representatives (1967–1982).
- Reinhard Bonnke, 79, German Pentecostal evangelist.
- Lisa de Cazotte, 58, American soap opera producer (Sunset Beach, The Young and the Restless, Days of Our Lives).
- Denise D'Ascenzo, 61, American news anchor (WFSB), heart attack.
- Charles Koffi Diby, 62, Ivorian politician.
- Bump Elliott, 94, American Hall of Fame college football player (Purdue Boilermakers), coach (Michigan Wolverines, Iowa Hawkeyes) and administrator.
- Kate Figes, 62, English author, cancer.
- Giuseppe Frigo, 84, Italian jurist, Magistrate of the Constitutional Court (2008–2016).
- Max van Gelder, 95, Dutch Olympic water polo player (1952), and European Champion (1950).
- Herbert Joos, 79, German jazz trumpeter.
- Jerry Jumonville, 78, American saxophonist and arranger.
- Charlie Kempinska, 81, American football player.
- Philip King, 94, American historian.
- Denis Lalanne, 93, French sports journalist.
- Bertrand Landrieu, 74, French politician and prefect.
- Joe McQueen, 100, American jazz saxophonist.
- Georges Mouly, 88, French politician, Mayor of Tulle (1974–1977) and Saint-Priest-de-Gimel (1989–2001).
- Ali Mufuruki, 60, Tanzanian businessman, Chairman of Vodacom Tanzania (since 2017).
- Walter Pauk, 105, American educationist and author (Cornell Notes).
- Ron Saunders, 87, English football player (Portsmouth) and manager (Aston Villa, Birmingham City).
- Simon Streatfeild, 90, British-Canadian conductor and violist.
- Zaza Urushadze, 53, Georgian film director (Tangerines), heart attack.
- Samuel Vigil, 90, American politician.
- Wolfgang Winkler, 76, German actor (The Rabbit Is Me, Das Mädchen auf dem Brett, I Was Nineteen).

=== 8 ===
- Suresh Gundu Amonkar, 84, Indian educationist.
- René Auberjonois, 79, American actor (Star Trek: Deep Space Nine, M*A*S*H, Benson), Tony winner (1970), assisted suicide.
- Weldon Bowlin, 78, American baseball player (Kansas City Athletics).
- Anna Bravo, 81, Italian social and feminism historian.
- Roy Cheetham, 79, English footballer (Manchester City).
- Doyle Corman, 87, American politician, member of the Pennsylvania Senate (1978–1998).
- Lorraine Granado, 71, American activist.
- Paddy Guinane, 80, Australian footballer (Richmond).
- Wilhelm Helms, 95, German politician, MP, 1969–1972, MEP (1979–1984).
- Bill Hutchins, 88, American politician.
- Juice Wrld, 21, American rapper ("All Girls Are the Same", "Lucid Dreams", "Bandit"), drug overdose.
- Hirokazu Kanazawa, 88, Japanese karateka and teacher.
- Jerry Karr, 83, American politician, member of the Kansas Senate (1981–1999).
- Dick Kraus, 82, American politician, member of the Massachusetts Senate (1983–1991), Parkinson's disease.
- Bhagabat Prasad Mohanty, 90, Indian politician, MLA (1971–1974, 1985–1990, 1995–2000).
- Coy Payne, 90, American politician.
- David Pimentel, 94, American entomologist.
- Rogério Pipi, 97, Portuguese footballer (Benfica, Botafogo, national team).
- Herbert Pundik, 92, Danish-Israeli journalist.
- Caroll Spinney, 85, American puppeteer (Sesame Street), cartoonist and author.
- Tessa Temata, 52, New Zealand diplomat, High Commissioner to the Cook Islands (since 2019).
- Paul Volcker, 92, American economist, Chair of the Federal Reserve (1979–1987).
- Zvonimir Vujin, 76, Serbian-Yugoslavian Olympic bronze medallist amateur boxer (1968, 1972).

=== 9 ===
- Tom Adams, 93, American-born Scottish illustrator.
- John Broxson, 87, American politician, member of the Florida Senate (1967–1971).
- Mary Clutter, 89, American plant biologist.
- Francisco Estrada, 71, Mexican baseball player and manager (New York Mets, Mexican League).
- Pete Frates, 34, American baseball player (Boston College Eagles) and ALS activist, co-founder of the Ice Bucket Challenge, complications from amyotrophic lateral sclerosis.
- Marie Fredriksson, 61, Swedish singer-songwriter (Roxette) and musician, complications from a brain tumour.
- Omar Graffigna, 93, Argentine Air Force officer, convicted criminal and military junta member.
- Leon Hardeman, 87, American football player (Georgia Tech Yellow Jackets).
- Chuck Heberling, 94, American basketball and football referee (NFL) and administrator, director of the Western Pennsylvania Interscholastic Athletic League (1976–1997).
- Masashi Ishibashi, 95, Japanese politician.
- Kim Woo-choong, 82, South Korean businessman, founder of Daewoo, pneumonia.
- William Luce, 88, American playwright (The Belle of Amherst, Barrymore).
- June Nash, 92, American anthropologist.
- Pedro Nikken, 74, Venezuelan lawyer and jurist, president of the Inter-American Court of Human Rights (1983–1986).
- Patrice Ordas, 68, French writer.
- Miko Palanca, 41, Filipino actor (Tabing Ilog, Panday, Palos), suicide by jumping.
- Rosselle Pekelis, 81, American judge (Washington Supreme Court), brain cancer.
- Colin James Pennycuick, 86, British zoologist.
- Detlef Pirsig, 74, German football player and manager (MSV Duisburg).
- Veijo Puhjo, 71, Finnish politician, MP (1995–2011).
- José Mauro Ramalho, 94, Brazilian Roman Catholic prelate, Bishop of Iguatu (1962–2000).
- Zoran Rankić, 84, Serbian actor.
- Ajoy Roy, 84, Bangladeshi physicist and human rights activist.
- Michael H. Shaw, 95, American politician.
- Gandharv Singh, 87, Indian politician, MLA (1990–1993).
- May Stevens, 95, American artist and political activist.
- Elizabeth Sutherland, 24th Countess of Sutherland, 98, Scottish noblewoman, chief of Clan Sutherland.
- Ben Turok, 92, South African anti-apartheid activist and politician, member of the National Assembly.
- Imre Varga, 96, Hungarian sculptor and painter.

=== 10 ===
- Md. Abdul Kadir, Bangladeshi politician.
- Albert Bertelsen, 98, Danish painter.
- Rajen Borthakur, 54, Indian politician, MLA (since 2019), kidney disease.
- Frederick B. Dent, 97, American businessman, Secretary of Commerce (1973–1975).
- Natalie Harrowell, 29, English rugby league player (Featherstone Rovers, national team).
- Kelo Henderson, 96, American actor (26 Men, The Pyramid of the Sun God, The Treasure of the Aztecs).
- Ken Heyman, 89, American photographer.
- Barrie Keeffe, 74, English screenwriter (The Long Good Friday).
- Gershon Kingsley, 97, German-American composer and electronic musician ("Popcorn").
- Yury Luzhkov, 83, Russian politician, Mayor of Moscow (1992–2010), complications during heart surgery.
- Emily Mason, 87, American painter.
- Paul Anthony McDermott, 47, Irish prosecutor.
- Philip McKeon, 55, American actor (Alice).
- Lawrence Middleton, 89, British diplomat, Ambassador to South Korea (1986–1990).
- Thabiso Mokhosi, 51, South African army chief (since 2019).
- Notnowcato, 17, British Thoroughbred racehorse, heart attack. (death announced on this date)
- Jean Pagé, 73, Canadian sportscaster and journalist (La Soirée du hockey), complications from prostate cancer.
- John A. Schneider, 94, American television executive (CBS Television Network).
- Adam Słodowy, 96, Polish investor and television host.
- Jim Smith, 79, English football player (Boston United) and manager (Portsmouth, Derby County).
- Randy Suess, 74, American computer programmer.
- Ashok Kalyanrao Tapkir, 70, Indian politician, MLA (1985–1990).
- Lily Thomas, 92, Indian constitutional lawyer.
- Scott Timberg, 50, American journalist and culture writer (Los Angeles Times, Salon, The Hollywood Reporter), suicide.
- Fabio Vásquez Castaño, 79, Colombian rebel, co-founder of National Liberation Army.
- Bill Welsh, 95, Australian footballer (Collingwood).

=== 11 ===
- David Bellamy, 86, English naturalist (Bellamy's Backyard Safari) and author.
- Carroll Parrott Blue, 76, American filmmaker.
- Bob Burnside, 87, American lifeguard.
- Paul Crossley, 74, British art historian.
- Takeo Daigo, 81, Japanese baseball player (Orions), acute myeloid leukemia.
- Nicole de Buron, 90, French writer.
- Sir John Graham, 4th Baronet, 93, British diplomat, ambassador to Iraq (1974–1977), Iran (1979–1980) and NATO (1982–1986).
- Larry Heinemann, 75, American writer.
- Jiří Jirmal, 94, Czech classical guitarist.
- Charles Knox, 90, American composer and music educator.
- Guy Laporte, 71, French actor (French Fried Vacation, French Fried Vacation 2), Charcot–Marie–Tooth disease.
- Ted Lepcio, 90, American baseball player (Boston Red Sox).
- Mike Lindsay, 81, British Olympic track and field athlete (1960, 1964).
- Tessa Majors, 18, American student, stabbed.
- Anna Manel·la, 69, Spanish sculptor.
- James McCarthy, 75, American oceanographer.
- William S. McFeely, 89, American historian, Pulitzer Prize recipient (1982), idiopathic pulmonary fibrosis.
- N. S. Rajaram, 76, Indian historian.
- Al Reynolds, 81, American football player (Dallas Texans/Kansas City Chiefs).
- Henry Ssentongo, 83, Ugandan Roman Catholic prelate, Bishop of Moroto (1992–2014).
- Hannah Steinberg, 93, Austrian-born British psychopharmacologist.
- Albert Toro, Papua New Guinean actor, director and politician, member of the Bougainville House of Representatives (since 2018).
- Martin Warnke, 82, German art historian, Gottfried Wilhelm Leibniz Prize winner (1990).
- Ann Elizabeth Wee, 93, British-born Singaporean social worker.
- Ian Young, 76, Scottish footballer (Celtic, St Mirren).

=== 12 ===
- Danny Aiello, 86, American actor (Do the Right Thing, The Godfather Part II, Moonstruck).
- Dalton Baldwin, 87, American pianist.
- Butch Barber, 76, Canadian ice hockey player (Chicago Cougars).
- Jean Bazin, 79, Canadian lawyer and politician.
- Sir Alasdair Breckenridge, 82, Scottish pharmacologist.
- Phil Brigandi, 60, American independent scholar, complications from a heart attack.
- James Moore Goode, 80, American historian.
- Jorge Hernández, 65, Cuban light flyweight boxer, Olympic champion (1976).
- Hoddy Hildreth, 97, American politician.
- Vaughan Johnson, 57, American football player (Jacksonville Bulls, New Orleans Saints, Philadelphia Eagles), kidney disease.
- Norman Kingsbury, 87, New Zealand educational administrator, University of Waikato registrar (1964–1988), New Zealand Qualifications Authority CEO (1990–2000).
- David H. Locke, 92, American lawyer and politician, minority leader of the Massachusetts Senate.
- Roger Midgley, 95, British field hockey player, Olympic bronze medalist (1952).
- Brian Muller, 77, New Zealand rugby union player (Taranaki, national team).
- Philip Osondu, 48, Nigerian footballer (R.S.C. Anderlecht).
- Steven Ozment, 80, American historian.
- Phase 2, 64, American graffiti artist, complications from amyotrophic lateral sclerosis.
- Gollapudi Maruti Rao, 80, Indian actor (Samsaram Oka Chadarangam, Yamudiki Mogudu, Aditya 369) and screenwriter.
- Željko Rohatinski, 68, Croatian economist.
- Jack Scott, 83, Canadian-American rock singer and songwriter ("My True Love", "Burning Bridges").
- Gunnar Smoliansky, 86, Swedish photographer.
- Sir Peter Snell, 80, New Zealand middle-distance runner, Olympic champion (1960, 1964).
- Stig Sollander, 93, Swedish alpine skier, Olympic bronze medalist (1956).
- Tatsuo Umemiya, 81, Japanese actor (Abashiri Prison, Battles Without Honor and Humanity, Cops vs. Thugs), kidney failure.
- Charles Van Antwerpen, 94, Belgian Olympic rower.

=== 13 ===
- Gerd Baltus, 87, German actor (The Blood of the Walsungs, I Am Looking for a Man, Derrick).
- Lawrence Bittaker, 79, American serial killer.
- Jean-Claude Carle, 71, French politician, Senator (1995–2018).
- Graham Cooper, 81, Australian football player (Hawthorn).
- Ekaterina Durova, 60, Russian actress (School Waltz, The Admirer, Yuri's Day).
- Bram Gay, 89, Welsh trumpeter and brass band musician.
- Richard G. Hatcher, 86, American politician, Mayor of Gary, Indiana (1968–1988) and Vice-Chairman of the Democratic National Committee (1981–1985).
- Christopher Jackson, 84, British businessman and politician, MEP (1979–1994).
- Roy Johnston, 90, Irish physicist and political activist.
- Roy Loney, 73, American rock singer (Flamin' Groovies).
- Robert Lucas, 97, French Olympic field hockey player.
- Ushiomaru Motoyasu, 41, Japanese rikishi, angiosarcoma.
- Wolfgang Nastainczyk, 87, German theologian.
- Benur Pashayan, 60, Armenian Greco-Roman wrestler, world champion (1982, 1983).
- Rosa Porto, 89, Cuban-American baker and businesswoman.
- Emil Richards, 87, American percussionist.
- Joey Sandulo, 88, Canadian Olympic boxer (1948).
- Carl Scheer, 82, American basketball executive, general manager of the Denver Nuggets (1974–1984) and the Charlotte Hornets (1987–1990).
- Sheldon Songstad, 81, American politician.
- Rashied Staggie, South African gangster, shot.
- Alfons Sweeck, 83, Belgian racing cyclist.
- Yasuhiro Takai, 74, Japanese baseball player (Hankyu Braves), renal failure.
- Gudrun Zapf von Hesse, 101, German typographer, calligrapher and book-binder.

=== 14 ===
- Yuri Belyayev, 85, Russian footballer (CSKA Moscow, national team), Olympic champion (1956).
- Michèle Bernard-Requin, 76, French lawyer and magistrate, cancer.
- Chuy Bravo, 63, Mexican-born American actor and television personality (Chelsea Lately, After Lately), heart attack.
- John Briley, 94, American screenwriter (Gandhi, Cry Freedom, Marie), Oscar winner (1983).
- Dmitri Chesnokov, 46, Russian footballer (FC Saturn Ramenskoye, FC Vityaz Podolsk).
- Jack B. Farris, 84, American military officer, commander of ground forces during Operation Urgent Fury.
- André Gaumond, 83, Canadian Roman Catholic prelate, Archbishop of Sherbrooke (1996–2011).
- Rosalee Glass, 102, Polish-born American businesswoman and Holocaust survivor, injuries sustained in a fall.
- Warren A. Grady, 95, American politician, member (1953–1961) and majority leader (1957) of the Wisconsin State Assembly.
- Lord Tim Hudson, 79, English DJ, voice actor (The Jungle Book), and agent (Ian Botham).
- Michael Karkoc, 100, Ukrainian military officer.
- Anna Karina, 79, Danish-born French actress (My Life to Live, A Woman Is a Woman, Alphaville), cancer.
- A. K. M. Sirazul Islam Khan, 76, Bangladeshi academic, vice-chancellor of Jagannath University (2006–2008).
- Koo Cha-kyung, 94, South Korean business executive, chairman of LG Group (1970–1995).
- Stuart J. Knickerbocker, 94, American cartoonist and animator.
- Bernard Lavalette, 93, French actor (Thomas the Impostor, Le gendarme se marie, The Apprentice Heel).
- Meng Zhizhong, 84, Chinese satellite engineer, chief designer of the Fengyun-1 and -3.
- Moondog Rex, 69, American professional wrestler (WWF).
- Garry Ord, 88, Australian radio and television presenter.
- Panamarenko, 79, Belgian sculptor.
- Pamela Payton-Wright, 78, American actress.
- Billie Rattigan, 87, Irish Gaelic footballer (Dunshaughlin, Meath).
- Felix Rohatyn, 91, Austrian-born American banker and diplomat, Ambassador to France (1997–2000).
- Gita Siddharth, Indian actress (Parichay, Garm Hava).
- Jerome L. Singer, 95, American psychologist.
- Vladimir Tsyplakov, 50, Belarusian ice hockey player (Los Angeles Kings, Buffalo Sabres).
- Irv Williams, 100, American jazz saxophonist.
- Doug Woog, 75, American ice hockey coach (Minnesota Golden Gophers).
- Barbara Wright, 84, Irish academic and translator.
- Ken Wright, 94, Australian politician, member of the Victorian Legislative Council (1973–1992).

=== 15 ===
- Ron Areshenkoff, 62, Canadian hockey player (Edmonton Oilers) and coach.
- Jean de Viguerie, 84, French historian.
- Alfred Dennis, 95, Australian politician, MLA (1959–1962).
- Alan Doble, 76, Australian cricketer (Victoria).
- Tommy Forgan, 90, English footballer (York City).
- Yuan-Cheng Fung, 100, Chinese-born American bioengineer.
- Wense Grabarek, 100, American politician, Mayor of Durham, North Carolina (1963–1971).
- Nicky Henson, 74, English actor (EastEnders, Syriana, Shine on Harvey Moon), cancer.
- Neil Peter Jampolis, 76, American stage director.
- Alan Jarvis, 76, Welsh footballer (Hull City, Mansfield Town, Everton).
- Rex Johnston, 82, American baseball player (Pittsburgh Pirates) and football player Pittsburgh Steelers), heart failure.
- James "Radio" Kennedy, 73, American football coach (T. L. Hanna High School), subject of Radio.
- Dudley Kernick, 98, English footballer (Torquay United) and commercial manager (Stoke City).
- Rajesh Khaitan, 75, Indian politician, MLA (1982–2001).
- Robert Kinkead, 67, American chef.
- David Lambie, 94, British politician, MP (1970–1992).
- Sonja Landweer, 86, Dutch artist.
- Monique Leyrac, 91, Canadian singer and actress.
- Sir Thomas Pearson, 105, British army general.
- Chuck Peddle, 82, American electrical engineer, designer of MOS Technology 6502, KIM-1 and Commodore PET, pancreatic cancer.
- Morgan Porteus, 102, American clergyman of the Episcopal Church, Bishop of Connecticut (1977–1981).
- Elliot Schewel, 95, American politician.
- I. D. Swami, 90, Indian politician.
- Tian Bo, 87, Chinese virologist.
- Andrew Woodhouse, 96, British Anglican priest, Archdeacon of Ludlow (1970–1982) and Hereford (1982–1991).

=== 16 ===
- Børge Kaas Andersen, 82, Danish Olympic rower.
- Stephen F. Barker, 92, American philosopher.
- Basil Butcher, 86, Guyanese cricketer (national team, West Indies).
- Leah J. Dickstein, 85, American psychiatrist.
- George Ferguson, 67, Canadian ice hockey player (Toronto Maple Leafs, Pittsburgh Penguins).
- Bentley Kassal, 102, American attorney, member of the New York State Assembly (1957–1962).
- Sir Hans Kornberg, 91, German-born British-American biochemist.
- Jürgen Kühling, 85, German jurist, judge of the Federal Constitutional Court (1989–2001).
- Peter Larkin, 93, American stage designer, four-time Tony winner.
- Bernard Lefèvre, 89, French Olympic footballer (1952).
- Bertrand Lemennicier, 76, French economist.
- Sukhendu Maity, 92, Indian politician, MLA (1987–1991).
- Mama Cax, 30, Haitian-American model, cancer.
- Sherry Anne Reed, 60, American marine biologist, cancer.
- Pál Romány, 90, Hungarian agrarian engineer, politician, Minister of Agriculture and Food (1975–1980).
- Rich Rundles, 38, American baseball player (Cleveland Indians).
- Bill Simpson, 79, American racing driver and businessman (Simpson Performance Products), stroke.
- Madonna Staunton, 81, Australian artist and poet.
- Sevim Tekeli, 94, Turkish historian of science.
- Rob Tillard, 95, English cricketer and army officer.
- T. Torechu, 71, Indian politician, MLA (since 2003).
- Averil Williams, 84, British Olympic athlete (1960).

=== 17 ===
- Karin Balzer, 81, German hurdler, Olympic champion (1964).
- Zafar Chaudhry, 93, Pakistani air marshal, airline executive and human rights activist, Chief of Air Staff (1972–1974), cardiac arrest.
- Da Chen, 57, Chinese-born American novelist, lung cancer.
- Enzio d'Antonio, 94, Italian Roman Catholic prelate, Archbishop of Lanciano-Ortona (1982–2000).
- Hayden Fry, 90, American Hall of Fame college football player (Baylor Bears) and coach (Iowa Hawkeyes), cancer.
- Jacques Grimbert, 90, French conductor.
- Connie Hartnett, 68, Irish football player (Cork GAA).
- Malcolm Heath, 89, English cricketer.
- Ron Hogg, 68, British police officer, Durham Police and Crime Commissioner (since 2012), amyotrophic lateral sclerosis.
- Bronco Horvath, 89, Canadian ice hockey player (Boston Bruins, New York Rangers, Chicago Blackhawks).
- Imre Kaffka, 88, Hungarian Olympic rower.
- Cuchlaine King, 97, British geomorphologist.
- Scot Kleinendorst, 59, American ice hockey player (New York Rangers, Hartford Whalers), workplace accident.
- Shriram Lagoo, 92, Indian actor (Gharaonda, Thodisi Bewafaii, Maqsad).
- Cândido Lorenzo González, 94, Spanish-born Brazilian Roman Catholic prelate, Bishop of São Raimundo Nonato (1969–2002).
- Gordon Daniel Morgan, 88, American sociologist.
- Kaushalendra Pratap Shahi, 103, Indian politician, MLA (1967–1969).
- Gerry Sharpe, 73, English footballer (Bristol City).
- Tom White, 80, Scottish footballer (Bury, Crystal Palace).
- Peter Wollen, 81, British film theorist and filmmaker.

=== 18 ===
- Al Adinolfi, 85, American politician, member of the Connecticut House of Representatives (1999–2001, 2003–2009, 2011–2017).
- Patxi Andión, 72, Spanish singer-songwriter, musician and actor (The Compass Rose), traffic collision.
- Claudine Auger, 78, French actress (Thunderball, Le Masque de fer) and model (Miss France Monde, 1958).
- Alain Barrière, 84, French singer ("Elle était si jolie").
- Tunç Başaran, 81, Turkish film director (Ayşecik ve Sihirli Cüceler Rüyalar Ülkesinde, Don't Let Them Shoot the Kite, Piano Piano Kid) and screenwriter.
- Richard L. Bishop, 88, American mathematician.
- Herman Boone, 84, American football coach (T. C. Williams High School), subject of Remember the Titans.
- Jacques Bravo, 75, French politician, Councillor of Paris (1995–2014).
- Sylvia Chant, 60, British geographer.
- Geulah Cohen, 93, Israeli politician, member of Knesset (1974–1992) and founder of Tehiya, Israel Prize recipient (2003).
- Mary Cosh, 100, British freelance journalist and local historian.
- Leandro Despouy, 72, Argentine human rights lawyer, President of United Nations Commission on Human Rights (2001–2002).
- Ibrahim Diarra, 36, French rugby union player (Castres Olympique), heart attack.
- Marron Curtis Fort, 81, American-born German linguist.
- Abdollah Khodabandeh, 83, Iranian Olympic wrestler (1964).
- Kenny Lynch, 81, English singer ("You Can Never Stop Me Loving You"), actor (Carry On Loving, The Playbirds) and entertainer.
- Arty McGlynn, 75, Irish guitarist (Patrick Street).
- Doug Ricketson, 89, Australian rugby league player (Sydney Roosters).
- Jagdev Singh Rai, 50, Indian Olympic hockey player (1992).
- Ellen Shub, 73, American photojournalist, Creutzfeldt Jakob Disease.
- Abbey Simon, 99, American classical pianist.
- Benjamin Uwajumogu, 51, Nigerian politician.

=== 19 ===
- Ricardo de Aparici, 79, Argentine lawyer and politician, Governor of Jujuy Province (1987–1990).
- Francisco Brennand, 92, Brazilian sculptor.
- Neil Cameron, 81, Canadian politician, academic and journalist, MNA (1989–1994).
- Jules Deelder, 75, Dutch poet.
- Jan de Laval, 71, Swedish actor.
- Sir Alex Jarratt, 95, British businessman and civil servant.
- Ward Just, 84, American journalist and author, Lewy body dementia.
- Saoul Mamby, 72, American boxer, WBC super lightweight champion (1980–1982).
- Brian Mayes, 85, British army officer, Director General Army Medical Services (1993–1996).
- George Metallinos, 79, Greek priest, theologian and author.
- Yoshio Mochizuki, 72, Japanese politician, MP (1996–2009, since 2011).
- John Trice Nixon, 86, American judge.
- José Miguel Oviedo, 85, Peruvian writer and literary critic.
- Edward A. Richardson, 95, American tree expert.
- Dale Russell, 81, Canadian palaeontologist.
- Stanley J. Stein, 99, American historian.
- Harriet Trudell, 87, American political activist.
- Arthur Verow, 77, American politician, member of the Maine House of Representatives (2013–2017, since 2019), heart attack.
- Shahdon Winchester, 27, Trinidadian footballer (W Connection, FF Jaro, national team), traffic collision.
- Dean Woodman, 91, American businessman.
- Alba Zaluar, 77, Brazilian anthropologist.

=== 20 ===
- Sir Fazle Hasan Abed, 83, Bangladeshi philanthropist, founder of BRAC, complications from a brain tumour.
- Matti Ahde, 73, Finnish politician, MP (1970–1990, 2003–2011), pancreatic cancer.
- Dick Anthony, 87, American musician.
- Zilda Cardoso, 83, Brazilian actress.
- Thomas Chandy, 72, Indian politician, MLA (since 2006).
- Robert Creech, 91, Canadian horn player and arts administrator.
- Rick Fisher, 71, American basketball player (Utah Stars).
- Frank Foster, 79, English rugby league player and coach.
- Hermann L. Gremliza, 79, German journalist.
- Billy Hughes, 70, Scottish footballer (Sunderland, Leicester City, national team).
- John Irwin, 79, American poet and literary critic.
- Junior Johnson, 88, American Hall of Fame racing driver (NASCAR Cup Series) and team owner (Junior Johnson & Associates).
- Ambrose Kiapseni, 74, Papua New Guinean Roman Catholic prelate, Bishop of Kavieng (1991–2018).
- Eduard Krieger, 73, Austrian footballer (Austria Wien, LASK, national team).
- Klaus Uwe Ludwig, 76, German church music director and concert organist.
- Bashir Maan, 93, Pakistani-British politician.
- Roland Matthes, 69, German Hall of Fame swimmer, multiple world record holder, Olympic (1968, 1972) and world (1973, 1975) champion.
- Kay McShane, 70, Irish wheelchair athlete.
- Robert Moir, 58, Australian medical researcher, glioblastoma.
- Denis Norman, 89, British-born Zimbabwean politician, Minister of Agriculture (1980–1985) and Transport (1990–1997).
- Marko Orlandić, 89, Montenegrin politician, Prime Minister (1974–1978) and President (1983–1984).
- Yuri Pshenichnikov, 79, Soviet-born Russian football player (Pakthakor Tashkent, CSKA Moscow, USSR national team) and manager.
- Laverne Schroeder, 86, American politician.
- Daniel Selvaraj, 81, Indian novelist.
- L. S. Sheshagiri Rao, 94, Indian writer and academic.
- Bruce M. Snell Jr., 90, American judge, Justice of the Iowa Supreme Court (1987–2001).
- Woody Vasulka, 82, American filmmaker and pioneer of video art.

=== 21 ===
- Janet Ackland, 81, Welsh lawn and indoor bowler.
- Gerry Alanguilan, 51, Filipino comic book artist and writer (Wasted, Elmer, X-Men).
- Jimmy Allen, 67, American football player (Detroit Lions, Pittsburgh Steelers).
- Norm Angelini, 72, American baseball player (Kansas City Royals).
- Stefan Angelov, 72, Bulgarian wrestler, Olympic bronze medalist (1972, 1976).
- Ali Argon, 89, Turkish-born American engineer.
- François Autain, 84, French politician, Senator (1983–2011).
- Ramachandra Babu, 72, Indian cinematographer (Dweepu, Chamaram, Oru Vadakkan Veeragatha), heart attack.
- Peter Bartlett, 90, New Zealand architect and academic (University of Auckland).
- Ronald Bowlby, 93, British Anglican clergyman, Bishop of Southwark (1980–1991).
- Leslie Brent, 94, British immunologist and zoologist.
- Deng Hongxun, 88, Chinese politician and engineer, Communist Party Secretary of Hainan (1990–1993).
- Hilary B. Doran Jr., 83, American politician.
- Edward George Effros, 84, American mathematician.
- Gerald A. Feltham, 81, Canadian accounting researcher.
- Roger Goossens, 93, Belgian Olympic hockey player (1948, 1952, 1956, 1960).
- William Higgins, 74, American gay pornographic film director (Big Guns), heart attack.
- Louis Jenkins, 77, American poet.
- Frankie Kennedy, 78, Irish Gaelic footballer (Drumlane).
- Isaac Kramnick, 81, American historian.
- Li Rongrong, 75, Chinese politician, Chairman of the State-owned Assets Supervision and Administration Commission (2003–2010).
- Lin Zonghu, 86, Chinese thermal engineer, member of the Chinese Academy of Engineering.
- G. Nanjundan, 58, Indian writer. (death announced on this date)
- Andrew Clennel Palmer, 81, British engineer, Fellow of the Royal Society (1994)
- Ron Penny, 82, Polish-born Australian immunologist.
- Martin Peters, 76, English football player (West Ham United, Norwich City, national team) and manager, World Cup winner (1966).
- Steve Poleskie, 81, American artist and writer.
- Lidio Rainaldi, 90, American politician, member of the New Mexico Senate (2001–2008).
- Joseph Segel, 88, American direct marketer (QVC, Advertising Specialty Institute, The Franklin Mint).
- Muhammad Shahrur, 81, Syrian Islamic scholar.
- Bolotbek Shamshiyev, 78, Kyrgyz film director (The White Ship).
- Banwari Lal Sharma, 61, Indian politician, MLA (since 2018), cancer.
- Sam Strahan, 74, New Zealand rugby union player (Manawatu, national team).
- Doug Templeton, 91, Scottish motorcycle speedway rider.
- Emanuel Ungaro, 86, French fashion designer.
- Krisztián Zahorecz, 44, Hungarian footballer (Kaposvári Rákóczi, Szolnoki MÁV, Bajai LSE).

=== 22 ===
- Georget Bertoncello, 76, Belgian footballer (Sporting Charleroi, Liège, Olympic Charleroi).
- Thor Bjarne Bore, 81, Norwegian newspaper editor and politician, Chair of Norwegian Church Aid (since 2000).
- Tony Britton, 95, British actor (Operation Amsterdam, Sunday Bloody Sunday, The Day of the Jackal).
- Myrtle Cagle, 94, American pilot, member of Mercury 13.
- Mahmudul Amin Choudhury, 82, Bangladeshi judge, Chief Justice (2001–2002).
- Pier Giorgio Di Cicco, 70, Italian-born Canadian poet, heart attack.
- Leo Corbet, 83, American politician.
- Unto Hautalahti, 83, Finnish Olympic cyclist.
- Sidney Holt, 93, British marine biologist.
- Greg Kirk, 56, American politician, member of the Georgia State Senate (since 2014), bile duct cancer.
- Fritz Künzli, 73, Swiss footballer (national team).
- Bill Lambert, 89, New Zealand politician, MP for Western Hutt (1975–1978).
- Ronald Melzack, 90, Canadian psychologist, founding editor of Textbook of Pain.
- Karl E. Meyer, 91, American journalist.
- Mohammad Ebadot Hossain Mondal, 80, Bangladeshi politician, MP (1979–1982).
- Maurizio Noci, 82, Italian politician, MP (1979–1983, 1985–1992).
- Ubirajara Penacho dos Reis, 85, Brazilian musician (Programa do Jô), stroke.
- Ram Dass, 88, American spiritual teacher, psychologist and author (Be Here Now).
- Édison Realpe, 23, Ecuadorian footballer (Guayaquil City, L.D.U. Quito), traffic collision.
- Billy Slade, 78, Welsh cricketer (Glamorgan).
- Elizabeth Spencer, 98, American novelist (The Light in the Piazza).
- Gary Talbot, 82, English footballer (Chester, Crewe Alexandra, Drumcondra), lung cancer.

=== 23 ===
- Jean Blot, 96, Russian-born French writer and translator.
- John Cain, 88, Australian politician, Premier of Victoria (1982–1990), stroke.
- Carl R. Deckard, 58, American inventor (SLS).
- David Foster, 90, American film producer (The Thing, Short Circuit, The Getaway).
- George Gau, 72, American academic administrator, glioblastoma.
- Jamie Lee Hamilton, 64, Canadian politician and sex worker advocate.
- Alan Harrington, 86, Welsh footballer (Cardiff City, national team).
- Elmer Beseler Harris, 80, American businessman (Alabama Power) and political strategist.
- Robert Larsen, 88, American football coach.
- Duncan MacKay, 82, Scottish footballer (Celtic, Perth, national team).
- Brian McGuinness, 92, British philosopher.
- Mr. Niebla, 46, Mexican professional wrestler (CMLL), blood infection.
- Mustafa Mujezinović, 64, Bosnian politician, Prime Minister of the Federation of Bosnia and Herzegovina (2009–2011).
- Dick Pellow, 88, American politician.
- George Petchey, 88, English football player (Queens Park Rangers, Crystal Palace) and manager (Leyton Orient).
- Wanda Pimentel, 76, Brazilian painter.
- Fred B. Rooney, 94, American politician, member of the U.S. House of Representatives (1963–1979) and Pennsylvania State Senate (1958–1963).
- Charles Rubia, 96, Kenyan politician, MP (1969–1988) and Mayor of Nairobi (1963–1967).
- Ahmed Gaid Salah, 79, Algerian military officer, Chief of Staff of the People's National Army (since 2004), heart attack.
- John Simonian, 84, Kenyan Olympic hockey player, (1960, 1964, 1968).
- Georgeta Snegur, 82, Romanian-born Moldovan socialite, First Lady (1990–1997).
- Ulla Trenter, 83, Swedish author.
- Ganga Prasad Vimal, 80, Indian writer, traffic collision.
- Bob Wade, 76, American sculptor and artist, heart failure.

=== 24 ===
- Edward Aschoff, 34, American sports journalist (ESPN), hemophagocytic lymphohistiocytosis.
- Giacomo Bazzan, 69, Italian Olympic cyclist (1972).
- Fred Emmer, 85, Dutch news anchor (NOS Journaal).
- Kelly Fraser, 26, Canadian Inuktitut pop singer and songwriter, suicide.
- Rusty Hilger, 57, American football player (Los Angeles Raiders, Detroit Lions, Seattle Seahawks), cancer.
- David Hogness, 94, American scientist.
- Walter Horak, 88, Austrian footballer (Wiener Sport Club, Sochaux, national team).
- Prasanna Jayawardena, 63, Sri Lankan puisne justice of the Supreme Court (2016–2019).
- Sergei Karimov, 33, Kazakh footballer (Wolfsburg, MSV Duisburg, national team).
- Karen D. King, 48, American mathematician.
- Sydney Leach, 95, British scientist.
- Andrew Miller, 70, British politician, MP (1992–2015).
- Dave Riley, 59, American bassist (Big Black), throat cancer.
- Werner Franz Siebenbrock, 82, German Roman Catholic prelate, Bishop of Governador Valadares (2001–2014).
- Noor-Ali Tabandeh, 92, Iranian Islamic Sufi leader, Qutb of the Ni'matullāhī.
- Toyoko Tokiwa, 91, Japanese photographer.
- Allee Willis, 72, American Hall of Fame songwriter ("I'll Be There for You", "September") and lyricist (The Color Purple), cardiac arrest.

=== 25 ===
- Patricia Alice Albrecht, 66, American actress (Jem, The New Yogi Bear Show, Midnight Madness) and writer.
- Dario Antoniozzi, 96, Italian politician, MP (1953–1980), Secretary of the Council of Ministers (1970–1972) and MEP (1979–1989).
- Ari Behn, 47, Norwegian author, member of the royal family (2002–2017), suicide.
- Vladimir Bushin, 95, Russian writer and literary critic.
- Neville Buswell, 76, British actor (Coronation Street).
- Sultana Rezwan Chowdhury, 71, Bangladeshi politician, MP (1986–1988).
- Ethella Chupryk, 55, Ukrainian pianist.
- John Davidson, 93, British chemical engineer.
- Táňa Fischerová, 72, Czech actress (Hotel for Strangers), civic activist and politician, MP (2002–2006).
- William Freeburn, 89, Scottish footballer (Grimsby Town, Dunfermline Athletic, East Stirlingshire).
- Makhmut Gareev, 96, Russian military officer, Deputy Chief of the Soviet General Staff (1984–1992).
- Eliot Glassheim, 81, American politician, member of the North Dakota House of Representatives (1993–2017).
- William Greider, 83, American economics journalist (The Washington Post, The Nation, Rolling Stone), complications from heart failure.
- Andy Hassler, 68, American baseball player (California Angels, Kansas City Royals, New York Mets).
- Roz Joseph, 93, American photographer, cardiovascular disease.
- Martyn King, 82, English footballer (Colchester United, Wrexham).
- Desmond King-Hele, 92, British scientist, poet and author.
- Johnny Matthews, 73, English football player (Waterford, Limerick) and manager (Newcastlewest).
- Lee Mendelson, 86, American television producer (Peanuts), lung cancer.
- Yiannis Papadimitriou, 107, Greek lawyer, pro-democracy activist and politician, MP (1956–1967).
- William B. Pratt, 84, American politician, member of the New Mexico House of Representatives (since 2018), complications from a stroke.
- Niju Ram, Indian politician, MLA (1977–1982).
- Peter Schreier, 84, German operatic tenor and conductor.
- Chuck Turner, 79, American politician and activist, member of the Boston City Council (1999–2010).
- Albano Vicariotto, 88, Italian footballer (Milan, Palermo, Pro Patria).
- Fern Villeneuve, 92, Canadian fighter pilot.

=== 26 ===
- Badeti Bujji, 55, Indian politician, MLA (2014–2019), heart attack.
- Jocelyn Burdick, 97, American politician, U.S. Senator (1992).
- Les Chadwick, 76, English bass player (Gerry and the Pacemakers), brain cancer.
- Bill Cregar, 94, American football player (Pittsburgh Steelers).
- Hans-Jörg Criens, 59, German footballer (Borussia Mönchengladbach, Nürnberg).
- Roger De Wilde, 79, Belgian Olympic water polo player (1960, 1964).
- Elbert Dubenion, 86, American football player (Buffalo Bills).
- Nicolas Estgen, 89, Luxembourgish politician, MEP (1979–1994).
- Arjan Hasid, 89, Indian poet.
- Jerry Herman, 88, American composer (Hello, Dolly!, Mame, La Cage aux Folles) and lyricist, pulmonary disease.
- Desmond Julian, 93, British cardiologist.
- Sleepy LaBeef, 84, American rockabilly singer.
- Kenneth C. Laudon, 75, American information systems researcher.
- Sue Lyon, 73, American actress (Lolita, The Night of the Iguana, 7 Women).
- Nguyễn Văn Tý, 94, Vietnamese composer.
- Eigil Nielsen, 71, Danish footballer (Winterthur, Basel, national team).
- Ángel Pontarolo, 82, Argentine Olympic rower.
- Kushal Punjabi, 42, Indian actor (Ishq Mein Marjawan, Kaal) and reality television contestant (Zor Ka Jhatka: Total Wipeout), suicide by hanging.
- Gary Starkweather, 81, American engineer and inventor (laser printer), leukemia.
- Galina Volchek, 86, Russian actress (Don Quixote, Beware of the Car, Autumn Marathon) and film director, People's Artist of the USSR (1989), pneumonia.

=== 27 ===
- Quentin V. Anderson, 87, American politician.
- Dick Bokelmann, 93, American baseball player (St. Louis Cardinals).
- Ulysses Currie, 84, American politician, member of the Maryland House of Delegates (1987–1995) and Senate (1995–2019).
- Romà Cuyàs i Sol, 81, Spanish Olympic sports commissioner, president of the Spanish Olympic Committee (1983–1984) and the National Sports Council (1982–1987).
- Bill Danychuk, 79, Canadian football player (Hamilton Tiger-Cats).
- Sachhidanand Narayan Deb, 98, Indian politician, MLA (1971–1977).
- Takehiko Endo, 81, Japanese politician, MP (1986–1993, 1996–2009) and Minister of Agriculture, Forestry and Fisheries (2007), pneumonia.
- Don Imus, 79, American radio personality (Imus in the Morning), complications from lung disease.
- Phillip Carl Jablonski, 73, American serial killer.
- J. Charles Jones, 82, American civil rights activist, co-founder of the Student Nonviolent Coordinating Committee.
- Bernard Lavigne, 65, French rugby union player (Agen, national team).
- Garrett List, 76, American trombonist, vocalist and composer.
- Neal Peirce, 87, American columnist and author on urban affairs, glioblastoma.
- Remilia, 24, American professional video game player (League of Legends Championship Series).
- Ilias Rosidis, 92, Greek footballer (Olympiacos, national team).
- John Rothchild, 74, American writer.
- Eunus Ali Sarkar, 66, Bangladeshi politician, MP (since 2014), lung cancer.
- Jack Sheldon, 88, American trumpeter (The Merv Griffin Show), singer ("I'm Just a Bill") and voice actor (Schoolhouse Rock!).
- Jasbir Singh, 78, Indian politician, MLA (1992–1997), heart attack.
- Wolfgang Sühnholz, 73, German-born American footballer and coach.
- Art Sullivan, 69, Belgian singer, pancreatic cancer.
- Ann Spokes Symonds, 94, English author and politician, Mayor of Oxford (1976).
- Fabien Thiémé, 67, French politician, Mayor of Marly (since 2008), Deputy (1988–1993).

=== 28 ===
- Robert Baden-Powell, 3rd Baron Baden-Powell, 83, British scouting leader.
- Indramoni Bora, 81, Indian politician, MP (1991–2007).
- Maynard J. Brichford, 93, American archivist.
- Mirko Crepaldi, 47, Italian racing cyclist, heart attack.
- John Christopher Dancy, 99, British headmaster (Lancing College, Marlborough College).
- Dieter Danzberg, 79, German footballer (Bayern Munich, Rot-Weiß Oberhausen, Freiburger FC).
- Vilhjálmur Einarsson, 85, Icelandic athlete, Olympic silver medallist (1956).
- Nilcéa Freire, 66, Brazilian academic and politician, President of the Inter-American Commission of Women (2005–2007), cancer.
- Fred Graham, 88, American legal correspondent (CBS News) and television anchor (Court TV), Peabody Award winner (1974), Parkinson's disease.
- Wendell Hayes, 79, American football player (Kansas City Chiefs, Denver Broncos, Dallas Cowboys).
- Richard M. Ivey, 94, Canadian lawyer and philanthropist.
- Horst Kwech, 82, Austrian-born Australian racecar driver.
- Carley Ann McCord, 30, American sports reporter (WDSU, Cox Sports Television), plane crash.
- Thanos Mikroutsikos, 72, Greek composer and politician, Minister of Culture (1994–1996).
- Amy Patterson, 107, Argentine composer, singer and poet.
- Anthony Ribustello, 53, American actor (The Sopranos, Be Cool, Uptown Girls).
- Fred Richmond, 96, American politician, member of the U.S. House of Representatives (1975–1982), pneumonia.
- Marshall L. Saunders, 80, American climate activist, founder of the Citizens' Climate Lobby.
- Izzy Slapawitz, 71, American professional wrestler, manager and commentator (ICW), complications during surgery.
- Erzsébet Szőnyi, 95, Hungarian composer and music pedagogue, vice-president of the International Society for Music Education (1970–1974).
- Chico Teixeira, 61, Brazilian screenwriter and director (Alice's House, Absence).
- Michael Trikilis, 79, American film and television producer (Playboy TV).

=== 29 ===
- Dina Birte Al-Erhayem, 44, Danish actress, suicide.
- LaDell Andersen, 90, American basketball coach (Utah State Aggies, Utah Stars, BYU Cougars).
- Abu Raihan Biswas, 79, Indian politician, MLA (1972–1977).
- Valentin Bogomazov, 76, Russian diplomat, ambassador to Peru (1997–2001) and Ecuador (2004–2008).
- Carla Calò, 93, Italian actress (Totò Le Mokò, Captain Falcon, One Thousand Dollars on the Black).
- Radhakrishnan Dhanarajan, 39, Indian footballer (Mohammedan, East Bengal), heart attack.
- Sebastián Ferrat, 41, Mexican actor (Amar de nuevo, El Señor de los Cielos, El Vato), complications from food poisoning.
- Alasdair Gray, 85, Scottish visual artist and author (Lanark).
- Neil Innes, 75, English comedian (Monty Python), musician (The Rutles, Bonzo Dog Doo-Dah Band) and writer, heart attack.
- Paul X. Kelley, 91, American general, Commandant of the Marine Corps (1983–1987).
- Harri Klein, 77, Brazilian Olympic rower.
- Talukder Moniruzzaman, 81, Bangladeshi political scientist.
- Fred Mukisa, 70, Ugandan educator and politician, MP (2006–2011), cancer.
- Vaughan Oliver, 62, British graphic designer (4AD).
- Giovanni Paliaga, 88, Italian Olympic swimmer, (1952).
- M. C. Ricklefs, 76, Australian orientalist.
- Butler D. Shaffer, 84, American author and law professor.
- John Shuker, 77, British footballer (Oxford United).
- Sheesharam Singh, 74, Indian politician, MLA (2007–2012).
- Oluf Skarpnes, 87, Norwegian jurist.
- Manfred Stolpe, 83, German politician, Minister of Transport (2002–2005), liver cancer.
- Ken Strongman, 79, British-born New Zealand psychologist and academic.
- Norma Tanega, 80, American musician, singer-songwriter and artist, cancer.
- Harry Villegas, 79, Cuban Communist guerrilla and writer.
- Vishwesha Tirtha, 88, Indian Dvaita Vedanta spiritual leader, Seer of Pejawara Matha (since 1952), pneumonia.
- Neal Watlington, 97, American baseball player (Philadelphia Athletics).
- Anthony Wilden, 84, British academic.
- Zhang Jiaxiang, 87, Chinese astronomer.

=== 30 ===
- Syed Muazzem Ali, 75, Bangladeshi diplomat.
- Beatriz Alfonso Nogue, 51, Spanish chess player.
- Piara Singh Bhaniara, 61, Indian Dalit religious leader, co-author of Bhavsagar Granth.
- Valentin Bliznyuk, 91, Russian aircraft designer, Tupolev design bureau (Tupolev Tu-160).
- Micky Block, 79, English football player (Chelsea F.C.).
- Marion Chesney, 83, Scottish novelist (Death of a Gossip, Death of an Outsider, Agatha Raisin and the Deadly Dance).
- Marie Devereux, 79, English actress.
- Tommy Dingwall, 89, Scottish politician.
- Dragomir Draganov, 71, Bulgarian historian and politician, MP (1997–2001).
- Antônio Dumas, 64, Brazilian football player (Santos) and manager (Togo national team, Equatorial Guinea national team).
- Jan Fedder, 64, German actor (Großstadtrevier, Das Boot, Soul Kitchen), cancer.
- Jack Garfein, 89, Czechoslovak-born American film producer and director (The Strange One, Something Wild), co-founder of the Hollywood Theatre Row.
- Prosper Grech, 94, Maltese Roman Catholic cardinal, co-founder of the Patristic Institute Augustinianum.
- Gertrude Himmelfarb, 97, American historian.
- Kenneth A. Kershaw, 89, British-Canadian botanist and lichenologist.
- Vibeke Klint, 92, Danish textile artist.
- Harry Kupfer, 84, German opera director.
- Myron Levoy, 89, American author (Alan and Naomi).
- Slaheddine Maaoui, 69, Tunisian journalist and politician, Minister of Tourism (1995–2001), heart attack.
- Damiri Mahmud, 74, Indonesian writer.
- Giovanni Innocenzo Martinelli, 77, Libyan-Italian Roman Catholic prelate, Apostolic Vicar of Tripoli (1985–2017).
- Syd Mead, 86, American concept artist (Blade Runner, Aliens, Tron), lymphoma.
- Sonny Mehta, 77, Indian-British-American publishing executive (Knopf Doubleday Publishing Group).
- José Manuel Moreiras, 43, Argentine footballer (Rosario Central, Brasilia, Sport Huancayo), shot.
- Grant Munro, 83, Canadian ice hockey player.
- Gene Nicholson, 78, American football coach.
- Addison Rerecich, 20, American double lung transplant recipient, lung disease.
- Carl-Heinz Rühl, 80, German football player (MSV Duisburg, 1. FC Köln) and manager (Borussia Dortmund).
- Elizabeth Sellars, 98, Scottish actress (The Barefoot Contessa, 55 Days at Peking, The Webster Boy).
- Betty Shellenberger, 98, American field hockey player and lacrosse player.
- Dennis Showalter, 77, American historian.
- André Smets, 76, Belgian politician, Mayor of Herve (1985–2010).
- Nils Petter Sundgren, 90, Swedish film critic and television presenter (Filmkrönikan).
- Gennadiy Valyukevich, 61, Belarusian triple jumper, European indoor champion (1979).
- Johnny Ward, 78, English rugby league footballer (Castleford, England, Great Britain)
- Charles Williams, Baron Williams of Elvel, 86, British business executive and cricketer, member of the House of Lords (1985–2019).
- Vikho-o Yhoshü, 67, Indian politician, MLA (since 2013), lung cancer.

=== 31 ===
- Serikbolsyn Abdildin, 82, Kazakh economist and politician, Chairman of the Supreme Soviet of Kazakhstan (1991–1993).
- Peeter Allik, 53, Estonian surrealist painter.
- Stacey Bentley, 62, American bodybuilder and nurse.
- Daniel P. Biebuyck, 94, Belgian art historian.
- Rene Daalder, 75, Dutch writer and director.
- Djimrangar Dadnadji, 65, Chadian politician, Prime Minister (2013), stroke.
- Sylvester R. Foley Jr., 91, American naval admiral.
- Pierre Galet, 98, French ampelographer and author.
- Muhammadu Gawo, 65, Nigerian politician, member of the Jigawa State House of Assembly (since 2015).
- Chucrallah Harb, 96, Lebanese Maronite hierarch, Bishop of Baalbek (1967–1977) and Jounieh (1977–1999).
- Ratko Janev, 80, Macedonian atomic physicist.
- Ernie Jones, 87, Irish golfer.
- Vic Juris, 66, American jazz guitarist, liver cancer.
- Raymond M. Kirk, 96, British surgeon and academic.
- J. L. Lewis, 59, American golfer, multiple myeloma.
- Janet Lowe, 79, American biographer and financial journalist, ovarian cancer.
- Diana Martin, 77, New Zealand microbiologist.
- Coralie O'Connor, 85, American Olympic swimmer.
- Guðrún Ögmundsdóttir, 69, Icelandic politician, cancer.
- Shahla Riahi, 93, Iranian actress and film director (Marjan).
- Shyqyri Rreli, 89, Albanian football player (Puna Tirana, Dinamo Tirana) and manager (national team).
- Eva Sørensen, 79, Danish sculptor.
- A. V. Swamy, 90, Indian politician, MP (2012–2018).
- Ivo-Valentino Tomaš, 26, Croatian footballer (Dugopolje, Oldenburg, SSV Jeddeloh), suicide by hanging.
- Noel Jan Tyl, 83, American humanistic astrologer.
- Basil Watts, 93, English rugby league player (York Wasps, England national team, Great Britain national team), world champion (1954).
- Martin West, 82, American actor (Assault on Precinct 13, Freckles, As the World Turns).
