= Susan Gurley McBee =

American politician

Member of the Texas House of Representatives from the 70th district
- In office January 14, 1975 – January 11, 1983
- Preceded by: Hilary B. Doran Jr.
- Succeeded by: Jack Vowell

Personal details
- Party: Democratic

Susan Gurley McBee is an American politician who served in the Texas House of Representatives from the 70th district from 1975 to 1983.
