= Bertoncello =

Bertoncello is an Italian surname. Notable people with the surname include:

- Georget Bertoncello (1943–2019), Belgian footballer
- Xavier Bertoncello (born 2005), Australian footballer
