= Gordon Morgan =

Gordon Morgan may refer to:

- Gordon Morgan (Australian cricketer) (1893–1967), Australian cricketer
- Gordon Daniel Morgan (1931–2019), American sociologist
- Gordon Morgan (English cricketer) (born 1959), English cricketer
- Gordon Morgan, leader of West Midlands County Council, 1981–1986

== See also ==
- Sir Gordon Morgan Holmes (1876–1965), British neurologist
