= Daigo =

Daigo may refer to:

== Buddhism ==
- Daigo (Zen) (大悟), a Buddhist term meaning great enlightenment or great realization
- Daigo (Shōbōgenzō) (大悟), or Great Realization, a book in Eihei Dōgen's Shōbōgenzō
- Daigo Temple (醍醐寺), from which Emperor Daigo took his name

== People ==
- Emperor Daigo (醍醐天皇), Emperor of Japan between 897 and 930
- Daigo family, a branch of the Ichijō family of Japanese nobility
- Daigo (name), a list of people with the Japanese masculine given name and surname
- Daigo (musician) (born 1978), Japanese singer-songwriter, actor, talent, and voice actor
- Daigo Umehara, or simply "Daigo", Japanese competitive fighting game player

== Places ==
- Daigo, Fushimi, Kyoto, a district in the ward of Fushimi-ku, Kyoto
- Daigo, Ibaraki (大子町), a town in Ibaraki Prefecture

== Other uses ==
- Daigo Station (Kyoto) (醍醐駅), a train station
- Daigo Station (Akita) (醍醐駅), a train station
- Daigo (dairy product) (醍醐), made in ancient Japan

== See also ==
- Daigou (代购), the unauthorized import of foreign goods into China
