= Seltman =

Seltman is a surname. Notable people with this name include:

- Charles Seltman (1886–1957), English art historian, writer, and numismatist
- Muriel Seltman (1927–2019), British left-wing activist, mathematics educator, historian of mathematics, and author

== See also ==
- Seltmans, a village of Weitnau, Bavaria, Germany
