= Daigo (name) =

- Gender: Male
- Language: Japanese

Origin
- Region of origin: Japan

Daigo is both a masculine Japanese given name and a surname. Notable people with the name include:

== Surname ==
- Daigo Fuyumoto (1648–1697), Japanese court noble who founded the family branch
- Naoyuki Daigo (born 1981), Japanese high jumper
- Tadashige Daigo (1891–1947), Imperial Japanese Navy admiral during World War II
- Takeo Daigo (醍醐 猛夫; 1938–2019), Japanese baseball player
- Toshirō Daigo (born 1926), Japanese 10th dan judoka

== Given name ==
- Daigo Araki (荒木 大吾; born 1994), Japanese footballer
- Daigo Furukawa (古川 大悟; born 1999), Japanese footballer
- Daigo Hara (原 大虎; born 1974), Japanese freestyle skier
- Daigo Hasegawa (長谷川 大悟; born 1990), Japanese athlete
- Daigo Higa (比嘉 大吾; born 1995), Japanese boxer
- Daigo Hisateru (1937–1983), Japanese sumo wrestler
- Daigō Kenshi (born 1952), Japanese sumo wrestler
- Daigo Kobayashi (小林 大悟; born 1983), footballer
- Daigo Matsui (松居 大悟; born 1985), Japanese screenwriter and film director
- Daigo Matsuura (松浦 大悟; born 1969), Japanese politician
- Daigo Naitō (内藤 大湖; born 1978), Japanese musician, main vocalist of Breakerz
- Daigo Nishi (西 大伍; born 1987), Japanese footballer
- Daigo Saito (斎藤 太吾; born 1980), Japanese professional drifting driver
- Daigo Takahashi (髙橋 大悟; born 1999), Japanese footballer
- Daigo Umehara (梅原 大吾; born 1981), Japanese professional video gamer
- Daigo Watanabe (渡邉 大剛; born 1984), Japanese footballer
