= Marian Matthews =

American politician

Member of the New Mexico House of Representatives from the 27th district
- Incumbent
- Assumed office January 7, 2020
- Preceded by: William B. Pratt
- Succeeded by: Abby Foster (elect)

Personal details
- Party: Democratic
- Education: Missouri State University (BA); University of New Mexico (JD)

Marian Matthews is an American politician, educator, and attorney serving as a member of the New Mexico House of Representatives from the 27th district, which includes a portion of Bernalillo County, New Mexico.

== Education ==
Matthews earned a Bachelor of Arts degree from Missouri State University and a Juris Doctor from the University of New Mexico School of Law.

== Career ==
Matthews began her career as a newspaper reporter in Springfield, Missouri and Alamogordo, New Mexico.

Prior to serving in the New Mexico House of Representatives, Matthews worked as a prosecutor and deputy attorney general of New Mexico under then-Attorney General Tom Udall. Matthews later worked as an instructor at the Central New Mexico Community College. Matthews was appointed to the House by the Bernalillo County Commission January 7, 2020, succeeding first-term legislator William B. Pratt, who died in office.

Matthews lost in her re-election bid during the 2026 New Mexico House of Representatives elections to lawyer Abby Foster. Foster, who was generally supported by progressives, criticized Matthews's opposition to paid family medical leave. During the campaign, Foster's campaign also filed an ethics complaint against Matthews due to a campaign text message which failed to disclose who paid for the advertisement. Matthews ultimately lost the election by 142 votes, the sole incumbent in the New Mexico House to lose re-election in a primary that year.

After the election, Matthews endorsed Foster's general election opponent, Republican Jahnelle Garcia. The decision received criticism from the Democratic establishment, including Speaker Javier Martínez, who stated he hoped Matthews would have a 'change of heart.'
