= Abby Foster =

American politician

Member-elect of the New Mexico House of Representatives from the 27th district
- Assuming office January 2027
- Succeeding: Marian Matthews

Personal details
- Party: Democratic

Abby Foster is an American politician. A member of the Democratic Party, she is the member-elect for the 27th district of the New Mexico House of Representatives.
