= Zhang Zhenxian =

Zhang Zhenxian (Chinese: 张振先; November 1927 – 2 December 2019) was a lieutenant general of the Chinese People's Liberation Army Air Force. He served as Political Commissar of the Jinan Military Region Air Force and the Guangzhou Military Region Air Force.

== Biography ==
Zhang was born in November 1927 in Xuzhou, Jiangsu, Republic of China. He enlisted in the New Fourth Army in January 1946 and joined the Chinese Communist Party in June of the same year. During the Chinese Civil War, he fought in the battles of Suzhong, Lianshui. Laiwu, Menglianggu, Kaifeng, Huaihai, and the Yangtze River Crossing Campaign.

After the founding of the People's Republic of China, Zhang entered the 7th Flight Academy of the People's Liberation Army Air Force (PLAAF) to train as a pilot. He rose through the ranks of the PLAAF, successively serving as pilot, squadron commander, group commander, regiment commander, division commander, and deputy chief of staff of the Shenyang Military Region Air Force. In the 1980s and 1990s he served as Political Commissar of the Jinan Military Region Air Force and the Guangzhou Military Region Air Force.

Zhang attained the rank of lieutenant general in 1988. He was a delegate to the 7th National People's Congress and the 8th Chinese People's Political Consultative Conference.

Zhang died in Guangzhou on 2 December 2019, aged 92.
