= Absence (film) =

2014 film

- Film poster
- Directed by: Chico Teixeira
- Written by: Chico Teixeira
- Starring: Matheus Fagundes
- Release date: September 2014
- Running time: 87 minutes
- Country: Brazil
- Language: Portuguese

Absence (Portuguese: Ausência) is a 2014 Brazilian drama film directed by Chico Teixeira. It was screened in the Panorama section of the 65th Berlin International Film Festival.

== Cast ==
- Matheus Fagundes as Serginho
- Irandhir Santos as Ney
- Gilda Nomacce as Luzia
- Thiago de Matos as Mudinho

== See also ==
- List of lesbian, gay, bisexual or transgender-related films of 2015
