= Nils Petter Sundgren =

Swedish film critic (1929–2019)

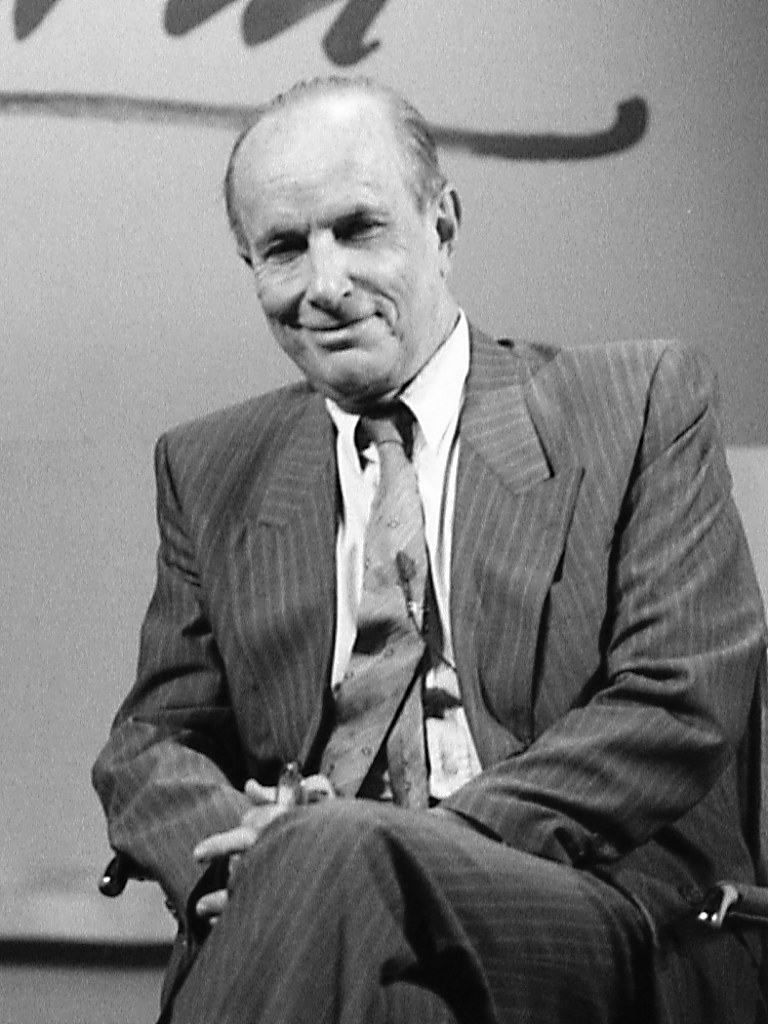
- Nils Petter Sundgren presenting Filmkrönikan in August 1988
- Born: 24 February 1929; Bromma, Sweden
- Died: 30 December 2019 (aged 90)
- Occupations: film critic, television presenter

Nils Henrik Christian Sundgren, known as Nils Petter Sundgren, (24 February 1929 – 30 December 2019) was a Swedish film critic and television presenter for Filmkrönikan broadcast on SVT.
