= Jean Deloche =

French teacher (1929–2019)

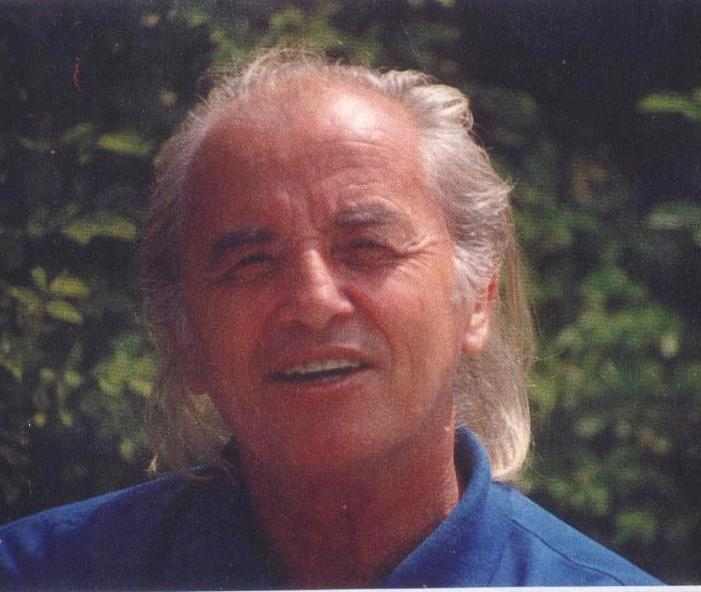
- Deloche in 2013
- Born: 19 September 1929; Le Grand-Bornand, France
- Died: 3 December 2019 (aged 90); Pondicherry, India
- Occupations: Researcher; Teacher

Jean Deloche (19 September 1929 – 3 December 2019) was a French teacher and researcher and correspondent for the French School of the Far East in Pondicherry, India.

== Biography ==
Jean Deloche first traveled to India in 1951, when he went on a trip on foot with his wife. He resumed studying history upon his return to France in 1954. From 1961 to 1962, Deloche was a teacher at Suryavarman II school in Siem Reap, Cambodia. From 1962 to 1966, he was director of the Alliance Française of Madras. In 1966, he joined the French School of the Far East as a researcher. He did additional research independently in Pondicherry. In 1982, he obtained his doctorate in humanities. From 1992 to 1994, he directed the center for history and archaeology at the EFEO. He was an associate member of the EFEO and the French Institute of Pondicherry.

Jean Deloche died on 3 December 2019.

== Research ==
Deloche focused on two different areas of history throughout his career: the study of 18th century French manuscripts regarding the political, economic, and social history of India, and the study of the history of Indian technology. His studies uncovered many previous lost parts of Indian history, and created many connections between India and France. Additionally, he carried out studies on military techniques of the Hoysala Empire using iconographic documents.

In 2008, Deloche won the Prix Hirayama, given by the Académie des Inscriptions et Belles-Lettres in Paris.
