= Robert Lucas (field hockey) =

French field hockey player (1922–2019)

Robert Charles Louis Lucas (5 October 1922 – 13 December 2019) was a French field hockey player who competed in the 1948 Summer Olympics and in the 1952 Summer Olympics. Lucas was born in Cambrai in October 1922 and died in Soorts-Hossegor in December 2019 at the age of 97.
