= Jon Comer =

American skateboarder (1976–2019)

Personal information
- Nationality: American
- Born: January 19, 1976
- Died: December 5, 2019 (aged 43)
- Home town: Dallas, Texas

Sport
- Sport: Skateboarding
- Disability: below knee amputation (right side)
- Turned pro: mid 90's

Jon Comer (January 19, 1976 – December 5, 2019) was the first professional skateboarder with a prosthetic limb (due to an amputated lower leg) and was regarded as the godfather of adaptive skateboarding. He was featured in the award-winning documentary Never Been Done. Jon earned the respect of skateboarding legends like Tony Hawk, Steve Caballero, and Mike Vallely who admired Jon's success and determination. Comer last resided in Garland, Texas.

Comer died on December 5, 2019, aged 43. The cause of death was not revealed.
