= G. Nanjundan =

Indian academic and writer (c.1961–2019)

- Born: c. 1961
- Died: December 2019 (aged 58)
- Occupations: Academic, Writer
- Awards: Sahitya Akademi Award for Tamil Translation (2012)

G. Nanjundan (c. 1961 – December 2019) was an Indian academic and writer. He was conferred Sahitya Akademi Award for Tamil Translation in 2012. He was a professor of Bangalore University's statistics department.

== Biography ==
Nanjundan was a professor of Bangalore University's statistics department. He was involved in teaching for over 32 years. He had more than 10 publications, too.

Nanjundan translated several Kannada books into Tamil. He translated more than 12 books from Kannada to Tamil. He was awarded Sahitya Akademi Award for Tamil Translation in 2012 for translation of Akka from Kannada into Tamil titled Akka. The original book was the short story collections of several women writers. He also translated Bhava and Avaste into Tamil which were written by U. R. Ananthamurthy.

Nanjundan was found dead on 21 December 2019 in his apartment.
