= Bob Fairchild =

American politician

Member of the Texas House of Representatives
- In office January 8, 1963 – January 8, 1965

Personal details
- Born: January 31, 1929 Beaumont, Texas, U.S.
- Died: December 1, 2019 (aged 90) Center, Texas, U.S.
- Party: Democratic

Robert Lewis Fairchild (January 31, 1929 – December 1, 2019) was an American politician. He served as a Democratic member in the Texas House of Representatives from 1963 to 1965. He had four children with wife Patsy.
