= Harriet Trudell =

American political activist (1932–2019)

- Born: Harriet Hope Hardbarger; August 22, 1932; St. Petersburg, Florida, U.S.
- Died: December 19, 2019 (aged 87); Las Vegas, Nevada, U.S.

Harriet Hope Trudell (née Hardbarger; August 22, 1932 – December 19, 2019) was an American political organizer and activist. She was a delegate at the 1976 Democratic National Convention and the 1980 Democratic National Convention. She ran the 1968 presidential campaign of Hubert Humphrey in Nevada and the 1972 presidential campaign of George McGovern in southern Nevada and served as an aide to Governor Mike O'Callaghan and Representative Harry Reid.

== Early life ==
Trudell was born Harriet Hope Hardbarger in St. Petersburg, Florida, on August 22, 1932. Her mother was a political cartoonist who died when her daughter was ten years old. Her father was a plumber and union organizer who strongly supported President Franklin D. Roosevelt. She grew up in St. Petersburg while the city was segregated and moved to Mobile, Alabama. When Trudell was sixteen, she attended the 1948 Democratic National Convention in Philadelphia, Pennsylvania, as her father was serving as a delegate for Alabama. While at the convention, she heard a speech by Hubert H. Humphrey on civil rights which inspired her to become involved in politics. In her twenties, she moved back to Florida where she participated in protests and worked to organize unions with the American Federation of Labor and Congress of Industrial Organizations (AFL-CIO) during the 1950s.

== Political activism ==
She moved to Las Vegas, Nevada, in summer 1962 with her husband and their two children, when her electrician husband was offered a job working on the Titan Missile at the Nevada testing site. After the move, Trudell became involved in politics. She was active in campaigning against nuclear waste, as well as in favor of school desegregation, the Equal Rights Amendment (ERA), welfare rights and abortion rights. She had strong opinions and a gained a number of nicknames from prominent Las Vegas attorneys, including George Foley who referred to her as "6 and 7/8ths" and Ralph Denton who called her "Boss Tweed". She marched with Martin Luther King Jr. in Selma, Alabama, in 1965.

She ran the Nevada campaign for the 1968 presidential campaign of Hubert Humphrey and the southern Nevada campaign for the 1972 presidential campaign of George McGovern. She was arrested while protesting welfare issues on the Vegas Strip in 1971. As part of the campaign to ratify the ERA, Trudell joined Renee Marchant Rampton in Salt Lake City, Utah, to protest the General Membership Conference of the Church of Jesus Christ of Latter-day Saints. The campaign in favor of ratification ultimately lost and Trudell became involved in the pro-choice movement. She was the state coordinator of a petition to put a referendum on the ballot in support of abortion rights.

Trudell was an alternate delegate at the 1976 Democratic National Convention after Jane Logan, a delegate who supported Jerry Brown, failed to show up. She was also a delegate at the 1980 Democratic National Convention, backing Jimmy Carter. She was elected as chair of the Nevada delegation, beating Jon Collins in a 9–8 vote. She worked as a southern Nevada aide between 1974 and 1978 for Governor Mike O'Callaghan and worked for Representative Harry Reid as his foreign affairs aide in Washington, D.C. between 1983 and 1986. She was denied a pay rise in her position working for O'Callaghan by a bill approved by the Nevada Senate Finance Committee in 1977, which was alleged to be based on her support for the ERA and her work campaigning against Senator Lee Walker the year prior.

She served on the board of the National Organization for Women (NOW), as a lobbyist for the Feminist Majority Foundation in the 1990s and was active in Operation Life. She was a member of the League of Women Voters and the Clark County Women's Democratic Club and was active in NOW's campaign "Elect Women 2000". She was a campaign director in Louisiana and travelled Tennessee, Virginia and South Carolina to recruit women to run for political office. Through her efforts, the number of women elected to the Louisiana State Legislature tripled. Trudell served as the political director for the Nevada State Democratic Party between 1998 and 2014.

== Death and legacy ==
Trudell was honored by Shelley Berkley on August 2, 2012, for her eightieth birthday in the United States House of Representatives. She died at Nathan Adelson Hospice in Las Vegas, Nevada, on December 19, 2019, at the age of 87.
