= Laverne Schroeder =

American politician (1933–2019)

Member of the Iowa House of Representatives
- In office 1967–1985

Personal details
- Born: April 14, 1933 near McClelland, Iowa, United States
- Died: December 20, 2019 (aged 86) Ankeny, Iowa
- Party: Republican
- Occupation: farmer

Laverne W. Schroeder (April 14, 1933 – December 20, 2019) was an American politician in the state of Iowa.

Schroeder was born near McClelland, Iowa. He is a veteran of the Korean War and is a farmer. He served in the Iowa House of Representatives from 1967 to 1985 as a Republican.
