= Fred Emmer =

Dutch news presenter (1934–2019)

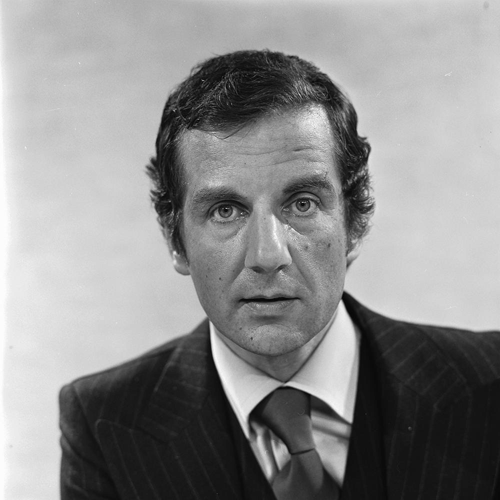
Fred Emmer in 1976

Freddy Emmer (23 August 1934 – 24 December 2019) was a Dutch news presenter for NTS and NOS. He was born in Amsterdam. Apart from TV shows, Emmer also published a book with erotic writings.

Emmer died on 24 December 2019 in Hilversum at the age of 85.
