= Roger Goossens =

Belgian field hockey player (1926–2019)

Personal information
- Nationality: Belgian
- Born: 7 December 1926 Brussels, Belgium
- Died: 21 December 2019 (aged 93)

Sport
- Sport: Field hockey

Roger Goossens (7 December 1926 – 21 December 2019) was a Belgian field hockey player. He competed at the 1948 Summer Olympics, the 1952 Summer Olympics, the 1956 Summer Olympics and the 1960 Summer Olympics.
