= Ashok Kalyanrao Tapkir =

Indian politician (c.1949–2019)

Maharashtra Legislative Assembly
- In office 1985–1990
- Preceded by: Motiram Pawar
- Succeeded by: Landge Dnyaneshwar Pandurang
- Constituency: Haveli

Personal details
- Born: c. 1949
- Died: 10 December 2019 (aged 70)
- Party: Indian National Congress

Ashok Kalyanrao Tapkir (c. 1949 – 10 December 2019) was an Indian politician from Maharashtra belonging to Indian National Congress. He was a legislator of the Maharashtra Legislative Assembly.

== Biography ==
Tapkir was elected as a legislator of the Maharashtra Legislative Assembly from Haveli in 1985 as an Indian National Congress candidate.

Tapkir died on 10 December 2019 at the age of 70.
