= Slaheddine Maaoui =

Tunisian politician and journalist (1950–2019)

Slaheddine Maaoui (20 July 1950 – 30 December 2019) was a Tunisian journalist and politician, who served as Minister of Tourism.

== Biography ==
He was born on 20 July 1950, in Kairouan. After studying primary education in Sfax and then in El Menzah, he went to Sadiki high school in Tunis and then began studying public law with a license from the Faculty of Law of the University of Tunis- He then assumed functions in the information sector for several years. Recruited by the newspaper La Presse de Tunisie in 1971, he quickly rose through the ranks, becoming deputy editor in 1974 and then editor in 1978. At the same time, he was chosen as a member of the International Information Commission, which operates under the leadership of the United Nations and brings together the most reputable newspapers. He also continues to provide local correspondence for Le Figaro. In 1986, he was elected as vice-president of the International Federation of Journalists.

He also chairs the board of directors of the New Printing, Press and Publishing Company, sits on the Higher Council for Communication and chairs the Tunisian Association of Newspaper Publishers. In March 1989, he was appointed director general of the Tunisian Radio and Television Establishment. He is also elected to the presidency of the Union of national radios and televisions of Africa and like member of the executive council of the Union of broadcasting of the Arab States.

In January 2007, he became director general of ASBU, a position he held following his election in December 2006 by the general assembly of ASBU for a four-year term. In 2015, having exhausted his two successive eight-year terms, he had to leave his post, but the ASBU board wished to continue to benefit from his skills and created specially for him a new advisory structure: the strategic planning group, where he was the President.

He joined the Democratic Constitutional Rally in 1987 and was part of its central committee while chairing the Habib-Thameur cell in Tunis. From February 1991 to March 1992, he assumed the functions of advisor to the President of the Republic, then those of director general of the Tunisian Agency for External Communication from February 1992 to January 1995. He was appointed head of the Ministry of Tourism, which he assumed from January 1995 to January 2001, then as Minister Delegate to the Prime Minister, responsible for Communication, Human Rights and Relations with the Chamber of Deputies, a position he held from February 2001 to May 2002. He was then appointed as ambassador to Saudi Arabia from November 2002 to December 2006.

Maaoui died of a heart attack on 30 December 2019, aged 69.
