= Stuart J. Knickerbocker =

American animator and cartoonist (1925–2019)

Stuart James Knickerbocker
- Born: May 10, 1925; Flint, Michigan, U.S.
- Died: December 14, 2019 (aged 94); Lansing, Michigan, U.S.
- Resting place: Great Lakes National Cemetery, Holly, Michigan, U.S.
- Education: Michigan State University
- Occupations: Animator, cartoonist
- Spouse: M. Ellen Piggott
- Children: 2 sons, 1 daughter

Stuart J. Knickerbocker (March 10, 1925 – December 14, 2019) was an American animator and magazine cartoonist. He worked for the Jam Handy Organization in Detroit, Portafilms in Drayton Plains, and the Bill Sandy Corporation in Troy.
