= Firoz Ghanty =

Mauritian painter (1952–2019)

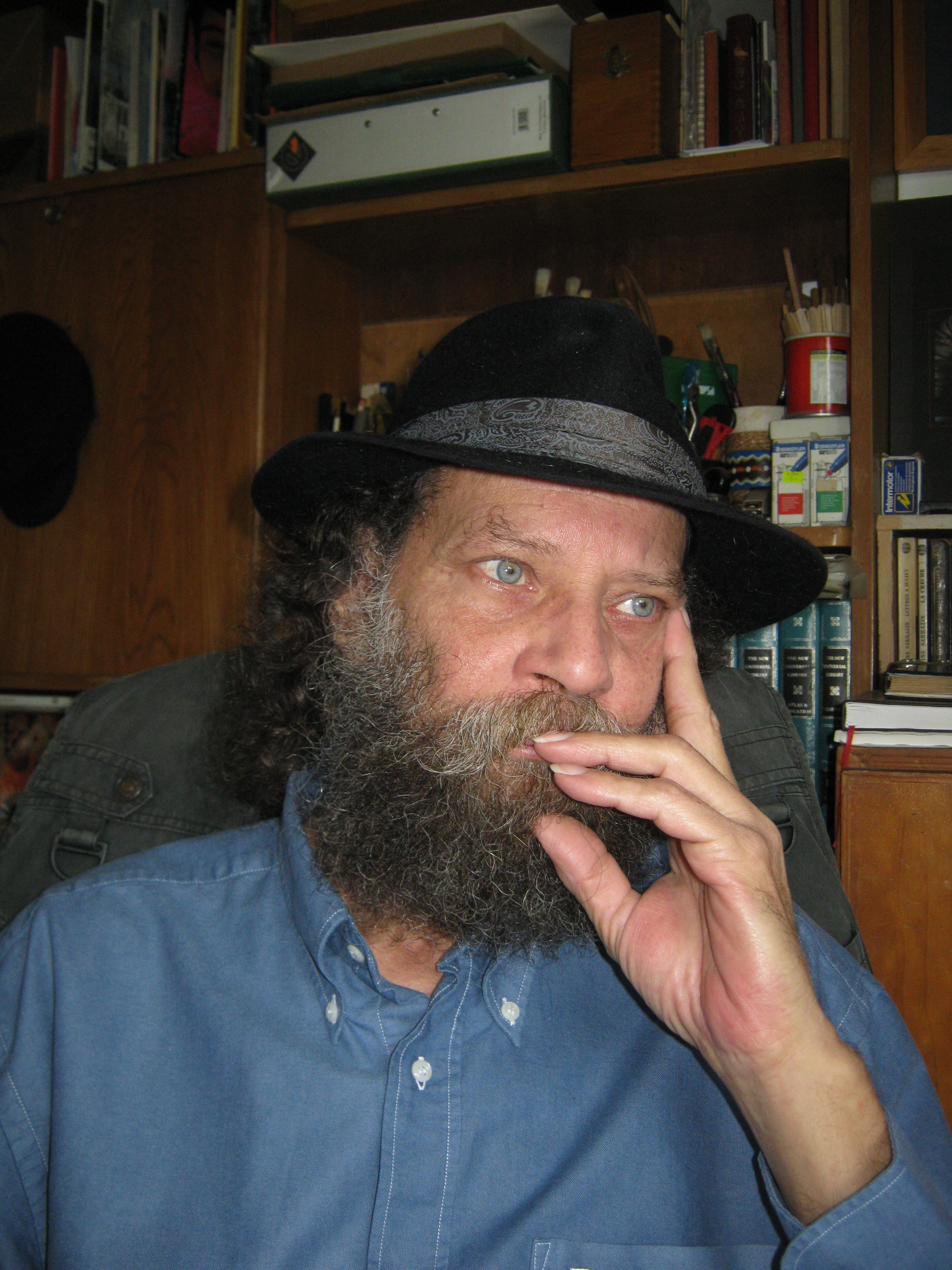
- Firoz Ghanty in 2012
- Born: 14 August 1952; Beau Bassin-Rose Hill, Mauritius
- Died: 3 December 2019 (aged 67); Moka, Mauritius
- Other name: Firoz Abdul Cader Ghanty
- Occupation: Painter

Firoz Abdul Cader Ghanty (14 August 1952 – 3 December 2019) was a Mauritian painter, poet, and activist.

== Biography ==
Ghanty was born in Mauritius to a Persian-Gujarati father and a French mother. He held Marxist-Leninist ideas, and his involvement in protests led to arrests in 1975 and 1981. He lived in France from 1984 to 1996. He contributed to the Arte Povera movement, and specialized in contemporary art.

Firoz Ghanty died on 3 December 2019 at Wellkin Hospital in Moka.

== Notable works ==
- "L’Île Maurice à Paris" (1986)
- "Grande kermesse populaire du Parti du Travail Suisse" (1986)
- "Les Plasticiens de l’Île Maurice" (1993)
- "Dix ans après" (1994)
- "Art actuel de Maurice" (1994)
- "Made in Mauritius" (1995)
- "Les Années Paris" (1996)
- "Papié" (1996)
- "Litra" (1997)
- "Poswar/Pochoirs" (1997)
- "1000 Rondins/Totem pu Lamemwar (1998)
- "Le Pont I" (2000)
- "Bridge II Pont III" (2000)
- "Encounters" (2001)
- "Autoportraits" (2001)
- "Le Pont III" (2002)
- "Sertifié Morisyin II" (2002)
- "After Tokyo" (2003)
- "Taureau-de Solstice en Equinoxe" (2007)
- "Mon Corps/Moi mis à Nu" (2008)
- "Striker" (2009)
- "Écritures Croisées" (2009)
- "Test Landing of the Dodo" (2010)
- "11e Foire internationale des Mascareignes" (2010)
- "FNB Joburg Art Fair" (2011)
- "Ruptures" (2011)
- "…Suite" (2012)
- "Prakzis" (2012)
