= Paula Grimaldi-Reardon =

American photographer (1954–2019)

Paula Grimaldi Reardon
- Born: October 17, 1954; Jersey City, New Jersey, US
- Died: December 3, 2019 (aged 65); North Brunswick, New Jersey

Paula Grimaldi-Reardon (born Paula Jeanne Frances Marie Grimaldi, October 17, 1954 – December 3, 2019) was an American photographer who primarily documented the motorcycle, tattoo, and outlaw subcultures. She was a self-taught photographer known for her black-and-white film images portraying the 1980s and 1990s counterculture.

== Life and career ==
Grimaldi-Reardon was born on October 17, 1954, in Jersey City, New Jersey, to the late Joseph Grimaldi and the late RosaRia (née Cascino) Grimaldi. Her parents moved the family, which also included Paula's brothers Michael and Joseph, to New Brunswick, New Jersey. The same year, she first picked up a camera and discovered her talent, which led to her eventual vocation of documentary photography. Five years later, the family moved again to North Brunswick, New Jersey, where Grimaldi-Reardon lived until her marriage to Jeff Miluszewski in 1973.

At the age of 22, Grimaldi-Reardon was introduced to the world of go-go bars, and shortly thereafter, she began to dance at various clubs near her home in Middlesex County, New Jersey. Her experiences during the 18 years she performed in go-go bars helped inform her subsequent photography work.

In the early 1980s, Grimaldi-Reardon began photographing the biker lifestyle, documenting parties, swap meets, motorcycle runs, and other events. She submitted photos from a swap meet to Biker Lifestyle magazine, using the pseudonym Pulsating Paula in a professional capacity for the first time. The photos were accepted, and she became a frequent, and popular, contributor for the next two decades. She also became a contributor to some of magazines of Paisano Publication, whose flagship was Easyriders Magazine.

Grimaldi-Reardon's subjects also included tattoo artists and their subjects, as well as the shows and exhibitions that supported the tattoo lifestyle, with her photography featured in Tattoo Magazine, the pre-eminent skin art publication of its time. History network used Grimaldi-Reardon's photographs in its series Outlaw Chronicles: Hells Angels which ran from August 18, 2015 to September 22, 2015. Her photography work continues to be featured in innumerable print publications, websites, blogs, and other media outlets.

Grimaldi-Reardon was a fixture as one of the key photographers at the NYC International Tattoo Convention, organized and managed by NYC Lower East Side photographer, historian, and author Clayton Patterson, who, along with artist and filmmaker Ari Roussimoff founded the Tattoo Society of New York. Grimaldi-Reardon’s photographs also showcased go-go dancers, gothic fantasy, and other alternative lifestyle milieus.

When Grimaldi-Reardon ended her photography assignments with magazines in the 1990s, she continued to utilize her photography skills by accepting work involving photo restorations, enhancements, and “then-and-now” photographic collages.

== Awards and appearances ==
For her photography, Grimaldi-Reardon was a winner of the inaugural New York Acker Awards in 2013. The Acker Awards, launched and named for Kathy Acker, was founded and financed by Alan Kaufman and Clayton Patterson. According to Clayton, the Acker awards are "… a way to bring recognition and honor to the creative individuals who inspired so much of what NYC represents and who have made, and continue to make, a significant contribution to our avant-garde culture".

Grimaldi-Reardon played a role as a go-go dancer in Ari Roussimoff's 1991 film Shadows in the City. She has also been highlighted as the subject in several magazine spreads, such as Tattoo Magazine where she was featured as the cover model with an inside spread, as well as Cheri, an adult magazine. Additionally, her photographic likeness was used to represent a Pleasure Artist as the 4 of Spades card in certified sexologist Annie Sprinkle's Post-Modern Pin-Ups Pleasure Activist Playing Cards.

== In popular culture ==
Two books regarding her photography and her life were published posthumously:

1. The first published in 2021, entitled "The World of Pulsating Paula: The Biker Lifestyle" contains some of her photographs from the late 1970s through the early 2000s, primarily black and white, with a few full color photographs.
2. The second published in 2022, entitled "The World of Pulsating Paula: Volume 2" contains her autobiography, some of her fiction writing, and some of her photographs.

Both books are a collaboration of her husband, Doug Reardon, and friend of Paula and Doug, author/editor Stu Segal.

== Personal life ==
Grimaldi-Reardon was married twice; her first marriage was to Jeff Miluszewski in 1973 and in 1996 ended in divorce. She wed Douglas Reardon later that year, and remained married to him until her death in 2019. Grimaldi-Reardon has no children.

Her initial bout with breast cancer occurred in the early 1990s, receded with treatment, and reappeared in 2003, again receding for nearly a decade. In 2012, however, it metastasized and progressed to stage IV, resulting in her death in 2019.
