= Lu Shixin =

Chinese cancer pathologist (1929–2019)

Lu Shixin (Chinese: 陆士新; 12 December 1929 – 6 December 2019) was a Chinese cancer pathologist. He served as President of the Tumour Institute of the Chinese Academy of Medical Sciences and was elected an academician of the Chinese Academy of Sciences in 1997.

== Biography ==
Lu was born on 12 December 1929 in Yancheng, Jiangsu, Republic of China. He studied at Dalian Medical University from 1951 to 1956. He subsequently went to Romania to study at the University of Medicine and Pharmacy Bucharest, earning an associate doctor degree in 1961.

After returning to China, he worked as a researcher at the Institute of Experimental Medicine of the Chinese Academy of Medical Sciences (CAMS) and then at the Tumour Institute and Tumour Hospital of the CAMS. From 1988 he served as President of the Tumour Institute.

Lu was a pioneer in molecular cancer pathology in China. He showed that nitrosamines cause esophagus cancer, and discovered a new carcinogenic nitrosamine, N-3-methylbutyl-N-1-methylacetonylnitrosamine (MAMBNA), isolated from the gastric fluid of cancer patients. He studied the molecular mechanism of the carcinogenesis of esophagus cancer, stem cells of the cancer, and its chemical prevention.

He won the National Science Congress Award in 1978, the State Natural Science Award (Third Class) in 1988, and the State Science and Technology Progress Award (Third Class) in 1996. He was elected an academician of the Chinese Academy of Sciences in 1997.

Lu died on 6 December 2019 in Beijing, aged 89.
