= Filmkrönikan =

Swedish television program

Broadcast from 1956 (except 1992–1994), Filmkrönikan was Sweden's longest-running television program. It was broadcast on Sveriges Television.

== History ==
Arne Weise was the first host but was replaced after just 4 episodes by Gunnar Oldin. In 1963, Nils Petter Sundgren took over and would remain host for 28 years.

In 1991, Sundgren was replaced by the duo of Ulrika Knutson and Sven Hugo Pehrsson. A year later the show was dropped, but it was revived in 1994 with Gunnar Rehlin as host. He was replaced in 1998 by John Carlsson and a trio of female critics including Helena von Zweigbergk, Jannike Åhlund, and Ulrika Knutson. In 2000 the faces of the show changed again, with Sara Wennerblom as host and Fredrik Sahlin as the main critic.

In 2003, Orvar Säfström took over as host and sole critic. He was later joined by co-host/critic Emma Gray in 2004. Säfström stayed for 7 seasons.

The show was revamped for the 2006/2007 season with Helena von Zweigbergk as the new main host. She left the position in the spring of 2007. The show was once again reworked, now with Andrea Reuter and Navid Modiri hosting. Both of these versions met with harsh criticism and dwindling ratings and the show was permanently canceled in 2008.
