= Jan de Laval =

Swedish actor and director (1948–2019)

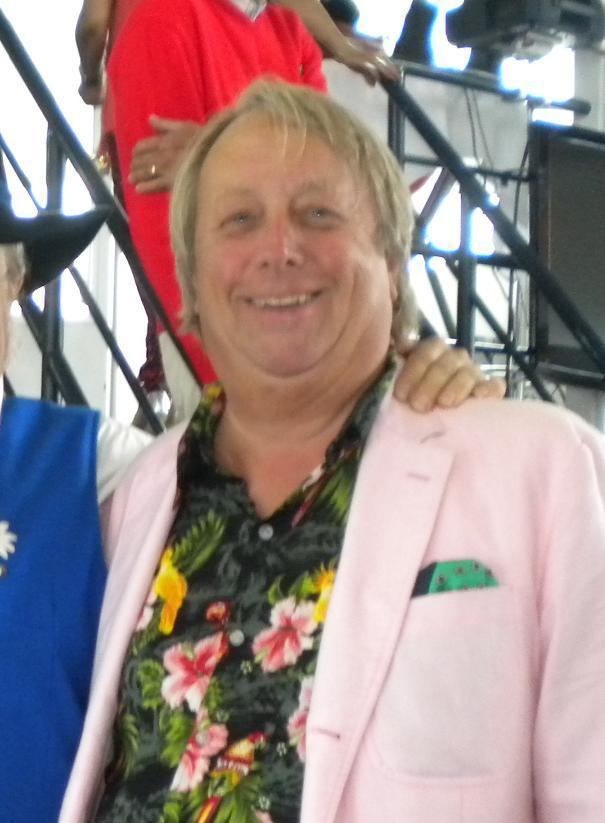
Jan de Laval in 2011

Jan Patrik de Laval (28 March 1948 – 19 December 2019) was a Swedish actor and director. He was born in Västrum.

== Filmography ==
- 1968 – Alkestis
- 1969 – Den girige
- 1969 – Kameleonterna
- 1979 – Selambs (TV-series)
- 1979 – Mor gifter sig (TV-series)
- 1987 – Komedianter
- 1996 – Skilda världar (TV-series)
- 1997 – Rederiet (TV-series)
