= Lin Zonghu =

Chinese thermal engineer and professor (1933–2019)

Lin Zonghu (Chinese: 林宗虎; 13 May 1933 – 21 December 2019) was a Chinese thermal engineer and professor at Xi'an Jiaotong University. Known for the "Lin formula" which is widely used in two-phase flow measurements, he was elected an academician of the Chinese Academy of Engineering.

== Early life ==
Lin was born on 13 May 1933 in Huzhou, Zhejiang, Republic of China. When the Second Sino-Japanese War broke out in 1937, his family sought refuge in the Shanghai International Settlement.

== Education and career ==
In 1951, Lin tested into the mechanical engineering department of Shanghai Jiao Tong University. When Chen Xuejun established China's first university major in boilers, Lin entered the program as the country's first graduate student in the field. He completed his graduate studies in 1957 and joined the faculty of the university.

In 1957, part of Shanghai Jiao Tong University was relocated to Xi'an in western China to form Xi'an Jiaotong University. Lin followed his advisor Chen Xuejun and most of the mechanical engineering department and moved to Xi'an, where he spent most of his career. A year later, he led a team at Shanghai Boiler Factory to develop China's first once-through boiler.

In the late 1970s and early 1980s, Lin spent three years researching gas-liquid two-phase flow measurements, and published his findings in the International Journal of Multiphase Flow in 1982. His research established the "Lin formula" which has been widely used in two-phase flow measurements.

From 1980 to 1982 Lin was a visiting professor at the University of Miami in the United States. He became a full professor of Xi'an Jiaotong University in 1985 and a doctoral advisor in 1990. He advised more than 50 graduate students, including Guo Liejin, an academician of the Chinese Academy of Sciences.

In 1991 Lin was awarded a special pension by the Chinese government for distinguished academics. He was elected an academician of the Chinese Academy of Engineering in 1995. He was awarded the State Natural Science Award (Third Class), the State Science and Technology Progress Award (Second Class), and nine minister- and provincial-level science and technology prizes.

== Death ==
Lin died on 21 December 2019 in Xi'an, aged 86.
