= Alan Doble =

Australian cricketer (1942–2019)

Personal information
- Born: 27 December 1942; Melbourne, Australia
- Died: 15 December 2019 (aged 76)

Domestic team information
- Years: Team
- 1964-1966: Victoria
- Source: Cricinfo, 4 December 2015

Alan Doble (27 December 1942 – 15 December 2019) was an Australian cricketer. He played four first-class cricket matches for Victoria between 1964 and 1966.

== See also ==
- List of Victoria first-class cricketers
