= Rob Tillard =

English cricketer (1924–2019)

Personal information
- Full name: John Robert Tillard
- Born: 26 May 1924; Kensington, London, England
- Died: 16 December 2019 (aged 95)
- Batting: Right-handed

Domestic team information
- Years: Team
- 1949: Sussex

Career statistics
Competition	First-class
Matches	1
Runs scored	3
Batting average	1.50
100s/50s	–/–
Top score	3
Balls bowled	–
Wickets	–
Bowling average	–
5 wickets in innings	–
10 wickets in match	–
Best bowling	–
Catches/stumpings	–/–
- Source: Cricinfo, 1 December 2011

John Robert Tillard (26 May 1924 – 16 December 2019) was an English cricketer. Tillard was a right-handed batsman.

== Early life ==
The younger son of Brigadier John Arthur Stuart Tillard (1889–1975), OBE, MC, of The Hooke, Chailey, Sussex, who served with the Royal Corps of Signals, and his wife Margaret Penelope, daughter of John Blencowe, of Chailey, Sussex, Tillard was born in Kensington, London in May 1924. Both parents were of landed gentry families, the Tillards being of The Holme, Godmanchester, Huntingdonshire.

Tillard was educated at Winchester College and the University of Oxford.

== Military and cricket career ==
Tillard was enlisted into the British Army as an Emergency Commission in the King's Royal Rifle Corps in 1943. He held the rank of 2nd lieutenant throughout World War II, following the war he was promoted to lieutenant in April 1947, Tillard made a single first-class cricket appearance for Sussex against Oxford University at the University Parks in 1949. In Sussex's first-innings, he was dismissed for 3 runs by Abdul Kardar, while in their second-innings he was dismissed for a duck by George Chesterton. Oxford University won the match by an innings and 9 runs. This was his only major appearance for Sussex. By 1951, he was promoted to captain, while still serving at this time in the King's Royal Rifle Corps. He continued to serve in the Army until at least 1957, the year in which he played for the British Army cricket team against Oxford University, though the match wasn't rated as first-class.

== Skiing ==
Tillard was a ski representative for the Ski Club of Great Britain for 10 years, and their General-Secretary from 1969-1971. He set up an agency which was to place over 7000 British workers in jobs in the Alps, and published ski guides to several Alpine resorts. In 2000 he authored the book "Ski Story: The Decline and Renaissance of the Ski Club of Great Britain 1950-2000" .

== Personal life ==
Aged 94, Tillard was involved in a dispute with church authorities over their intention to remove Victorian pews from St Peter's Church, Chailey, with which the Tillard and Blencowe families were long associated; the alterations were approved, and he was fined £3,000 for the cost of legal proceedings. He died after a short illness in December 2019 at the age of 95, survived by his widow Ann.
