= Barry Sadler (footballer) =

Australian rules footballer

Personal information
- Full name: Barry Linton Sadler
- Born: 3 July 1940
- Died: 2 December 2019 (aged 79)
- Original team: Longwarry
- Height: 189 cm (6 ft 2 in)
- Weight: 88 kg (194 lb)

Playing career^{1}
Years	Club	Games (Goals)
1963	Fitzroy	2 (0)
- ^{1} Playing statistics correct to the end of 1963.

Barry Linton Sadler (3 July 1940 – 2 December 2019) was an Australian rules footballer who played for the Fitzroy Football Club in the Victorian Football League (VFL).
