= Ellen Shub =

American photojournalist (1946–2019)

- Born: January 1, 1946; New Jersey, U.S.
- Died: December 18, 2019 (aged 73)
- Education: Harvard Graduate School of Education (MEd)
- Occupation: photojournalist
- Children: 1
- Website: ellenshub.photoshelter.com

Ellen Shub (January 1, 1946 – December 18, 2019) was an American photojournalist focusing on human rights and social justice issues.

== Early life and education ==
Shub was born in New Jersey to Ruth and George Shub. She studied at University of Rochester, Annenberg School for Communication at the University of Pennsylvania, and Carpenter Center for the Visual Arts. Shub earned an M.Ed. from the Harvard Graduate School of Education.

== Career ==
Shub worked as a media producer in television programming in the Boston area before becoming a full-time freelance photojournalist in the 1980s. Shub's photographs appeared feminist newspapers, gay and lesbian newspapers, and cities' weeklies. Shub attended social protests from the early 1970s through 2018 and many of her photographs feature protest signs. Her photographs of protest signs have appeared in The New Yorker, the National Library of Medicine, Our Bodies Ourselves, and Frontiers: A Journal of Women Studies. She has photographed activists such as Frances Crowe, Larry Kramer, the Dalai Lama, and Rosa Parks. At gallery showings, she would juxtapose images of famous people with lesser-known or unknown activists, giving each subject an equal importance or weight.

Shub worked as a grants administrator and photographer for the Institute of Coaching at McLean Hospital in Belmont, Massachusetts during the last decade of her life.

== Personal life ==
Shub and her longtime partner Kathy J. Seltzer had one son.
