= Chico Teixeira =

Brazilian screenwriter and film director (1958–2019)

- Born: 14 June 1958; Rio de Janeiro, Brazil
- Died: 28 December 2019 (aged 61); São Paulo, Brazil
- Occupation: Filmmaker

Chico Teixeira (14 June 1958 – 28 December 2019) was a Brazilian documentarian, screenwriter and film director.

== Life and career ==
Born in Rio de Janeiro, Teixeira graduated in economy, and in the second half of the 1980s started working on television, directing the Rede Manchete show Conexão Nacional. Starting from 1989, he directed several documentary films, winning the award for best director at the 1995 Festival de Gramado for Criaturas que nasciam em segredo.

He made his narrative feature film debut in 2007 with Alice's House, which premiered at the 65th Berlin International Film Festival and was awarded the Grand Prix at the Cabourg Film Festival. His following film Absence won four awards at the Festival de Gramado including best film.

Teixeira died of lung cancer on 28 December 2019, at the age of 61.
