= Sydney Leach =

British scientist (1924–2019)

Sydney Leach FRS (11 April 1924 – 24 December 2019) was a British scientist based in France whose research areas included the fields of spectroscopy, photophysics and photochemistry. His work studying molecular ions led to new areas of interest, including planetary and atmospheric science, as well as the newly developing field of astrobiology.

His scientific career was based in Paris, including his founding Directorship at Laboratoire de Photophysique Moléculaire Orsay, and his later move to L'Observatoire de Meudon where he was based for the remainder of his career.

Leach was elected Fellow of the Royal Society in 1993.
