= Yiannis Papadimitriou =

Greek lawyer and politician (1912–2019)

Yiannis Papadimitriou (29 March 1912 – 25 December 2019) was a Greek lawyer and politician who served as a Member of Parliament. He was elected in 1956, 1958, 1961, 1963 and 1964. He died at the age of 107 in December 2019 and at the time of his death he was the oldest living former member of the Greek Parliament.
