= Damiri Mahmud =

Indonesian writer (1945–2019)

- Born: January 17, 1945; Hamparan Perak, Deli Serdang Regency, North Sumatra, Indonesia
- Died: December 30, 2019 (aged 74); Deli Serdang Regency, North Sumatra, Indonesia
- Education: Ibtidaiyah, Jalan Amaliun; SMEP Jalan Sindoro, Medan; Widyasana High School, Medan
- Occupations: Writer; Poet; Writer for newspapers and magazines
- Known for: Poetry; folklore adaptations
- Notable work: Teka-Teki; Mata; Apresiasi Puisi (Appreciation of Poetry); Damai di Bumi: Kumpulan Sajak

Damiri Mahmud (17 January 1945 – 30 December 2019) was an Indonesian writer. He also wrote poetry and various articles for newspapers and magazines. His writings in the form of cultural, political, and religious articles, appeared in various dailies and magazines in Indonesia and Malaysia, among others: Buana News, Pelita, Kompas, Republika, People's Thoughts, Analysis, Alert, Free, People's Mind, Lampung Post, Media Indonesia, Community Flag, Sovereign, Horison, Base, Council for Literature and Daily News (Malaysia).

== Career ==
His work in the literary world of Medan began in 1969 after seven short stories were published in the magazine "Stars, Sport, and Film". His short stories, among others, were titled Ronggeng, Old Bloody Old Injury Again, and News from the Sea. His short story Mata was later published in the Jakarta Horison magazine in 1970. Besides writing modern literary works, Damiri Mahmud also wrote folklore. He rewrote existing folklore with a new version. His folktale entitled Father′s Testament was published by Firma Hasmar, Medan in 1976. He also received an award from the North Sumatra Library in 1978 for his folklore, entitled Reply to Budi. In addition, he has also produced a novel entitled Teka-Teki, published by Marwilis Publisher, Selangor, Malaysia in 1988. In the year 2000, 59 of his poems were included in a collection entitled Damai di Bumi published by the North Sumatra Deparsenibud Regional Office and Hotel Garuda Plaza, Medan.

== Works ==
- Wasiat Ayah Firma Hasmar, Medan (1976)
- Membalas Budi (1978)
- Titian Laut I Language and Literature Council, Kuala Lumpur (1982)
- Muara Satu (1984)
- Nafas Islam dalam Sastra Indonesia (1984)
- Titian Laut II Language and Literature Council, Kuala Lumpur (1986)
- Teka-Teki Marwilis Publisher, Malaysia (1988)
- Muara Dua Firma Maju Medan (1989)
- Titian Laut III Language and Literature Council, Kuala Lumpur (1991)
- Damai di Bumi: Kumpulan Sajak Deparsenibud, North Sumatra (2000)
- Tonggak
- Bosnia Kita
- Kontroversi Al-Quran Berwajah Puisi
- Esensi dan Dinamika
- Perisa
- Ensiklopedia Sejarah dan Kebudayaan Melayu
- Daun-daun Sejarah (2000)
- Beri Kami Satu Bentuk Hidup Bersahaja (2000)
- Apresiasi puisi: suara kepenyairan sastrawan Medan (2012)
- Menafsir Kembali Amir Hamzah North Sumatra Library Board, 2013 and Ombak (2017)
- Rumah Tersembunyi Chairil Anwar Unimed Press (2014) and Ombak (2018)
- Patung Badan Perpustakaan Sumatera Utara (2018)
- Halakah Panggang Obelia Publisher (2018)
- Menjadi Tanah Obelia Publisher (2019)

=== Poetry ===
- Damai di Bumi: Kumpulan Sajak Deparsenibud, North Sumatra (2000)
