= Alice's House (film) =

- Film poster
- Directed by: Chico Teixeira
- Written by: Chico Teixeira
- Starring: Carla Ribas
- Cinematography: Mauro Pinheiro Jr.
- Edited by: Vânia Debs
- Release date: 2007
- Country: Brazil

Alice's House (Portuguese: A Casa de Alice) is a 2007 Brazilian drama film directed by Chico Teixeira, at his feature film debut. The film premiered at the Panorama section of the 65th Berlin International Film Festival. It was awarded the Grand Prix at the Cabourg Film Festival.

== Cast ==
- Carla Ribas as Alice
- Zecarlos Machado as Lindomar
- Luciano Quirino as Nilson
- Vinicius Zinn as Luc as
- Claudio Jaborandy as Ivanildo
- Berta Zemel as Dona Jacira
- Ricardo Vilaça as Edinho
- Felipe Massuia as Junior
- Mariana Leighton as Thais
- Renata Zhaneta as Carmem

== Reception ==
On Rotten Tomatoes, the film has an approval rating of 89% based on 36 reviews. The New York Times described the film as "simultaneously delicate and earthy".
