= Roz Joseph =

American photographer (1926–2019)

- Born: Rosalind Malamud; June 30, 1926; The Bronx, New York City, U.S.
- Died: December 25, 2019; San Francisco, California, U.S.
- Known for: Photography
- Spouse: Elliott Joseph

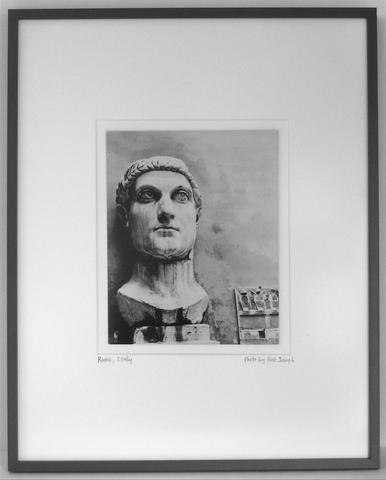
1960s, Rome, Italy, Photograph Mounted on Board.

Roz Joseph (June 30, 1926 – December 25, 2019) was an American photographer. She took black-and-white photographs of New York City and color photographs of the local architecture and drag scene of San Francisco, California.

== Photography career ==
Joseph took photographs during her travels in Europe and North Africa, only to return to New York City, where she specialized in black-and-white images. Shortly after winning the grand prize in a photo competition run by the Saturday Review in 1963, Joseph returned to Europe. She also won the Purchase Award from the Concord Community Arts Department of the National Photography Competition.

Joseph relocated to San Francisco in 1970, where she mainly took color photographs of the local architecture and drag queens. In 1991, she provided all the illustrations for Details: The Architect's Art, an art book by Sally Byrne Woodbridge that analyzes the decorative details of San Francisco buildings from the Victorian period to the 1940s.

In the 1970s and 1980s, Joseph's photographs were exhibited at the San Francisco Art Institute, the UCR/California Museum of Photography, Stanford University's Iris & B. Gerald Cantor Center for Visual Arts, the Montalvo Arts Center, the Coos Art Museum in Oregon, and the Center for Photography at Woodstock in New York.

Joseph's series of images of drag queens produced in 1975–1978 received several exhibitions in the 1970s, then was the subject of a one-artist show, "Reigning Queens: The Lost Photos of Roz Joseph," at the GLBT Historical Society Museum in San Francisco in 2015–2016. Joseph had donated the photographs, the drafts of an unpublished book on the series and related professional records to the archives of the society in two lots in 2010 and 2016.

== Personal life ==
Joseph was born in 1926 in the Bronx, New York. She graduated from the City College of New York in 1947 with a bachelor's degree in education and subsequently took art and photography classes there.

Joseph married Elliott Joseph in 1948. They resided in Paris, in New York and finally in the Russian Hill neighborhood of San Francisco, California. Roz Joseph died of atherosclerotic cardiovascular disease at her home on December 25, 2019.

== Works ==
- Joseph, Roz; Woodbridge, Sally B. (1991). Details: The Architect's Art. San Francisco, California: Chronicle Books. ISBN 9780877017479. OCLC 959096964.
