= William B. Pratt =

American politician and physician (1935–2019)

Member of the New Mexico House of Representatives from the 27th district
- In office 2018 – December 25, 2019
- Preceded by: Larry Larrañaga
- Succeeded by: Marian Matthews

Personal details
- Born: February 3, 1935 Camden, New Jersey, U.S.
- Died: December 25, 2019 (aged 84) Albuquerque, New Mexico, U.S.
- Party: Democratic
- Education: Wesleyan University (BS); Thomas Jefferson University (MD)
- Profession: Physician

William B. Pratt (February 3, 1935 – December 25, 2019) was an American physician and politician who served as a member of the New Mexico House of Representatives from 2018 until his death in 2019.

== Early life and education ==
Pratt was born in Camden, New Jersey. He received his bachelor's degree from Wesleyan University in 1957 and his medical degree from Jefferson Medical College in 1961.

== Career ==
Pratt practiced medicine in West Reading, Pennsylvania and in Albuquerque, New Mexico; he was an orthopedic surgeon. Pratt served in the New Mexico House of Representatives in 2018 and 2019. He was a Democrat.
