= Chen Xingbi =

Chinese electronics engineer (1931–2019)

- 陈星弼
- Born: 28 January 1931; Shanghai, China
- Died: 4 December 2019 (aged 88); Chengdu, Sichuan, China
- Education: Tongji University
- Known for: Invention of superjunction
- Awards: ISPSD Pioneer Award (2015); ISPSD Hall of Fame (2019)
- Scientific career
- Fields: Power semiconductor devices
- Workplaces: University of Electronic Science and Technology of China

Chen Xingbi (Chinese: 陈星弼; 28 January 1931 – 4 December 2019) was a Chinese electronics engineer and professor at the University of Electronic Science and Technology of China. Known for his invention of superjunction power semiconductor devices, he was elected an academician of the Chinese Academy of Sciences and a life fellow of the Institute of Electrical and Electronics Engineers (IEEE). He was inducted into IEEE's ISPSD Hall of Fame in 2019.

== Early life and education ==
Chen was born on 28 January 1931 in Shanghai, Republic of China, with his ancestral home in Pujiang County, Zhejiang. His father, Chen Dezheng (陈德徵), was a Kuomintang politician who was dismissed for offending Chiang Kai-shek. His mother, Xu Hemei (徐呵梅), studied literature at Shanghai University.

Chen entered primary school at the age of only three. When he was six, the Second Sino-Japanese War broke out and the Japanese attacked Shanghai. Chen's family fled the city for Chongqing, China's wartime capital. As a result of the Japanese bombing of Chongqing, the family fled again to the countryside in Hechuan, where he completed his primary and middle school education under harsh conditions.

After the end of the Second World War, Chen's family returned to Shanghai, where he studied at Jingye High School and was admitted to the Department of Electrical Engineering of Tongji University with a scholarship.

== Career ==
Upon graduation from Tongji University in 1952, Chen was assigned to teach at the Department of Electrical Engineering of Xiamen University. A year later, he was transferred to the faculty of radio electronics at Nanjing Institute of Technology (now Southeast University).

In 1956, Chen furthered his studies at the Institute of Applied Physics of the Chinese Academy of Sciences, where he researched semiconductors for two and half years. He joined the faculty of the newly established University of Electronic Science and Technology of China (UESTC) in Chengdu in 1959.

During the Cultural Revolution (1966–1976), Chen was persecuted because of his family's Kuomintang background and performed manual labour at a May Seventh Cadre School. After the end of the period he went to the United States in 1980 as a visiting scholar at Ohio State University and the University of California, Berkeley.

Upon returning to China in 1983, Chen was appointed a department chair at UESTC. He soon established the Institute of Microelectronics at the university and focused his research on MOSFET and power semiconductor devices. He also taught as a visiting professor at the University of Toronto in Canada and the University of Wales Swansea.

Chen died on 4 December 2019 in Chengdu, aged 88.

== Contributions and honours ==
Chen was a leading expert on power semiconductor devices in China, known for his invention of superjunction, for which he was granted a US patent in 1993. He also developed China's first VDMOS, LDMOS, insulated-gate bipolar transistor (IGBT), and other semiconductor devices. He published more than 200 research papers and held over 40 patents in China, the United States, and other countries.

He was elected an academician of the Chinese Academy of Sciences in 1999 and a life fellow of the Institute of Electrical and Electronics Engineers (IEEE) in 2019. In 2015, he won the Pioneer Award from IEEE's International Symposium on Power Semiconductor Devices and ICs (ISPSD), the first awardee from the Asia-Pacific region. In May 2019, he was inducted into the ISPSD Hall of Fame "for contributions to superjunction power semiconductor devices".
