= Wei Xinghua =

Chinese economist and educator (1925–2019)

- Simplified Chinese: 卫兴华
- Traditional Chinese: 衛興華
Transcriptions
Standard Mandarin
- Hanyu Pinyin: Wèi Xìnghuá
- IPA: [wêɪ ɕîŋ.xwǎ]

Wei Xinghua (Chinese: 卫兴华; October 1925 – 6 December 2019) was a Chinese economist and educator. He specialized in the study of capital and contributed to the "sinicization" of Marxist political economy. He served as professor and chair of the Department of Economics of Renmin University of China and was awarded the national honorary title of "People's Educator" in 2019.

== Biography ==
Wei was born October 1925 into a peasant family in Wutai County, Shanxi, Republic of China, and grew up during the Second Sino-Japanese War. He joined the underground Communist movement in 1946 and became a member of the Chinese Communist Party a year later. He and two colleagues were once arrested by the Kuomintang government, but were released due to lack of evidence. He subsequently fled to Beijing, whereas his two colleagues were later rearrested and executed.

Wei studied at North China University (later renamed as Renmin University of China). Upon graduating from Renmin University's graduate program in economics in 1952, he stayed at the university as a faculty member. He later became professor and chair of Renmin University's economics department. He specialized in the study of capital and was credited for his contributions to the "sinicization of Marxist political economy". In 1986, he advocated giving enterprises more freedom to determine their own objectives, which won the support of many other economists.

Wei published more than 40 books and over 1000 research papers and other articles. He was the chief editor of the textbook Principles of Political Economy (政治经济学原理), one of the most widely used textbooks in China. He proposed influential theories regarding the commodity economy and multiple elements of productivity. He was twice awarded the Sun Yefang Economics Prize for Outstanding Research Papers. Although Chinese media often described him as an "authority" or "master" in economics, he rejected such accolades and proclaimed that China did not have any world-class "authority" or "master" in economics.

During the celebrations for the 70th anniversary of the People's Republic of China, President Xi Jinping awarded Wei the National Honorary Title of "People's Educator" on 29 September 2019, although Wei was unable to attend the award ceremony due to poor health.

Wei died on 6 December 2019 in Beijing, aged 94.
