= Anna Manel·la =

Catalan sculptor and painter (1950–2019)

- from a 2018 video
- Born: 1 June 1950; Olot
- Died: 11 December 2019 (aged 69)
- Known for: sculpture

Anna Manel·la or Anna Manel·la i Llinàs (1 June 1950 – 11 December 2019) was a Spanish and Catalan sculptor and painter. She was known for her figures representing lost childhood. In 2022, the Museu de la Garrotxa devoted a monographic exhibition to her work: "If I could. Anna Manel·la (1950-2019)." Also in 2022, a group of friends published the book Anna Manel·la. La dona i el mur, which is a compilation of texts discussing the artist's life and works.

== Life ==
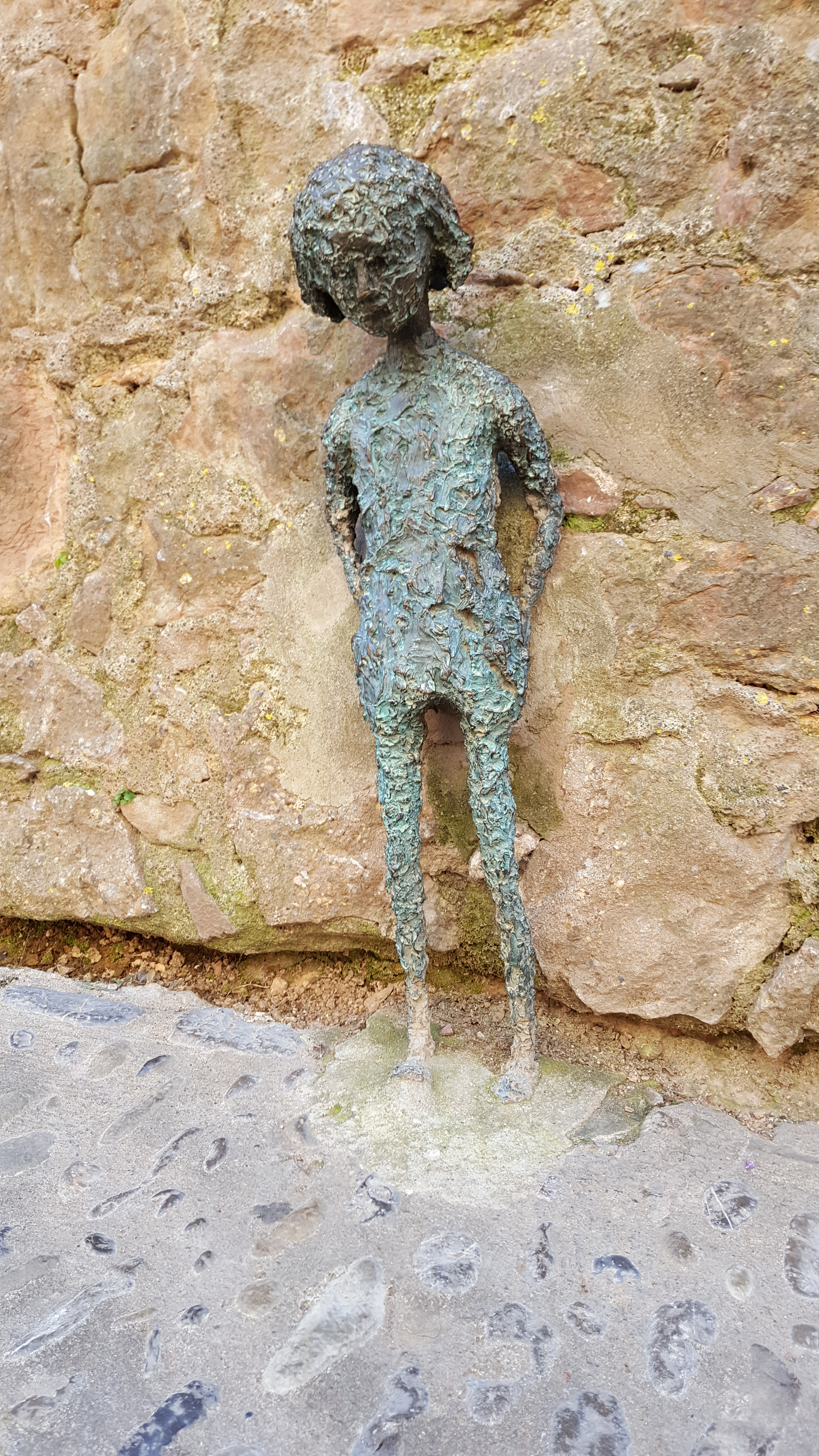
"Secrets", Santa Pau, Garrotxa

Manel·la was born in Olot in 1950. She attended Francesc Ferrer Private Elementary School before her secondary education at the Cor de Maria de Olot College of Nuns. She studied sculpture, drawing and painting at Barcelona' s La Llotja Art College. Her postgraduate studies were at the Art Academy of Olot and the art workshop "Marzo Mart" in the coastal town of Sant Feliu de Guíxols, where she developed her engraving skills.

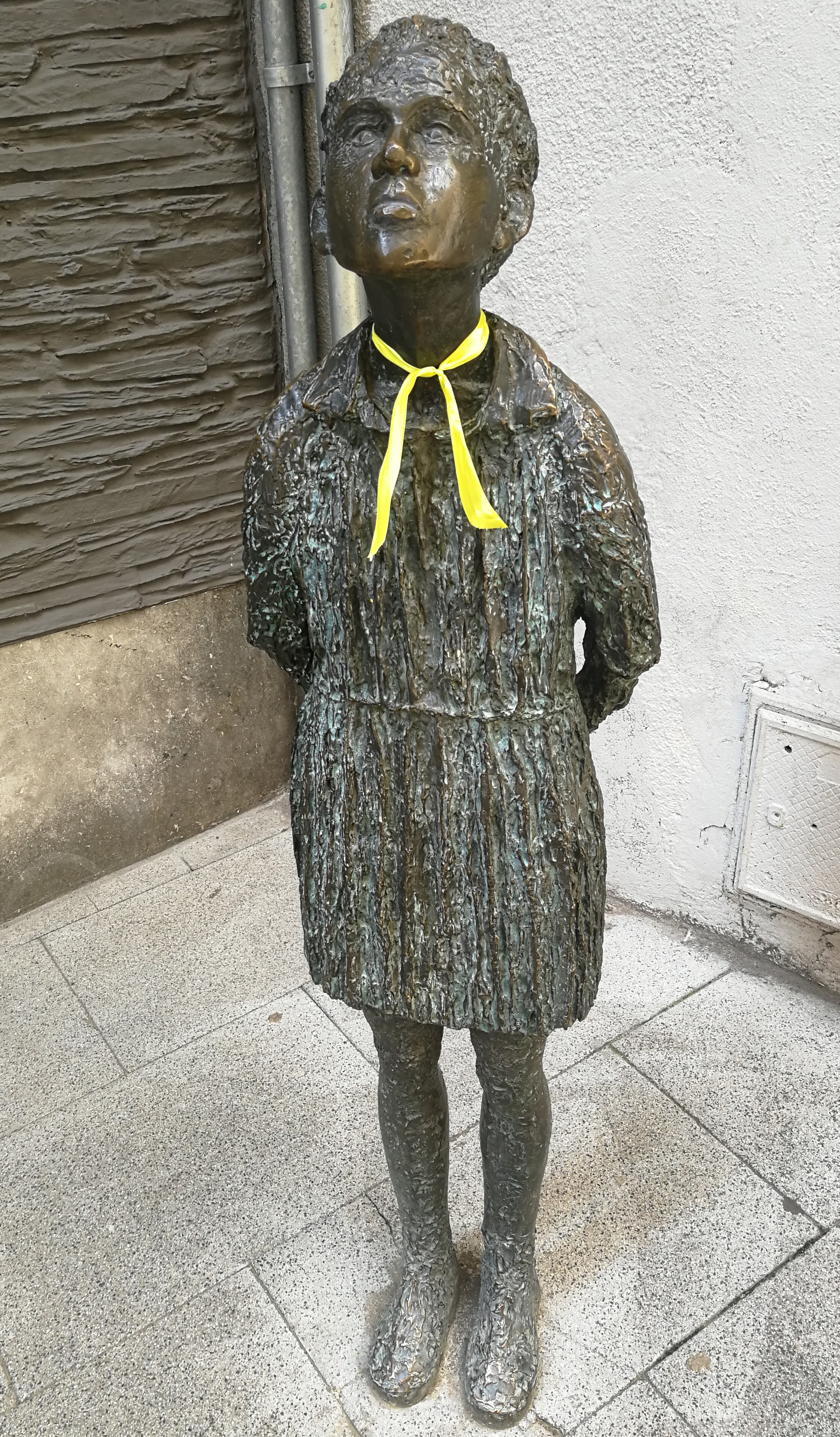
"Sense Luna"

The first exhibitions of Anna Manel·la's work took place in 1981 and 1982 in Olot and 1984 in Vic. After 1984, Manel·la worked intensively and exhibited extensively. In 1985 she participated in the 4th Autumn Salon of Barcelona. The same year she participated in the Art Exhibition of the Diputació de Girona. In 1986 she participated in the second Mostra de Girona. Manel·la participated in group and solo exhibitions in Catalonia France, Germany, Sweden and Italy. She is known for her sculpture and her paintings.

In 1986 she received a grant from the Generalitat de Catalunya for the visual arts.

She died on 11 December 2019.

== Sculptures include ==
- "Mont" in Cervaro, Italy, 1990
- "Secrets" in Santa Pau, Garrotxa, 1993
- "Without Moon" in Olot, 1993
- "Passes" in Marola, Italy, 1994
- "The Island of the Dead" in Besalú, Garrotxa 1994
- "Farewell" to Salt, Gironés 1997
- "Infinite" in Sant Boi de Llobregat, 2001

== Sources ==
- Vv.Aa., Anna Manel·la. La dona i el mur, Ajuntament d'Olot, 2022. ISBN 978-84-947494-7-6

== External Sources ==
- Cotlection Art Gallery Anna Manel·la
- Short documentary: Anna Manel·la: retrat d'una mirada (portrait of a gaze)
- Fons d'art Diputació de Girona
- Vídeo by Olot Cultura about exhibition: "Si jo pogués. Anna Manel·la (1950-2019)" (If I could)
