= Tessa Temata =

New Zealand diplomat and lawyer (c.1967–2019)

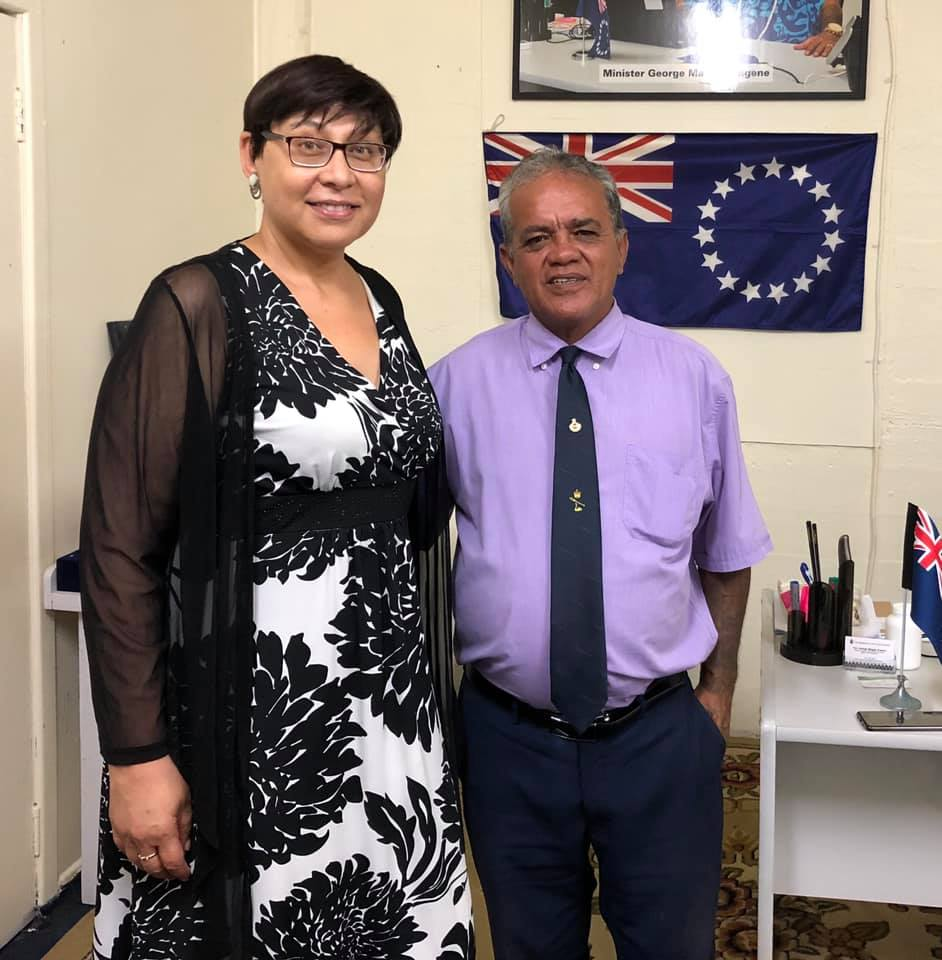
- Tessa Temata in 2019.

High Commissioner of New Zealand to the Cook Islands
- In office February 2019 – 8 December 2019
- Preceded by: Peter Marshall
- Succeeded by: TBD

Personal details
- Born: c. 1967 Taranaki, New Zealand
- Died: 8 December 2019 (aged 52) Palmerston North, New Zealand

Tessa Temata (c. 1967 – 8 December 2019) was a New Zealand career diplomat and lawyer who served as High Commissioner to the Cook Islands from February 2019 until her death in December 2019. Temata was the first person of Cook Islander descent to serve as New Zealand High Commissioner to the Cook Islands, as well as the first female High Commissioner of Pasifika descent to be posted anywhere in Oceania. Prior to her appointment as High Commissioner, Temata had served as a diplomat in Indonesia, Papua New Guinea, Kiribati, and Niue.

== Biography ==
Temata was born and raised in Taranaki, New Zealand. Her father, Tia Toa Anapou Temata, came from Mauke, an archipelago in the southern Cook Islands. Temata's paternal family can trace its ancestry to Uke Ariki of Mauke through his eldest daughter. Her mother, Jane Crichton, was originally from Togafuafua in Samoa.

Temata obtained a both a Bachelor of Law and a Bachelor of Arts degree in history and international politics from Victoria University of Wellington.

Temata joined the Ministry of Foreign Affairs and Trade in 1992. She served in the foreign ministry for more than twenty-five years from 1992 until her death in 2019. Her postings included Indonesia, Papua New Guinea, Kiribati and Niue. Additionally, Temata held positions as the Deputy High Commissioner of New Zealand to Papua New Guinea.

From 2010 to 2012, Temata was country director for HOPEworldwidePNG, a non-governmental organization focused on community healthcare, as well as agriculture and education in Papua New Guinea. She then became the founding director and chief executive for Esselars, a security company.

Before becoming High Commissioner, Temata served concurrently as the New Zealand's lead negotiator for the PACER Plus free trade agreement, which would include Australia, New Zealand and other members of the Pacific Islands Forum, as well as the unit manager of the Pacific Regional Division, headquartered in Wellington.

In September 2018, New Zealand's Foreign Minister Winston Peters appointed Tessa Temata as the High Commissioner to the Cook Islands. Temata officially became New Zealand's High Commissioner to the Cook Islands in February 2019, becoming the first person of Cook Islander descent to hold the position, as well as the second woman to serve as High Commissioner. (Linda Te Puni, the High Commissioner from 2010 to 2011, was the first woman to serve as High Commissioner). Temata was also the first woman of Pacific Island descent to head a New Zealand diplomatic mission anywhere in the Pacific Islands region.

Tessa Temata died in Palmerston North, New Zealand, where she had been receiving medical treatment, on 8 December 2019, at the age of 52. A memorial service was held on 19 December 2019 at Ngatipa, the official residence of the New Zealand High Commission in Rarotonga, Cook Islands. Attendees included Prime Minister of the Cook Islands Henry Puna and Makea George Karika Ariki of the House of Ariki.
