= Colin James Pennycuick =

British scientist (1933–2019)

Colin James Pennycuick FRS
- Born: 11 June 1933; Windsor, England
- Died: 9 December 2019 (aged 86)
- Education: Merton College, Oxford, Peterhouse, Cambridge (BSc, PhD)
- Scientific career
- Fields: Zoology
- Workplaces: University of Bristol

Colin James Pennycuick FRS (11 June 1933—9 December 2019) was a British Scientist who studied flight in birds, encompassing theoretical and practical research.

== Life ==
He read biology at Merton College, Oxford from 1951 to 1955. During this time he enlisted in the RAF, graduating to Flying Officer in 1956. He would later exploit his pilot skills to follow and study migrating birds. He earned his PhD in the Zoology Department at Cambridge University in 1962, studying the electromechanics of frog muscles, before moving to the animal behaviour laboratory for a postdoctoral position where he studied the homing of pigeons.

In 1964 he joined the University of Bristol for the first of three periods in his research career, ending in 2015. During his career he was also associated with the University of Miami and Lund University.

He was elected Fellow of the Royal Society in 1990.
