= Gordon Daniel Morgan =

American sociologist (1931–2019)

Gordon Daniel Morgan (October 31, 1931 – December 17, 2019) was an American sociologist who became the first Black professor at the University of Arkansas in 1969.

== Life ==
Gordon Morgan was born in 1931 in Mayflower, Arkansas to Roosevelt Morgan and Georgia Madlock Morgan. He went to college at the Arkansas Agricultural, Mechanical & Normal College (the largest and oldest historically black college in the state, which later (re)joined the University of Arkansas system as University of Arkansas at Pine Bluff), where he graduated in sociology in 1953. Morgan served in the US Army from 1953 in the Korean War, and became first lieutenant in the artillery.

He continued graduate studies as one of the first Black students at the University of Arkansas (MA in sociology, 1956), and then continued at the University of Minnesota and Washington State University (PhD, 1961).

He married in 1957 with Izola Preston, and they had 4 children.

== Academic ==
After working as researcher in Kampala, Uganda and teaching at his alma mater Arkansas AM&N and Lincoln University (Missouri), Morgan was hired as the first Black assistant professor at the University of Arkansas in 1969. He did research on a range of topics, including the intersection between race and education, the Caribbean, the use of the dollar standard in African countries and sociology in general.

Morgan co-founded the university's Black Student Association in the wake of Martin Luther King Jr. in 1969 and mentored thousands of students.

Morgan published multiple books, including America without Ethnicity (1981) and more for public consumption The Edge of Campus: A Journal of the Black Experience at the University of Arkansas (1990, together with his wife).

Morgan retired in 2012.

== Recognition ==
Morgan was appointed as 'University Professor', a distinguished status reserved for professors with national or international recognition that have extensive tenure. The university named one of the student residence halls after him: Gordon Morgan Hall.
