= Takeo Daigo =

Japanese baseball player (1938–2019)

- Catcher
- Born: 15 November 1938; Kita, Tokyo, Japan
- Died: 11 December 2019 (aged 81); Tokyo, Japan
- Batted: Right Threw: Right

NPB debut
- 31 March, 1957, for the Mainichi Orions

Last appearance
- 16 October, 1974, for the Lotte Orions

NPB statistics
- Batting average: .234
- Home runs: 81
- Runs batted in: 472
- Stats at Baseball Reference

Teams
- Mainichi/Daimai/Tokyo/Lotte Orions (1957–1974)

Takeo Daigo (醍醐 猛夫, Daigo Takeo; 15 November 1938 – 11 December 2019) was a Japanese professional baseball catcher. He played in Nippon Professional Baseball for the Orions franchise.

Daigo was born in Kita, Tokyo, on 15 November 1938. As a high school baseball player, he participated in the Kōshien tournaments alongside batterymate Sadaharu Oh in 1956. When Daigo made his Nippon Professional Baseball debut in 1957, his team was called the Mainichi Orions. Upon his retirement as a player in 1975, the team had become known as the Lotte Orions. Daigo was a career .234/.275/.324 hitter, and not known for power. After he retired as a player, Daigo became a coach for the Orions/Marines. He died in Tokyo of acute myeloid leukemia on 11 December 2019, aged 81.
