= Hilary B. Doran Jr. =

American politician (1936–2019)

Member of the Texas House of Representatives from the 65th district
- In office January 10, 1967 – January 9, 1973

Member of the Texas House of Representatives from the 70th district
- In office January 9, 1973 – January 14, 1975

Personal details
- Born: August 16, 1936 Del Rio, Texas, U.S.
- Died: December 21, 2019 (aged 83)
- Party: Democratic
- Education: Southwest Texas State College

Hilary B. Doran Jr. (August 16, 1936 – December 21, 2019) was an American politician. He served as a Democratic member for the 65th and 70th district of the Texas House of Representatives.

== Life and career ==
Doran was born in Del Rio, Texas. He attended Del Rio High School, Texas A&M University and Southwest Texas State College.

Doran served in the Texas House of Representatives from 1967 to 1975.

Doran died on December 21, 2019, at the age of 83.
