= Muriel Seltman =

British left-wing activist, mathematics educator, historian of mathematics, and author

Muriel Seltman (née Barnett; 27 March 1927 – 2 December 2019) was a British left-wing activist, mathematics educator, historian of mathematics, and author of books on mathematics, religion, politics, and philosophy.

== Life ==
Seltman was born in Stamford Hill, a Jewish neighborhood of London, on 27 March 1927. She studied mathematics and mathematics education at Trinity College Dublin, and met her husband there. They joined the Communist Party of Great Britain in 1952, but by the early 1960s had been expelled from the party for their anti-revisionism (sympathy for Maoism and opposition to the Khrushchev Thaw). They traveled with their son to North Korea, where Seltman worked as a teacher, but, bored with the North Korean cult of personality and their life there, left for China in 1965, just in time for the Cultural Revolution. Disillusioned, they returned to England in 1966, and Seltman later wrote a book What's Left? What's Right? describing her experiences.

She taught mathematics at Avery Hill College beginning in 1968, retiring in 1981 but continuing on a part-time basis for another 20 years, through the college's 1985 incorporation into the University of Greenwich. Her works in mathematics and the history of mathematics include a translation of a book on algebra by Thomas Harriot, originally published in 1631, a few years after Harriot's death. Co-editor Robert Goulding provided the translation, while Seltman was responsible for the book's detailed commentary on Harriot's work, with both translation and commentary based on a master's thesis she wrote at University College London, A Commentary on the Artis Analyticae Praxis of Thomas Harriot (1972). She also completed a PhD at University College London, with the dissertation Descartes's "Regulae ad directionem ingenii": a case-study in the emergence of early modern algebra (1987).

Although of Jewish descent, she became a nontheist Quaker, and despite her early experiences continued to describe herself as a Marxist. She died on 2 December 2019.

== Books ==
Seltman's books include:

- Piaget's Logic: A Critique of Genetic Epistemology (with Peter Seltman, George Allen & Unwin, 1985)
- Thomas Harriot's Artis Analyticae Praxis: An English Translation with Commentary (edited with Robert Goulding, Springer, 2007)
- What's Left? What's Right?: A Political Journey via North Korea and the Chinese Cultural Revolution (Dorrance Publishing, 2010)
- Bread and Roses: Nontheism and the Human Spirit (Matador, 2013)
- The Changing Faces of Antisemitism (Matador, 2015)
- Rescuing God From Religion (Matador, 2016)
- Rescuing Jesus from Christianity (Matador, 2018)
- Marx the Humanist (Troubador, 2019)
