= Georget Bertoncello =

Belgian footballer (1943–2019)

Personal information
- Date of birth: 3 September 1943
- Place of birth: Charleroi, Belgium
- Date of death: 22 December 2019 (aged 76)
- Height: 1.68 m (5 ft 6 in)
- Position: Striker

Senior career*
Years	Team	Apps	(Gls)
1959–1964	Sporting Charleroi		
1964–1967	RFC Liège		
1967–1975	Sporting Charleroi		
1975–1976	UR Namur		
1976–1977	Olympic Charleroi		
1977–1978	UR Namur		
- * Club domestic league appearances and goals

Georget Bertoncello (3 September 1943 – 22 December 2019) was a Belgian footballer who played as a striker.
