= Deaths in November 2019 =

The following is a list of notable deaths in November 2019.

Entries for each day are listed alphabetically by surname. A typical entry lists information in the following sequence:

- Name, age, country of citizenship at birth, subsequent country of citizenship (if applicable), reason for notability, cause of death (if known), and reference.

== November 2019 ==
=== 1 ===
- Rudy Boesch, 91, American Navy SEAL, reality show contestant (Survivor: Borneo, Survivor: All-Stars) and host (Combat Missions), Alzheimer's disease.
- Roger Cardinal, 79, British art historian.
- Peter Collier, 80, American writer.
- Romuald D'Souza, 93, Indian Jesuit priest, founder of the Xavier Centre of Historical Research.
- Thomas V. Falkie, 85, American mining engineer.
- Gilles Fontaine, 71, Canadian astrophysicist.
- Pierre Gabaye, 89, French composer.
- Diana González, 26, Mexican footballer (América), hypoglycemia.
- Chandra Kaluarachchi, 76, Sri Lankan actress (Seilama).
- Ary Kara, 77, Brazilian politician, Deputy (1983–2007), cancer.
- Bill Koman, 85, American football player (St. Louis Cardinals).
- Rina Lazo, 96, Guatemalan-born Mexican painter, cardiac arrest.
- Mark LeBlanc, 69, American sailor.
- Daniel Mullins, 90, Irish-born Welsh Roman Catholic prelate, Bishop of Menevia (1987–2001).
- Thuliswa Nkabinde-Khawe, 46, South African politician, member of the Gauteng Provincial Legislature (since 2009).
- Miguel Olaortúa Laspra, 56, Spanish Roman Catholic prelate, Apostolic Vicar of Iquitos (since 2011).
- Frank R. Palmer, 97, British linguist.
- Tsvyatko Pashkulev, 74, Bulgarian Olympic wrestler (1964).
- Renford Pinnock, 82, Jamaican cricketer.
- Dave Quirke, 72, Irish footballer (Gillingham).
- Johannes Schaaf, 86, German film and stage director (Momo).
- Archie Scott, 101, Scottish cricketer (national team).
- Wilbur Summers, 65, American football player (Detroit Lions).
- Paul Turner, 73, Welsh film director (Hedd Wyn).
- Hugh Waddell, 60, Scottish rugby league player.
- Jerome L. Wilson, 88, American politician, member of the New York State Senate (1963–1966), pneumonia.
- Vytautas Zabiela, 88, Lithuanian lawyer and politician, member of the Seimas (2003–2004).

=== 2 ===
- Gene G. Abdallah, 83, American politician, member of the South Dakota Legislature (2001–2012).
- Ian Cross, 93, New Zealand author (The God Boy) and journalist.
- Dick Dearden, 81, American politician, member of the Iowa Senate (1995–2017).
- Gustav Deutsch, 67, Austrian artist and filmmaker.
- Norbert Eder, 63, German footballer (Bayern Munich, Zürich, national team).
- Atilla Engin, 73, Turkish jazz drummer, stroke.
- Sigvard Ericsson, 89, Swedish speed skater, Olympic champion (1956).
- James Kerr Findlay, 83, Scottish magistrate.
- Irwin Fridovich, 90, American biochemist.
- Susana Herrera, 56, Spanish alpine skier, Paralympic champion (1988), lung cancer.
- Tom Hughes, 85, American baseball player (St. Louis Cardinals).
- Abdillahi Fadal Iman, 59, Somaliland military official.
- Leo Iorga, 54, Romanian rock singer and guitarist, lung cancer.
- Phillip E. Johnson, 79, American lawyer, co-founder of Intelligent design movement.
- Marie Laforêt, 80, French-Swiss singer ("Mon amour, mon ami") and actress (Male Hunt, Who Wants to Kill Sara?).
- Krishan Kumar Modi, 79, Indian business executive (Modi Enterprises).
- Walter Mercado, 87, Puerto Rican astrologer, kidney failure.
- Vaijnath Patil, 81, Indian politician, MLA (1994–1999, 2004–2008).
- Dean Prentice, 87, Canadian ice hockey player (New York Rangers, Boston Bruins, Pittsburgh Penguins).
- P. Purushothaman, 71, Indian politician, MLA (1985–1990, 2011–2016), cardiac arrest.
- James I. Robertson Jr., 89, American historian.
- Indrajit Tangi, 75, Indian politician, MLA (2006–2011).
- Brian Tarantina, 60, American actor (The Marvelous Mrs. Maisel, City by the Sea, Gilmore Girls), accidental drug overdose.
- Bramwell Tillsley, 88, Canadian Salvationist, General of The Salvation Army (1993–1994).
- Bohumil Tomášek, 83, Czech Olympic basketball player (1960).

=== 3 ===
- Wendell Bell, 95, American futurist.
- Gert Boyle, 95, German-born American business executive (Columbia Sportswear) and philanthropist.
- William B. Branch, 92, American playwright, cancer.
- Gerry Carr, 83, British Olympic athlete (1956).
- Ion Dediu, 85, Moldovan biologist.
- Michel Eddé, 91, Lebanese politician and businessman.
- Louis Eppolito, 71, American police officer, mobster and author.
- Sorin Frunzăverde, 59, Romanian politician, MP (2007–2009) and Minister of National Defence (2000, 2006–2007), kidney disease.
- G. Simon Harak, 71, American theologian and peace activist.
- Hu Zhaoxi, 86, Chinese historian.
- Gabriel Jackson, 98, American Hispanist.
- Louis Lareng, 96, French physician and politician.
- Friedemann Layer, 78, Austrian conductor.
- Marista Leishman, 87, English author and educator.
- Yvette Lundy, 103, French Resistance member and Legion of Honour recipient.
- Harish Mahapatra, Indian politician, MLA (1971–1977).
- Taku Mayumura, 85, Japanese science fiction novelist (Psychic School Wars), aspiration pneumonia.
- Declan Meagher, 98, Irish obstetrician.
- Robert Ponsonby, 92, English arts administrator.
- Alberto Rivolta, 51, Italian footballer (Inter Milan, Livorno, Seregno), ependymoma.
- Shoji Sadao, 92, Japanese-American architect.
- Tollyn Twitchell, 91, American architect.
- Girônimo Zanandréa, 83, Brazilian Roman Catholic prelate, Coadjutor Bishop (1987–1994) and Bishop of Erexim (1994–2012).

=== 4 ===
- Adam Babah-Alargi, 91, Ghanaian engineer.
- Gay Byrne, 85, Irish broadcaster (The Late Late Show, The Gay Byrne Show, The Meaning of Life).
- Jacques Dupont, 91, French racing cyclist, Olympic champion (1948).
- Yılmaz Gökdel, 79, Turkish football player and manager.
- Timi Hansen, 61, Danish bassist (Mercyful Fate, King Diamond), cancer.
- Sadeque Hossain Khoka, 67, Bangladeshi politician, mayor of Dhaka City Corporation (2002–2011), cancer.
- Jim LeClair, 69, American football player (Cincinnati Bengals, New Jersey Generals).
- Virginia Leith, 94, American actress (Fear and Desire, The Brain That Wouldn't Die).
- David Levinson, 80, American television producer and writer.
- David M. Madden, 64, American politician, mayor of Weymouth, Massachusetts (2000–2008).
- Johannes Michalski, 83, Belgian-born American painter.
- Pedro Murúa, 88, Spanish Olympic field hockey player.
- Richard Nelson, 77, American anthropologist.
- Eli Pasquale, 59, Canadian Olympic basketball player (1984, 1988), cancer.
- Chris Ransick, 57, American author and poet, pancreatic cancer.
- Tun Lwin, 71, Burmese meteorologist.
- Dmitri Vasilenko, 43, Russian gymnast, Olympic champion (1996), amyotrophic lateral sclerosis.

=== 5 ===
- Omero Antonutti, 84, Italian actor (Pleasant Nights, Padre Padrone, El Dorado), cancer.
- Sally Dixon, 87, American film curator, cancer.
- Ed Dolejs, 90, American-born New Zealand Hall of Fame softball coach (national women's team).
- Dominique Farran, 72, French radio presenter (RTL).
- Ernest J. Gaines, 86, American author (A Lesson Before Dying, The Autobiography of Miss Jane Pittman, A Gathering of Old Men).
- Laurel Griggs, 13, American actress (Once, Café Society), asthma attack.
- Georges Gutelman, 80, Belgian airline executive (Trans European Airways) and evacuator (Operation Moses).
- Kevin Hogan, 85, Australian footballer (South Melbourne) and radio broadcaster (ABC Local Radio).
- Tom Keele, 86, American football coach.
- Jan Erik Kongshaug, 75, Norwegian recording engineer and jazz guitarist.
- Anatoliy Nogovitsyn, 67, Russian military officer, Deputy Chief of the General Staff of Armed Forces (2008–2012).
- Larion Serghei, 67, Romanian sprint canoer, Olympic bronze medalist (1976).
- Michael Sherwood, 60, American musician.
- Rhea G. Sikes, 97, American television producer.
- Ulf-Erik Slotte, 87, Finnish diplomat, Ambassador to Turkey (1973–1977), Australia (1988–1991) and Ireland (1991–1996).
- Robert Smithies, 71, English-born Australian rugby league player (Hull Kingston Rovers, Balmain).
- William Wintersole, 88, American actor (The Young and the Restless, General Hospital, Leadbelly), complications from cancer.
- André Zimmermann, 80, French racing cyclist, Tour de l'Avenir winner (1963).

=== 6 ===
- Tazeen Ahmad, 48, British journalist and broadcaster (NBC, BBC, Channel 4), cancer.
- Kurt Amplatz, 95, Austrian-born American radiologist and inventor.
- Lev Anninsky, 85, Russian literary critic, historian and screenwriter.
- Lorene Byron Brown, 85, American librarian.
- Cheng Sihan, 58, Chinese actor (Journey to the West: Conquering the Demons, The Taking of Tiger Mountain), heart attack.
- Dave Crossan, 79, American football player (Washington Redskins).
- John Curro, 86, Australian violinist and conductor.
- Stephen Dixon, 83, American author, complications from pneumonia and Parkinson's disease.
- Michael Fray, 72, Jamaican Olympic sprinter (1968).
- Bogaletch Gebre, 59, Ethiopian women's rights activist (KMG Ethiopia).
- Michael Hanack, 88, German chemist.
- Juliaan Lampens, 93, Belgian architect.
- Richard Lindley, 83, British television journalist.
- Daniel Lobb, 80, British optical instrument designer.
- Nikki Araguz Loyd, 44, American LGBT rights activist, author and public speaker, accidental drug overdose.
- Clive Minton, 85, Australian ornithologist.
- Surjeet Singh Panesar, 81, Kenyan Olympic field hockey player.
- Jan Stráský, 78, Czech politician, Prime Minister of Czechoslovakia (1992).
- Mike Streicher, 62, American Hall of Fame racing driver.
- Albert Tévoédjrè, 89, Beninese writer and politician.
- Fred Wain, 91, Australian rules footballer (Hawthorn).

=== 7 ===
- Mayeen Uddin Khan Badal, 67, Bangladeshi politician, MP (since 2008).
- Gilles Bertin, 58, French singer (Camera Silens) and criminal, AIDS.
- Remo Bodei, 81, Italian philosopher.
- Luis Carmona, 96, Chilean Olympic pentathlete.
- Ted Davis, 77, American football player (Baltimore Colts, New Orleans Saints, Miami Dolphins).
- Robert Freeman, 82, English photographer (With the Beatles, A Hard Day's Night, Rubber Soul) and graphic designer.
- Heinz Höher, 81, German football player (Bayer Leverkusen, Bochum) and manager (PAOK).
- Stanley Hughes, 101, Canadian mycologist.
- Betty Jones, 89, American operatic spinto soprano.
- Leo Klejn, 92, Russian archaeologist and philologist.
- Robert J. LaFlam, 88, American politician.
- Ivan Maksimović, 57, Serbian rock guitarist (Metro, The No Smoking Orchestra).
- Dan McGrew, 82, American football player (Buffalo Bills).
- Fiorella Negro, 81, Italian Olympic figure skater (1956).
- Maria Perego, 95, Italian animator, creator of Topo Gigio.
- Jean Piqué, 84, French rugby union player.
- Roslyn Poignant, 92, Australian photographic anthropologist.
- Nik Powell, 69, British film producer and record executive, co-founder of Virgin Records, Director of the National Film and Television School (2003–2017).
- Margarita Salas, 80, Spanish biochemist and academic.
- Frank Saul, 95, American basketball player (Minneapolis Lakers, Baltimore Bullets, Rochester Royals).
- Nabaneeta Dev Sen, 81, Indian novelist, cancer.
- Janette Sherman, 89, American physician and toxicology researcher.
- Haitham Ahmed Zaki, 35, Egyptian actor (Halim), circulatory collapse.

=== 8 ===
- W. George Allen, 83, American civil rights activist and lawyer.
- Fred Bongusto, 84, Italian singer, songwriter and film composer (Day After Tomorrow, The Divorce, Come Have Coffee with Us).
- Amor Chadli, 94, Tunisian physician and politician, Minister of Education (1986–1987).
- Lucette Destouches, 107, French ballet dancer and instructor.
- Werner Doehner, 90, German-born American electrical engineer, last living survivor of the Hindenburg disaster.
- Jeanette Gundel, 77, Polish-born American linguist.
- Ramakant Gundecha, 57, Indian classical singer, heart attack.
- Annie Hall, 69, British businesswoman, High Sheriff of Derbyshire (2017–2018), drowned.
- Terry Katzman, 64, American record producer, sound engineer, and archivist.
- Anatoly Krutikov, 86, Russian football player (CSKA Moscow, Spartak Moscow) and manager (Spartak Nalchik).
- Billy Ray Locklin, 83, American football player (Hamilton Tiger-Cats, Montreal Alouettes, Oakland Raiders).
- Cyril McGuinness, 54, Irish criminal and smuggler, heart attack.
- Jackie Moore, 73, American singer.
- Felipe Reynoso Jiménez, 100, Mexican politician, Municipal President of Aguascalientes (1975–1977).
- Fróso Spentzári, 77, Greek pharmacist and politician, MP (1981–1985).
- Thích Trí Quang, 95, Vietnamese Mahayana Buddhist monk and political activist.

=== 9 ===
- Ross Bell, 90, American entomologist.
- Anne Bredon, 89, American folk singer and songwriter ("Babe I'm Gonna Leave You").
- George Breen, 84, American Hall of Fame swimmer, Olympic silver (1956) and bronze medalist (1956, 1960), pancreatic cancer.
- Sandile Dikeni, 53, South African poet, tuberculosis.
- Les Downes, 74, New Zealand cricketer (Central Districts).
- Ore Falomo, 77, Nigerian physician.
- John Gokongwei, 93, Filipino businessman and philanthropist, founder of JG Summit Holdings.
- Noel Ignatiev, 78, American author and historian, intestinal infarction.
- Zaid Kilani, 81, Jordanian gynecologist.
- Kehinde Lijadu, 71, Nigerian singer (Lijadu Sisters), stroke.
- Carlyle A. Luer, 97, American botanist.
- Harold C. Lyon Jr., 84, American psychologist and educator.
- Rebecca Matlock, 91, American photographer.
- Brian Mawhinney, Baron Mawhinney, 79, British politician, MP (1979–2005), Minister for Health (1992–1994).
- Andrea Newman, 81, English author.
- Cecil Pedlow, 85, Irish rugby union player (Lions, national team).
- Dwight Ritchie, 27, Australian boxer.
- Cyril Robinson, 90, English footballer (Blackpool, Bradford (Park Avenue), Southport).
- Yusuf Scott, 42, American football player (Arizona Cardinals, Berlin Thunder).
- Džemma Skulme, 94, Latvian artist and painter.
- Bob Szajner, 81, American jazz pianist.
- Mehmet Tillem, 45, Turkish-born Australian politician, senator (2013–2014), cardiac arrest.
- Douglas Vaz, 83, Jamaican politician, MP (1976–1993).
- Hans Verèl, 66, Dutch football player (Sparta Rotterdam) and manager (FC Den Bosch, NAC).

=== 10 ===
- Jim Adams, 91, American lacrosse coach (Army Black Knights, Penn Quakers, Virginia Cavaliers).
- Werner Andreas Albert, 84, German composer and conductor.
- Annie Anzieu, 95, French psychoanalyst.
- Jan Byrczek, 83, Polish-American jazz bassist, founder of Jazz Forum.
- Les Campbell, 84, English footballer (Wigan Athletic, Preston North End, Blackpool).
- Russell Chatham, 80, American painter.
- Bob Fry, 88, American football player (Los Angeles Rams, Dallas Cowboys).
- Luciano De Genova, 88, Italian Olympic weightlifter (1956, 1960).
- Allan Gray, 81, South African investor and philanthropist, founder of Allan Gray Investment Management.
- Jerry Hirshberg, 79, American automotive and industrial designer, musician and painter.
- Paul W. Hodge, 85, American astronomer.
- Erik Køppen, 96, Danish footballer (KB, national team).
- Li Lianxiu, 95, Chinese military and police officer, Commander of the People's Armed Police (1984–1990).
- Rick Ludwin, 71, American television executive (NBC).
- Oliver Miles, 83, British diplomat, ambassador to Luxembourg (1985–1988) and Greece (1993–1996).
- Lawrence G. Paull, 81, American film production designer (Blade Runner, Back to the Future, City Slickers).
- T. N. Seshan, 86, Indian civil servant, Chief Election Commissioner (1990–1996) and Cabinet Secretary (1989), cardiac arrest.
- Dennis Sorrell, 79, English footballer (Leyton Orient).
- István Szívós, 71, Hungarian Hall of Fame water polo player, Olympic champion (1976).
- Vanni Treves, 79, Italian-born British lawyer and business executive.
- Bernard Tyson, 60, American executive, CEO (since 2013) and chairman (since 2014) of Kaiser Permanente.

=== 11 ===
- Alaa Ali, 31, Egyptian footballer (Smouha, Zamalek), cancer.
- Bad Azz, 43, American rapper.
- Jacques Barreau, 96, French Olympic footballer.
- Tauba Biterman, 102, Polish-born American Holocaust survivor.
- Zeke Bratkowski, 88, American football player (Chicago Bears, Los Angeles Rams, Green Bay Packers).
- Carol Brightman, 80, American author.
- Mary Christian, 95, American politician, member of the Virginia House of Delegates (1986–2003).
- Ted Cullinan, 88, English architect (Charles Cryer Theatre, Fountains Abbey, Weald and Downland Gridshell).
- Tam David-West, 83, Nigerian virologist, federal minister and academic.
- Frank Dobson, 79, British politician, MP (1979–2015), Secretary of State for Health (1997–1999).
- Stuart Fitzsimmons, 62, British Olympic alpine skier (1976), pneumonia.
- Alan Hagman, 55, American photojournalist and editor (Los Angeles Times).
- Jacky Imbert, 89, French criminal.
- Richard Victor Jones, 90, American physicist.
- Lisa Kindred, 79, American folk musician, POEMS syndrome.
- Winston Lackin, 64, Surinamese politician, Minister of Foreign Affairs (2010–2015).
- Priscilla Lockwood, 82, American politician, member of the New Hampshire House of Representatives (1998–2014), pancreatic cancer.
- James Le Mesurier, 48, British army officer and aid worker (White Helmets).
- John Murrell, 74, American-born Canadian playwright.
- Tadashi Nakamura, 89, Japanese voice actor (Star of the Giants, Ironfist Chinmi, Like the Clouds, Like the Wind), complications from gallbladder inflammation.
- Ben Olan, 96, American sportswriter.
- Ralph T. O'Neal, 85, British Virgin Islands politician, Premier (1995–2003, 2007–2011).
- Charles Rogers, 38, American football player (Detroit Lions), liver failure.
- J. Blair Seaborn, 95, Canadian diplomat and civil servant.
- Mümtaz Soysal, 90, Turkish politician and lawyer, Minister of Foreign Affairs (1994) and vice-chairman of Amnesty International (1976–1978).
- Helen Stern, 89, American sculptor, art collector and philanthropist, pneumonia.
- Robin Lee Wilson, 86, British civil engineer, President of the Institution of Civil Engineers (1991–1992).
- Minoru Yoneyama, 95, Japanese businessman, founder of Yonex.
- Sir Edward Zacca, 88, Jamaican judge, Chief Justice (1985–1996) and acting Governor-General (1991).

=== 12 ===
- Baha Abu al-Ata, 41, Palestinian Islamic militant, air strike.
- Edwin Bramall, Baron Bramall, 95, British field marshal, Chief of the General Staff (1979–1982) and the Defence Staff (1982–1985).
- Mel Brown, 84, Canadian Olympic basketball player (1956).
- Ian Cullen, 80, British actor (Z-Cars, Family Affairs).
- Benedict de Tscharner, 82, Swiss writer and diplomat, Ambassador to France (1997–2002).
- Herb Dickenson, 88, Canadian ice hockey player (New York Rangers).
- George Feifer, 85, American journalist, author and historian.
- Dennis Hartley, 83, English rugby league footballer (Hunslet, Castleford Tigers).
- Zoran Hristić, 81, Serbian composer.
- Bob Johnson, 83, American baseball player (Washington Senators, Baltimore Orioles, Oakland Athletics).
- Vasiliy Kurilov, 71, Belarusian football player (Dinamo Minsk, Kolos Poltava, Dynamo Brest) and manager.
- Harry Lamme, 84, Dutch Olympic water polo player.
- Lu Youquan, 76, Chinese education scholar.
- Luciano Marin, 87, Italian actor (A Man of Straw, Goliath and the Barbarians, The Commandant).
- Raju Mathew, 82, Indian film producer (Kelkkaatha Sabdham, Anubandham, Thanmathra).
- Jim McBurney, 86, Canadian ice hockey player (Chicago Blackhawks).
- William J. McCoy, 77, American politician, member (1980–2012) and speaker (2004–2012) of the Mississippi House of Representatives.
- Basile Adjou Moumouni, 97, Beninese physician.
- Meg Myles, 84, American actress (Satan in High Heels).
- Ann Peoples, 72, American politician, member of the Maine House of Representatives (2006–2014, since 2018).
- Charles Perrow, 94, American sociologist.
- Víctor Manuel Pérez Rojas, 79, Venezuelan Roman Catholic prelate, Bishop of San Fernando de Apure (2001–2016).
- Ram Ray, 77, Indian advertising professional.
- Rosemary Rogers, 86, British-American novelist.
- Dois I. Rosser Jr., 98, American businessman and missionary.
- Martin Sagner, 77, Croatian actor and politician, MP (1990–1995).
- Mitsuhisa Taguchi, 64, Japanese footballer (Mitsubishi Motors, national team), respiratory failure.
- Vincenzo Zazzaro, 68, Italian footballer (Milan, Arezzo, Salernitana).

=== 13 ===
- Stephen Albert, 69, Australian indigenous actor and singer (Bran Nue Dae, Corrugation Road).
- Sean Bonney, 50, English poet.
- Guillermo Cosío Vidaurri, 90, Mexican diplomat and politician, Governor of Jalisco (1989–1992), Deputy (1976–1979, 1985–1988) and Secretary General of PRI (1981), dengue.
- Giorgio Corbellini, 72, Italian Roman Catholic prelate, President of the Disciplinary Commission of the Roman Curia (since 2010).
- Zulkarnain Karim, 69, Indonesian politician, member of the Regional Representative Council (2014–2019), and mayor of Pangkal Pinang (2003–2013).
- Robert Lyon, 96, British army major general.
- Arthur Marks, 92, American film and television director (Detroit 9000, Friday Foster, Perry Mason).
- Kieran Modra, 47, Australian swimmer and cyclist, Paralympic champion (1996, 2004, 2008, 2012), traffic collision.
- André Moes, Luxembourgish Olympic road cyclist (1952).
- Andrew Palmer, 82, British diplomat, Ambassador to the Holy See (1991–1995).
- Andy Pollitt, 56, British rock climber, cerebral aneurysm.
- Raymond Poulidor, 83, French racing cyclist, Vuelta a España winner (1964).
- Tom Spurgeon, 50, American journalist, comics critic and editor (The Comics Journal), Eisner Award winner (2010, 2012, 2013).
- M. Wesley Swearingen, 92, American FBI agent.
- Yukihiro Takiguchi, 34, Japanese actor (Musical: The Prince of Tennis, Kamen Rider Drive), heart failure.
- Josephus Thimister, 57, Dutch fashion designer, suicide.
- Niall Tóibín, 89, Irish comedian and actor (Ryan's Daughter, Far and Away, Veronica Guerin).
- Fernando Torres Durán, 82, Colombian-born Panamanian Roman Catholic prelate, Bishop of Chitré (1999–2013).
- Bill Trowbridge, 89, British physicist and engineer.
- José Luis Veloso, 82, Spanish footballer (Deportivo de La Coruña, Real Madrid).
- Volney F. Warner, 93, American general.
- Zhang Qi, 96, Chinese physician and professor.

=== 14 ===
- Robert Agranoff, 83, American political scientist and public administration scholar.
- María Baxa, 73, Italian-Serbian actress (Black Turin, Deadly Chase, Candido Erotico).
- Caroline Doig, 81, Scottish pediatric surgeon.
- Tim Fasano, 64, American Bigfoot hunter and blogger.
- Jean Fergusson, 74, English actress (Last of the Summer Wine, Coronation Street).
- Gordie Gosse, 64, Canadian politician, member (2003–2015) and speaker (2011–2013) of the Nova Scotia House of Assembly, cancer.
- Anthony Grundy, 40, American basketball player (Atlanta Hawks, Panellinios, AEK), stabbed.
- Branko Lustig, 87, Croatian film producer (Schindler's List, Gladiator, The Peacemaker) and Holocaust survivor, Oscar winner (1994, 2001).
- Charles Moir, 88, American college basketball coach (Roanoke, Tulane, Virginia Tech), heart failure.
- Uwe Rathjen, 76, German Olympic handball player (1972).
- Judith Roche, 88, American writer.
- Orville Rogers, 101, American pilot and marathon runner.
- Zwelonke Sigcawu, 51, South African royal, King of the Xhosa people (since 2006).
- Vashishtha Narayan Singh, 77, Indian mathematician.
- Raymond Smee, 89, Australian Olympic water polo player.
- Alex Winitsky, 94, American film producer (The Seven-Per-Cent Solution, Cuba, Irreconcilable Differences).

=== 15 ===
- Alex Akinyele, 81, Nigerian politician and sports administrator.
- Olav Bjørgaas, 93, Norwegian physician (Norwegian Mission Alliance).
- Mark Cady, 66, American judge, Chief Justice of the Iowa Supreme Court (since 2011), heart attack.
- Jim Coates, 87, American baseball player (New York Yankees, California Angels).
- Harrison Dillard, 96, American sprinter and hurdler, Olympic champion (1948, 1952), stomach cancer.
- John Exelby, 78, British television executive.
- Susan Fargo, 77, American politician, member of the Massachusetts Senate (1997–2012).
- Fu Zhengyi, 93–94, Chinese film editor, winner of the Golden Rooster Award for Lifetime Achievement (2011).
- Jeanne Guillemin, 76, American medical anthropologist.
- John S. Hilliard, 72, American composer.
- Vladimir Hotineanu, 69, Moldovan surgeon and politician, Minister of Health, Labour and Social Protection (2009–2010), MP (2010–2019).
- Vojtěch Jasný, 93, Czech film director (September Nights, All My Compatriots, The Great Land of Small).
- Tony Mann, 74, Australian cricketer (national team), pancreatic cancer.
- Marcel Mart, 92, Luxembourgish politician, Minister for the Economy, Energy and Transport (1969–1977) and president of European Court of Auditors (1984–1989).
- Sallie McFague, 86, American Christian feminist theologian.
- Joanna McKittrick, 65, American engineer.
- Nini Mutch, 89, Canadian curler.
- Irv Noren, 94, American baseball player (Washington Senators, New York Yankees) and coach (Oakland Athletics).
- Krystyna Nowakowska, 83, Polish Olympic athlete (1960).
- Kalman Packouz, 69, American Orthodox rabbi.
- Juliusz Paetz, 84, Polish Roman Catholic prelate, Bishop of Łomża (1982–1996) and Archbishop of Poznań (1996–2002).
- Mincho Pashov, 58, Bulgarian Olympic weightlifter.
- Ray Preston, 90, Australian rugby league player (Newtown Jets).
- Gary Regan, 68, British-born American bartender and writer, pneumonia.
- Papa Don Schroeder, 78, American radio station owner (WPNN) and record producer, throat cancer.
- Jorge Vergara, 64, Mexican businessman and film producer (The Assassination of Richard Nixon), owner of Chivas Guadalajara (since 2002) and founder of Grupo Omnilife, heart attack.
- Johan Wahjudi, 66, Indonesian badminton player, world champion (1977).

=== 16 ===
- Wayne Alstat, 85, American politician.
- John Campbell Brown, 72, Scottish astronomer, Astronomer Royal for Scotland (since 1995).
- Gilbert Brunat, 61, French rugby union player (Lourdes, Grenoble, national team).
- Nancy Brunning, 48, New Zealand actress (What Becomes of the Broken Hearted?), cancer.
- Browning Bryant, 62, American singer-songwriter.
- Fernand Carton, 98, French linguist.
- Mireille Cayre, 72, French Olympic gymnast (1968, 1972).
- Irma Cordero, 77, Peruvian Olympic volleyball player (1968, 1976).
- Bronisław Dembowski, 92, Polish Roman Catholic prelate, Bishop of Włocławek (1992–2003).
- Diane Loeffler, 66, American politician, member of the Minnesota House of Representatives (since 2005), cancer.
- Peter Loftin, 62, American entrepreneur.
- Satnarayan Maharaj, 88, Trinidadian Hindu religious leader, assistant secretary (1972–1977) and secretary general (since 1977) of the Sanatan Dharma Maha Sabha, stroke.
- Robert Malouf, 88, Canadian Olympic boxer (1952).
- Éric Morena, 68, French singer.
- Fabrizio Nassi, 68, Italian Olympic volleyball player (1976, 1980).
- Bogdan Niculescu-Duvăz, 69, Romanian politician, MP (1990–2016).
- Terry O'Neill, 81, British photographer, prostate cancer.
- Mary Previte, 87, American politician, member of the New Jersey General Assembly (1998–2006).
- Manabendranath Saha, 57, Indian politician, MLA (2006–2011), suicide by hanging.
- Joel Skornicka, 82, American politician, Mayor of Madison, Wisconsin (1979–1983), blood clot.
- Johnny Wheeler, 91, English footballer (Bolton Wanderers, Liverpool, national team).
- Vera Zabala, 78, Puerto Rican philanthropist.
- Zeng Guoyuan, 66, Singaporean businessman and politician, fall.

=== 17 ===
- Nicholas Amer, 96, English actor (Henry VIII and His Six Wives, The Draughtsman's Contract, A Man for All Seasons).
- Jale Birsel, 92, Turkish actress.
- Jiřina Čermáková, 75, Czech field hockey player, Olympic silver medallist (1980).
- Susan Cernyak-Spatz, 97, Austrian-born American author and Holocaust survivor.
- Ed Chalupka, 72, Canadian football player (Hamilton Tiger-Cats) and administrator, President of the CFLPA (1981–1986).
- Arsenio Corsellas, 86, Spanish actor.
- Ben Humphreys, 85, Australian politician, MHR (1977–1996) and Minister for Veterans' Affairs (1987–1993).
- Nabil Kanso, 79, Lebanese-born American painter.
- Yıldız Kenter, 91, Turkish actress (Hanım, The Raindrop, Big Man, Little Love), lung disease.
- Jacek Kurzawiński, 57, Polish volleyball coach (national team).
- Alice McLerran, 86, American anthropologist and author.
- Dorothy Seymour Mills, 91, American baseball historian, complications from an ulcer.
- Kisinoti Mukwazhe, 49, Zimbabwean politician.
- Harley D. Nygren, 94, American rear admiral, director of the NOAA Corps (1970–1981).
- Adnan Pachachi, 96, Iraqi politician and diplomat, Minister of Foreign Affairs (1965–1967) and Acting Prime Minister (2004).
- Václav Pavkovič, 83, Czech rower, Olympic bronze medalist (1960).
- Gustav Peichl, 91, Austrian architect (ORF regional studios, Kunst- und Ausstellungshalle der Bundesrepublik Deutschland).
- Maximilian Raub, 93, Austrian sprint canoer, World champion (1954) and Olympic bronze medallist (1952, 1956).
- Tuka Rocha, 36, Brazilian race car driver, plane crash.
- Sir Keith Sykes, 94, British anaesthetist.
- Percy Tait, 90, English motorcycle racer.
- Debbie Thompson, 77, American Olympic sprinter (1964).
- Regina Tyshkevich, 90, Belarusian mathematician.
- John Wegner, 69, German-born Australian operatic baritone, Parkinson's disease.

=== 18 ===
- Bridget Adams, 91, British Olympic figure skater (1948).
- Norodom Buppha Devi, 76, Cambodian royal and prima ballerina, Minister of Culture and Fine Arts (1998–2004).
- Ryan Costello, 23, American baseball player (Pensacola Blue Wahoos).
- Sandrine Daudet, 47, French Olympic short track speed skater (1992, 1994).
- Sandra Easterbrook, 73, New Zealand netball player.
- John Gale, 65, English poker player.
- Gary Haberl, 54, Australian Olympic table-tennis player (1988).
- Laure Killing, 60, French actress (Beyond Therapy, Love After Love, The Teddy Bear) and comedian, cancer.
- Midori Kiuchi, 69, Japanese actress (Princess Comet, Tokugawa Ieyasu, Takekurabe), heart attack.
- Ching-Liang Lin, 88, Taiwanese physicist.
- Srboljub Markušević, 83, Yugoslav football player and manager (FK Sarajevo).
- Brad McQuaid, 50, American video game designer (EverQuest, Vanguard: Saga of Heroes).
- Sultan bin Zayed bin Sultan Al Nahyan, 62, Emirati royal, Deputy Prime Minister (1997–2009).
- Ethel Paley, 99, American social worker.
- Seshagiri Rao, 86, Indian politician, MLA (1994–1999).
- Argentina Santos, 95, Portuguese singer.
- Doug Smart, 82, American basketball player (Washington Huskies).
- Hyrum W. Smith, 76, American executive (FranklinCovey).

=== 19 ===
- John Abel, 80, Australian politician, member of the Australian House of Representatives (1975–1977).
- Ernesto Báez, 64, Colombian paramilitary leader (United Self-Defense Forces of Colombia), heart attack.
- José Mário Branco, 77, Portuguese singer-songwriter, actor and record producer.
- Purita Campos, 82, Spanish cartoonist, illustrator and painter.
- Basil Feldman, Baron Feldman, 96, British politician and businessman.
- Bob Hallberg, 75, American college basketball coach (St. Xavier University, Chicago State University, University of Illinois at Chicago).
- Joan Hester, 86, American politician.
- D. M. Jayaratne, 88, Sri Lankan politician, Prime Minister (2010–2015) and MP (1989–2015).
- Tom Lyle, 66, American comic book artist (Starman, Comet, Peter Parker: Spider-Man).
- Qian Jiaqi, 80, Chinese nephrologist.
- Fazlollah Reza, 104, Iranian professor, scientist and scholar, ambassador to UNESCO (1969–1974) and Canada (1974–1978).
- Martinus Dogma Situmorang, 73, Indonesian Roman Catholic prelate, Bishop of Padang (since 1983).
- Colin Skipp, 80, British actor (The Archers).
- Gabriel Stolzenberg, 82, American mathematician.
- Rémy Stricker, 83, French pianist and musicologist.
- Lech Szczucki, 86, Polish historian.
- Colin Tatz, 85, South African-born Australian historian.
- Lloyd Watson, 70, English rock guitarist.
- Jusup Wilkosz, 71, German bodybuilder.
- Wee Willie Walker, 77, American soul and blues singer.
- Manoucher Yektai, 97, Iranian-American artist (New York School).
- Barbara Zuber, 93, American painter.

=== 20 ===
- Fábio Barreto, 62, Brazilian film director (Lula, Son of Brazil, O Quatrilho), complications from traffic collision.
- Tony Brooker, 94, British computer scientist.
- Charles Brumskine, 68, Liberian politician, President pro tempore of the Senate (1997–1999).
- Jake Burton Carpenter, 65, American snowboarder, founder of Burton Snowboards, cancer.
- Jordan Cekov, 98, Macedonian partisan and journalist.
- Fred Cox, 80, American football player (Minnesota Vikings), co-inventor of Nerf football.
- Bertha Díaz, 83, Cuban Olympic athlete (1956, 1960).
- Zoltán Dömötör, 84, Hungarian water polo player, Olympic champion (1964).
- Du Ruiqing, 75, Chinese translator and educator, President of Xi'an Foreign Languages Institute (1998–2005).
- Almaas Elman, Somali-born Canadian peace and human rights activist, shot.
- Mary L. Good, 88, American inorganic chemist, acting Secretary of Commerce (1996).
- Mari-Luci Jaramillo, 91, American diplomat, ambassador to Honduras (1977–1980).
- Andrew Jin Daoyuan, 90, Chinese Patriotic Catholic Association prelate, Bishop of Lu’an (since 2000).
- Meddie Kaggwa, 64, Ugandan lawyer and politician, Chairman of the Uganda Human Rights Commission (since 2009).
- Peter Kattuk, 69, Canadian politician, MLA (1999–2008).
- Amos Lapidot, 85, Israeli fighter pilot, Commander of the Israeli Air Force (1982–1987), and president of Technion.
- Doug Lubahn, 71, American rock bassist (Clear Light, The Doors, Billy Squier).
- Elmer Maddux, 85, American politician, member of the Oklahoma House of Representatives (1988–2004).
- John Mann, 57, Canadian guitarist and singer (Spirit of the West), and actor (Underworld: Evolution).
- John Martin, 80, American racing driver.
- Wataru Misaka, 95, American basketball player (New York Knicks).
- Linda Orange, 69, American politician, member of the Connecticut House of Representatives (since 1997), pancreatic cancer.
- Michael J. Pollard, 80, American actor (Bonnie and Clyde, Scrooged, House of 1000 Corpses), cardiac arrest.
- Qiu Shusen, 82, Chinese historian, specialist in the history of the Yuan dynasty and the Hui people.
- Darren Servatius, 54, Canadian ice hockey player (Johnstown Chiefs), complications from diabetes.
- Alastair Smith, 70, New Zealand library and information science academic (Victoria University of Wellington).
- Alfred E. Smith IV, 68, American securities and healthcare executive (Bear Stearns, St. Vincent's Catholic Medical Center) and philanthropist (Al Smith Dinner).
- Jim Wade, 84, American football player (New York Bulldogs).
- Marilyn Yalom, 87, American feminist author and historian, multiple myeloma.
- Dorel Zugrăvescu, 88, Romanian geophysicist.

=== 21 ===
- Roger C. Alperin, 72, American mathematician.
- Karl Bierschel, 87, German Olympic ice hockey player (1952, 1956).
- Yaşar Büyükanıt, 79, Turkish general, Chief of Staff (2006–2008).
- Donna Carson, 73, American folk singer (Hedge and Donna).
- Wally Clark, 92, New Zealand zoologist (University of Canterbury).
- Cui Yi, 89, Chinese lieutenant general, Deputy Political Commissar of COSTIND.
- Bahtiar Effendy, 60, Indonesian Islamic scholar and activist.
- Sir Donald Gordon, 89, South African property developer, founder of Liberty International.
- Bengt-Erik Grahn, 78, Swedish Olympic alpine skier (1964, 1968).
- James Griffin, 86, American philosopher.
- Val Heim, 99, American baseball player (Chicago White Sox).
- Ray Kappe, 92, American architect, founder of Southern California Institute of Architecture.
- John Kastner, 73, Canadian documentary film director (Life with Murder, NCR: Not Criminally Responsible, Out of Mind, Out of Sight) and screenwriter.
- Andrée Lachapelle, 88, Canadian actress (Léolo, Cap Tourmente, Route 132), assisted suicide.
- Barbara Mandel, 93, American activist (National Council of Jewish Women) and philanthropist (Cooper-Hewitt, Smithsonian Design Museum).
- Albertina Martínez Burgos, 38, Chilean photojournalist.
- Anton Mavretič, 84, Slovene electrical engineer.
- Oppe Quiñonez, 86, Paraguayan footballer (Nacional Asunción, national team).
- Nigel Richards, 74, British major general, cancer.
- Toshio Saeki, 74, Japanese artist.
- William Seale, 79–80, American historian and author.
- George Springate, 81, Canadian football player (Montreal Alouettes) and politician, MNA (1970–1981).
- Gahan Wilson, 89, American cartoonist (Everybody's Favorite Duck, A Night in the Lonesome October, Spooky Stories for a Dark and Stormy Night).

=== 22 ===
- Michael Breaugh, 77, Canadian politician, MP (1990–1993).
- Duncan Archibald Bruce, 87, American author.
- Tony Bull, 89, Australian football player (Melbourne).
- Eugène Camara, 77, Guinean politician, Prime Minister (2007).
- Sir Stephen Cleobury, 70, English organist, director of the Choir of King's College, Cambridge (1982–2019).
- Jean Douchet, 90, French film critic, actor and director.
- Eddie Duran, 94, American jazz guitarist.
- Gaston Durnez, 91, Belgian author and journalist.
- David Erb, 95, American jockey.
- Martin Geck, 83, German musicologist.
- David Gibson, 68, American professional Scrabble player, complications from pancreatic cancer.
- Jasper Griffin, 82, British classical scholar, pneumonia.
- Sean Haslegrave, 68, English footballer (Preston North End, Crewe Alexandra, York City).
- He Jing, 84, Chinese hydraulic engineer and politician, Chief Engineer and Vice Minister of the Ministry of Water Resources.
- Shaukat Kaifi, 91, Indian actress (Naina, Umrao Jaan, Salaam Bombay!).
- Andreas Karlsböck, 59, Austrian politician, member of the National Council (2008–2017).
- Daniel Leclercq, 70, French football player and manager (RC Lens, Olympique de Marseille), pulmonary embolism.
- Gugu Liberato, 60, Brazilian television presenter, fall.
- Make A Stand, 28, British racehorse, 1997 Champion Hurdle winner.
- Chris Moncrieff, 88, British journalist, political editor of the Press Association (1980–1994).
- Joaquim Moutinho, 67, Portuguese rally driver, Rally de Portugal winner (1986).
- Max Müller, 103, Swiss Olympic cross-country skier.
- Eduardo Nascimento, 76, Angolan singer ("O vento mudou").
- Harvey C. Nathanson, 83, American electrical engineer.
- Kaare R. Norum, 86, Norwegian academic, rector of the University of Oslo.
- David O'Morchoe, 89, British major general.
- Pat Philley, 90, Canadian soccer player.
- Vicky Randall, 74, English political scientist.
- Antti Rantakangas, 55, Finnish politician, MP (since 1999).
- Gurram Yadagiri Reddy, 91, Indian politician, MLA (1985–1999).
- Cecilia Seghizzi, 111, Italian composer and painter.
- Henry Sobel, 75, Portuguese-born Brazilian-American reform rabbi, cancer.
- Bowen Stassforth, 93, American swimmer, Olympic silver medalist (1952).
- Bill Waterhouse, 97, Australian bookmaker.
- Warren Wolf, 92, American high school football coach and politician, member of the New Jersey General Assembly (1981–1983).

=== 23 ===
- Bai Dezhang, 88, Chinese film actor (Visitors on the Icy Mountain) and director.
- Asunción Balaguer, 94, Spanish actress (El canto del gallo, The Witching Hour, The Bird of Happiness), stroke.
- Josep Maria Beal, 77, Andorran politician, General Syndic (1990–1991) and Mayor of Escaldes-Engordany (1984–1989).
- Terry Board, 74, Australian footballer (Carlton).
- Will Brunson, 49, American baseball player (Los Angeles Dodgers, Detroit Tigers), heart attack.
- Leo Chamberlain, 79, English Roman Catholic priest and headmaster (Ampleforth College).
- Bikash Chowdhury, 81, Indian cricketer.
- Olly Croft, 90, British darts administrator, founder of the British Darts Organisation.
- Marilyn Farquhar, 91, American cellular biologist.
- Francesc Gambús, 45, Spanish politician, MEP (2014–2019).
- Kenneth H. Gould, 81, American politician.
- Barbara Hillary, 88, American adventurer, first black woman to reach both poles.
- Doris Howell, 94, American physician.
- Enrique Iturriaga, 101, Peruvian composer.
- Wayne Jones, 65, American politician.
- Ants Leemets, 69, Estonian politician and museum curator, Deputy Mayor of Tallinn (1996–2001) and Minister without portfolio (1995).
- Catherine Small Long, 95, American politician, member of the U.S. House of Representatives (1985–1987), dementia.
- Banshilal Mahto, 79, Indian politician, MP (2014–2019), liver disease.
- Texe Marrs, 75, American conspiracy theorist, radio host and fundamentalist Christian minister.
- Harry Morton, 38, American restaurateur, founder of Pink Taco.
- Shirley Gordon Olafsson, 92, Canadian Olympic athlete (1948).
- Marilyn Saviola, 74, American disability rights activist.
- Liu Shahe, 88, Chinese writer and poet, complications from throat cancer.
- Walter Spink, 91, American art historian.
- Patrice Tirolien, 73, French politician, MP (1995–1997) and MEP (2009–2014).

=== 24 ===
- Billy Bell, 96, Canadian football player (Toronto Argonauts).
- Jean-Paul Benzécri, 87, French statistician.
- Hank Bullough, 85, American football player (Green Bay Packers) and coach (New England Patriots, Buffalo Bills).
- William A. Connelly, 88, American sergeant major.
- Dumitru Cuc, 91, Romanian Olympic wrestler.
- Robert Godshall, 86, American politician, member of the Pennsylvania House of Representatives (1983–2019).
- Goo Hara, 28, South Korean singer (Kara) and actress (City Hunter), suicide.
- Kshiti Goswami, 76, Indian politician, MLA (1991–2001, 2006–2011).
- J. Bruce Jacobs, 76, American-born Australian orientalist, cancer.
- Clive James, 80, Australian author (Cultural Amnesia), broadcaster (Clive James's Postcard from..., Fame in the 20th Century) and critic, leukaemia.
- Kailash Chandra Joshi, 90, Indian politician, MP (2000–2014) and Chief Minister of Madhya Pradesh (1977–1978).
- Mobarak Hossain Khan, 81, Bangladeshi musicologist, musician, and writer.
- Nelson P. W. Khonje, 95, Malawian politician, Speaker of the National Assembly (1975–1987).
- Lee Kim Sai, 82, Malaysian politician, MP (1986–1995) and Labour Minister (1986–1989).
- Werner Kutzelnigg, 86, Austrian chemist.
- Colin Mawby, 83, English organist, composer and conductor.
- Takashi Miyahara, 85, Japanese-Nepalese tour operator and politician, founder of Nepal Rastriya Bikas Party.
- Dion Neutra, 93, American architect (Neutra VDL Studio and Residences) and preservationist.
- Juan Orrego-Salas, 100, Chilean-born American composer.
- Nimish Pilankar, 29, Indian sound editor (Race 3, Kesari, Housefull 4), brain haemorrhage.
- Yehoshua Porath, 81, Israeli historian.
- Anil Raj, 35, American UNDP human rights activist and Amnesty International board member.
- Noemí Rial, 72, Argentine lawyer and politician, Secretary of Labour (2002-2015).
- Cynthia Cary Van Pelt Russell, 95, American socialite.
- Robert F. X. Sillerman, 71, American broadcasting and live event executive (SFX Entertainment).
- John Simon, 94, Serbian-born American theater and film critic (New York).
- Joan Staley, 79, American model and actress (The Untouchables, 77 Sunset Strip, The Ghost and Mr. Chicken), heart failure.
- Narayan Rao Tarale, 83, Indian politician, MLA (1994–1999).
- Lyudmila Verbitskaya, 83, Russian linguist, Rector (1994–2008) and President (since 2008) of Saint Petersburg State University.
- Ed Weisacosky, 75, American football player (Miami Dolphins, New York Giants, New England Patriots).
- Frank E. Young, 88, American physician, Commissioner of Food and Drugs (1984–1989).

=== 25 ===
- Frank Biondi, 74, American film and television executive, CEO of HBO (1983), Viacom (1987–1996) and Universal Studios (1996–1998), bladder cancer.
- André Bisson, 90, Canadian academic and executive.
- Joseph Bordogna, 86, American scientist and engineer.
- Chang Jen-hu, 92, Taiwanese geographer.
- George Clements, 87, American Roman Catholic priest and civil rights activist, heart attack.
- Héctor García-Molina, 66, Mexican-born American computer scientist.
- Martin Harvey, 78, Northern Irish footballer (Sunderland, national team).
- János Horváth, 98, Hungarian politician, MP (1945–1947, 1998–2014).
- Bevin Hough, 90, New Zealand rugby league player (Auckland, national team) and long jumper, British Empire Games silver medalist (1950).
- Larry Hurtado, 75, American New Testament scholar.
- Charlot Jeudy, 34, Haitian LGBT activist.
- Terry Kelly, 85, Irish hurler.
- Nobuaki Kobayashi, 77, Japanese three-cushion billiards player, two-time world champion.
- Carolyn Konheim, 81, American environmental activist.
- Franz Lichtblau, 91, German architect.
- Muiris Mac Conghail, 78, Irish journalist.
- Bill McCreary Sr., 84, Canadian ice hockey player (St. Louis Blues, Montreal Canadiens, New York Rangers).
- Keith L. Moore, 94, Canadian anatomist.
- Pete Musser, 92, American investor and philanthropist, cardiac arrest.
- Alain Porthault, 90, French Olympic sprinter (1948, 1952) and rugby player (national team, Racing 92).
- Jay Powell, 67, American politician, member of the Georgia House of Representatives (since 2008).
- Garth C. Reeves Sr., 100, Bahamian-born American newspaper publisher (The Miami Times).
- Jimmy Schulz, 51, German politician, member of the Bundestag (2009–2013, since 2017).
- Iain Sutherland, 71, Scottish musician (The Sutherland Brothers) and songwriter ("(I Don't Want to Love You But) You Got Me Anyway", "Arms of Mary").
- Tsebin Tchen, 78, Chinese-born Australian politician, Senator (1999–2005), traffic collision.
- Goar Vartanian, 93, Soviet-Armenian spy, uncovered Operation Long Jump.
- Chuck White, 78, American basketball coach.
- Michael Wright, British academic.

=== 26 ===
- Jack Ady, 86, Canadian politician.
- Al Bunge, 82, American basketball player.
- Cyrus Chothia, 77, English biochemist.
- Gulzar Ahmed Chowdhury, Bangladeshi politician, MP (1996).
- Vittorio Congia, 89, Italian actor (5 marines per 100 ragazze, Shivers in Summer, Obiettivo ragazze).
- Howard Cruse, 75, American cartoonist and comic book writer (Stuck Rubber Baby), cancer.
- Sudhir Dar, 87, Indian cartoonist.
- Thakur Prithvi Singh Deora, 85, Indian politician, MLA (1967–1972).
- Yeshi Dhonden, 92, Tibetan physician and humanitarian, founder of the Men-Tsee-Khang, respiratory failure.
- Herb Granath, 91, American sportscaster.
- James L. Holloway III, 97, American admiral, Chief of Naval Operations (1974–1978).
- Rabiul Hussain, 76, Bangladeshi architect and writer.
- Ken Kavanagh, 95, Australian motorcycle racer.
- Köbi Kuhn, 76, Swiss football player (Zürich, national team) and manager.
- Juan Lombardo, 92, Argentine vice admiral.
- William E. Macaulay, 74, American investment executive, chairman of First Reserve Corporation, and financer of the William E. Macaulay Honors College, heart attack.
- Bruno Nicolè, 79, Italian footballer (Juventus, Roma, national team).
- Phil Nugent, 80, American football player.
- Barry O'Donnell, 93, Irish pediatric surgeon.
- Gerald Regan, 91, Canadian politician, MP (1963–1965, 1980–1984) and Premier of Nova Scotia (1970–1978).
- Dan Reisinger, 85, Israeli graphic designer and artist.
- Gary Rhodes, 59, English chef (Rhodes W1) and television personality (MasterChef, Local Food Hero), subdural haematoma.
- Osvaldo Romberg, 81, Argentine artist.
- Alfred Streun, 94, Swiss Olympic ice hockey player.
- Karel Werner, 94, Czech-born British philosopher and religious scholar.
- Yin Xiaowei, 46, Chinese materials scientist.

=== 27 ===
- Martin Armiger, 70, Australian musician (The Sports) and composer (Young Einstein, Cody), genetic lung condition.
- Ciputra, 88, Indonesian property developer and philanthropist.
- Louie Crew, 82, American academic and LGBT rights activist.
- Stefan Danailov, 76, Bulgarian actor (Ladies' Choice, Affection, Something Out of Nothing) and politician, Minister of Culture (2005–2009), lymphoma.
- Terry de Havilland, 81, British shoe designer.
- Walter DeVries, 90, American political consultant and author.
- Clay Evans, 94, American pastor and civil rights advocate.
- Maarit Feldt-Ranta, 51, Finnish politician, MP (2007–2019), stomach cancer.
- Svatoslav Galík, 81, Czech competitive orienteer.
- Godfrey Gao, 35, Taiwanese-Canadian model and actor (The Mortal Instruments: City of Bones, Love is a Broadway Hit, Legend of the Ancient Sword), cardiac arrest.
- Brad Gobright, 31, American rock climber, climbing fall.
- Hà Văn Tấn, 82, Vietnamese historian.
- Jaegwon Kim, 85, South Korean-American philosopher.
- Sushil Kumar, 79, Indian admiral, Chief of the Naval Staff (1998–2001).
- Elio Locatelli, 76, Italian Olympic speed skater (1964, 1968).
- Kutub Ahmed Mazumder, 80, Indian politician, MLA (2006–2011).
- Tom McHugh, 87, American football player (Notre Dame Fighting Irish, Ottawa Rough Riders) and coach.
- Sir Jonathan Miller, 85, English humourist (Beyond the Fringe), television presenter, and theatre director, Alzheimer's disease.
- Bridglal Pachai, 91, South African-born Canadian educator and historian.
- Agnes Baker Pilgrim, 95, American Takelma elder and activist, brain aneurysm.
- John B. Robbins, 86, American medical researcher.
- William Ruckelshaus, 87, American attorney, Deputy Attorney General (1973), Acting Director of FBI (1973) and Administrator of EPA (1970–1973, 1983–1985).
- Ghazi Sial, 86, Pakistani poet.
- Bala Singh, 67, Indian actor (Avatharam, Kaama, Pudhupettai), food poisoning.
- John Henry Waddell, 98, American sculptor and painter.
- Sam Watson, 67, Australian indigenous activist and writer.

=== 28 ===
- Ernest Cabo, 86, French Roman Catholic prelate, Bishop of Basse-Terre (1984–2008).
- Ratna Ram Chaudhary, 90, Indian politician, MLA (1977–1985, 1990–1993, 1998–2003).
- Cilinho, 80, Brazilian football manager (São Paulo FC, Corinthians, Ponte Preta).
- Andrew Clements, 70, American children's author (Frindle, A Week in the Woods, Things Not Seen), proto-COVID.
- Graham Crouch, 71, Australian Olympic middle-distance runner (1976).
- Padú del Caribe, 99, Aruban musician and songwriter ("Aruba Dushi Tera").
- Philip Donnelly, 70, Irish guitarist.
- Christopher Finzi, 85, British orchestral conductor.
- Grethe G. Fossum, 74, Norwegian politician, MP (1997–2001).
- Bjarke Gundlev, 88, Danish footballer (AGF, national team).
- Dorcas Hardy, 73, American administrator, Commissioner of the Social Security Administration (1986–1989).
- Drago Kovačević, 66, Croatian Serb politician and writer, Mayor of Knin (1994–1995).
- Pamela Lincoln, 82, American actress (Love of Life, The Doctors).
- Marion McClinton, 65, American theatre director (Jitney, King Hedley II) and playwright, kidney failure.
- John McKissick, 93, American Hall of Fame football coach (Summerville High School).
- Jorge Monge, 81, Costa Rican footballer (Saprissa, national team).
- Jan Nygren, 85, Swedish actor (Världens bästa Karlsson, The Brothers Lionheart, Den ofrivillige golfaren).
- Juan Carlos Scannone, 88, Italian-Argentine Roman Catholic Jesuit priest.
- Kermit Staggers, 72, American politician, member of the South Dakota Senate (1995–2002).
- John Strohmayer, 73, American baseball player (Montreal Expos, New York Mets).
- Endel Taniloo, 96, Estonian sculptor.
- Tiny Ron Taylor, 72, American actor (The Rocketeer, Ace Ventura: Pet Detective) and basketball player (New York Nets).
- Pim Verbeek, 63, Dutch football manager (South Korea, Australia, Oman), cancer.
- Gene Warren Jr., 78, American visual effects artist (Terminator 2: Judgment Day, Bram Stoker's Dracula, The Abyss), Oscar winner (1992).

=== 29 ===
- Ruth Anderson, 91, American composer, lung cancer.
- Nancy Boggess, 94, American astrophysicist.
- Irving Burgie, 95, American Hall of Fame songwriter ("Day-O (The Banana Boat Song)", "Jamaica Farewell", "In Plenty and In Time of Need").
- Michael Howard, 96, American actor.
- Makio Inoue, 80, Japanese voice actor (Astro Boy, Captain Harlock, Lupin the Third).
- Joseph Anthony Irudayaraj, 84, Indian Roman Catholic prelate, Bishop of the Dharmapuri (1997–2012).
- Tony Karalius, 76, English rugby league player (St Helens, Wigan, Great Britain national team).
- Usman Khan, 28, British terrorist, perpetrator of the 2019 London Bridge stabbing, shot.
- Serge Lindier, 67, French comic book artist.
- Roman Malek, 68, Polish-born German professor and sinologist.
- Fitzhugh Mullan, 77, American physician, medical writer and professor at George Washington University.
- Yasuhiro Nakasone, 101, Japanese politician, Prime Minister (1982–1987) and MP (1947–2004).
- Julio Nazareno, 83, Argentinian jurist, President of the Supreme Court (1993–1994, 1994–2003), pulmonary disease.
- Lina M. Obeid, 64, American physician and cancer researcher, complications from lung cancer.
- Seymour Siwoff, 99, American sports statistician, owner of the Elias Sports Bureau (1952–2018).
- Buddy Terry, 78, American jazz saxophonist.
- R-Kal Truluck, 45, American football player (Saskatchewan Roughriders, Kansas City Chiefs), complications from amyotrophic lateral sclerosis.
- Phil Wyman, 74, American politician, member of the California State Assembly (1978–1992, 2000–2002) and Senate (1993–1995).

=== 30 ===
- Ralph Anderson, 92, American politician, member of the South Carolina Senate (1997–2013) and House of Representatives (1991–1997).
- Elizabeth Arrieta, 57, Uruguayan engineer and politician, Deputy (since 2015), traffic collision.
- Amnon Buchbinder, 61, American-born Canadian screenwriter and film director (Whole New Thing, The Fishing Trip), cancer.
- Cai Shaoqing, 86, Chinese historian, authority on Chinese secret societies.
- Doug Cox, 62, Australian football player (St Kilda Football Club).
- A. Hunter Dupree, 98, American historian.
- Bertil Fiskesjö, 91, Swedish politician, MP (1971–1994).
- Graziano Gasparini, 95, Venezuelan architect.
- Odette Grzegrzulka, 72, French politician.
- Concha Hidalgo, 95, Spanish actress (Goya's Ghosts, Matador, Aída, La que se avecina)
- Sir Michael Howard, 97, English historian, co-founder of the International Institute for Strategic Studies.
- Petr Málek, 58, Czech sport shooter, Olympic silver medallist (2000).
- Doris Merrick, 100, American actress (Girl Trouble, That Other Woman, The Big Noise) and model, heart failure.
- Laxminarayan Nayak, 101, Indian politician, MLA (1957–1962, 1972–1977), MP (1977–1980).
- Tejumola Olaniyan, 60, Nigerian academic, heart failure.
- Ou Tangliang, 105, Chinese journalist, politician and diplomat.
- Daniel Poliziani, 84, Canadian ice hockey player (Boston Bruins).
- Harold Rahm, 100, American-Brazilian Roman Catholic priest.
- Raeanne Rubenstein, 74, American photographer.
- Milagrosa Tan, 61, Filipino politician, Governor of Samar (2001–2010, since 2019), cardiac arrest.
- Brian Tierney, 97, British historian and medievalist.
- Harriet Zinnes, 100, American poet and author.
