= Zhang Qi =

Zhang Qi may refer to:

- Zhang Qi (Song dynasty) (died 1048), Chinese official and military general during the Song dynasty
- Zhang Qi, father of Empress Zhang (Hongxi) (d. 1442) of the Ming Dynasty
- Zhang Qi (physician) (1922–2019), Chinese physician and professor
- Zhang Qi (politician, born 1961), former Party Secretary of Haikou
- Zhang Qi (shot putter) (born 1984), Chinese shot putter
- Zhang Qi (boccia) (born 1990), Chinese boccia player
- Zhang Qi (wrestler) (born 1998), Chinese freestyle wrestler
