= Joel Shatzky =

American writer and professor (1943–2020)

- Born: November 30, 1943; Vancouver, Washington
- Died: April 3, 2020 (aged 76); Brooklyn, New York
- Occupations: writer, professor

Joel Shatzky (November 30, 1943 – April 3, 2020) was an American writer and literary professor at the State University of New York.

== Biography ==
Shatzky, who grew up in the Bronx, attended High School of Music & Art. He studied at Queens College, obtained a master's degree from the University of Chicago in 1965 and a doctoral degree in dramatic literature from the New York University in 1970. From 1968 until his retirement in 2005, he taught at the State University of New York.

His play It's a Clean, Well-lighted Place was published in 1976 at the Theater des Londoner Institute of Contemporary Arts. The play The Day They Traded Seaver was performed in 1979 by Soho Artists under the direction of Dino Narrizano. Several one-act plays were then performed at the Thirteenth Street Rep and the One Dream Theater . Other pieces have been produced in Philadelphia, San Francisco and at the Improv Theater in Los Angeles.

With his wife Dorothy, Shatzky wrote the book Facing Multiple Sclerosis: Our Longest Journey (1999). His novel Iago’s Tale was published in 2002. In cooperation with Michael Taub the standard works Contemporary Jewish-American Novelists (1997) and Contemporary Jewish-American Dramatists and Poets (1999) were written. The former was recognized by the magazine Choice as "Outstanding Book of 1997". His preoccupation with the history of the Holocaust led to the publication of the memories of the Holocaust survivors Susan Cernyak-Spatz ("Protective Custody Prisoner 34042") and Norbert Troller ("Theresienstadt: Hitler's "Gift" to the Jews).

Shatzky died from complications of COVID-19 on April 3, 2020.

== Works ==
- Hrsg.: Norbert Troller Theresienstadt: Hitler’s “Gift” to the Jews 1991
- with Michael Taub: Contemporary Jewish-American Novelists 1997
- with Michael Taub: Contemporary Jewish-American Dramatists and Poets 1999
- mit Dorothy Shatzky: Facing Multiple Sclerosis: Our Longest Journey, 1999
- mit Ellen Hill: The Thinking Crisis: The Disconnection of Teaching and Learning in Today’s Schools 2001
- Iago’s Tale: A Novel 2002
- Well of Evil (Young Adult Novel) 2004
- Common Sense: What America Must Do to Save Democracy (with a foreword by Stephen Bronner), 2004
- Hrsg.: Susan Cernyak-Spatz Protective Custody Prisoner 34042 2005
- with Joanne Napoli: Eternal Duet: The Story of Robert and Clara Schumann, 2005
- Option Three: A Novel about the University, 2005
- Intelligent Design: A Fable Science-Fiction-Roman 2007
