= Cui Yi =

Cui Yi or Yi Cui may refer to:

- Cui Yi (general), Chinese general
- Cui Yi (actor), Chinese actor.
- Yi Cui (scientist), Chinese-American scientist
