= Zhang Min =

Zhang Min may refer to:

- Zhang Min (figure skater) (born 1976), Chinese figure skater
- Zhang Min (rower) (born 1993), Chinese rower
- Zhang Min (politician), Chinese official in the Ministry of Human Resources and Social Security
- Zhang Qi (Song dynasty) (died 1048), or Zhang Min, Song dynasty official and military general
- Sharla Cheung (born 1968), or Zhang Min, Hong Kong actress
- Aman Chang, or Zhang Min, Hong Kong film director
