= Bali Assembly constituency =

Legislative Assembly constituency in Rajasthan State, India

Coordinates: 25.19°N 73.29°E

Bali
- Constituency No. 120 for the Rajasthan Legislative Assembly

Constituency details
- Country: India
- Region: North India
- State: Rajasthan
- District: Pali
- Lok Sabha constituency: Pali
- Established: 1951
- Total electors: 332,830
- Reservation: None

Member of Legislative Assembly
- 16th Rajasthan Legislative Assembly
- Incumbent Pushpendra Singh
- Party: Bharatiya Janata Party
- Elected year: 2018

Bali Assembly constituency is one of the 200 Legislative Assembly constituencies of Rajasthan state in India. It is in Pali district and is part of Pali Lok Sabha constituency.

== Members of the Legislative Assembly ==
Election	Name	Party
1951	Laxman Singh	Independent
1957	Moti s/o Mula	Independent
1957	Deva	Indian National Congress
1962	Mohan Raj Jain	Indian National Congress
1967	Thakur Prithvi Singh Deora	Swatantra Party
1972	Mohan Raj Jain	Indian National Congress
1977	Hanwant Singh	Janata Party
1980	Aslam Khan	Indian National Congress
1985	Raghunath	Indian National Congress
1990	Amrat Lal	Independent
1993	Bhairon Singh Shekhawat	Bharatiya Janata Party
1998	Bhairon Singh Shekhawat	Bharatiya Janata Party
2002 (By Poll)	Pushpendra Singh Ranawat	Bharatiya Janata Party
2003	Pushpendra Singh Ranawat	Bharatiya Janata Party
2008	Pushpendra Singh Ranawat	Bharatiya Janata Party
2013	Pushpendra Singh Ranawat	Bharatiya Janata Party
2018	Pushpendra Singh Ranawat	Bharatiya Janata Party
2023	Pushpendra Singh Ranawat	Bharatiya Janata Party

== Election results ==
=== 2023 ===
2023 Rajasthan Legislative Assembly election: Bali
Party	Candidate	Votes	%	±%
BJP	Pushpendra Singh	107,938	48.62	−0.38
INC	Badriram Jakhar	97,445	43.89	
AAP	Lal Singh Dewasi	5,823	2.62	
ASP(KR)	Shailesh Kumar Mousalpuriya	2,735	1.23	
NOTA	None of the above	3,144	1.42	−1.3
Majority		10,493	4.73	−9.62
Turnout		222,020	66.71	+2.06
BJP hold		Swing		

=== 2018 ===
Rajasthan Legislative Assembly Election, 2018: Bali
Party	Candidate	Votes	%	±%
BJP	Pushpendra Singh	96,238	49.0	
NCP	Ummed Singh	68,051	34.65	
Bharat Vahini Party	Rajugiri Ji	5,616	2.86	
Independent	Indu Choudhary	5,414	2.76	
Independent	Shailesh Kumar Mousalpuriya	3,479	1.77	
Independent	Jaipal Singh	3,270	1.66	
Abhinav Rajasthan Party	Mahendra Kumar	2,920	1.49	
BSP	Danaram Meena	2,796	1.42	
NOTA	None of the above	5,334	2.72	
Majority		28,187	14.35	
Turnout		196,399	64.65	

== See also ==
- List of constituencies of the Rajasthan Legislative Assembly
- Pali district
