= Ore Falomo =

Nigerian physician (1942–2019)

Oluwatamilore Akinlade “Ore” Falomo (4 April 1942 – 9 November 2019) was a Nigerian physician, consultant obstetrician and gynaecologist, democracy advocate, and philanthropist. He gained national prominence as the personal physician to Chief Moshood Kashimawo Olawale (MKO) Abiola, Nigeria’s acclaimed winner of the annulled June 12, 1993 presidential election. A leader within Nigeria’s medical community, Falomo held multiple roles in the Nigerian Medical Association (NMA), directed Maryland Specialist Hospital, and was a vocal advocate for justice, democracy, and health sector reform.

== Early life and education ==
Falomo was born on 4 April 1942 in Minna, Niger State, to Chief Oluwagbohun Akinremi Falomo and Rebecca Falomo. He was the fourth of ten children. His siblings are Femi, Bunmi, Remi, Jimi, Segun, Dupe, Wemimo, Seye, and Bukola.

He attended Baptist Primary School in Ijaye from 1948 and Methodist Boys’ High School, Lagos from 1956. In 1961, he moved to Ireland, where he studied at St. Andrew’s College, Dublin, before enrolling in the Royal College of Surgeons in Ireland, where he earned his medical degree between 1962 and 1968. He later obtained further qualifications from the Royal College of Surgeons, Dublin in 1978.

== Medical career ==
Falomo trained and practiced both in the United Kingdom and Nigeria to become an obstetrician and gynaecologist. His early career included a House Officer post at Park Hospital, Davyhulme, Manchester. Upon his return to Nigeria, he served as a medical officer of Obstetrics and Gynaecology in the Surulere Health Centre, Ikeja's General Hospital, as well as becoming registrar at the Lagos Island Maternity Hospital.

In 1974, he established the Onikoyi Clinic in Yaba, Lagos, and served as its Medical Director until 1979. In 1980, he founded Maryland Specialist Hospital in Lagos, where he worked as its Chief Medical Director until his death in 2019. In his later life, Falomo was appointed chairman of both the Nigerian Association of Resident Doctors and the NMA in Lagos, where he also served as its national treasurer. Moreover, he was also designated a representative (and later a board member) of the NMA to the Management Board of Lagos University Teaching Hospital (LUTH), the deputy chairman for the Board of Trustees of the National Youth Service Corps (NYSC) Mobile Clinic, and the chairman of the Board of Governors at Falomo High School. From 1990, Falomo served as a medical adviser to the African Church Organisation of Nigeria. He was a long-time member of the British Medical Association and the Irish Medical Association since 1968.

== Honours and awards ==
Dr. Falomo received several professional honours, including the Western Nigerian Scholarship in 1964, the Prestigious Grand Award issued by the University of Ibadan Medical Students' Association, and the Roll of Honour from the NMA.

== Political advocacy ==
Falomo made significant advances in negotiating improved pay and working conditions for Nigerian doctors through the 1974 Udoji Awards. He represented Nigeria at international medical forums in Chicago and London during the early 1980s.

A lifelong friend and personal physician to MKO Abiola, Falomo was a central figure during Abiola’s incarceration following the annulled 1993 presidential election. He provided medical care to Abiola during his detention and was present at several critical moments prior to Abiola’s death in 1998. He expressed strong skepticism about the official explanation for Abiola’s collapse and ensured that the autopsy was performed in Lagos for transparency.

Falomo openly criticized then military ruler Ibrahim Babangida over Abiola’s prolonged detention and condemned President Olusegun Obasanjo for failing to recognize Abiola's democratic victory. He referred to Obasanjo as “a bad student” of the June 12 legacy. His boldness won admiration from pro-democracy activists and leaders, including Bola Tinubu, Chief Ayo Adebanjo, and Senator Femi Okurounmu.

== Personal life ==
Falomo was active socially and was a member of the Ikoyi Club 1938, Lagos Country Club, Ikeja, and the Anthony Rotary Club. His hobbies included table tennis, travelling, and hunting. He was a devout Christian. Pastor Ituah Ighodalo remembered him as a disciplined and moral leader.

In a well-known anecdote, Dr. Falomo challenged Afrobeat icon Fela Kuti’s belief in protective charms by shooting a goat wearing one, which survived. Fela recounted the story during his own imprisonment, noting that it changed his views on traditional spiritual protection.

== Death ==
Dr. Falomo died on 9 November 2019 at St. Nicholas Hospital, Lagos, after a brief illness. He was honoured with a lying in state ceremony at LUTH, and his funeral was attended by notable dignitaries, including Vice President Yemi Osinbajo, Governor Babajide Sanwo-Olu, Governor Dapo Abiodun, and Bola Tinubu.
