= Fred Wain (Australian footballer) =

Australian rules footballer (1928–2019)

Personal information
- Full name: Fred Wain
- Born: 6 June 1928
- Died: 6 November 2019 (aged 91)
- Original team: Balwyn
- Height: 183 cm (6 ft 0 in)
- Weight: 83 kg (183 lb)

Playing career^{1}
Years	Club	Games (Goals)
1949–50, 1952	Hawthorn	34 (8)
- ^{1} Playing statistics correct to the end of 1952.

Fred Wain (6 June 1928 – 6 November 2019) was an Australian rules footballer who played with Hawthorn in the Victorian Football League (VFL).
