= Ion Dediu =

Moldovan biologist (1934–2019)

Ion Dediu (24 June 1934 – 3 November 2019) was a Moldovan biologist specialized in ecology, and a member of the CPSU, who was elected as a corresponding member of the Academy of Sciences of Moldova.

He was the Minister of Environment in 1990–1994. He was a professor at many universities in Moldova and wrote more than 400 scientific papers.

== Biography ==
Dediu was born on 24 June 1934 in the village of Rediul Mare, Soroca County, Kingdom of Romania (currently Republic of Moldova). He was a professor (from 1971) at Moldova State University, Technical University of Moldova, Alexandru Ioan Cuza University in Iași, the Academy of Sciences of the Republic of Moldova, Dimitrie Cantemir Ecology University in Iași, Free International University of Moldova, and the University of Ecology and Social Sciences of Romania. He was an invited professor at several universities in the United States, Russia, England, Poland, Romania, Bulgaria, Ukraine, Norway, Turkey, Greece, etc. He was the author of more than 400 scientific papers, including more than 20 monographs in the field of general ecology (theoretical), hydrobiology, zoology, environmental protection, and scientific journalism. He discovered and formulated the principle (law) of the mutual exclusion of biotic aquatic complexes of different biogeographical origins; he was the author of several terms, notions and ecological sintagmes. He discovered and described new species of superior crustaceans.

He was one of the key founders of modern theoretical ecology, the founder of the National Ecological School, and of the School of Aquatic Ecotoxicology, and of the Scientific School of Political Ecology, the mentor of over 30 doctors in biological sciences, etc.

He was a correspondent member of the Academy of Sciences of Moldova and the holder member of the following Academy of Sciences: Romanian Academy of Sciences Romanian Scientist (cochaiperson and co-founder), International Cosmonautics "E.C. Tiolkovski" (Moscow), Ecology and Life Security (Saint Petersburg), Ecology in Romania, National Ecological Sciences in RM. (Chairperson-Founder), International Informatization (Associate of the United Nations, of the New York Academy of Sciences (United States), Ukrainian Academy of Ecology (Kyiv), Russian Academy of Natural Sciences (Moscow), International of Economic Sciences (Moscow), International Academy of Personnel (EU and UNESCO), International Academy of Nature and Human Society (Moscow), Balkan Sciences, New Culture and Sustainable Development (Sofia, Bulgaria), etc. Member of the Club of Rome (Committee "Future for Europe"); Professor of Honor / Doctor Honoris Causa of several academies and universities and member of several academic societies from abroad.

He was co-founder and the chairman of the "Green Alliance" ecological party from R.M., of the Environment magazines (Romania), Environment (R.M.) and Noosferă (R.M.); chairman-founder of the Association of Scientists of the Republic of Moldova; Scientific Coordinator and Coauthor of National Strategies for Environmental Protection, Biodiversity Conservation, Protection of the Danube Basin Environment (Prut Sector), Sustainable Development, Red Book (2nd Edition), Annual National Report on the Environment of the Republic of Moldova. etc.; Member of the Parliament of R.M. (Chairman of the Committee on Agriculture, Food Industry, Ecology and Rural Development, 1994–2001), Minister of Environment of the Republic of Moldova (1990–1994).

Chairman-Founder of the National Ecological Institute and the chairperson and founder of the National Academy of Ecological Sciences of the Republic of Moldova. He was an honorary director of the Institute of Ecology and Geography of the Academy of Sciences of the Republic of Moldova and founding director Institute for Environmental Research and Sustainable Development at Free International Institute of Moldova.

== Decorations ==
He was decorated with: "The great Golden Medal" and introduced in the "Golden Book" of the Planet "At the Threshold of the Third Millennium" the International Order for Merits, the Golden Medal for Moldova (Cambridge, England); International Order "Green Cross" (UN), Order of R.M. "Glory og Work" and the Order of the Republic of Moldova, the Golden Medal of the Ministry of Education of the GDR. From 2001, he was headed as "20th Century Leader" (UE, Honorary Director for Europe of the International Center of Biographies (Cambridge, England), in 2009 he was awarded by Romanian Academy for the fundamental work – Ecological Treaty (in 5 volumes).
