= Nimish Pilankar =

Indian sound editor (c.1990–2019)

- Born: c. 1990
- Died: 24 November 2019 (aged 29)
- Occupation: Sound editor

Nimish Pilankar (c. 1990 – 24 November 2019) was an Indian sound editor who worked on many films.

== Biography ==
Pilankar first work in Bollywood was Race 3. He also worked in films like Kesari and Housefull 4.

Pilankar died of brain haemorrhage on 24 November 2019 at the age of 29.

== Selected filmography ==
- Race 3 (2018)
- Jalebi (2018)
- Ek Ladki Ko Dekha Toh Aisa Laga (2019)
- Kesari (2019)
- Housefull 4 (2019)
- Bypass Road (2019)
- Marjaavaan (2019)
