= Bai Dezhang =

Chinese film actor and director (1931–2019)

Bai Dezhang (Chinese: 白德彰; 1931 – 23 November 2019) was a Chinese film actor and director with Changchun Film Studio, best known for his performance in the 1963 film Visitors on the Icy Mountain. He received the Honorary Award of the Golden Phoenix Awards in 2009.

== Biography ==
Bai was born in 1931 in Xinmin, Liaoning, Republic of China. After the founding of the People's Republic of China in 1949, he became an actor with Northeast Film Studio (a predecessor of Changchun Film Studio).

Starting with bit parts in films such as The White Haired Girl, he later became a principal actor in a number of films such as Ji Hongchang (吉鸿昌), Eagle in the Storm (暴风中的雄鹰), and Man in the Painting (画中人). His best known role was probably as Commander of the 3rd Platoon in the 1963 film Visitors on the Icy Mountain.

Starting in the 1980s, Bai became a director. Together with his wife Xu Xunxing (徐迅行), also a director at Changchun Film Studio, he co-directed a number of films including A Place Far From the Crowds (远离人群的地方), Modern Gladiator (现代角斗士), Hero of Guandong (关东大侠), and Heroine of Guandong (关东女侠). In 2009, he received the Honorary Award of the Golden Phoenix Awards.

Bai died on 23 November 2019 in Changchun, aged 88.
