= Daniel Lobb =

British designer (died 2019)

Daniel Lobb (died 2019) was a designer of optical instruments and imaging spectrometers.

== Education ==
For his secondary education, Lobb attended Dorking Grammar School.

Lobb later attended Imperial College London and received a Bachelor of Science in Physics. He then received a Diploma of Imperial College in Optics.

== Career ==
Lobb worked at the United States Naval Research Laboratory, the Scientific Instrument Research Association, and Surrey Satellite Technology; designing instruments for the European Space Agency and NASA. During his career, Lobb designed laser projector-based flight simulators, optical instruments for satellites, imaging spectrometers for satellites, imaging spectrometers to measure environmental properties (such as water quality and air pollution), and a complex field splitter for James Webb Space Telescope. In 2012, Lobb received an award from the Royal Aeronautical Society for "specialist contributions in aerospace."

== Selected publications ==
- "New concepts for in-flight characterisation of space-based radiometric instruments." SPIE Volume 3221, Dec 1997.
- "Design of a spectrometer system for Measurements on Earth atmosphere from geostationary orbit." SPIE Volume 5249, Feb 2004.
- "Wide-angle optical systems with moderate spectral resolution, for monitoring the oceans from low Earth orbit." SPIE Volume 5962, September 2005.
- "Experimental measurements for passive athermalization of a satelliteborne MWIR telescope including dn/dT, CTE, and final evaluation." SPIE, Volume 3739, Sept 1999.
- "Imaging Spectrometers for Remote Sensing from Space." Proc. 32nd ESLAB Symposium., Remote Sensing Methodology for Earth Observation and Planetary Exploration, ESTEC, 1998.
- "Theory of concentric designs for grating spectrometers." Applied Optics, Volume 33, Issue 13, May 1994.
- "Imaging spectrometers using concentric optics." SPIE Volume 3118, Oct 1997.
- "Calibration for the Medium Resolution Imaging Spectrometer (MERIS)." SPIE Volume 1493, Aug 1991.
- "Medium Resolution Imaging Spectrometer (MERIS)." SPIE Volume 1490, April 1991.
- "Development of Design Concepts for the Prism (Process Research by an Imaging Space Mission) Instrument." SPIE Volume 2774, Aug 1996.
- "Optical Fabrication and Testing." Proceeding of SPIE/Europto Series. Eds. Roland Geyl, Jonathan Maxwell, September 1999.
- "Integration & Testing of the Compact High-Resolution Imaging Spectrometer (CHRIS)." SPIE Volume 3753, July 1999.
- "PRISM on-board characterisation." SPIE Volume 2957, Jan 1996.
- "Strategies for calibration of high-resolution imaging spectrometer data." SPIE Volume 2957, Jan 1997.
- "Flight Experience of the Compact High Resolution Imaging Spectrometer (CHRIS)." SPIE Volume 5159, Aug 2003.
- "Ratioing methods for in-flight response calibration of space-based spectro-radiometers, operating in the solar spectral region." Proc. ICSO, Toulouse, March 2004.
- "Design of the Compact High-Resolution Imaging Spectrometer (CHRIS), and Future Developments." Proc. ICSO, Toulouse, March 2004.
- "Design and Manufacturing Methods for the Integral Field Unit of the NIRSpec Instrument on JWST." Proc ICSO, ESTEC, 2006.
