= Visitors on the Icy Mountain =

1963 film directed by Zhao Xinshui

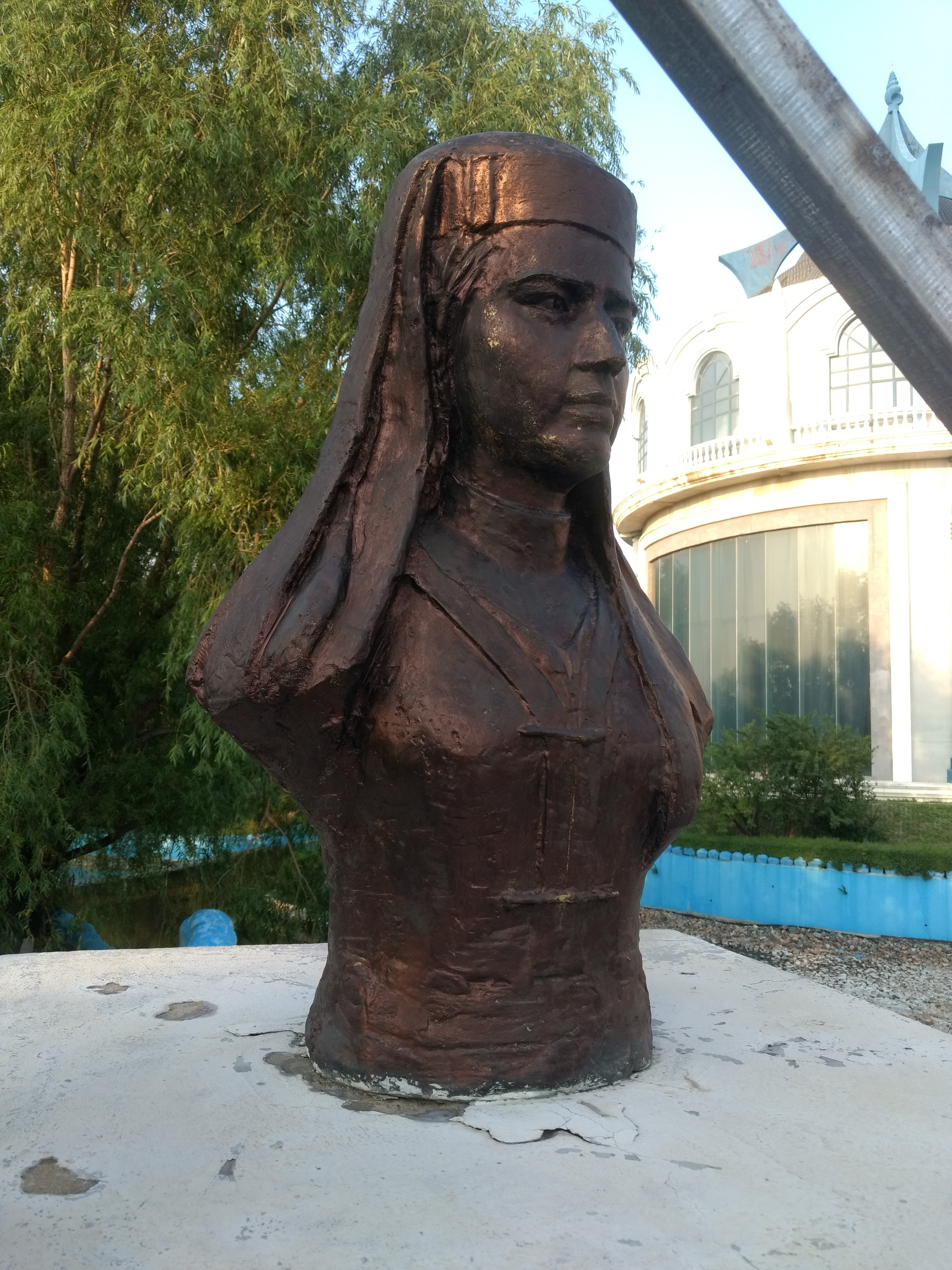
Bingshan Shang de Laike

Visitors on the Icy Mountain (Chinese: 冰山上的来客; pinyin: Bīngshān Shàng de Láikè) is a 1963 Chinese film directed by Zhao Xinshui to a script by Bai Xin. The film is famous for its songs such as "Why Are the Flowers So Red", featuring the rawap and music of the Tajiks of Xinjiang. The cast features Bai Dezhang, En Hesen, and Gu Yuying.
