= Fabrizio Nassi =

Italian volleyball player (1951–2019)

Personal information
- Born: 5 August 1951 Pontedera, Pisa, Italy
- Died: 16 November 2019 (aged 68)
- Height: 1.85 m (6 ft 1 in)
- Weight: 76 kg (168 lb)

Sport
- Sport: Volleyball
- Club: Pallavolo Catania
Medal record
Representing Italy
World Championships
| Silver medal – second place | 1978 Rome | Team |

Fabrizio Nassi (5 August 1951 – 16 November 2019) was an Italian volleyball player. He was part of Italian teams that finished second at the 1978 World Championships, eighth at the 1976 Summer Olympics and ninth at the 1980 Summer Olympics.
