= Jacek Kurzawiński =

Polish volleyball coach (1962–2019)

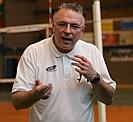

Personal information
- Full name: Jacek Kurzawiński
- Born: 24 February 1962
- Died: 17 November 2019 (aged 57)
- Height: 1.98 m (6 ft 6 in)

Volleyball information
- Position: coach
- Current team: Chełmiec Wałbrzych

Career
Years	Teams
1995-1999; 2005-2006; 2006-2007; 2007-2008; 2008-2009; 2009-2010; 2010-2016; 2016-current	AL Canteleu Maromme; SCA Angouleme; VB Annecy; AL Caudry; Joker Piła; Sudety Kamienna Góra; Harnes VB; Chełmiec Wałbrzych

National team
1979-1982 Poland

Jacek Kurzawiński (24 February 1962 – 17 November 2019) was a Polish professional volleyball head coach qualified by FIVB and FFVB. From 2016, he was the head coach of Chełmiec Wałbrzych, a women's volleyball team in Polish Division III.

Kurzawiński was born in Wałbrzych. He was a member of the Polish junior team which won the European Junior Championship named "Friendship Tournament" in 1978. He made his debut in the senior squad during 1979 summer season and he was member of Polish National Team until 1982.

== Clubs as player ==
- Chełmiec Wałbrzych
- Resovia Rzeszów
- Gwardia Wrocław
- PTT Ankara
- Chełmiec Wałbrzych
- HAC Le Havre
- ALCM Maromme - Canteleu

== Career highlights ==
- 1983 Cup of Poland with Resovia Rzeszów
- 1983 4th Polish Championship with Resovia Rzeszów
- 1984 4th Polish Championship with Resovia Rzeszów
- 1986 4th Polish Championship with Gwardia Wrocław
- 1993 Cup of Poland with Chełmiec Wałbrzych
- 1994 4th Polish Championship with Chełmiec Wałbrzych
- 1994 Quarter Final in CEV Cup with Chełmiec Wałbrzych

== Individual awards ==
- 1977 The best Polish setter in Junior Championship of Poland

== Coaching history ==
Kurzawinski was the top assistant coach and recruiter under head coach for Chełmiec Wałbrzych from 1993-1994. After leaving Walbrzych, Kurzawinski was the player-coach of the Le Havre in France for season. In his first season there, the Hotvolleys won the Coupe of Normandie. For the next year Jacek Kurzawinski found employment in Maromme for the 4 seasons like a head coach in second league. Six years later he returned to France to Angoulême (second league). Next season he was player-coach in Annecy (5th place in second league) and changed employment to AL Caudry in season 2007/2008. In season 2008/2009 he was a head coach of Joker Pila team in PRO B and next season he tried for promotion to PRO B with other Silesian team Sudety Kamienna Góra. Before 2010/2011 season he found employment in Harnes (France) in PRO B of women league (7th place). In season 2011/2012 Jacek Kurzawinski extended his contract with Harnesien Volleyball. In 2016, he returned to his hometown to reactivate Chełmiec Wałbrzych women's team in Division III Polish league.

== Coaching clubs ==
- Chełmiec Wałbrzych
- HAC Le Havre
- ALCM Maromme-Canteleu
- SCA Angoulême
- VB Annecy
- AL Caudry
- Joker Piła women
- Sudety Kamienna Góra
- Harnes VB women
- Chełmiec Wałbrzych women
