= Alfred Streun =

Swiss ice hockey player (1925–2019)

- Born: June 17, 1925; Bern, Switzerland
- Died: November 26, 2019 (aged 94)
- Position: Right Wing
- National team: Switzerland
- Playing career: 1949–1961

Alfred Streun (June 17, 1925 – November 26, 2019) was a Swiss ice hockey player who competed for the Swiss national team at the 1952 Winter Olympics.
