= Zulkarnain Karim =

Indonesian politician (died 2019)

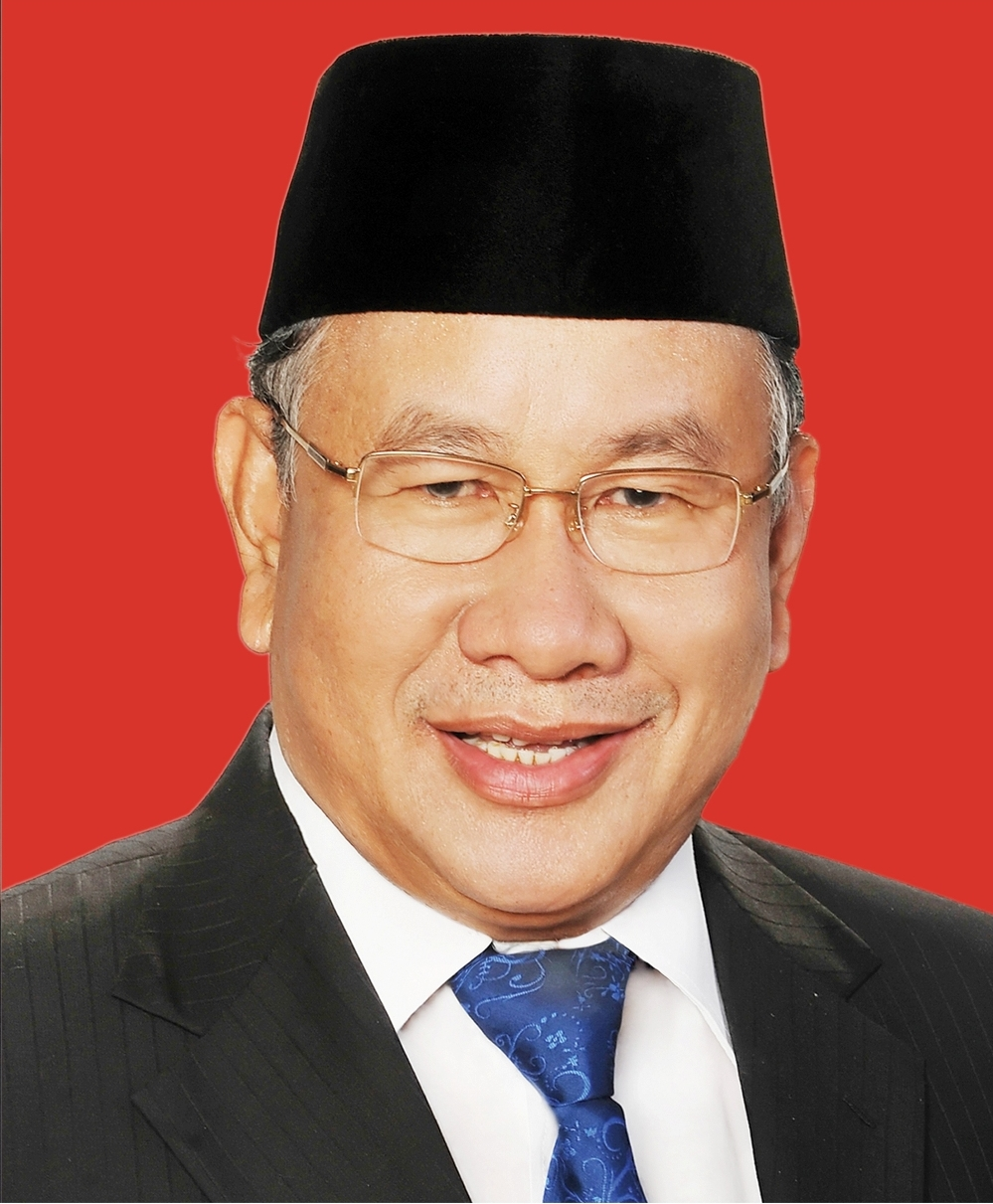
Zulkarnain Karim (2014).

Zulkarnain Karim (died 13 November 2019) was an Indonesian politician who served as a member of the Regional Representative Council.
