= Thakur Prithvi Singh Deora =

Indian politician (c.1934–2019)

Rajasthan Legislative Assembly
- In office 1967–1972
- Preceded by: Mohan Raj Jain
- Succeeded by: Mohan Raj Jain
- Constituency: Bali

Personal details
- Born: c. 1934
- Died: 26 November 2019 (aged 85)
- Party: Swatantra Party

Thakur Prithvi Singh Deora (c. 1934 – 26 November 2019) was an Indian politician from Rajasthan belonging to Swatantra Party. He was a member of the Rajasthan Legislative Assembly.

== Biography ==
Deora was elected as a member of the Rajasthan Legislative Assembly from Bali in 1967.

Deora died on 26 November 2019 at the age of 85.
