= Kenneth H. Gould =

American politician

Member of the New Hampshire House of Representatives
- In office 1975–1976

Member of the New Hampshire House of Representatives from the Rockingham 4th district
- In office 1976–1982

Member of the New Hampshire House of Representatives from the Rockingham 77th district
- In office 2002–2004

Member of the New Hampshire House of Representatives from the Rockingham 5th district
- In office 2004–2011

Personal details
- Born: October 18, 1938
- Died: November 23, 2019 (aged 81)
- Party: Republican
- Spouse: Selma
- Education: Babson College

Kenneth Hamilton Gould (October 18, 1938 – November 23, 2019) was an American politician. He served as a Republican member for the Rockingham 4th, 5th and 77th district of the New Hampshire House of Representatives.

== Life and career ==
Gould attended Babson College and served in the United States Army Reserve.

Gould served in the New Hampshire House of Representatives from 1975 to 1982 and again from 2002 to 2011.

Gould died November 23, 2019, at the age of 81.
