= Andrew Jin Daoyuan =

Chinese bishop (1929–2019)

Andrew Jin Daoyuan (Chinese: 靳道远; 13 June 1929 – 20 November 2019) was a bishop of the Catholic Patriotic Association.

He was born in China and was ordained to the priesthood in 1956. He served as bishop of the Roman Catholic Diocese of Lu'an, China, without papal approval from 2000 until his death in 2019. He served as a bishop with Chinese Patriotic Catholic Association.
