= Ram Ray =

Indian advertising professional (1943–2019)

- Born: 27 January 1943
- Died: 12 November 2019 (aged 76); Kolkata, West Bengal, India
- Education: Presidency College
- Spouse: Hasi Ray
- Children: Rashi Ray

Ram Ray (27 January 1943 – 12 November 2019) was an Indian advertising professional. He worked in advertisement arena over fifty years.

== Biography ==
Ray was a student of Presidency College. He worked in J. Walter Thompson's India and the United States branch. He was the senior vice president of the United States branch and head of the San Francisco branch of J. Walter Thompson. He was the only non-American on the board of J. Walter Thompson. He was also the head of Calcutta, Madras and Bangalore office of J. Walter Thompson. He established Response Group in 1984. He also was chief executive officer of Bates CHI & Partners from 1992 to 1998. He established Wysiwyg Communications too. Advertising Club Calcutta inducted Ray on its Hall of Fame in 2013.

Ray was married to Hashi. They had one daughter, Rashi Ray.

Ray died on 12 November 2019.
