= Chris Ransick =

American writer and poet (1962–2019)

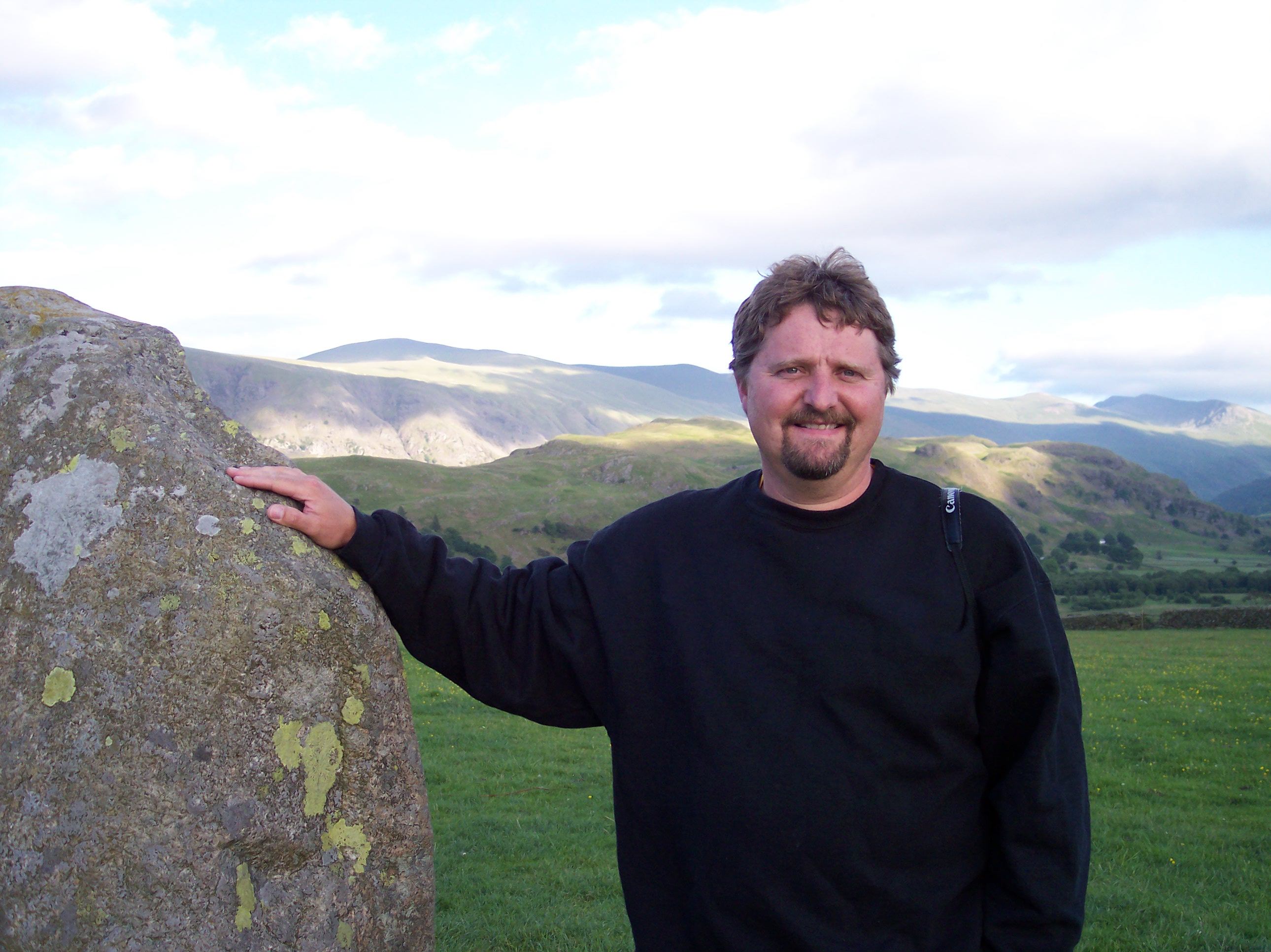
Chris Ransick in 2004

Chris Ransick (1962 – 2019) was a writer of literary fiction and poetry from Colorado. Ransick was appointed by Mayor John Hickenlooper as the poet laureate for the City of Denver, a post Ransick held from 2006 to 2010. He died of pancreatic cancer on November 4, 2019.

== Life ==
Chris Ransick was born in Syracuse, NY and raised in nearby Auburn, in the Finger Lakes region. He earned a B.A from San Francisco State University (1983), an M.A. in journalism from the University of Montana (1988) and an M.A. in English/Creative Writing from the University of California, Davis (1990). During the years he was earning his degrees he worked as a newspaper reporter and editor, and also served as an editorial assistant to the editors of The Last Best Place: A Montana Anthology.

Ransick married Shannon Skaife in 1983 and is the father of two children. He settled with his family in Englewood, Colorado in 1990, where he worked as a college professor for 24 years teaching courses in English, creative writing, screenwriting, film studies, humanities, and media studies. He was a faculty member at Denver's well regarded literary center, Lighthouse Writers Workshop, since 2005. He was awarded the organization's Beacon Award for Teaching Excellence in 2013.

Ransick served as a member of PEN USA's Freedom to Write Committee, as well as serving on his local public library board for 8 years. Upon appointment as Denver's poet laureate, he helped establish the city's program supporting literary arts by organizing readings and engaging with a diverse range of literary groups in the city. He was reappointed to a second term as poet laureate and completed his service in 2010.

== Bibliography ==
Never Summer: Poems from Thin Air, Colorado Book Award for poetry, 2003

A Return to Emptiness, Colorado Book Award finalist for fiction, 2005

Lost Songs & Last Chances

Asleep Beneath the Hill of Dreams

Language for the Living and the Dead

mummer prisoner scavenger thief

Temporary House, 2022 Middle Creek Publishing (Posthumously published new poems)

Joe the Ghost, 2022 Middle Creek Publishing (Posthumously published new poems)
