= Robert J. LaFlam =

American politician

Member of the New Hampshire House of Representatives from the Belknap 2nd district
- In office 1992–2000

Member of the New Hampshire House of Representatives from the Belknap 29th district
- In office 2002–2004

Personal details
- Born: July 24, 1931 Laconia, New Hampshire, U.S.
- Died: November 7, 2019 (aged 88)
- Party: Republican

Robert J. LaFlam (July 24, 1931 – November 7, 2019) was an American politician. He served as a Republican member for the Belknap 2nd and 29th district of the New Hampshire House of Representatives.

== Life and career ==
LaFlam was born in Laconia, New Hampshire. He was a colonel in the United States Army.

LaFlam served in the New Hampshire House of Representatives from 1992 to 2000 and again from 2002 to 2004.

LaFlam died on November 7, 2019, at the age of 88.
