= Lorene Byron Brown =

American librarian and dean (1933–2019)

- Born: November 9, 1933; Plant City, Florida
- Died: November 6, 2019 (aged 85); Atlanta, Georgia
- Occupations: Librarian and Dean
- Spouse: Dr. Paul Lopez Brown

Lorene Byron Brown (November 9, 1933 – November 6, 2019) was an African American librarian and Dean of the Atlanta University School of Library and Information Science from 1982 to 1989.

== Career ==
Brown attended Fort Valley State College in Fort Valley, Georgia, for her undergraduate degree. She joined Alpha Kappa Alpha sorority in 1952, and was the chapter Basileus. She worked in the school library, which influenced her later decision to go into librarianship. She received her BS in Chemistry in 1955, and her Masters of Library Science from Atlanta University in 1956. She studied under Dr. Virginia Lacy Jones.

Brown worked in several libraries as she received her degrees including North Carolina Central University, Gibbs Junior College, Fort Valley State College, and Norfolk State University.

In 1974 she received a PhD from the University of Wisconsin-Madison and joined the faculty as an assistant professor at the Atlanta University. In 1982, she became Dean of the School of Library and Information Science (SLIS). Brown made several important accomplishments during her time as Dean, including enhancing the computer laboratory equipment for the SLIS program and receiving a $250,000 grant from the Fund for the Improvement of Post Secondary Education to improve computer-based reference services for library instruction in 17 HBCUs. Enrollment and resources increased under her leadership. She remained Dean until 1989.

In 1995, she published Subject Headings for African American Materials with Libraries Unlimited.

Brown remained a professor until she retired in 2003, but continued to advise and mentor students and colleagues. After leaving Atlanta University, she became a sought-after consultant for Cooperative College Library Center, Lawrence Livermore National Laboratory, and the United Board for College Development.

== Personal life ==
Lorene Byron was born on November 9, 1933, in Plant City, Florida. She was the daughter of Benjamin and Sallie (Barton) Byron. She had eight siblings, including a twin sister named Irene. The family came to Plant City from Vienna, Georgia, and later the family moved to Tampa, Florida. The Byrons were devout Christians and Lorene played piano and sang in the junior choir.

In 1950, Brown was valedictorian when she graduated from Middleton High School.

Lorene Byron married Dr. Paul L. Brown on August 1, 1974. Brown had three daughters from a previous marriage who became her stepdaughters: Pauletta Bracy, Gloria Nichols and Nanola Henry. They were married for 34 years until his death in 2009.

Brown died in Atlanta, Georgia, on November 6, 2019.

== Published works ==
- Brown, L. B. (1995). Subject headings for African-American materials. Englewood, Colo: Libraries Unlimited.
- Lorene B. Brown, "Recruiting Science Librarians," in Librarians for the New Millennium, William Moen and Kathleen Heim, eds. (Chicago: American Library Association, 1988), 65–71.

== Recognition ==
Brown received the following awards:

- Rachel Schenk Award Library Sch. U. Wis., Madison, 1971;
- Southern Fellowship Foundation fellow Atlanta, 1972-74;
- Library and Information Studies Centennial Celebration Alumnus of Year award in Library Education, University of Wisconsin Library and Information Studies, Madison, 2006.

Brown was a member of many professional organizations, including:

- American Library Association
- Black Caucus of the American Library Association
- American Society for Information Science
- Association for Library and Information Science Education
- Southeastern/Atlantic Regional Advisory Council of National Network of Libraries of Medicine
- Georgia Library Association
- Metro-Atlanta Library Association
- Beta Phi Mu International Library Honor Society.
