= Ratna Ram Chaudhary =

Indian politician (c.1929–2019)

Rajasthan Legislative Assembly
- In office 1977–1985
- Preceded by: Bhagraj Choudhary
- Succeeded by: Arjun Singh Deora
- Constituency: Raniwara
- In office 1990–1993
- Preceded by: Arjun Singh Deora
- Succeeded by: Arjun Singh Deora
- Constituency: Raniwara
- In office 1998–2003
- Preceded by: Arjun Singh Deora
- Succeeded by: Arjun Singh Deora
- Constituency: Raniwara

Personal details
- Born: c. 1929
- Died: 28 November 2019 (aged 90)
- Party: Indian National Congress

Ratna Ram Chaudhary (c. 1929 – 28 November 2019) was an Indian politician from Rajasthan belonging to Indian National Congress. He was a member of the Rajasthan Legislative Assembly. Chaudhary was elected sarpanch for the first time in 1959 in the Panchayat Raj formed after India's independence. After being sarpanch for 22 consecutive years, for the first time in 1977, he was elected MLA from the Congress party. He was again elected MLA in 1980, 1990 and 1998.

== Biography ==
Chaudhary was elected as a member of the Rajasthan Legislative Assembly from Raniwara in 1977. He was also elected from Raniwara in 1980. He was also elected from this constituency in 1990 and 1998.

Chaudhary died on 28 November 2019 at the age of 90.
