= Osvaldo Romberg =

Argentinean artist (1938–2019)

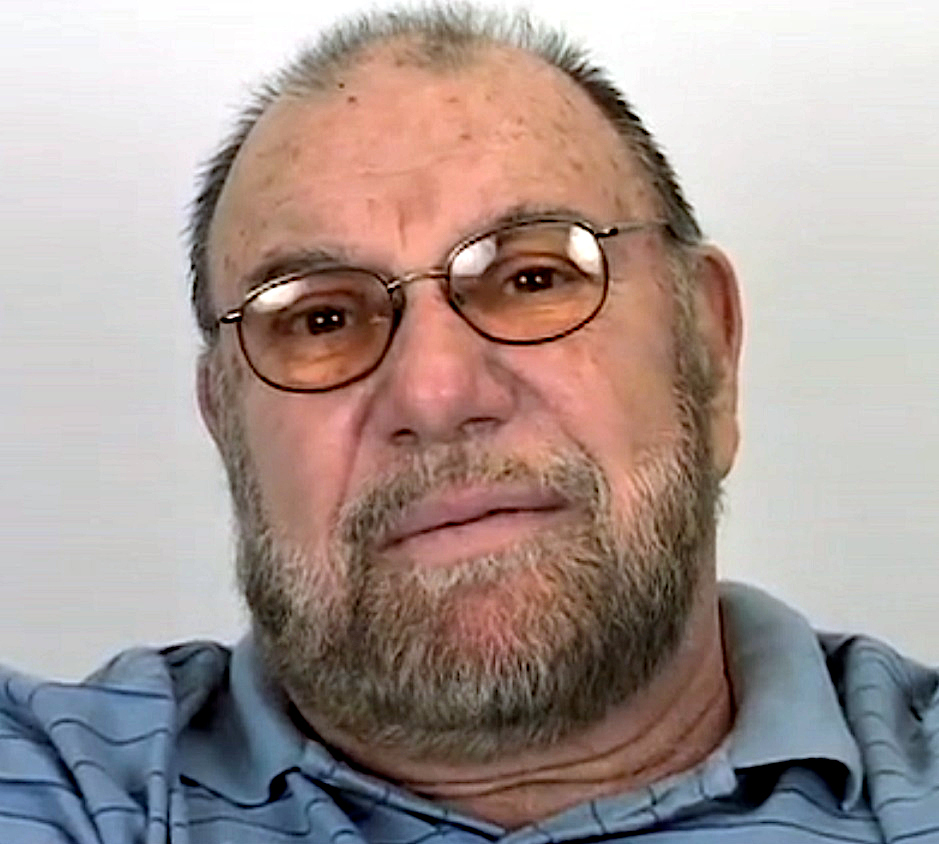
Osvaldo Romberg

Osvaldo Romberg (Hebrew: אוסוולדו רומברג; 28 May 1938 – 26 November 2019) was an Argentine artist, curator, and professor. He lived and worked in Israel, Philadelphia, New York, and Isla Grande, Brazil.

== Life and career ==
Romberg was born in Buenos Aires in 1938. His parents were Jewish immigrants who emigrated to Argentina. He attended high school at the Colegio Nacional de Buenos Aires. After graduating in 1955, he studied architecture at the University of Buenos Aires between 1956 and 1962.

He taught Painting and Color Theory at different universities in Argentina and Latin America until he was forced to flee the Argentine Dirty War, in 1973. He then settled in Israel, where he taught at the Bezalel Academy of Arts and Design for 20 years. In 1993, he began teaching at the Pennsylvania Academy of the Fine Arts in Philadelphia.

His paintings, books, installations, films, and architectural watercolors have been exhibited internationally. Among others, he exhibited at the Negev Museum of Art, Beersheba (2018); the Museum of Modern Art, Buenos Aires (2012); and the Philadelphia Museum of Art (2011). His works are collected at the Museo de Arte Moderno (Buenos Aires), the Museo de Bellas Artes (Buenos Aires), The Ludwig Museum (Cologne), and the Museum of Modern Art, New York.

He was the Senior Curator at Slought Foundation.

== Selected Series of Work ==
=== Color Classifications ===
In 1973, Romberg began a didactic investigation of color classification by annotating marks of color, arranged them in grids on paper or canvas. He later extended this practice to the deconstruction of color in the art historical canon.

=== Paradigma ===
Beginning in 1980, Romberg drew from the writing of analytic philosopher Thomas Kuhn to initiate this series by compressing multiple paradigms of Western painting – often abstraction and representation - onto a single canvas.

=== Translocations, Building Footprints, and On Scale ===
Starting in 1986, Romberg began reconstructing at full scale the floor plans of historical, and often religious, architectural structures. Made from bricks that are in some cases fashioned from books or newspapers, these “footprints” are built either inside the exhibition space or partially outside, yet intersecting with the space.

=== Theater of Transparency ===
This is a series of filmic work started in 1997, drawing from the history of sex, modernity, and art history. The protagonists are a life-size troupe of transparent marionettes, whose bodies are projection surfaces for the changing historical and metaphorical images that compose their constantly fluctuating identities.
