= Ou Tangliang =

Chinese journalist, politician, and diplomat (1914–2019)

Ou Tangling

Ou Tangliang (Chinese: 区棠亮; January 1914 – 30 November 2019) was a Chinese journalist, politician and diplomat. She served as Vice Minister of the International Liaison Department of the Chinese Communist Party, and was a delegate to seven consecutive National People's Congresses, from the 1st to the 7th.

== Biography ==
Ou Tangliang was born in January 1914 in Beijing, Republic of China. She also used the name Tang Liang (唐亮). She graduated from the Department of Journalism of Yenching University in 1935.

During the Second Sino-Japanese War, she joined the Chinese Communist Party (CCP) in May 1938, and served as the secretary of the CCP leader Lin Boqu. After the surrender of Japan, she worked in Northeast China in the former Liaobei province and then as editor-in-chief of the Harbin Daily newspaper.

In 1948, she went to Paris to serve as the Chinese representative at the World Federation of Democratic Youth. After the founding of the People's Republic of China in 1949, she served as head of the International Liaison Department of the Communist Youth League of China (CYL) and Secretary of the Central Committee of the CYL. From 1957, she served in various positions in the International Liaison Department of the Chinese Communist Party (ILD). She was appointed Vice Minister of the ILD from February 1978 to April 1982, and then as an advisor to the ILD. She retired in July 1975.

Ou served consecutive terms as a delegate to the first seven National People's Congresses (NPC). She was also a Standing Committee Member of the 3rd to the 7th NPC, and a member of the 6th and 7th National People's Congress Foreign Affairs Committee.

Ou died in Beijing on 30 November 2019, aged 105.
