= W. George Allen =

African-American civil rights activist and lawyer (1936–2019)

W. George Allen (March 3, 1936 – November 8, 2019) was an American civil rights activist and lawyer who was the first African-American to graduate from the University of Florida School of Law.

== Biography ==
As a child in Sanford, Florida, Allen picked vegetables. He graduated from Crooms High School. He graduated from Florida A & M University in 1958 before working for U.S. Army Intelligence, where he was the only black person. He was accepted to Harvard Law School but chose instead to become the first African-American at the University of Florida College of Law. Campus housing at Florida was not available for black people, so Allen and his wife managed to purchase a home. During his time at UF, Allen was active in the civil rights movement and attended sit-ins. He graduated in 1962. Upon graduation, Allen filed a suit that led to the integration of Broward County, Florida's public accommodations and Broward County Public Schools. After passing the bar in 1963, the family moved to Fort Lauderdale, Florida.

Allen died on November 8, 2019, at the age of 83.
