= Fernand Carton =

French linguist (1921–2019)

- Born: 4 September 1921; Roubaix, France
- Died: 16 November 2019 (aged 98); Malzéville, France

Academic work
- Discipline: Linguist
- Sub-discipline: Picard language
- Institutions: Nancy 2 University; University of Lorraine

Fernand Carton (4 September 1921 – 16 November 2019) was a French linguist who specialized in Picardic dialects.

== Biography ==
After passing the Agrégation de Lettres classiques exams in 1958, Carton published numerous articles in the field of phonetics. He became a fellow of the Royal Society of Canada and President of the Language Sciences section of the national committee of the French National Centre for Scientific Research. He also served as President of Nancy 2 University and University of Lorraine. He published a linguistic atlas of the Picard language, and adapted the Feller-Carton dialect transcription system.
