= Bjarke Gundlev =

Danish footballer (1931–2019)

Personal information
- Date of birth: 9 January 1931
- Date of death: 28 November 2019 (aged 88)

International career
Years	Team	Apps	(Gls)
1957	Denmark	1	(0)

Bjarke Gundlev (9 January 1931 – 28 November 2019) was a Danish footballer. He played in one match for the Denmark national football team in 1957.
