= Bill Trowbridge =

British physicist (1930–2019)

Charles William Trowbridge (10 July 1930 – 13 November 2019) was a British physicist and engineer working in the field of computational electromagnetics.

== Career ==
Trowbridge was born on 10 July 1930 in Totton. From 1946 to 1948 he received naval training on HMS Conway. He subsequently worked eight years in the merchant navy. From 1957 to 1961 he worked at the Atomic Energy Research Establishment. During this period he obtained a degree in physics from Regent Street Polytechnic.

Trowbridge started working at the Rutherford Laboratory in 1961. In 1971 he became head of its Computing Applications Group. When the Compumag conferences started in 1976 he was the first chairperson. In 1984 he was co-founder of Vector Fields Ltd, a computer aided engineering consultancy. Trowbridge served as head of the company until it was bought by Chelton in 2005. In 1987 he retired from the Rutherford Laboratory. Apart from his other positions he was a visiting professor at King's College London. Trowbridge is considered to be one of the founders of the field of computational electromagnetics.

Trowbridge was elected a foreign member of the Royal Netherlands Academy of Arts and Sciences in 1992. In 1993 he was made Officer in the Order of the British Empire.

He died on 13 November 2019, aged 89.
