= Rhea G. Sikes =

American television producer and educator (1922–2019)

Rhea Gaynelle Sikes (June 14, 1922 – November 5, 2019) was an American television producer and educator. She worked for networks including PBS and local television stations WQED and WNET.

== Early life and education ==
Rhea Sikes was born and raised in Greensboro, North Carolina. She attended Greensboro High School and went to University of North Carolina Women’s College. During her undergraduate studies, Sikes’ artwork was displayed several times, including works with media lithographs and oils. There she earned her bachelor’s degree in Art and minored in Drama. She earned her Master’s of Arts in Television in 1954 from Syracuse University. With this educational experience, she had a strong background in script-writing, producing, and directing.

== Career ==
Sikes started her television career working for WFMY-TV in Greensboro, NC. She also traveled the United States to present educational programs for the Good Teeth Council.

In July 1955, Sikes began her career at WQED in Pittsburgh, Pennsylvania, as producer of Television Teaching Demonstration. She then transitioned to the position of director of educational services. Sikes produced programming for the first telecast classrooms to elementary schools for the Metropolitan School Service in 1955. She helped sustain WQED's instructional television service for almost twenty years, helping to plan and encourage the use of instructional television in Pennsylvania and in the wider Eastern Educational Network.

In 1970, Sikes produced the television series “The Turned on Crisis” at WQED about the issues of drug abuse in the Pittsburgh area; the series won the 1970 Community Service Award competition. In 1971, Sikes was the director of educational activities at WQED. During her time working at WQED, Sikes served many positions, including assistant program manager, producer, director of school services, and executive producer for educational programming.

In 1973, began working at the Public Broadcasting Service (PBS) and became the first coordinator of educational services at WNET. In this position, Sikes reviewed, evaluated, and coordinated informational and educational programming presented to general and classroom audiences. In 1978, Sikes left her job at PBS to become an independent consultant. She consulted for other television stations, school systems, and the Corporation for Public Broadcasting.

Sikes was honored with the George Peabody Award for television education (1971), the Corporation for Public Broadcasting Community Service Award (1971), and a citation for contributions to the advancement of education from the Pennsylvania Department of Education (1974). Sikes was a member of the organization American Women in Radio and Television.

Sikes died on November 5, 2019.

== List of works ==
- Robertson, James; Sikes, Rhea G. (1978). KRMA: its present status, its future potential : a study for the Denver Public Schools. Denver, CO: Robertson Associates, Inc. OCLC 842289606.
