= Doris Howell =

American physician

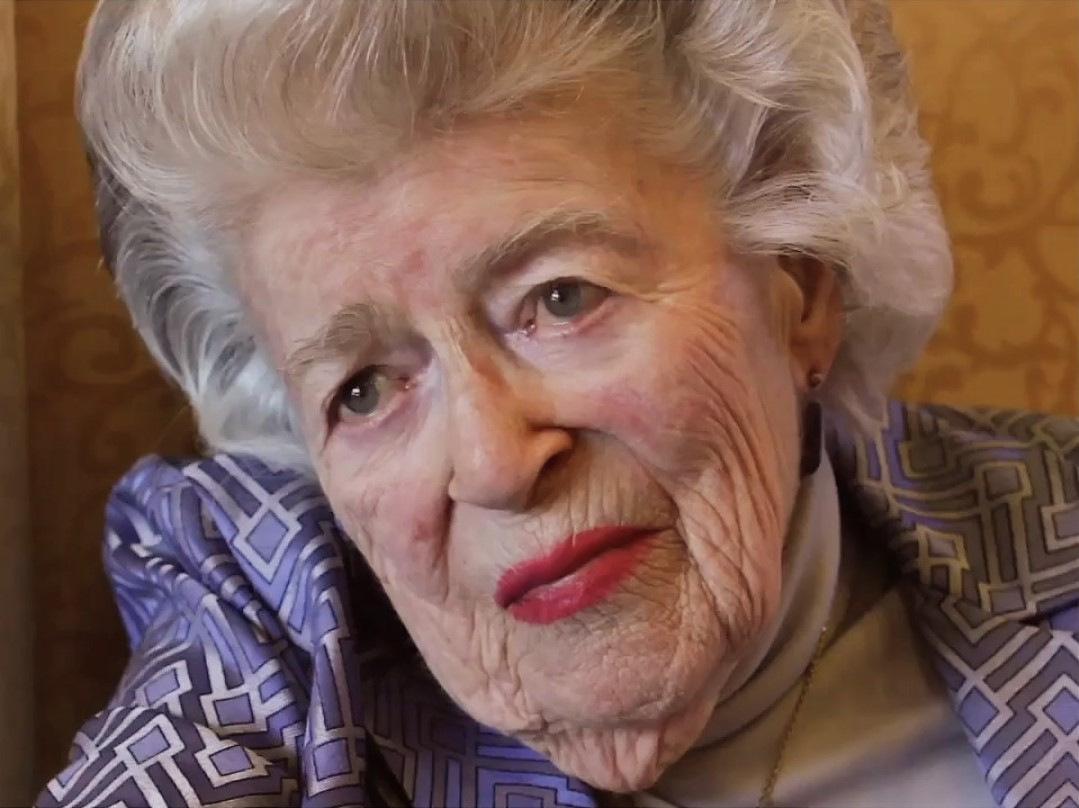
- Howell in 2013
- Born: 1923; Brooklyn, NY
- Died: November 23, 2019 (aged 95–96)
- Education: Medical College of Pennsylvania; Duke University School of Medicine; Harvard Medical School
- Scientific career
- Workplaces: Park University; McGill University

Doris Howell was an American physician who specialized in pediatric oncology. She became known as the "mother of hospice," for her pioneering work in palliative care.

== Early life and education ==
Howell was born in Brooklyn, New York. She was born prematurely, and was placed in a "shoebox, in my Institutions Medical College of Pennsylvania Duke University School of Medicine Harvard Medical School grandmother's home on the top shelf of the old kitchen stove,". Her father died when she was two years old. Her step father was from Hungary. She grew up in Baldwin, New York. As a young child, she was treated for mastoiditis, and decided that she wanted to become a nurse. She was an undergraduate at Park University. She moved to McGill University for her graduate studies, where she studied medicine. She originally thought that she would train in psychiatry, but changed her mind after a bad experience on a ward. She moved to Children's Memorial Hospital to complete an internship in pediatric medicine. In 1951, she joined Duke University School of Medicine as an assistant resident in pediatrics. Howell was a research fellow in oncology at Harvard Medical School, where she was based in the laboratory of Louis Diamond. At the time, the pathologist was Sidney Farber, who was leading research into the leukemia drugs methotrexate and amethopterin.

== Research and career ==
In 1955, Howell joined the faculty at the Duke University School of Medicine. She worked with pediatric cancer patients, and was hired as a pediatric oncologist. She developed a division in pediatric haematology-oncology. At Duke, Howell was celebrated for her teaching, receiving the Distinguished Award for Teaching twice. Her first research fellow, Philip Lanzkowsky, went on to become Chair of Pediatric Medicine at Stony Brook University Hospital.

After a phone call from Marian Fay, then President of the Woman's Medical College of Pennsylvania, Howell was offered a position as Head of Pediatrics. She moved to the Medical College of Pennsylvania (now Drexel University College of Medicine) in 1970. That year she was named the Distinguished Alumni of the year, the first woman to be so named.

Howell eventually moved to the Association of American Medical Colleges, where she spent a year before getting a call from the chair in Pediatrics at University of California, San Diego. He encouraged her to move to San Diego and take up the role of Associate Head of department. She ran the Department of Community and Family Medicine. The department was going through a high rate of staff turnover, and whilst Howell had originally intended to stay for only a year, she ended up staying for five.

Howell was passionate about identifying new ways to support people who were dying and their families. She was critical in the development of The San Diego Hospice and Palliative Care Center, which she founded in 1976. She became known as the "Mother of Hospice". She created training programs for medical students, nurses, physicians and fellows. She was named Director Emerita in 1989. In 1995, the Soroptimist International of La Jolla established the Doris A. Howell Foundation for Women's Health Research. The UC San Diego Health Palliative Care Teams are named in her honor.

== Awards and honors ==
- 1970 Duke University Distinguished Alumni of the Year
- 2004 San Diego Women's Hall of Fame

== Selected publications ==
- D M ALLEN; L K DIAMOND; D A HOWELL (1 June 1960). "Anaphylactoid purpura in children (Schonlein-Henoch syndrome): review with a follow-up of the renal complications". A.M.A. journal of diseases of children. 99: 833–854. doi:10.1001/archpedi.1960.02070030835021. ISSN 0096-6916. PMID 13792721. Wikidata Q35329661.
- J H FERGUSON; C L JOHNSTON; D A HOWELL (1 July 1957). "Anti-AcG: specific circulating inhibitor of the labile clotting factor". Proceedings of the Society for Experimental Biology and Medicine. 95 (3): 567–570. doi:10.3181/00379727-95-23293. ISSN 0037-9727. PMID 13453509. Wikidata Q74582265.
- M. S. SPACH; D. A. HOWELL; J. S. HARRIS (1 February 1963). "Myocardial infarction and multiple thromboses in a child with primary thrombocytosis". Pediatrics. 31: 268–276. ISSN 0031-4005. PMID 13978475. Wikidata Q79620941.

== Death ==
Howell died on November 23, 2019.
