= Tauba Biterman =

Polish Holocaust survivor

Tauba Biterman (née Fuks; September 10, 1917 or 1918, differing sources – November 11, 2019) was a Holocaust survivor from Zamość, Poland. She dedicated her life to teaching and sharing memories of the Holocaust. Her speeches painted a realistic portrait of what a Jewish girl from Poland went through between 1939 and 1945.

Biterman's story differs from the stories of most other Jewish Holocaust survivors because she was forced to abandon her identity during the war years, live an underground existence, and never was in a Concentration Camp. She was in the Dubno ghetto in Volhynia, but managed to escape with the help of a non-Jewish man she knew. During the period of 1939–1945, she was separated from her family and entirely removed from Jewish life.

== Biography ==
=== 1917–1939 ===
Biterman was born and raised in Zamość, Poland, the oldest daughter of a cap maker. When she was 18, she, her parents and her five younger siblings fled their home for what is now Ukraine, thinking life there would be better for Jews.

=== 1939–1945 ===
Believing they would be able to continue to see her, Biterman's family left her in what is now Ukraine because she had a job. Meanwhile, they went to a different part of the former Soviet Union. "But it didn’t work out ... because [subsequently] Germany started the war and then I was on my own. I was very naïve, but God gave me so much strength and so much courage."

Biterman was first hidden, then passed as a German from the Black Forest. She survived by staying on the move, working when she could get work, and staying alert to the suspicions and accusations of Poles and Ukrainians who "always looked for Jews and hunted us out." Her harrowing experiences included having guns held to her head to coerce her into confessing that she was a Jew. "I was very strong and life was precious. I didn't want to die from a bullet."

=== 1948–2019 ===
In 1948, Biterman and her husband Judah (later known as Edward Biterman; also a Holocaust survivor) emigrated to Milwaukee, where they came to learn the American way of life, raise their two children, and earn a living.

=== Speaking and volunteering ===
Biterman spoke about her experience to a variety of groups including numerous schools, universities, synagogues, and civic groups in Milwaukee. At the time of her death in 2019, she was one of the few remaining Holocaust survivors in the entire state of Wisconsin. She never refused a request to talk about her personal Holocaust experience because "it’s important for young people to know about the Holocaust so it shouldn’t happen again." She believed the Holocaust would never have happened if the Jewish people had their own space. "A people without a home is not respected and [other nations] do with you what they want." She was a strong and vocal advocate for Holocaust education and a steadfast supporter of Israel.
