= Tun Lwin =

Burmese meteorologist (1948–2019)

Tun Lwin Dr
- ထွန်းလွင်

Deputy-director of Ministry of Meteorology and Hydrology, Myanmar
- In office 1980–2003

Director-General of Department of Meteorology and Hydrology
- In office 2004–2009

Personal details
- Born: 17 January 1948 Kula village, Ngazun, Myanmar
- Died: 4 November 2019 (aged 71) Yangon, Myanmar
- Spouse: Mu Mu Than
- Children: 3
- Parent(s): Thein Maung (father); Aye Gyi (mother)
- Education: Yangon University; Florida State University; Lafom Memorial High School Mandalay
- Website: https://www.facebook.com/tunlwin48

Tun Lwin (Burmese: ထွန်းလွင်, also Htun Lwin; 17 January 1948 – 4 November 2019) was a Burmese meteorologist who warned of the approach of the deadly Cyclone Nargis in 2008, but was largely ignored by local people and authorities in the Irrawaddy Delta. He served as Director-General of Department of Meteorology and Hydrology.

Tun was a familiar sight on television screens long before he became Myanmar's favorite and most followed weatherman. His nightly appearances as a weather forecasting official from the government's Meteorology and Hydrology Department usually right before the evening movie was due to start—used to annoy many viewers across Myanmar.

== Early life and education ==
Tun Lwin was born on 17 January 1948 in Kula Village, Ngazun, British Burma, to parents Theing Maung and Aye Gyi. He is the eldest of two siblings, having a younger brother. He grew up in Mandalay and attended Lafom Memorial High School in Mandalay. He received a master's degree in meteorology from Florida State University in the US, and a PhD from Yangon University in July 2018.

== Career ==
Tun has worked in Burma's Department of Meteorology and Hydrology since 1965 when he was 17 years old in 1965. He then served as Deputy-Director in the Ministry of Meteorology and Hydrology until 2003 when he was promoted to Director General of Department of Meteorology and Hydrology. One of the most notable occurrences during his appointment was Cyclone Nargis, the worst natural disaster to hit Myanmar in recorded history. Despite the high number of casualties and devastation, he was commended after initial criticism for his prediction and speedy warning of the Cyclone especially considering the limited resources and political bureaucracy of Burma at the time. After 44 years in total at the DMH, he retired in 2009. After his retirement, he actively engaged in raising awareness about the need to adequately prepare for natural disasters.

He was a well-known, active "netizen" in Myanmar who operated a free, non-profit service as Myanmar Climate Change Watch (MCCW). In addition to giving talks and appearing on various media such as newspapers, journals, magazines, television and radio channels to educate the public on weather and climate, he also provided free weather updates through Facebook where he also sometimes posted updates and anecdotes about his own personal life and opinions.

He has written numerous successful books on weather in Myanmar, worked with local radio stations on weather-related segments and regularly wrote articles on various topics not limited to just weather updates in Burmese magazines and newspaper journals. His book, The Girl Called La Niña and Articles about Natural Disasters, won the Science Knowledge Prize in the Thuta Swesone literary award in 2007.

Many of his presentations were at talks and seminars relating to climate change frequently both locally and internationally, in cities and villages in rural areas. Since his resignation from the DMH in 2009, Tun Lwin has served as a technical adviser to the Regional Integrated Multi-hazard Early Warning System (RIMES) at the Asian Institute of Technology in Thailand. He also served as a consultant to the Myanmar Red Cross Society, CARE Myanmar, Action Aid Myanmar and Myanmar Egress's Network Activities Group. He has also been involved with the International Centre for Water Hazard and Risk Management (ICHARM), Myanmar Egress, World Vision Myanmar, Global Green and other organizations, focusing primarily on climate change and how to minimize damage caused by natural disasters.

On December 10–11, 2009, Lwin presented his 30-page paper at a seminar hosted by the International Centre for Water Hazard (ICHARM) in Tsukuba, Japan, stressing the importance of awareness of storms, tsunamis and flooding in delta regions and potential natural disaster preparedness strategies in the region. In October 2010 he spoke to the Burmese media about the expected path of Cyclone Giri.

In 2011, he founded Tun Lwin Foundation. On the environmental conservation front, he was seriously opposed to the Myitsone Dam project slated for construction at the confluence of two rivers that gives rise to the Irrawaddy River. Though his health was already in decline, he showed up at an anti-dam event in Yangon in 2017 to deliver a strong statement, insisting, "I cannot accept any dam project on the Irrawaddy River". In 2017, he received the 7Day Heroes award for his non-profit work for the country in his field of meteorology, weather and climate.

== Personal life ==
He resided in Yangon, Myanmar with his wife, Mu Mu Than, and three children, two daughters and one son, of which the eldest is married with three children of her own.

Tun Lwin died on November 4, 2019, in Yangon at the age of 71.
