= Juan Carlos Scannone =

Argentine Jesuit professor and theologians (1931–2019)

Juan Carlos Scannone SJ
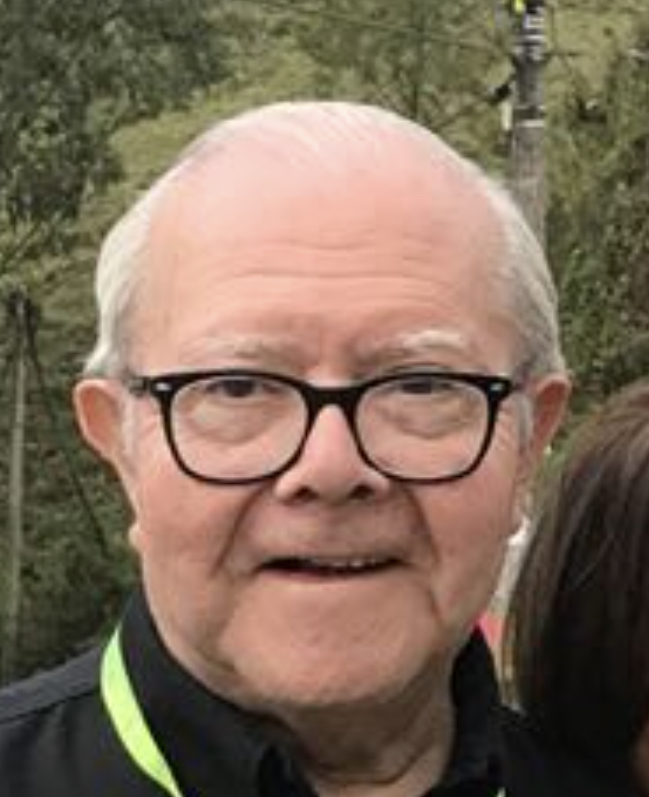
- Born: September 2, 1931; Buenos Aires, Argentina
- Died: November 27, 2019 (aged 88); San Miguel, Pca Buenos Aires, Argentina
- Occupation: Catholic Moral Theologian
- Known for: Theology professor to Pope Francis

Juan Carlos Scannone, SJ (2 September 1931 – 27 November 2019), was an Argentine Roman Catholic Jesuit priest.

Scannone entered the Society of Jesus in 1949. His academic career began in 1956 when he completed his studies of philosophy at the Philosophical and Theological Faculty of San Miguel in Buenos Aires Province, Argentina. He obtained a doctorate in theology with a thesis written in Innsbruck, directed by Karl Rahner, and one in philosophy with a dissertation on Maurice Blondel, presented at LMU Munich in Germany.

Scannone was an instructor in the Jesuit Seminary of San Miguel in Argentina. There, he was one of the main teachers of Jorge Bergoglio, who later became Pope Francis. Arguably, few theologians influenced Francis as much as Scannone. The pope refer to Scannone's work in his encyclical letter of 2015, Laudato si'. Scannone was also the leading Argentine formulator of the theology of the people, which is somewhat related to the philosophy and theology of liberation, or liberation theology. The principles of the theology of the people articulate a strong embrace of Christianity, coupled with locally initiated non-paternalistic ways to help the poor. This Argentine current of liberation theology, which greatly influenced Bergoglio, has other exponents such as Lucio Gera and Rafael Tello.

== Other source ==
- DePaul University speaker bio of Scannone
