= Vytautas Zabiela =

Lithuanian lawyer and politician (1930–2019)

Vytautas Zabiela (26 November 1930 – 1 November 2019) was a Lithuanian lawyer and politician who served as a member of Seimas between 2003 and 2004.

He was born in Berčiūnai, Lithuania on 26 November 1930. Zabiela was a graduate of the legal faculty of Vilnius University. He founded a law firm, Zabiela, Zabielaité and Partners in Vilnius in 1991. In 2000, he presided over a tribunal at the 2000 International Vilnius Tribunal on the Crimes of Communism.

He entered the Seimas on 1 November 2003 as a member of the Liberal Union of Lithuania.

Zabiela died on 1 November 2019 at the age of 88.
