= Fróso Spentzári =

Greek politician and pharmacist (1942–2019)

Efrosíni (Fróso) Spentzári (Greek: Ευφροσύνη Σπεντζάρη; 1942 – 8 November 2019), was a Greek pharmacist and conservative politician.

She was born in 1942 in Vartholomio and was a daughter of lawmaker Nikolaos Spentzaris. She studied at the Faculty of Medicine of the National and Kapodistrian University of Athens and was secretary general of the Panhellenic Pharmaceutical Association and vice president of the Panhellenic Association of Pharmacists.

Between 1981 and 1985, Spentzári was member of the Hellenic Parliament for New Democracy representing Elis. She died on 8 November 2019 at the age of 77, and was mother of a son.
