= André Bisson =

Canadian professor and businessman (1929–2019)

- Born: 7 October 1929; Trois-Rivières, Quebec, Canada
- Died: 25 November 2019 (aged 90); Montreal, Quebec, Canada
- Education: Harvard University
- Occupation: Professor

André Bisson, OC (7 October 1929 – 25 November 2019) was a Canadian professor and businessman.

== Biography ==
Bisson received an MBA from Harvard University. He became the Director of Business Administration at Université Laval after serving as a professor. He was also the Director of the Canadian Bankers Institute, and Managing Director of Scotiabank.
