= Alan Hagman =

American photojournalist (1964–2019)

- Born: January 11, 1964; Fort Wayne, Indiana, U.S.
- Died: November 11, 2019 (aged 55); Long Beach, California, U.S.
- Education: University of Kansas
- Occupation: Photographer

Alan Hagman (January 11, 1964 – November 11, 2019) was an American photojournalist for the Los Angeles Times from 1987 to his death. He covered many topics, including the Mexican drug war.
