= Tim Fasano =

American Bigfoot hunter, blogger and author (1956–2019)

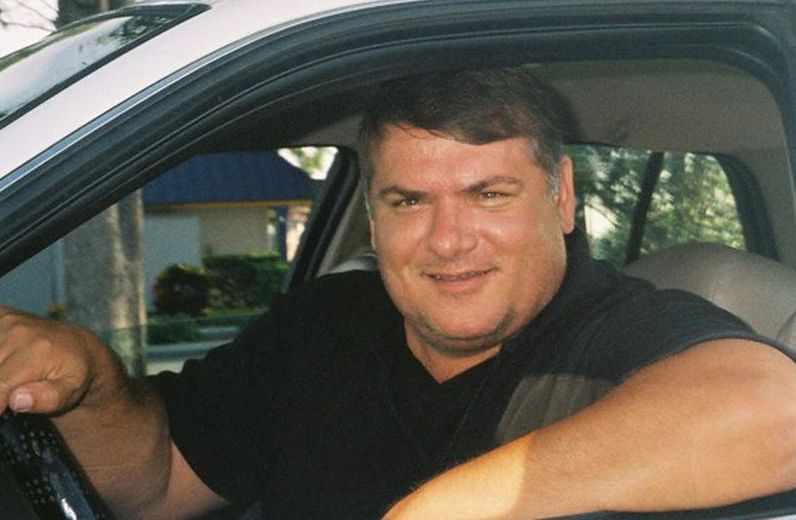
Tim in his cab

Tim Fasano (September 13, 1956 – November 14, 2019) was an American Bigfoot hunter, blogger, author, and taxicab driver who was written about in various publications, including the Tampa Bay Times, The Palm Beach Post, and U.S. News & World Report.

Fasano ran a blog called "Tampa Taxi Shots" about his experiences driving a cab in Tampa, Florida. The blog was popular and gained the attention of The Tampa Tribune and the St. Petersburg Times. In 2009, he began exploring the swamps and forests of Florida in search of the elusive Skunk ape or Florida Bigfoot – a decade-long exploration he chronicled in his blog "Sasquatch Evidence" and on his YouTube channel, to which he uploaded over 1,300 videos, some with over a million hits. In 2020, his memoir, The Cabbie's Tale, was published posthumously by Coyote Canyon Press.
