= Benedict de Tscharner =

Swiss writer and diplomat (1937–2019)

Switzerland Ambassador to France
- In office 1997–2002

Personal details
- Born: 18 July 1937 Trub, Switzerland
- Died: 12 November 2019 (aged 82) Geneva, Switzerland
- Occupation: Writer; Diplomat

Benedict de Tscharner (18 July 1937 – 12 November 2019) was a Swiss writer and diplomat.

== Publications ==
- Profession ambassadeur : diplomate suisse en France (2002)
- Johann Konrad Kern : homme d'État et diplomate (2005)
- Giuseppe Motta : homme d'État suisse (2007)
- Albert Gallatin : genevois au service des États-Unis d'Amérique (2008)
- Soldats : diversité des destins d'hier et d'aujourd'hui (2010)
- Suissesses dans le monde (with Laurence Deonna) (2010)
- INTER GENTES : hommes d'État, diplomates, penseurs politiques (2012)
