= Michael Wright (academic) =

British academic (1952–2019)

Michael Wright (1952 – 25 November 2019) was a fellow of the British Academy elected in 2016 and Professor of Entrepreneurship at Imperial College Business School. Wright was also Director of the Centre for Management Buy-out Research, the first centre to be established devoted to the study of private equity and buyouts, which was founded in March 1986 at the Nottingham University Business School. He wrote over 40 books and more than 300 papers in academic and professional journals on management buy-outs, venture capital, habitual entrepreneurs, academic entrepreneurs, and related topics. Wright was a Fellow of the British Academy, Academy of Social Sciences and The British Academy of Management. Wright made an outstanding contribution to the business and management research community and was one of Britain's best-known academics.
