= Jacques Barreau =

French footballer 1923–2019

Jacques Gabriel Barreau
Personal information
- Date of birth: 21 January 1923
- Place of birth: Levallois-Perret, France
- Date of death: 11 November 2019 (aged 96)
- Place of death: Courbevoie, France
- Position: Midfielder

Senior career*
Years	Team	Apps	(Gls)
- RC Paris

International career
1952	France	1	(0)
- * Club domestic league appearances and goals

Jacques Gabriel Barreau (21 January 1923 – 11 November 2019) was a French footballer who played as a midfielder. He competed in the men's tournament at the 1952 Summer Olympics.
