= Johannes Michalski =

Belgian-born American painter (c.1936–2019)

- Born: c. 1936; Belgium
- Died: November 4, 2019 (aged 83); St. George, Utah, U.S.
- Education: Académie Royale des Beaux-Arts
- Occupation: Painter

Johannes Michalski (c. 1936 – November 4, 2019) was a Belgian-born American painter. A double amputee, he painted by holding the brush with his mouth.

== Early life ==
Born on 10 December 1936 in Vucht, Belgium to Anton Michalski and Cecelia Walchzak. He was the youngest of three siblings, raised by a single mother after losing his father to suicide at the age of two.

Johannes spent many of his childhood years in orphanages suffering lots of physical and emotional abuse because of his mother's struggle to find work and an environment safe for him and his siblings which resulted from war that happened in Europe as at the time.

He lost both of his arms at the age of ten in an electrocution accident when he grabbed a power line with his hands by mistake and fell from the electrical pole. He struggled to survive the incident and spent many years after to relearn using his mouth and feet the most basic tasks of daily living.

== Career ==
At the age of 19, Johannes was discovered by the Association of Mouth and Foot Painting Artists and awarded him a scholarship to attend Académie royale des Beaux-Arts de Bruxelles where he graduated with distinctions.

== Personal life ==
Johannes was a father to his only son Jean-Marie Michalski whom he raised as a single dad from the age of 15 months. In 1982 he and Jean-Marie immigrated to the United States where he eventually settled in St. George, Utah. He died at the age of 84, survived by his son, Jean-Marie and two grandchildren Kaylie and Macie Michalski.

== Works ==
- Michalski, Johannes; Fryer, S. Deborah (2013). With a Brush in my Mouth: The Autobiography of Johannes Michalski. St. George, Utah: Synergy Books Publishing. ISBN 9781936434503. OCLC 858560055.
