= Susan Cernyak-Spatz =

Austrian professor of German language and literature

- fair use image only
- Born: Susan Eckstein; July 27, 1922; Vienna
- Died: November 17, 2019 (aged 97); Charlotte, North Carolina
- Other names: Susan Fishman, Suzanne Cernyak
- Occupations: professor of German, memoirist

Susan E. Cernyak-Spatz (July 27, 1922 – November 17, 2019) was an Austrian-born professor of German language and literature at the University of North Carolina at Charlotte. She was a Holocaust survivor. Her memoir, Protective Custody: Prisoner 34042, was published in 2005.

== Early life and education ==
Susan Eckstein was born in Vienna, the daughter of Ernest Eckstein and Frieda Eckstein. The Ecksteins were Jewish. At the onset of World War II, she and her mother were deported to live at Theresienstadt. She survived two years at the Auschwitz-Birkenau death camp, from 1943 to 1945, the winter death march away from Auschwitz, and a shorter spell at Ravensbrück in 1945. She worked as an interpreter after liberation, for American intelligence and the British military.

Eckstein attended school in Berlin and Vienna as a girl in the early 1930s. She finished undergraduate studies at Southwest Missouri State College in 1968, and earned her doctoral degree at the University of Kansas in 1972. While she was a student, she received a Woodrow Wilson National Fellowship.

== Career ==
She taught German language and literature at the University of North Carolina, Charlotte, from 1972 until her retirement in 1992. She created the university's Holocaust Studies program. In retirement, into her nineties, she continued giving interviews, lectures to community groups, and talks to high schoolers, on her own experiences during the war. A video of her story, Surviving Birkenau, was released in 2018.

She wrote a memoir in English, Protective Custody: Prisoner 34042 (2005), and another in German, Theresienstadt, Auschwitz-Birkenau, Ravensbrück. Drei Stationen meines Lebens (Theresienstadt, Auschwitz-Birkenau, Ravensbrück. Three stages of my life) (2008). Protective Custody was adapted for the stage. In 1983 she attended the first conference to look at role of women during the holocaust. It was organised by Dr Joan Ringelheim and Esther Katz. She was asked what women talked about and she said, "Food! I never cooked as well as I did with my mouth in Auschwitz." She also wrote a textbook, German Holocaust Literature (1985). and co-edited Language and Culture: A Transcending Bond- Essays and Memoirs by American Germanists of Austro-Jewish Descent (1994, with Charles S. Merrill).

She translated several works from German into English, including Bernhard Frankfurter's The Meeting, based on a 1988 film in which a Holocaust survivor, Dagmar Ostermann, confronted a Nazi physician, Hans Wilhelm Münch.

== Personal life ==
Susan Eckstein married Bernard M. Fishman, an American serviceman, in Brussels, and moved to the United States with him in 1946. They had three children. They divorced in the 1960s. She married Turkish-born Henri Cernyak as her second husband during graduate school, in 1970. Her third husband Hardy Spatz, who was born in Austria and lived in Cuba, died in 2001. She died in 2019, aged 97 years, at her home in Charlotte. "Susan’s story was just invaluable," said her rabbi in Charlotte, Judy Schindler. "When she conveyed it to students, they could take her story and take it into their souls, and hear the lessons she had to teach, based on her experiences, and try to create a much better tomorrow."
