= Zhang Qi (physician) =

Chinese physician (1922–2019)

Zhang Qi (Chinese: 张琪; 14 November 1922 – 13 November 2019) was a Chinese physician, professor and doctoral advisor at Heilongjiang University of Chinese Medicine. He was named a "Master of National Medicine" of China in 2009 and won the Bethune Medal.

== Biography ==
Zhang Qi was born on 14 November 1922 in Laoting County, Hebei, Republic of China. He studied traditional Chinese medicine with his grandfather, and began practicing medicine at age 20, starting a medical career spanning more than 76 years.

Zhang served as researcher and vice president of Heilongjiang Provincial Chinese Medicine Institute and as professor and doctoral advisor at Heilongjiang University of Chinese Medicine, with a specialization in the treatment and research of kidney diseases. His research won more than ten provincial and ministerial awards. He advised 40 doctoral students, 13 master's students, and three post-doctoral researchers. He also published eight books. His daughter, Zhang Peiqing (张佩青), studied under him and is a physician at Heilongjiang Provincial Chinese Medicine Institute.

He was named a "Master of National Medicine" of China in 2009, and won the Bethune Medal. In September 2019, he was among the 80 recipients of the National Outstanding Contribution in Chinese Medicine Award. He served as a delegate to the 5th and 6th National People's Congresses.

Zhang died on 13 November 2019, a day before his 97th birthday.
