= Zhang Qi (Song dynasty) =

Zhang Qi (張耆)

Personal details
- Born: late 960s or early 970s likely Kaifeng, Northern Song
- Died: 1048 Kaifeng, Northern Song
- Children: Zhang Deyi (張得一), son; Zhang Keyi (張可一), son; Zhang Liyi (張利一), son; Zhang Chengyi (張誠一), son; Zhang Xiyi (張希一), son; Zhang Liyi (張利一), son; 18 other sons

Zhang Qi (died 1048), originally named Zhang Min, was a high-ranking official and military general of the Northern Song dynasty of China. He was one of the longest-serving ministers during Emperor Zhenzong's reign. He also served the assistant commissioner and commissioner of military affairs from 1025 to 1033 during the regency of Emperor Zhenzong's widow Empress Dowager Liu. He was well trusted by both Emperor Zhenzong and Empress Dowager Liu mainly because he had been their personal servant when all 3 were teenagers.
