= Cui Yi (general) =

Chinese lieutenant general (1930–2019)

Cui Yi (Chinese: 崔毅; April 1930 – 21 November 2019) was a lieutenant general of the Chinese People's Liberation Army. He served as Director of the Organization Department of the PLA General Political Department and Deputy Political Commissar of the Commission for Science, Technology and Industry for National Defense.

== Biography ==
Cui was born in April 1930 in Penglai, Shandong, Republic of China. His original name was Zhao Rihui (赵日惠). He joined the Chinese Communist Party in 1945 and the People's Liberation Army in 1946. During the Chinese Civil War, he participated in the battles of Guanzhuang 官庄, Jiafengshan 贾峰山, and Wutai 五台, and served as a battalion-level political instructor.

After the founding of the People's Republic of China in 1949, he served as a company-level officer, and rose through the ranks to director of the political department of a division. He later served as Director of the Organization Department of the PLA General Political Department and Deputy Political Commissar of the Commission for Science, Technology and Industry for National Defense.

Cui attained the military rank of senior captain in 1955. He was promoted to major general in 1988 and lieutenant general in 1990. He was a representative of the 13th and 14th National Congress of the Chinese Communist Party, a member of the 14th Central Commission for Discipline Inspection, and a delegate to the 9th National People's Congress.

Cui died on 21 November 2019 in Beijing, aged 89.
