= 2019 in New Zealand =

- Decades: 1990s; 2000s; 2010s; 2020s
- See also: History of New Zealand; List of years in New Zealand; Timeline of New Zealand history

The following lists events that happened during 2019 in New Zealand.

== Incumbents ==
=== Regal and vice-regal ===
- Head of State – Elizabeth II
- Governor-General – Patsy Reddy
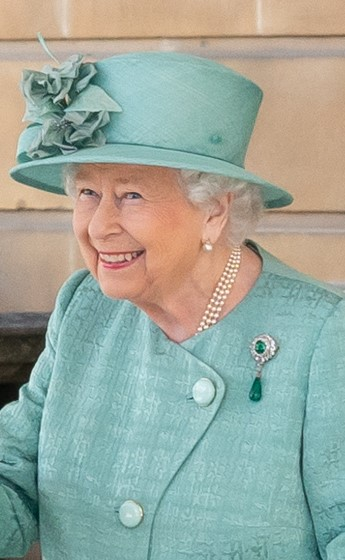
Elizabeth II

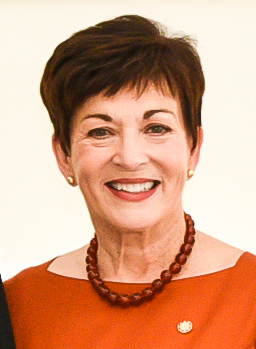
Patsy Reddy

=== Government ===
The Sixth Labour Government, elected in 2017, continues.

- Speaker of the House – Trevor Mallard
- Prime Minister – Jacinda Ardern
- Deputy Prime Minister – Winston Peters
- Leader of the House – Chris Hipkins
- Minister of Finance – Grant Robertson
- Minister of Foreign Affairs – Winston Peters
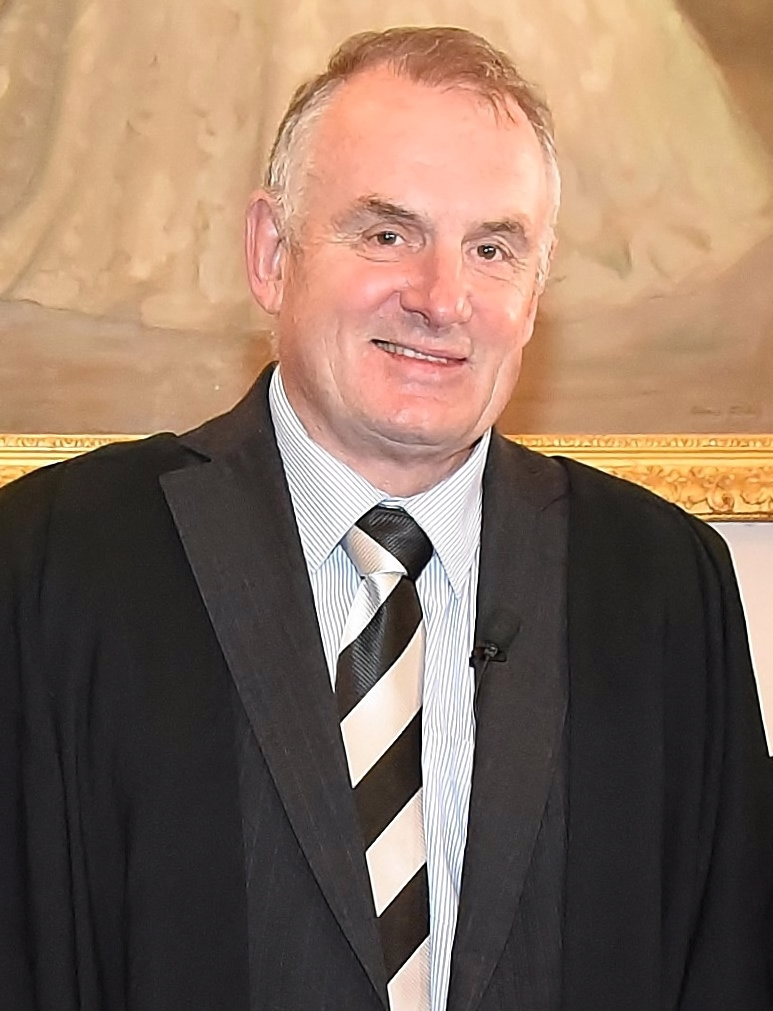
Trevor Mallard

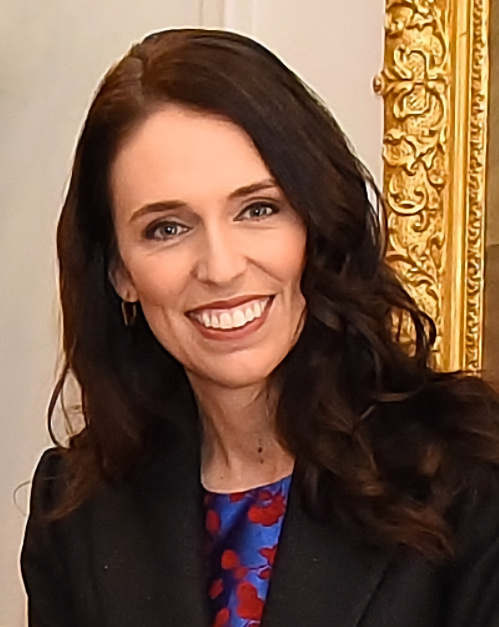
Jacinda Ardern

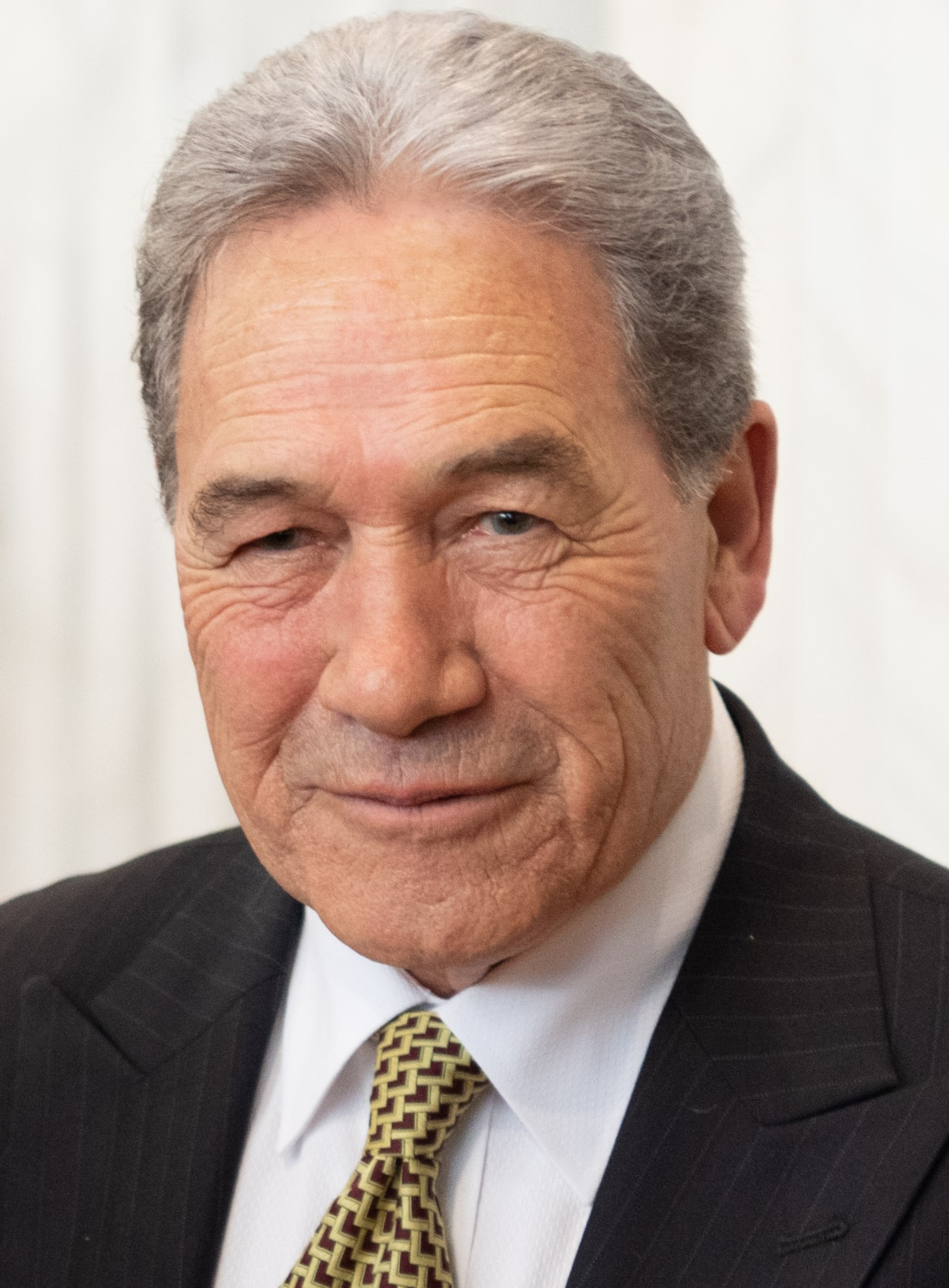
Winston Peters

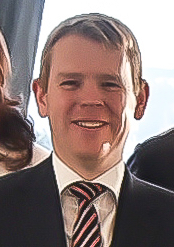
Chris Hipkins

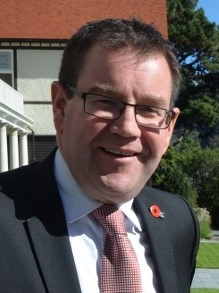
Grant Robertson

=== Other party leaders in parliament ===
- National – Simon Bridges (Leader of the Opposition)
- New Zealand First – Winston Peters
- Green – James Shaw and Marama Davidson
- ACT – David Seymour
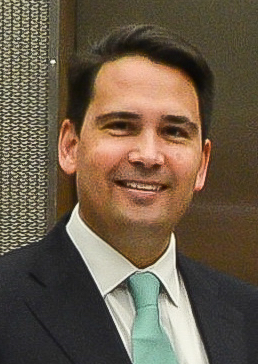
Simon Bridges

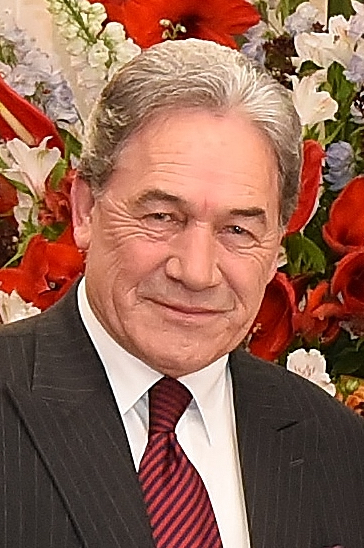
Winston Peters

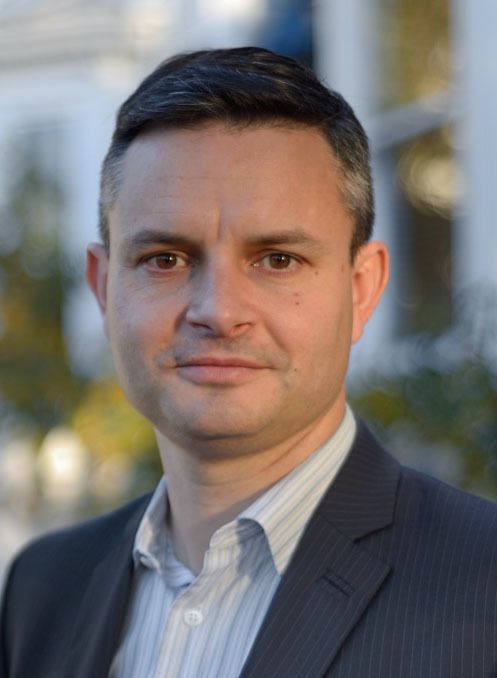
James Shaw

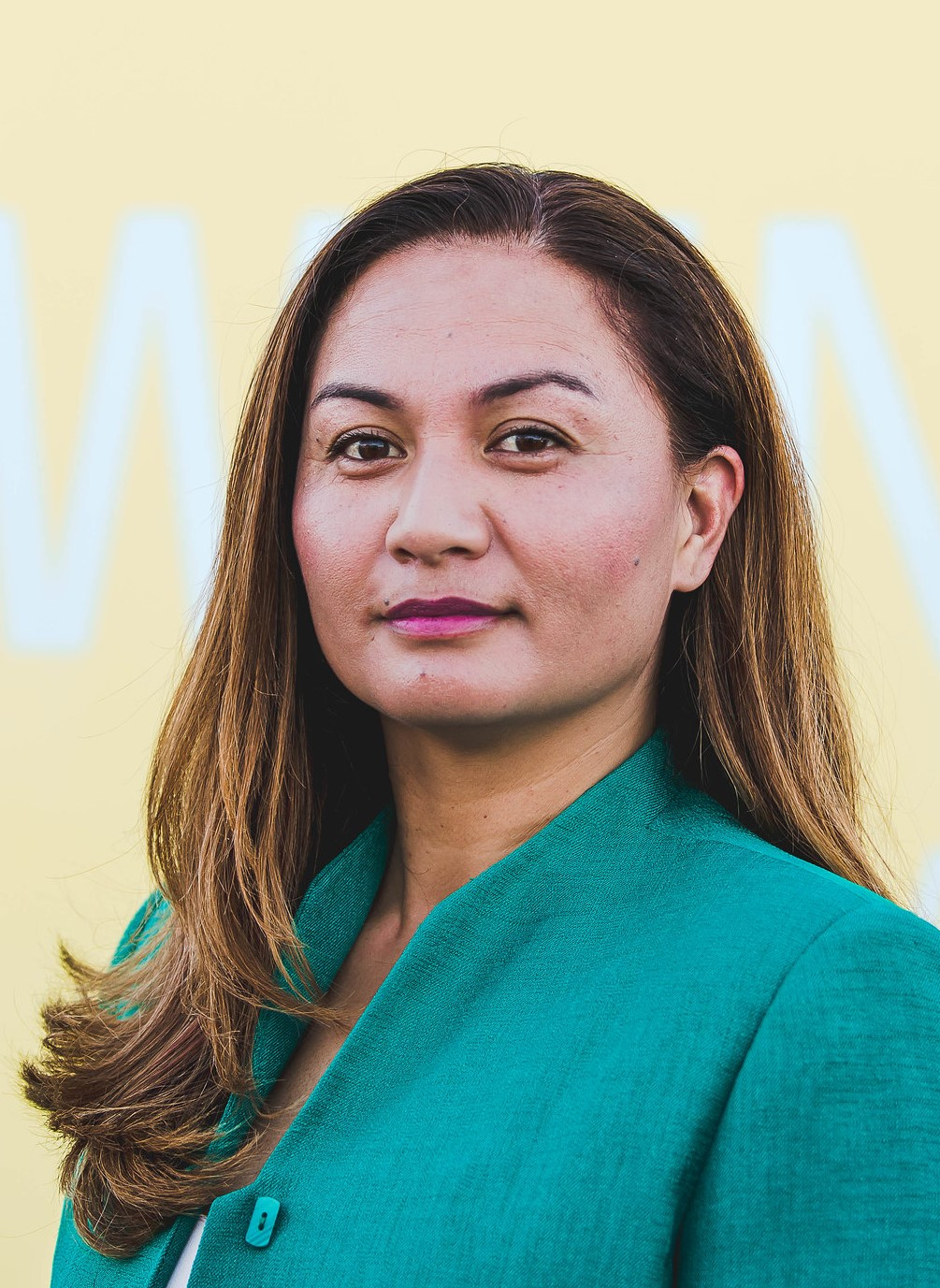
Marama Davidson

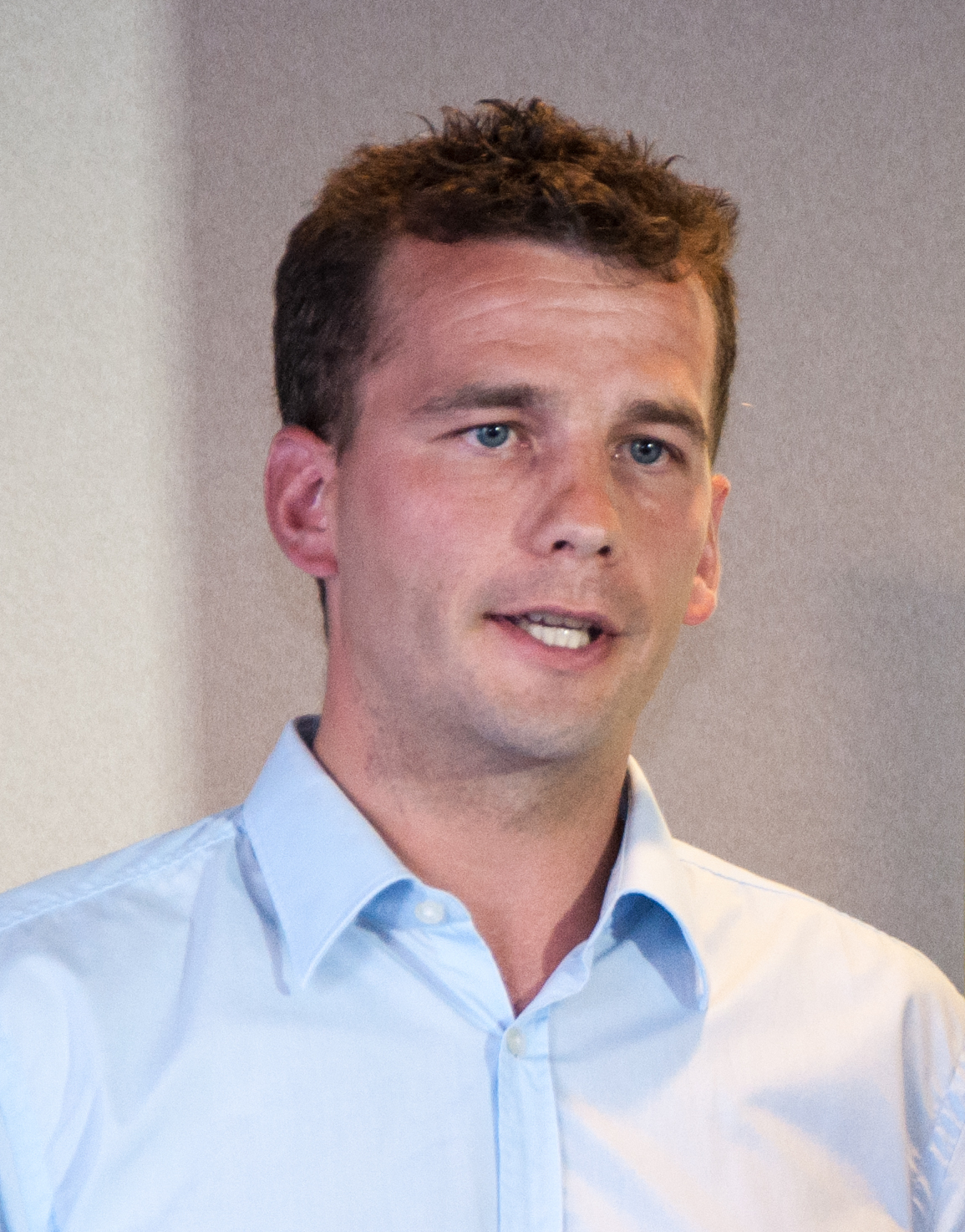
David Seymour

=== Judiciary ===
- Chief Justice – Sian Elias until 13 March, then Helen Winkelmann
- President of the Court of Appeal – Stephen Kós
- Chief High Court judge – Geoffrey Venning
- Chief District Court judge – Jan-Marie Doogue, then from 27 September Heemi Taumaunu
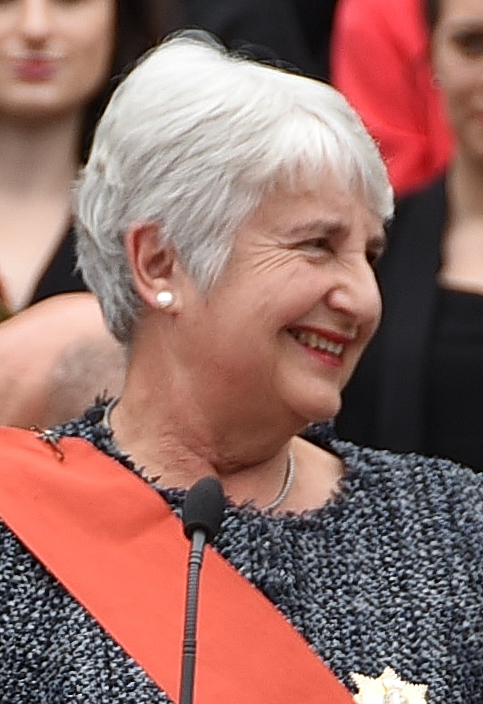
Sian Elias

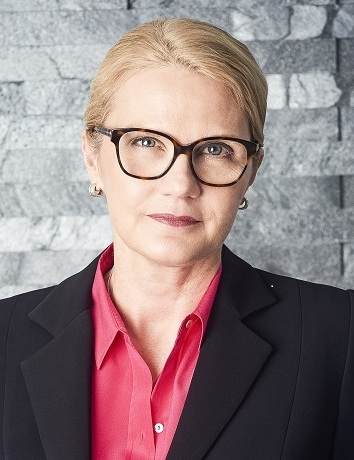
Helen Winkelmann

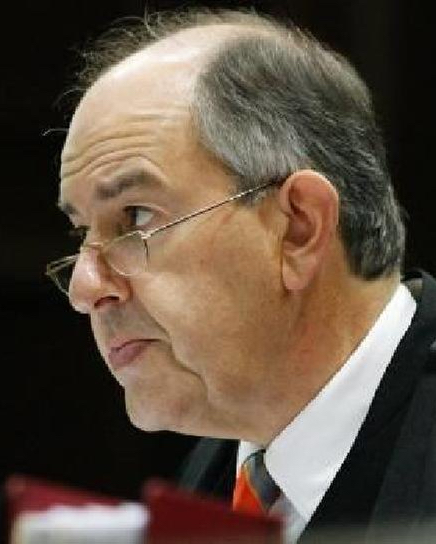
Stephen Kós

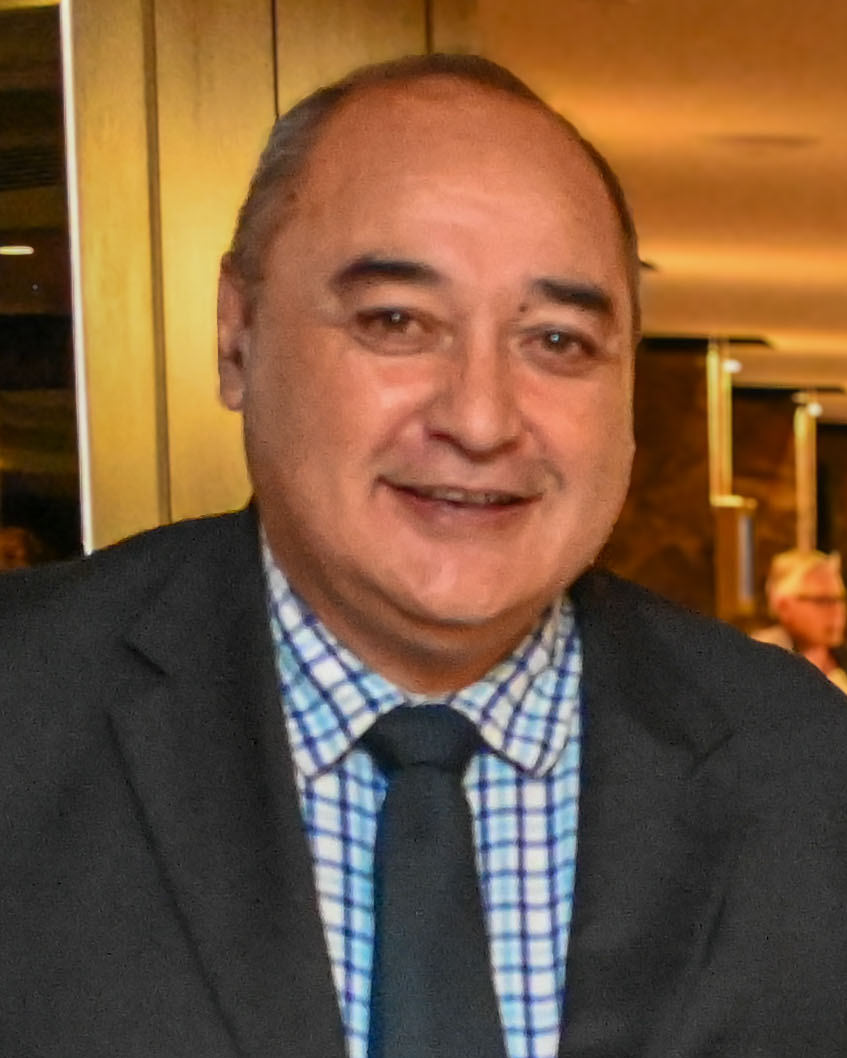
Heemi Taumaunu

=== Main centre leaders ===
- Mayor of Auckland – Phil Goff
- Mayor of Tauranga – Greg Brownless, then from 24 October Tenby Powell
- Mayor of Hamilton – Andrew King, then from 24 October Paula Southgate
- Mayor of Wellington – Justin Lester, then from 30 October Andy Foster
- Mayor of Christchurch – Lianne Dalziel
- Mayor of Dunedin – Dave Cull, then from 25 October Aaron Hawkins
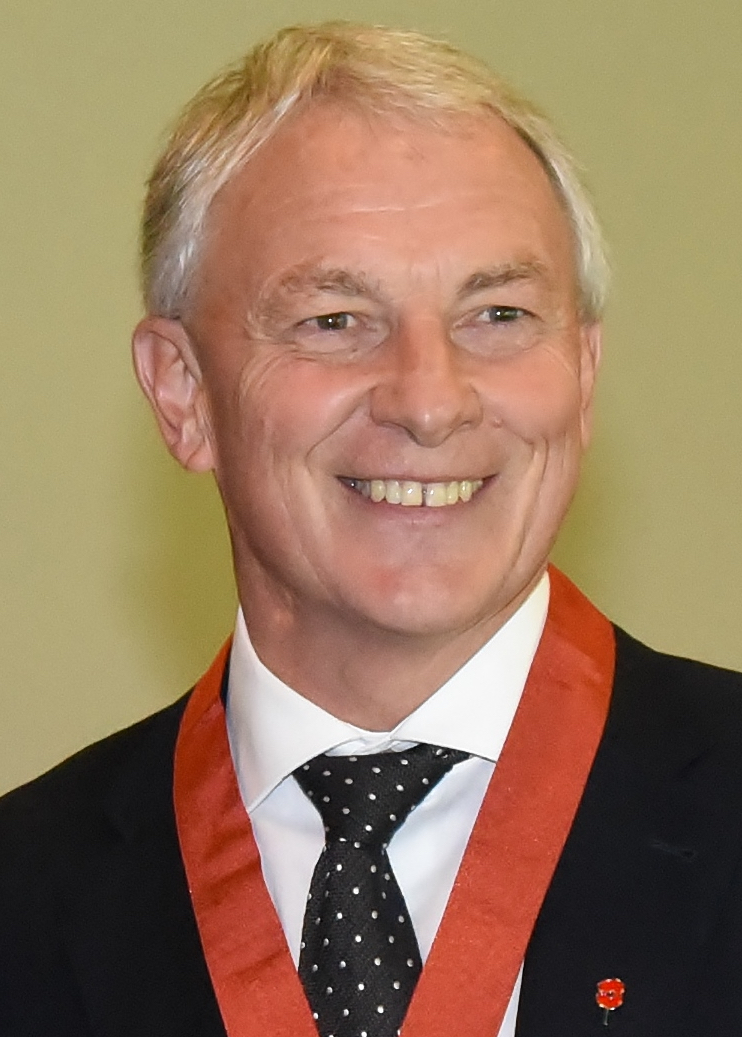
Phil Goff

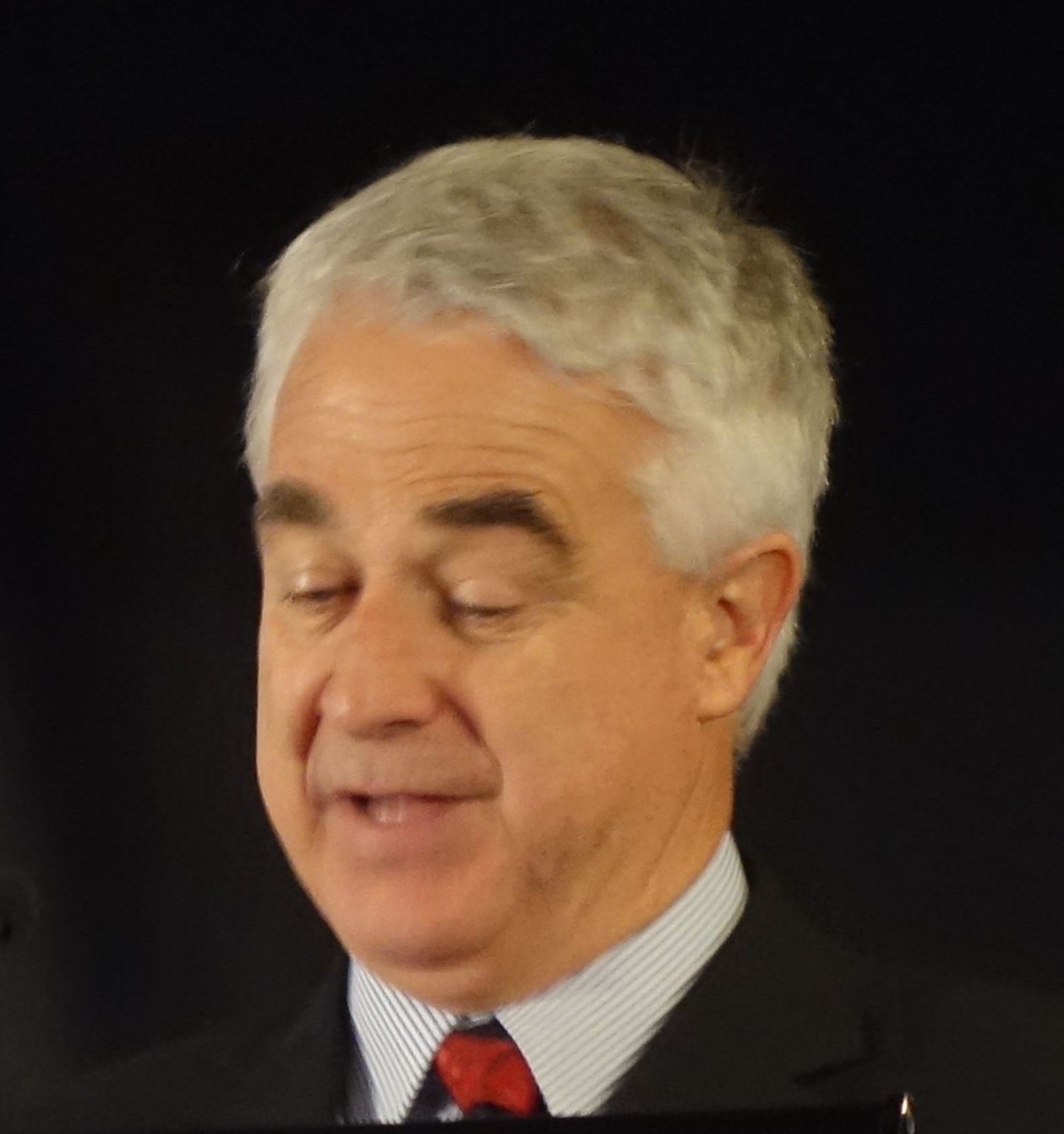
Greg Brownless

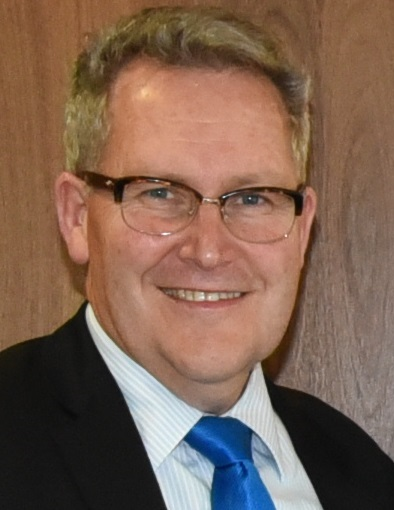
Andrew King

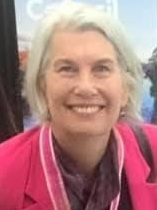
Paula Southgate

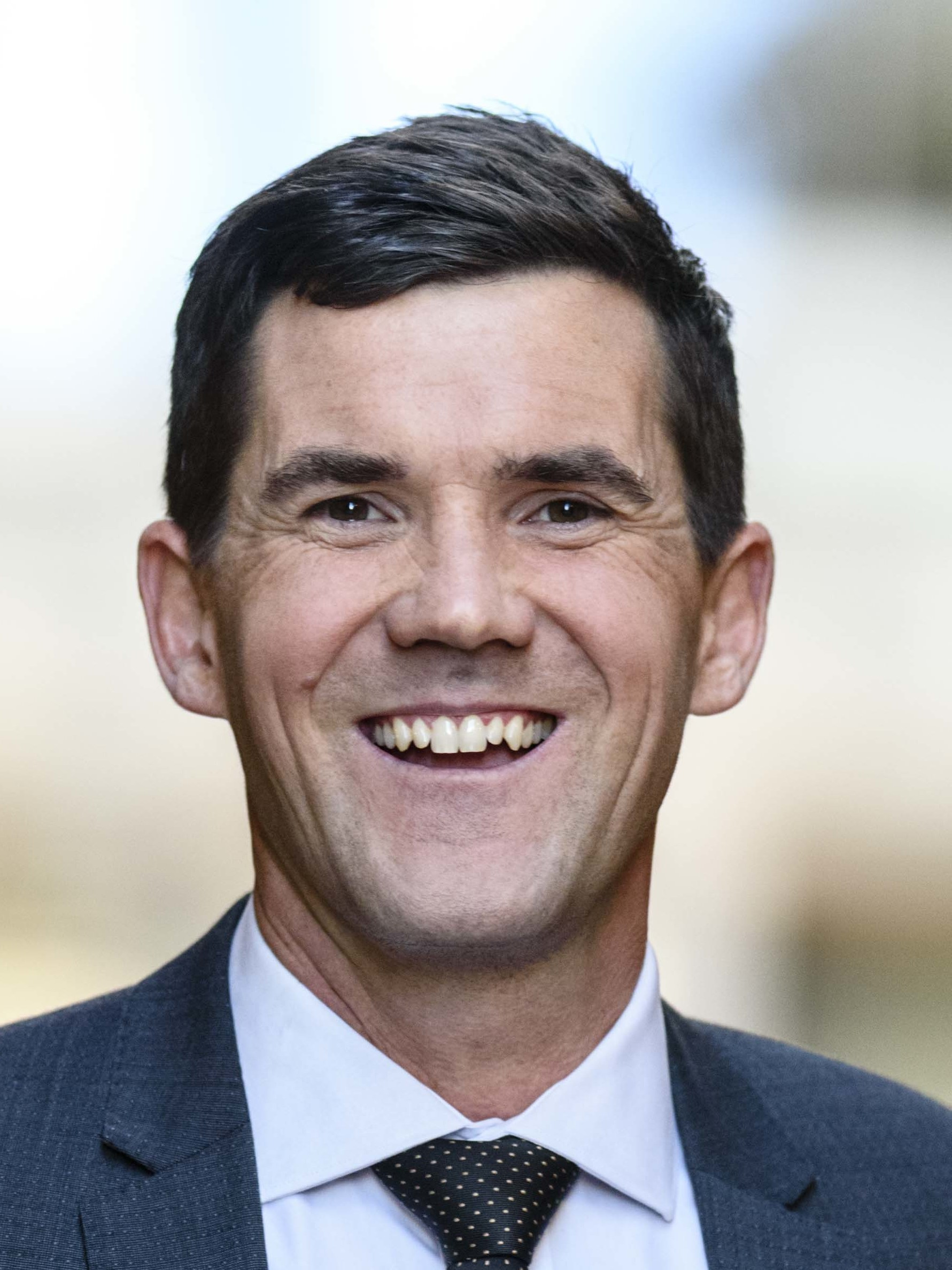
Justin Lester

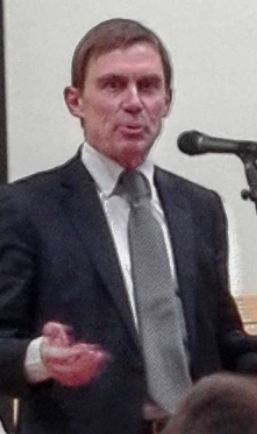
Andy Foster

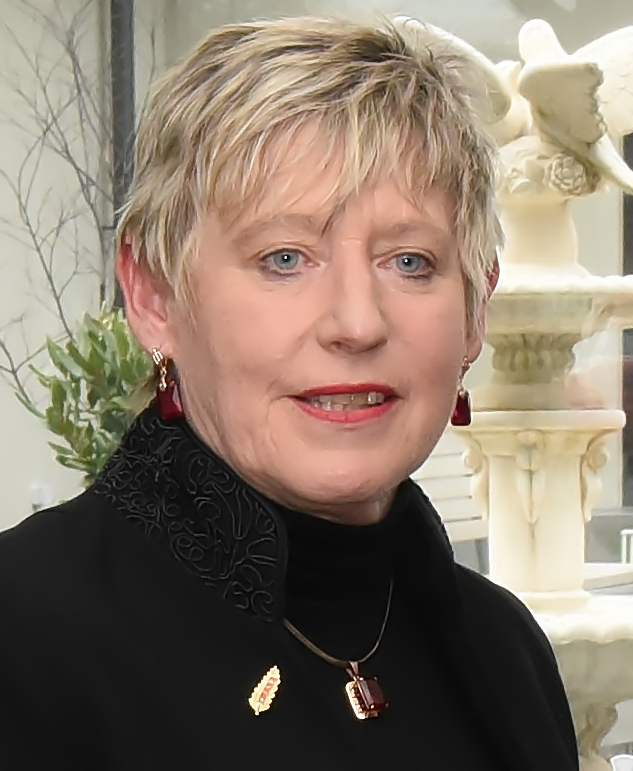
Lianne Dalziell

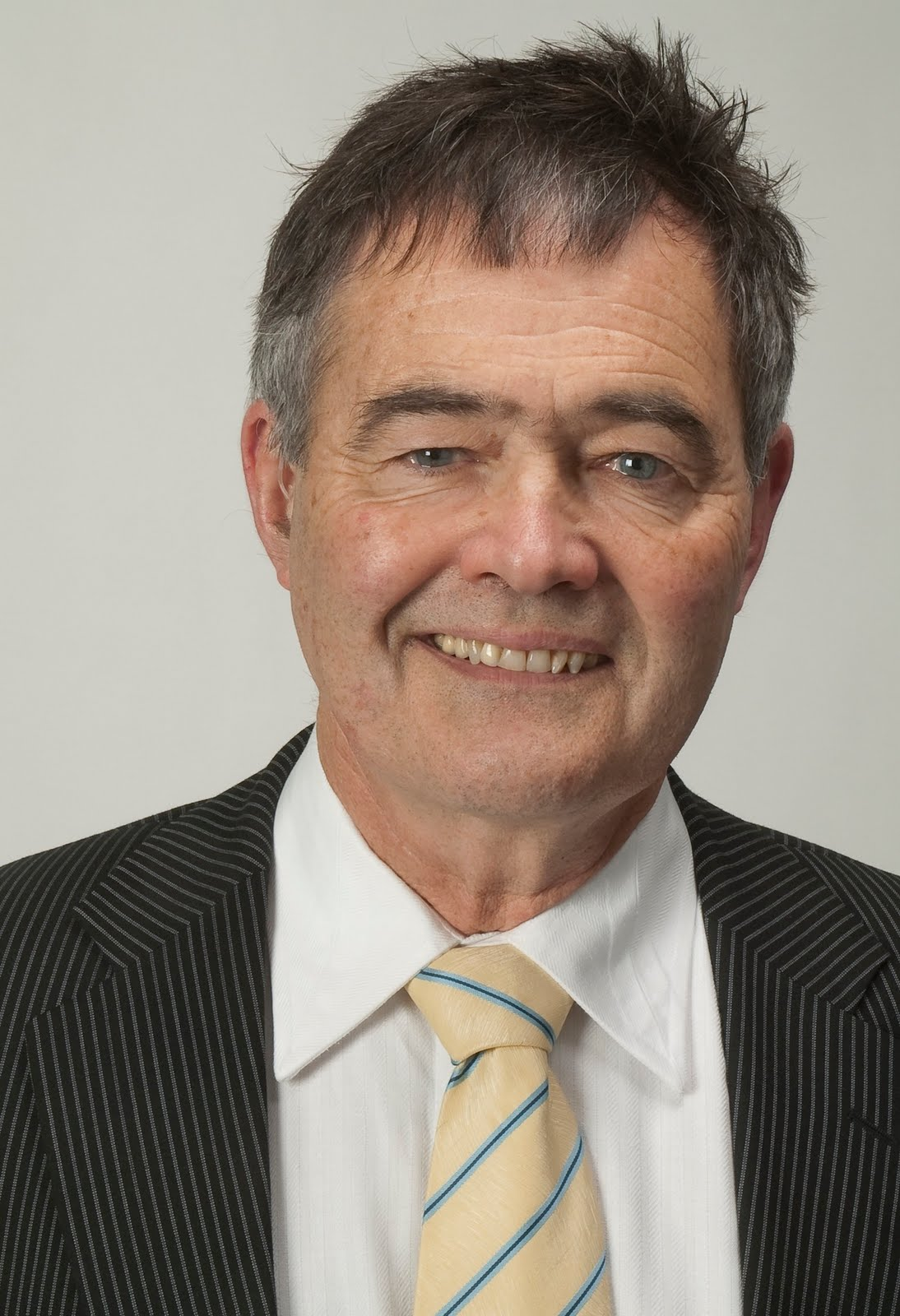
Dave Cull

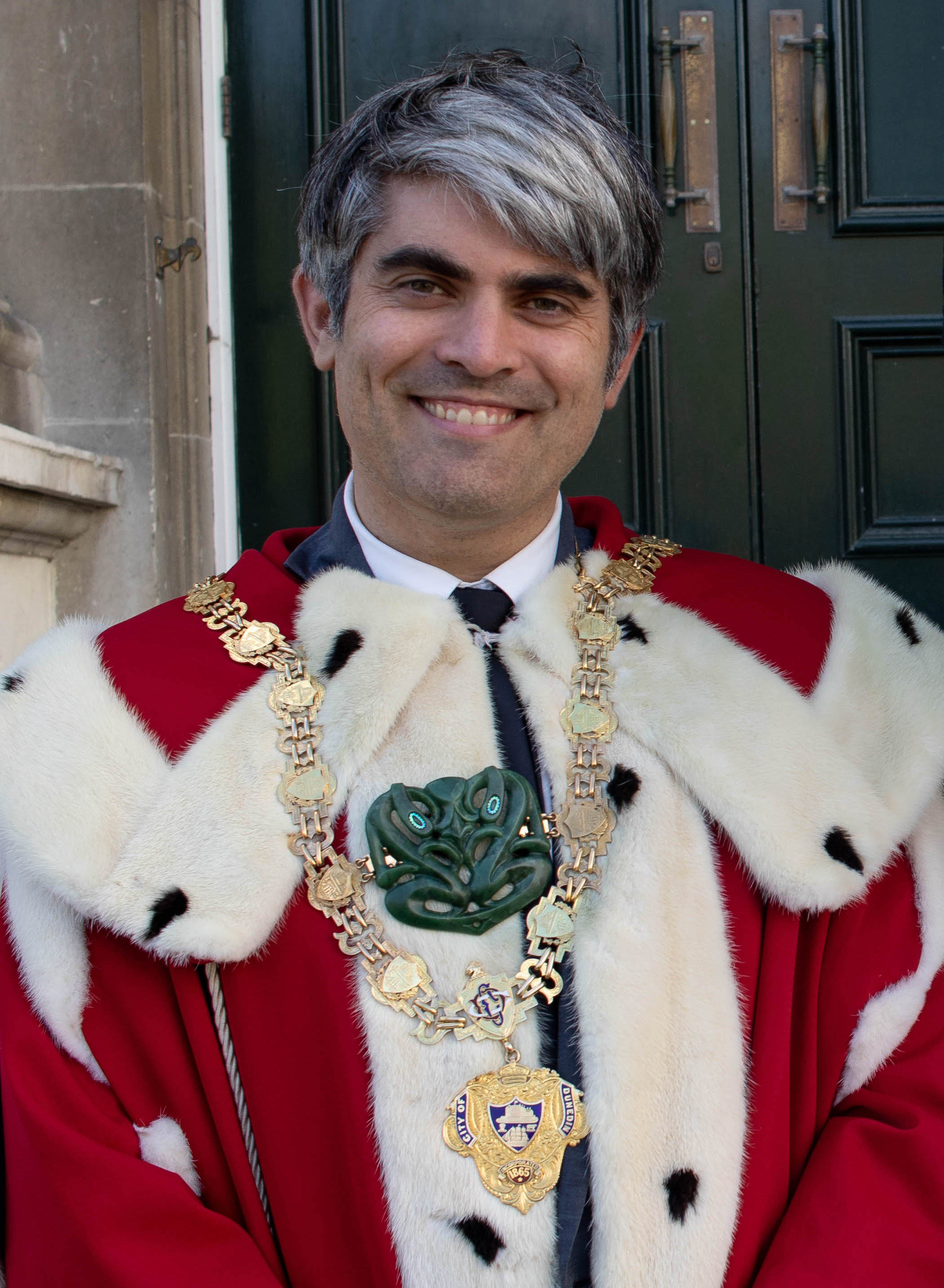
Aaron Hawkins

== Events ==
=== January ===
- 14 January – Cryptocurrency exchange Cryptopia is hacked in one of the biggest heists in New Zealand history.
- 23 January – A cliffside at Cape Kidnappers collapses, seriously injuring two tourists.

=== February ===
- 5 February – 6 March – Wildfires in Nelson cause thousands to evacuate their homes.

=== March ===
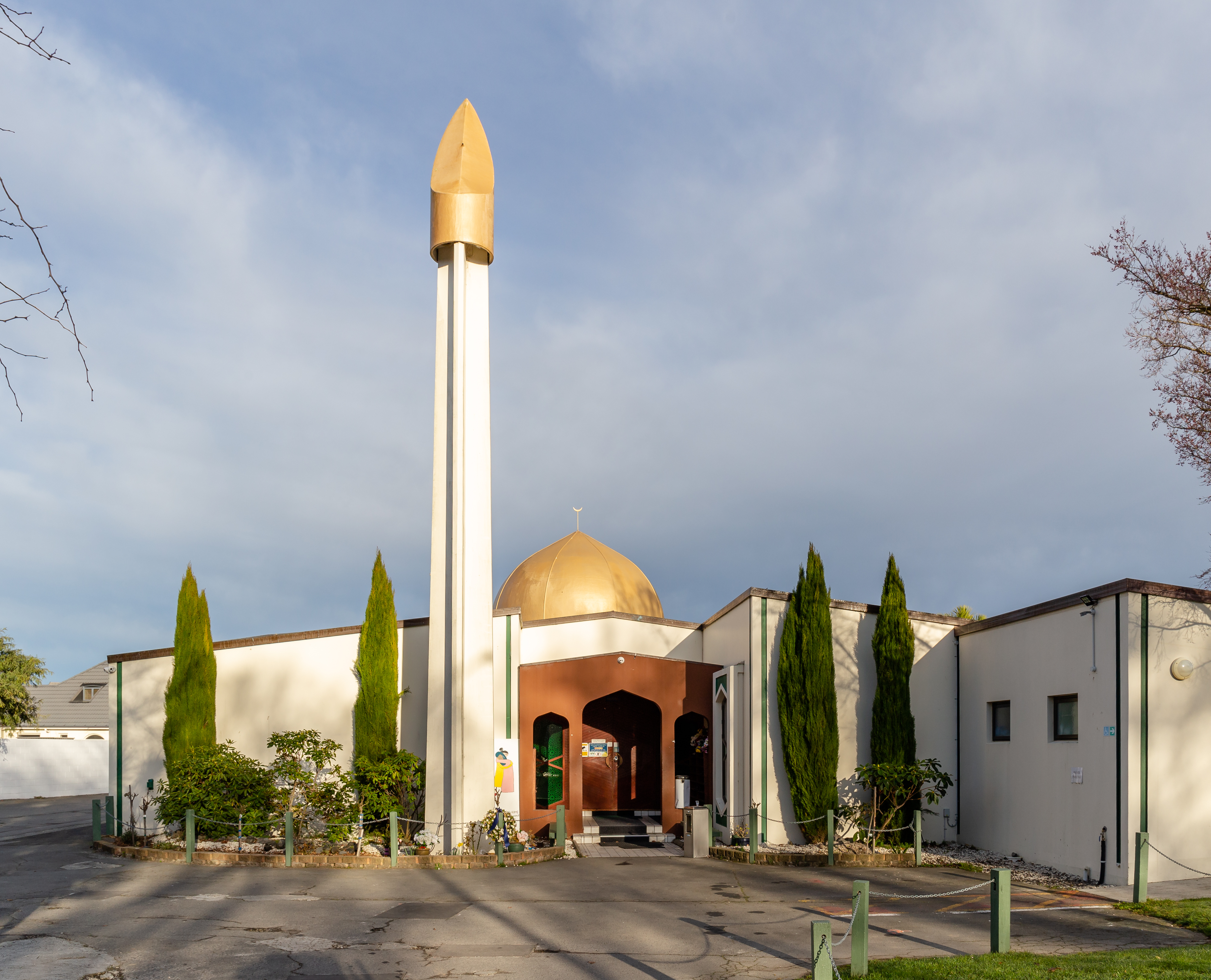
Al Noor Mosque in 2019

- 8 March – Ngā Puna Wai Sports Hub opens.
- 15 March – Shootings at two Christchurch mosques result in the deaths of 51 people.
- 16 March – Sky News Australia is pulled off the air by independently owned Sky New Zealand. The decision was made after the channel refused to stop showing graphic video footage that had been live-streamed by the Christchurch shooter at the two mosques in Christchurch.
- 19 March – Wellington Central Library closes indefinitely due to the building's earthquake vulnerabilities.
- 26 March – A state of emergency is declared in the Westland District due to severe weather.

=== May ===
- 21 May – Mine re-entry efforts into the Pike River Mine begin.
- 30 May – The 2019 New Zealand budget is presented to Parliament by the Minister of Finance, Grant Robertson.

=== June ===
- 3 June – The 2019 Queen's Birthday Honours are announced.
- 26 June – The primary school teachers' union New Zealand Educational Institute (NZEI) accepts the Government's NZ$1.5 billion collective agreement, which includes a new, unified pay scale. While primary teachers voted to accept the Government's offer, primary principals rejected the offer, demanding better pay and working conditions.
- 28 June – The secondary teachers' union the Post Primary Teachers' Association voted to accept the Government's pay offer.

=== July ===
- 19 July – A Christchurch house destroyed in a gas explosion results in six people being hospitalised.
- 26 July – The NZEI's kindergarten teacher members voted to accept a pay parity agreement with the Ministry of Education

=== October ===
- 12 October – (Postal) voting for the 2019 local elections concludes.
- 22 October – The Skycity Convention Centre catches fire while still under construction, causing significant disruption in the Auckland CBD.

=== November ===
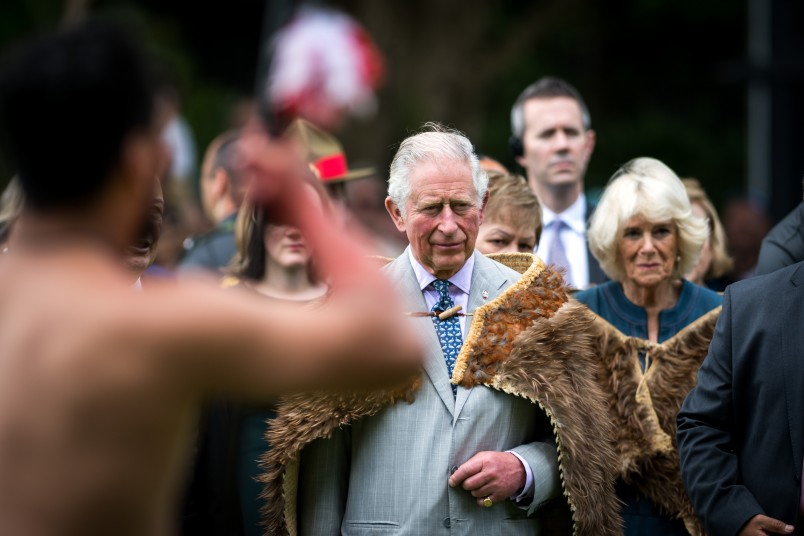
Prince Charles and Camilla at Waitangi

- 17–23 November – Prince Charles and Camilla, Duchess of Cornwall, make an official visit to Auckland, Northland, Christchurch and Kaikōura.
- 19 November – The Disney+ streaming service launches in New Zealand.
- 20 November – A severe hailstorm in Timaru occurs, with hail stones reaching the size of golf balls. Insurance claims totalled $170 million, making it, at the time, the costliest New Zealand weather event in the 21st century.

=== December ===
- 8 December – Severe rain causes landslides and flooding in the South Island, closing two state highways (SH 1 and SH 6) and Inland Scenic Route 72, and trapping 1000 tourists in South Westland.
- 9 December – Whakaari / White Island erupts, killing 21 and injuring 26.
- 19 December – Sky New Zealand acquires Spark New Zealand's Lightbox streaming service in order to merge it with its own Neon streaming service.
- 31 December – The 2020 New Year Honours are announced.

== Holidays and observances ==
Public holidays in New Zealand in 2019 are as follows:

- 1 January – New Year's Day
- 2 January – Day after New Year's Day
- 6 February – Waitangi Day
- 19 April – Good Friday
- 21 April – Easter Sunday
- 22 April – Easter Monday
- 25 April – Anzac Day
- 3 June – Queen's Birthday
- 28 October – Labour Day
- 25 December – Christmas Day
- 26 December – Boxing Day

== Sports ==
=== Cycling ===
- 27 January – Aaron Gate wins the New Zealand Cycle Classic

=== Rowing ===
- New Zealand Secondary School Championships (Maadi Cup)
  - Maadi Cup (boys U18 eight) – Christchurch Boys' High School
  - Levin 75th Jubilee Cup (girls U18 eight) – St Margaret's College
  - Star Trophy (overall points) – Christchurch Boys' High School

=== Shooting ===
- Ballinger Belt –
  - Jim Bailey (Australia)
  - John Snowden (Ashburton), second, top New Zealander

=== Rugby union ===
- England beat the All Blacks 19–7 in the semifinal of the 2019 Rugby World Cup

== Births ==
- 28 September – Sharp 'N' Smart, Thoroughbred racehorse
- 15 November – Legarto, Thoroughbred racehorse

== Deaths ==
=== January ===
- 1 January
  - Ross Allen, cricket umpire and local politician, chair of Taranaki Regional Council (1989–2001) (born 1928).
  - Elizabeth Edgar, botanist (DSIR, Landcare Research), Hutton Medal (2000) (born 1929).
- 11 January – Wayne Blair, cricketer (Otago) (born 1948).
- 18 January – Reg Hart, rugby league player (national team) (born 1936).
- 20 January – Ian Shirley, social work and public policy academic (Massey University, Auckland University of Technology), social justice advocate (born 1940).
- 23 January
  - Aloysius Pang, Singaporean actor (born 1990).
  - Don Stark, cricketer (Canterbury) (born 1930).
- 25 January – Sir John Jeffries, politician, lawyer and jurist, Deputy Mayor of Wellington (1971–1974), chairmain of Air New Zealand (1975), judge of the High Court (1976–1992), head of the Police Complaints Authority (1992–1997), chair of the New Zealand Press Council (1997–2005) (born 1929).
- 26 January – John Henderson, cricketer (Central Districts (born 1928).
- 30 January – Murray Loudon, Olympic field hockey player (1956) (born 1931).
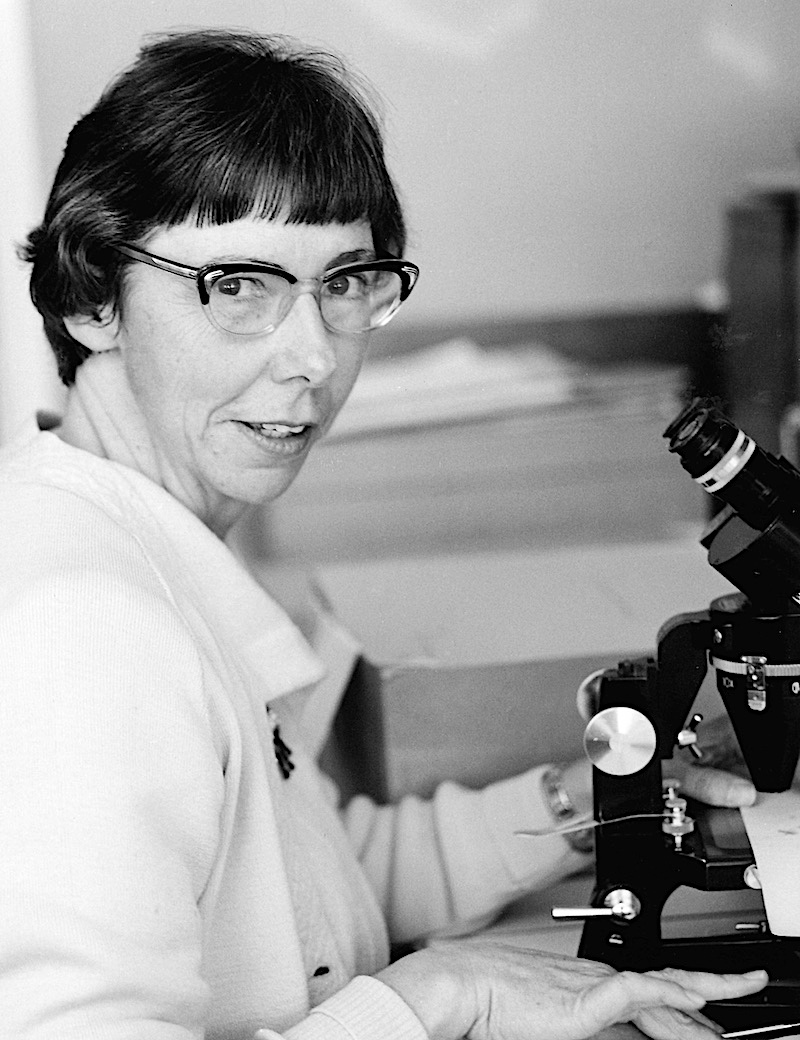
Elizabeth Edgar

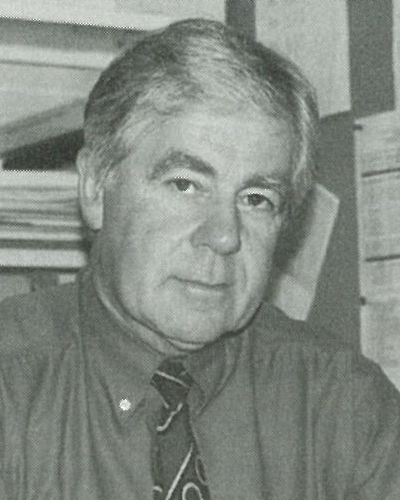
Ian Shirley

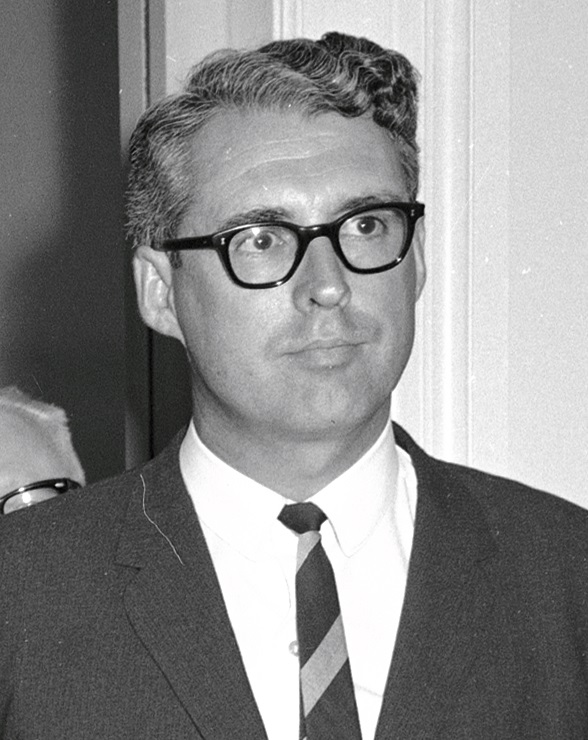
Sir John Jeffries

=== February ===
- 3 February – Peter Posa, Hall of Fame guitarist (born 1941).
- 6 February – John Cocks, builder and television personality (My House My Castle) (born 1966).
- 9 February
  - Judith McKinlay, biblical scholar (Knox College, University of Otago) (born 1937).
  - Neville Young, lawyer, National Party president (1986–1989), chair of the Earthquake Commission (1998–2006) (born 1940).
- 11 February – Allan Wild, architect and academic (University of Auckland), Fellow of the New Zealand Institute of Architects (since 1968) (born 1927).
- 12 February – George Grindley, geologist (New Zealand Geological Survey), Fellow of the Royal Society of New Zealand (since 1968) (born 1925).
- 14 February – Barrie Hutchinson, water polo player, British Empire Games silver medallist (1950), rugby union player (Wellington, Auckland) (born 1926).
- 18 February
  - George Cawkwell, classical scholar (University College, Oxford) and rugby union player (Scotland national team), Rhodes Scholar (1946) (born 1919).
  - Laura Solomon, novelist, playwright and poet, Bridport Prize (2004, 2005) (born 1974).
  - Peter Wells, writer and film-maker (Desperate Remedies), co-founder of the Auckland Writers Festival (born 1950).
- 23 February – Brian Halton, organic chemist (Victoria University of Wellington), president of the New Zealand Institute of Chemistry (1986–1987), Shorland Medal (2001), Fellow of the Royal Society of New Zealand (since 1992) (born 1941).
- 24 February – Ian Eliason, rugby union player (Taranaki, national team) (born 1945).
- 27 February – Bill Playle, cricketer (Auckland, national team, Western Australia) (born 1938).
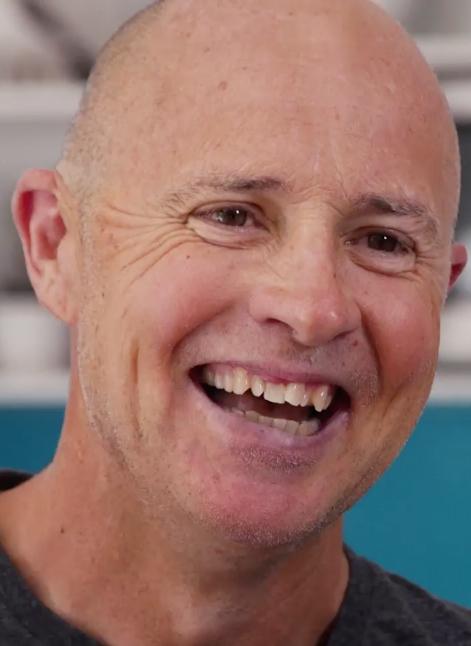
John Cocks

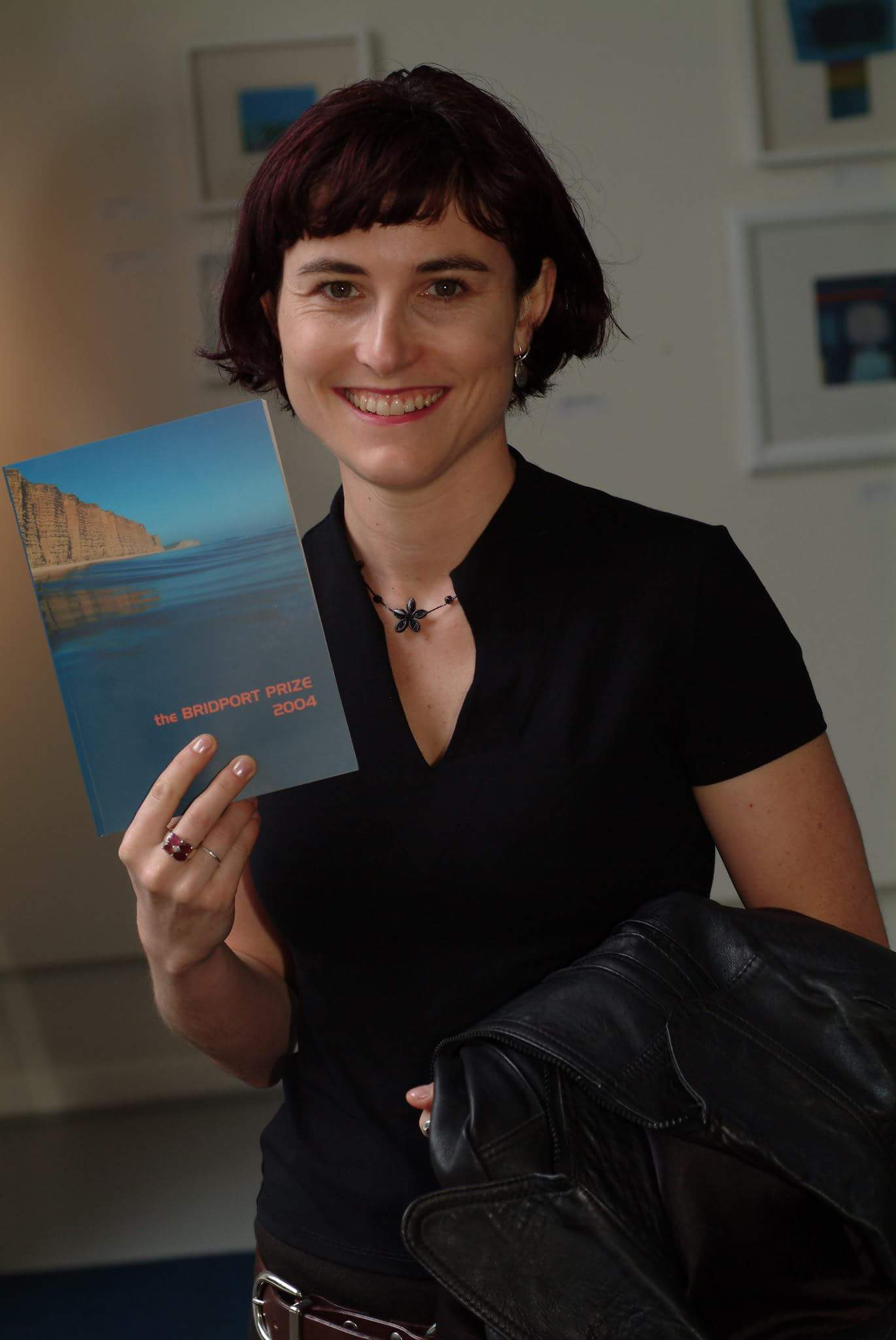
Laura Solomon

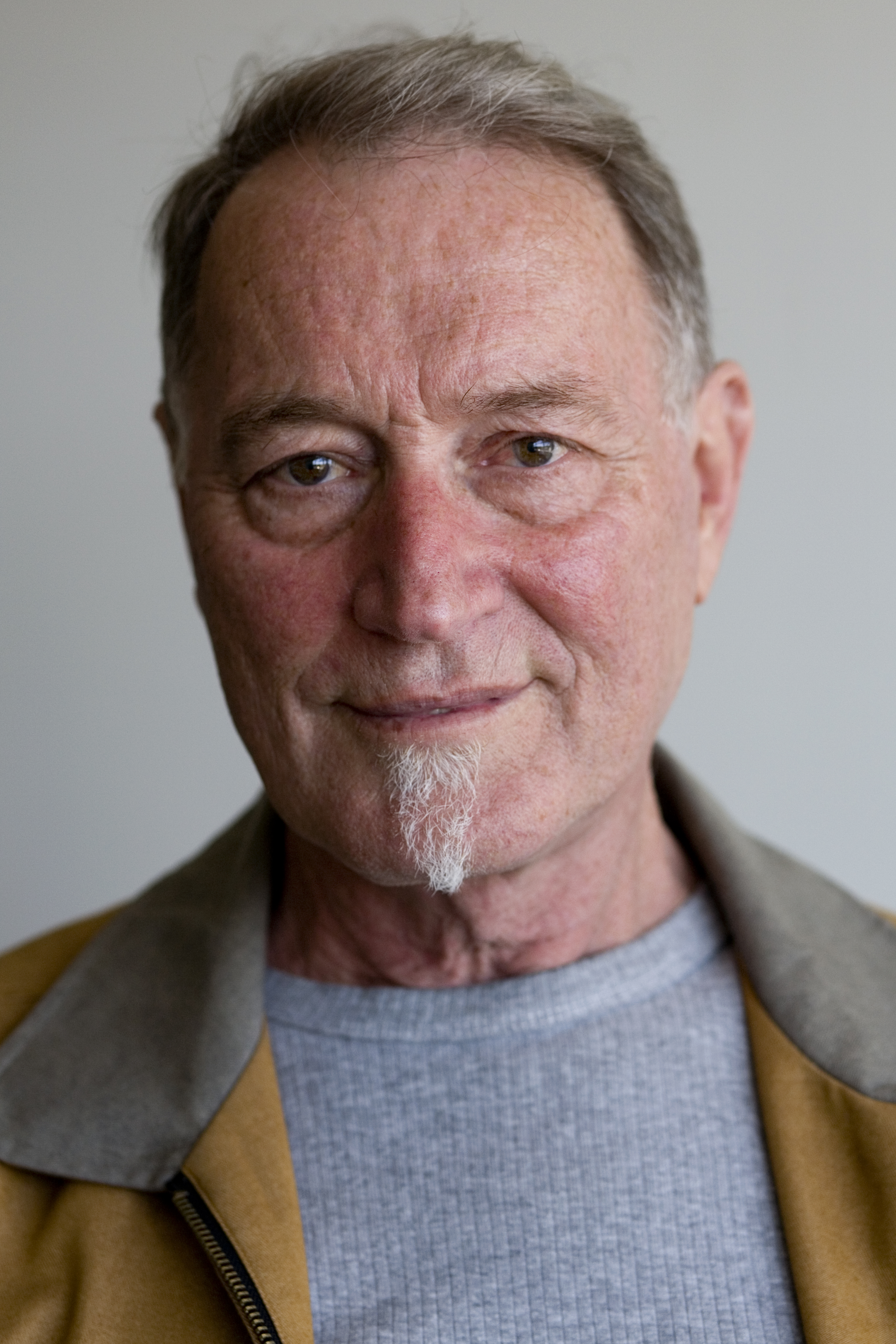
Peter Wells

=== March ===
- 1 March – Mike Tamoaieta, rugby union player (North Harbour, Blues) (born 1995).
- 2 March – Keith Davis, rugby union player (Auckland, New Zealand Māori, national team) (born 1930).
- 3 March – Leo de Castro, musician (born c. 1948).
- 5 March – David Kear, geologist (New Zealand Geological Survey) and science administrator, DSIR director-general (1980–1983), Fellow of the Royal Society of New Zealand (since 1973) (born 1923).
- 7 March – Ron Russell, Canadian politician (born 1926).
- 8 March – Ian Lawrence, local politician and Jewish community leader, Mayor of Wellington (1983–1986), Wellington Regional Councillor (1989–1995) (born 1937).
- 11 March – John Dawson, botanist (Victoria University of Wellington), New Zealand Post Book of the Year (2012) (born 1928).
- 14 March – Thomas Goddard, lawyer and jurist, chief judge of the Employment Court (1989–2005) (born 1937).
- 15 March – Atta Elayyan, futsal player (national team) (born 1985).
- 22 March – Denzil Meuli, writer, newspaper editor, lawyer and Catholic priest, editor of Zealandia (1969–1971) (born 1926).
- 24 March – Finn Lowery, water polo player (national team) and lawyer, Rhodes Scholar (2014) (born 1990).
- 28 March – Bill Culbert, artist (born 1935).
- 30 March – Ron Elvidge, rugby union player (Otago, national team), oldest living All Black (since 2016) (born 1923).
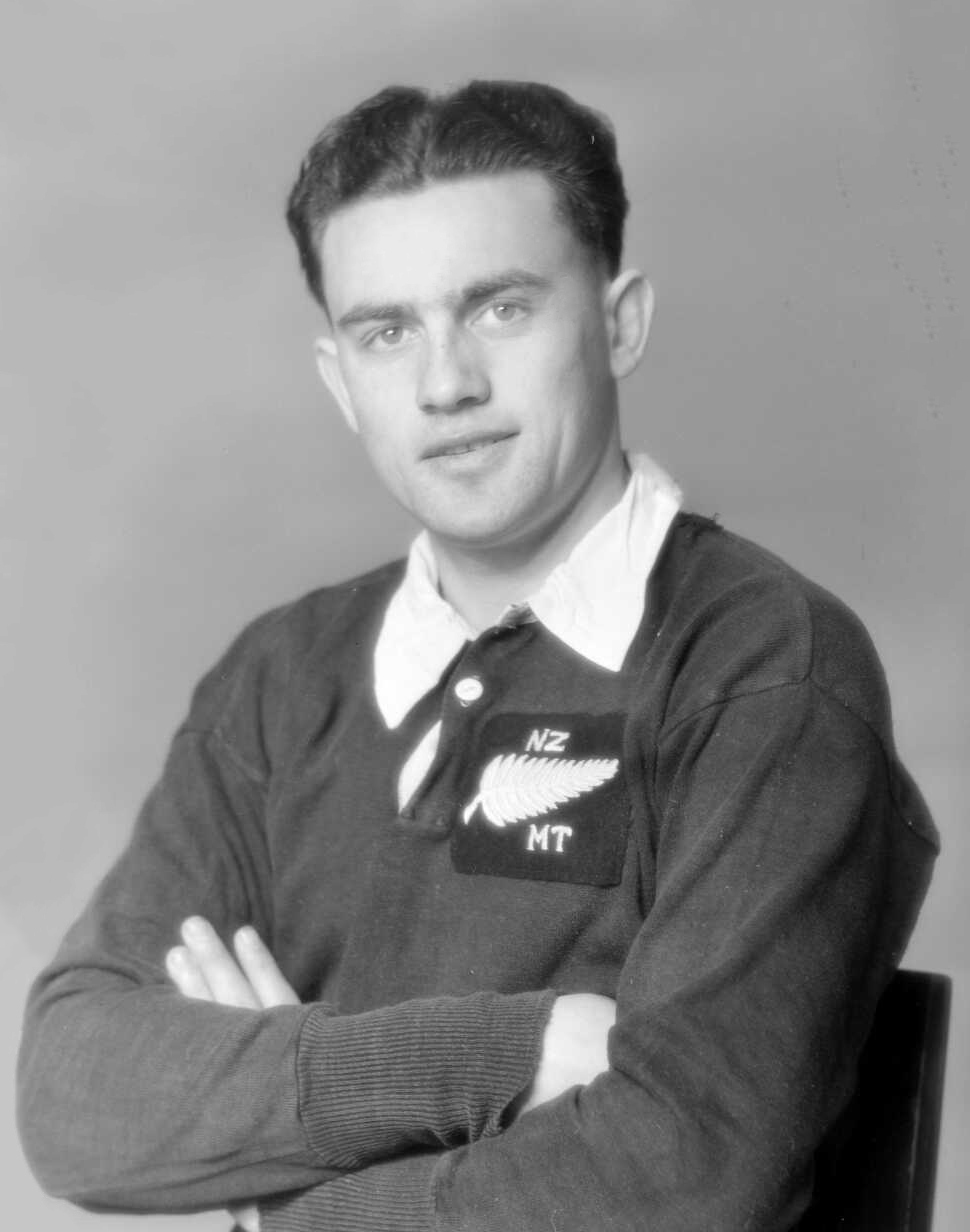
Keith Davis

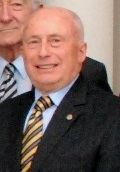
Ian Lawrence

=== April ===
- 2 April – George Salmond, public health administrator, Director-General of Health (1986–1991) (born 1937).
- 4 April – Ray Harper, rugby union player (Southland) and administrator, NZRFU councillor (1974–1987) (born 1927).
- 5 April – Trevor McKee, Thoroughbred racehorse trainer (Sunline) (born 1937).
- 8 April – Anzac Wallace, actor (Utu, The Quiet Earth, Mauri) (born 1945).
- 9 April – George McConnell, cricketer (Wellington) (born 1938).
- 13 April – Dame Yvette Corlett, Hall of Fame track and field athlete, Olympic long jump champion (1952), long jump world record holder (1954–1955), British Empire and Commonwealth Games long jump (1950, 1954), discus throw (1954) and shot put (1954) champion, New Zealand Sportsman of the Year (1950, 1952) (born 1929).
- 16 April – Len Hoogerbrug, architect (born 1929).
- 17 April – Peter Cartwright, lawyer and statesman, viceregal consort (2001–2006) (born 1940).
- 19 April – Philip Liner, radio broadcaster (National Radio) (born 1925).
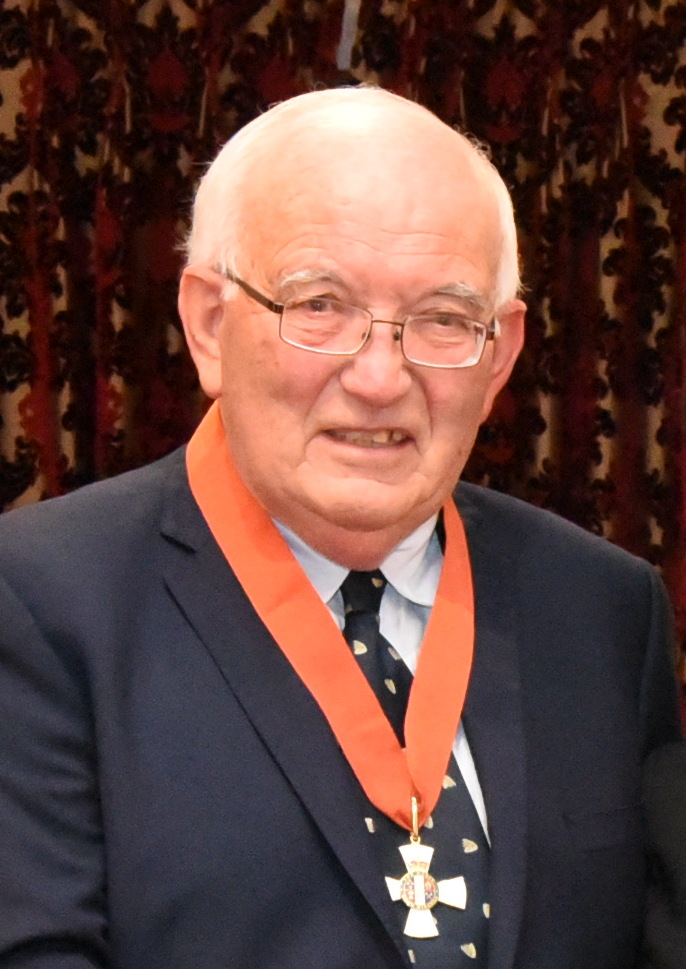
George Salmond

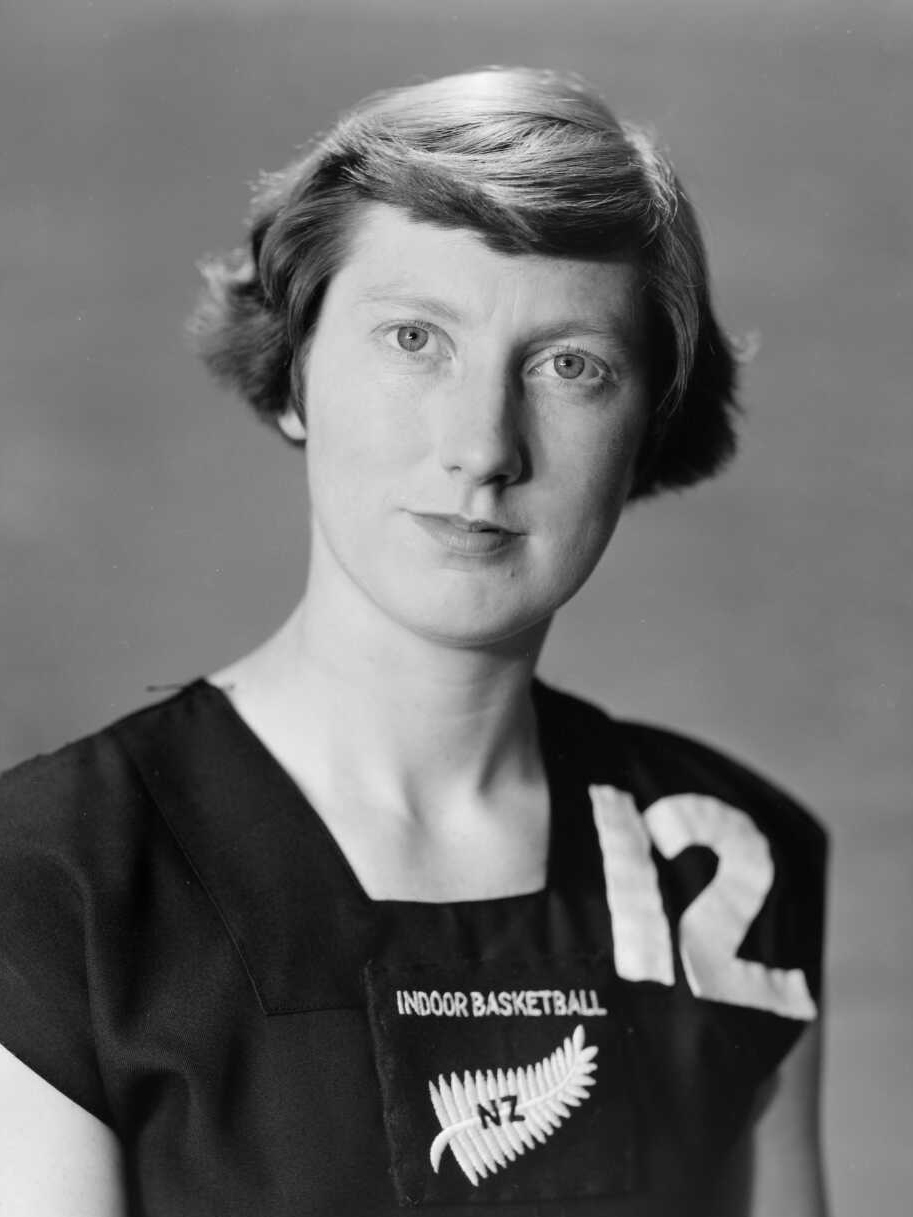
Dame Yvette Corlett

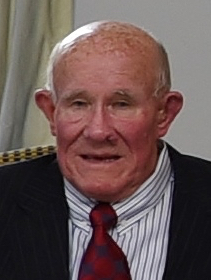
Peter Cartwright

=== May ===
- 2 May
  - Duncan MacRae, rugby league player (Auckland, national team) (born 1934).
  - Sister Pauline O'Regan, educator and writer, principal of Villa Maria College (1950–1966), principal of Mercy College (1967–1968) (born 1922).
- 7 May – Te Wharehuia Milroy, Māori language academic (University of Waikato) (born 1937).
- 8 May – Peter Webb, art dealer, gallery director and auctioneer (born 1933).
- 10 May
  - Carey Adamson, air force officer, Chief of the Air Staff (1995–1999), Chief of Defence Force (1999–2001) (born 1942).
  - Malcolm Black, musician (Netherworld Dancing Toys) and music lawyer, APRA Silver Scroll (1985) (born 1961).
- 11 May
  - Sir Hector Busby, Māori traditional navigator and waka builder (born 1932).
  - Pua Magasiva, actor (Shortland Street, Power Rangers Ninja Storm, Sione's Wedding) and radio host (Flava) (born 1980).
- 15 May – Roger Blackley, art historian (Auckland Art Gallery, Victoria University of Wellington) (born 1953).
- 18 May
  - Quentin Pongia, rugby league player (Canberra Raiders, Auckland Warriors, Wigan, national team) (born 1970).
  - Doug Wilson, rugby union player (Canterbury, Wellington, national team) (born 1931).
- 21 May – Colin Atkinson, cricketer (Central Districts) (born 1951).
- 24 May – Sharon McAuslan, lawyer and jurist, District Court judge (1995–2015) (born 1945).
- 26 May – Percy Erceg, rugby union player (North Auckland, Auckland, New Zealand Māori, national team), Tom French Cup (1951) (born 1928).
- 27 May – Guy Jansen, music educator (University of Queensland, Wheaton College Conservatory of Music), choral founder and director (New Zealand Youth Choir) (born 1935).
- 30 May – Jim Bell, association footballer (Northern, Onehunga, national team) (born 1935).
- 31 May – Sir Grant Hammond, lawyer, legal academic (University of Alberta, University of Auckland, University of Waikato) and jurist, High Court judge (1992–2004), Court of Appeal justice (2004–2011), president of the Law Commission (2010–2016) (born 1944).
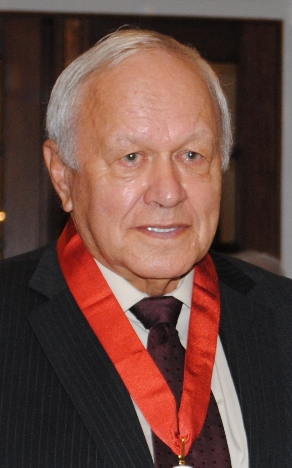
Te Wharehuia Milroy

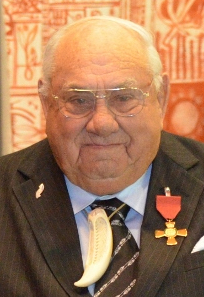
Sir Hec Busby

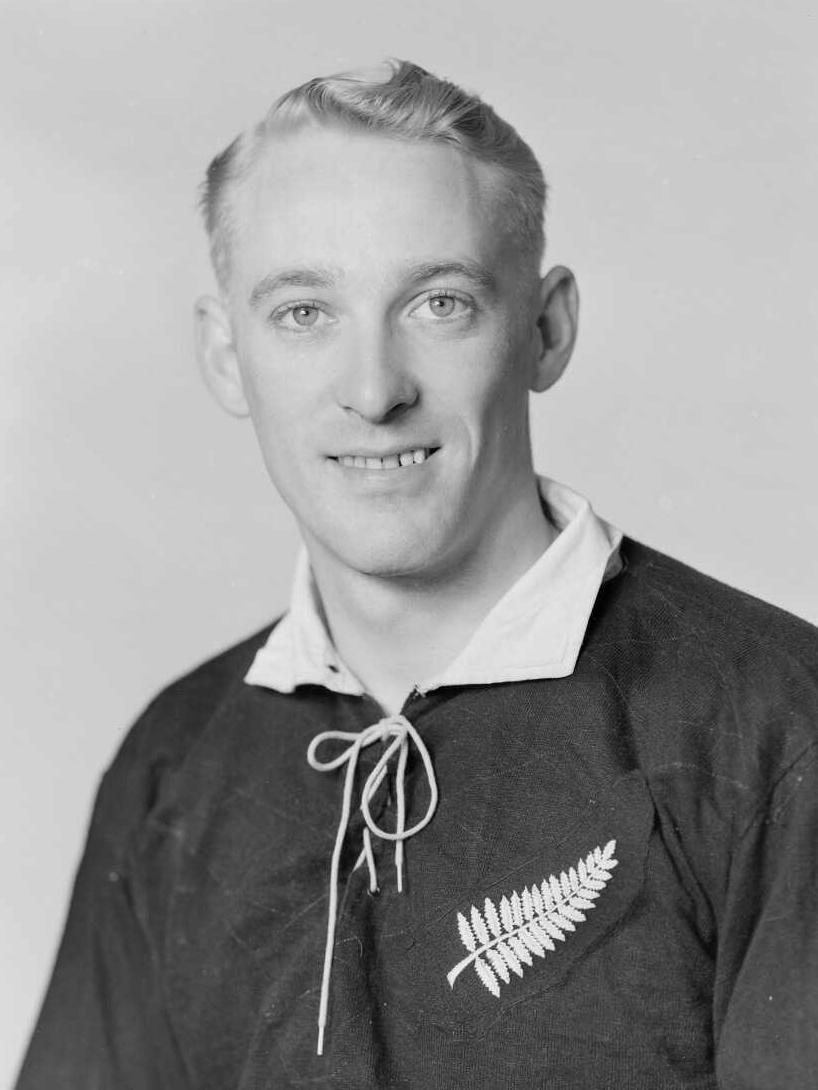
Doug Wilson

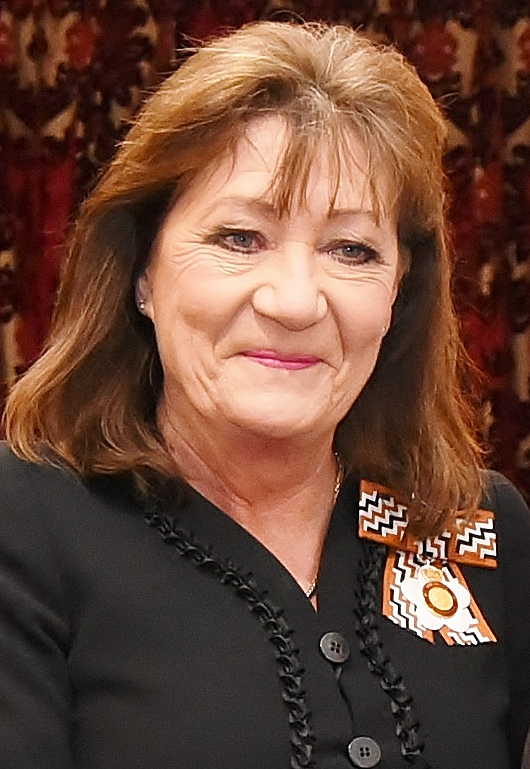
Sharon McAuslan

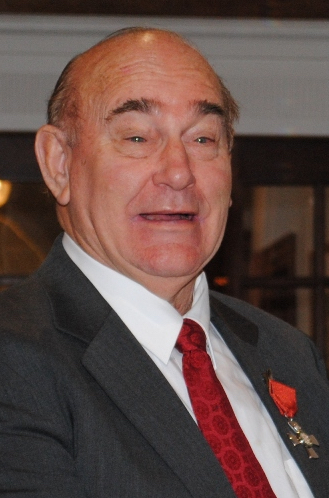
Guy Jansen

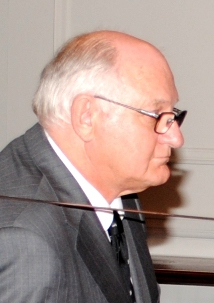
Sir Grant Hammond

=== June ===
- 2 June – Alistair Browning, actor (Merry Christmas, Mr. Lawrence, Rain, Futile Attraction), New Zealand Film Awards best supporting actor (2001) (born 1954).
- 13 June – Merilyn Wiseman, potter, Arts Foundation Laureate Award (2007) (born 1941).
- 14 June – Waana Davis, teacher, local politician and Māori arts leader, Palmerston North City Councillor (1984–1998), Toi Māori Aotearoa chair (1999–2019) (born 1938).
- 18 June
  - Shirlene Colcord, one of the Lawson quintuplets (born 1965).
  - Bill Deacon, rugby league player (Waikato, national team) (born 1944).
  - Shona Dunlop MacTavish, dancer (Bodenwieser Ballet), choreographer, and academic (Silliman University) (born 1920).
- 21 June – Geraldine Harcourt, Japanese–English translator (Requiem) (born 1952).
- 25 June – Arthur Candy, Olympic (1964) and British Empire and Commonwealth Games (1962) cyclist (born 1934).
- 30 June – Jim Gill, cricketer (Otago) (born 1928).
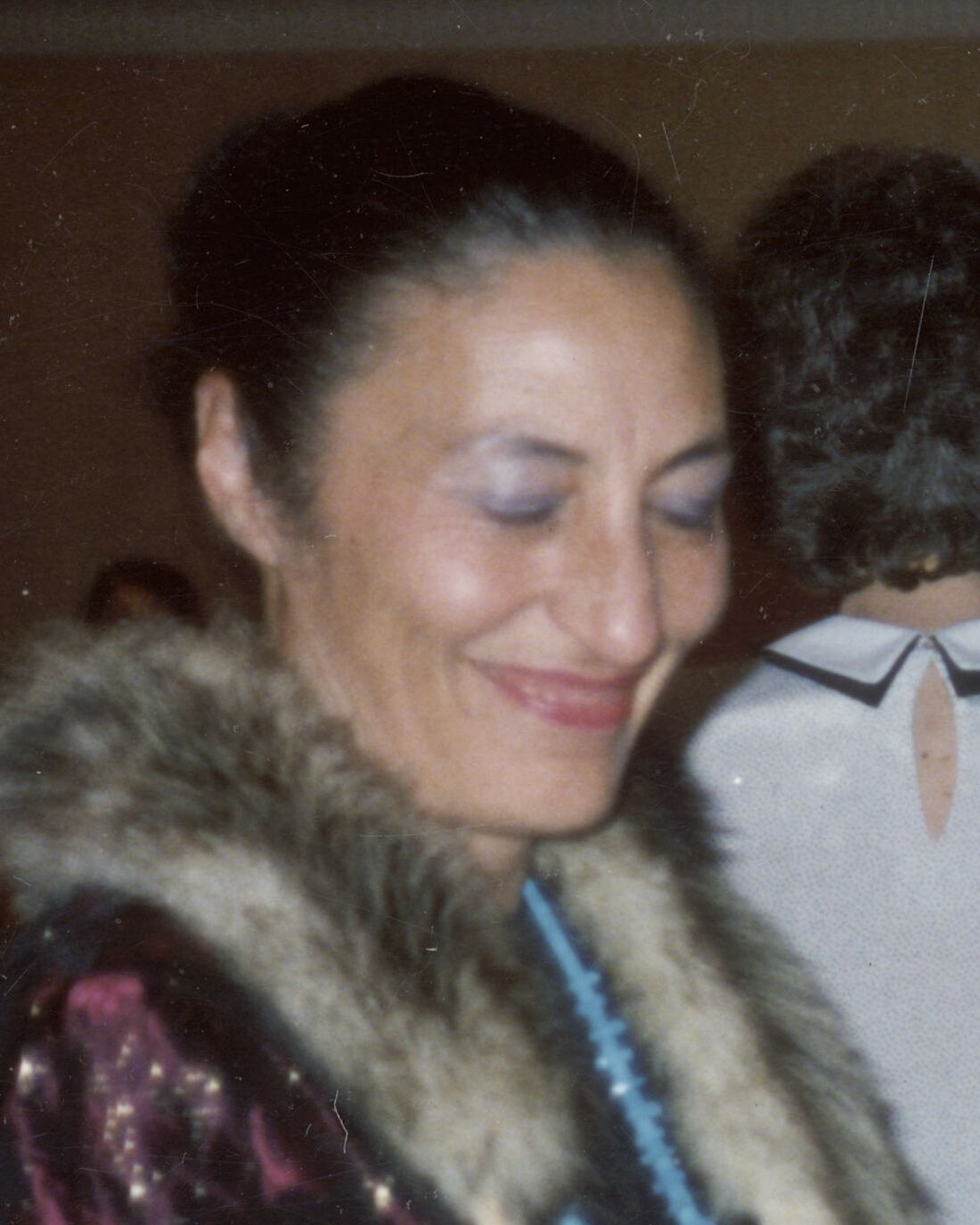
Waana Davis

=== July ===
- 1 July – Gerald Cunningham, writer, photographer and historian (born 1945).
- 4 July – Vernon McArley, cricketer (Otago) (born 1923).
- 6 July – Denis Pain, lawyer, judge, and sports administrator, District Court judge (1970–1990), Olympic eventing team manager (1988, 1992) (born 1936).
- 9 July – Heather Nicholson, educator, writer, and geologist, Montana Medal for non-fiction (1999) (born 1931).
- 12 July – Matthew Trundle, classics and ancient history academic (Victoria University of Wellington, University of Auckland) (born 1965).
- 15 July – Brian Coote, legal academic (University of Auckland), Fellow of the Royal Society of New Zealand (since 2009) (born 1929).
- 17 July – Warren Cole, Hall of Fame rower, Olympic champion (1968), world championship bronze medallist (1970) (born 1940).
- 19 July – Shirley Peterson, athlete, British Empire Games bronze medallist (1950) (born 1928).
- 20 July
  - Paddy Bassett, agricultural scientist, first female graduate from Massey University (1941) (born 1918).
  - Lance Pearson, cricketer (Otago) and basketball player (born 1937).
- 21 July – Peter Ramsay, educationalist (University of Waikato) and daffodil breeder, member of the Picot task force, Peter Barr Cup (2013) (born 1939).
- 23 July – Ruth Gotlieb, local-body politician, Wellington City Councillor (1983–2001) (born 1923).
- 29 July – John Wybrow, public servant, politician and diplomat, Labour Party general secretary (1971–1985), High Commissioner to Canada (1985–1988) (born 1928).
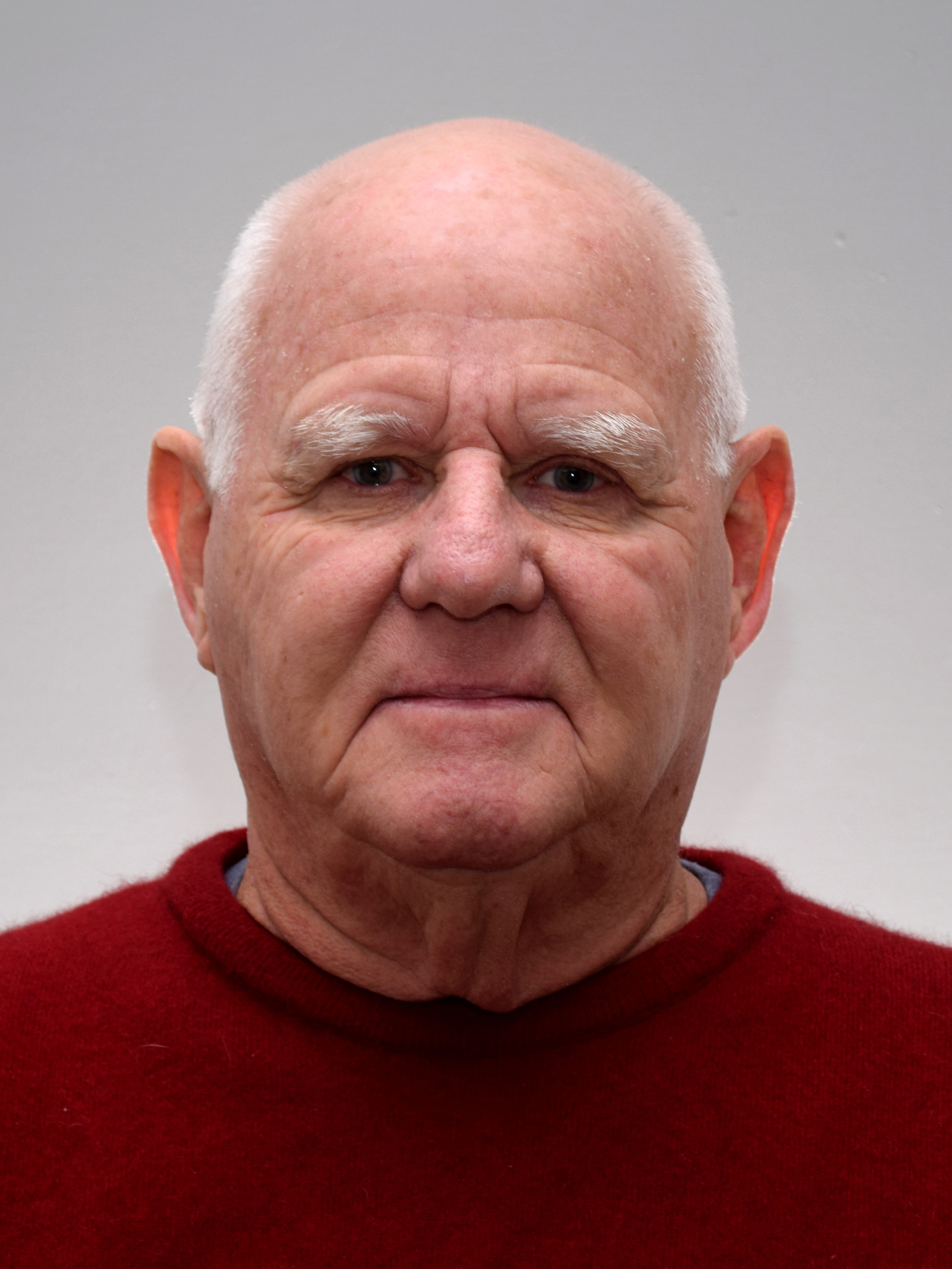
Gerald Cunningham

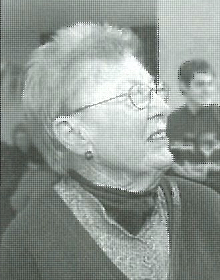
Paddy Bassett

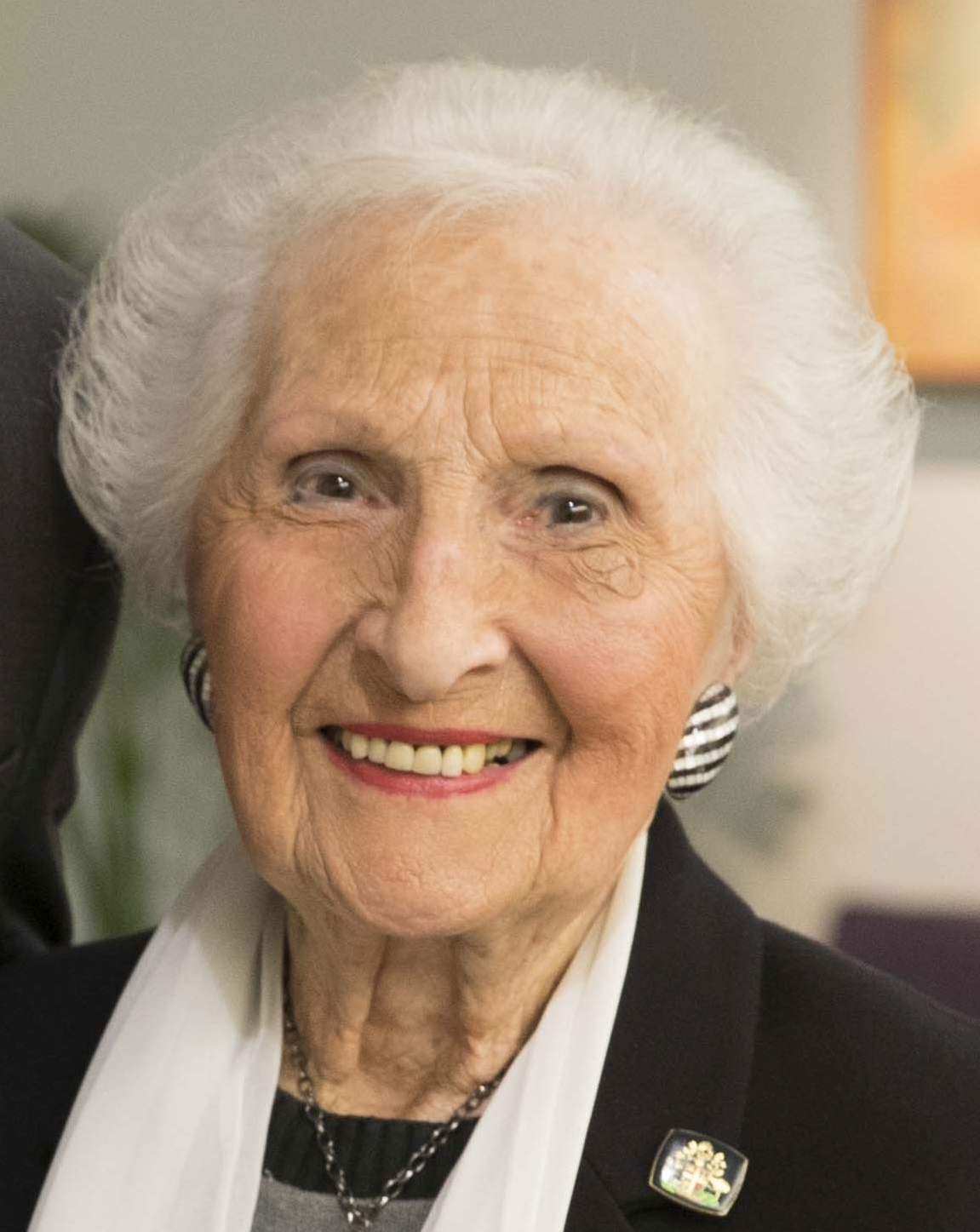
Ruth Gotlieb

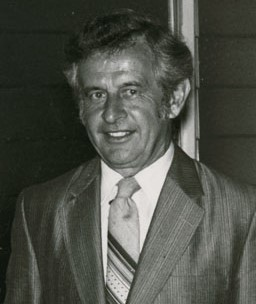
John Wybrow

=== August ===
- 1 August
  - Raymond Boyce, stage and costume designer, and puppeteer, Fellow of the New Zealand Academy of Fine Arts (since 1993), Arts Foundation of New Zealand Icon (since 2007) (born 1928).
  - Llew Summers, sculptor (born 1947).
- 2 August
  - Stuart O'Connell, Roman Catholic bishop, Bishop of Rarotonga (1996–2011) (born 1935).
  - Rob Storey, farmer and politician, Federated Farmers president (1981–1984), MP for Waikato (1984–1996), Minister of Transport (1990–1993) (born 1936).
  - Helen Young, radio manager (RNZ Concert) and arts advocate, New Zealand Radio Award for outstanding contribution to broadcasting (1990) (born 1926).
- 3 August – Sir Brian Lochore, Hall of Fame rugby union player and coach, Member of the Order of New Zealand (since 2007) (born 1940).
- 6 August – Rod Coleman, motorcycle road racer, Isle of Man Junior TT champion (1954) (born 1926).
- 8 August – Mazhar Krasniqi, Muslim community leader (born 1931).
- 11 August – Geoff Malcolm, physical chemist (University of Otago, Massey University), Fellow of the New Zealand Institute of Chemistry (since 1966) (born 1931).
- 15 August – Noel Pope, local-body politician, Mayor of Tauranga (1983–1989, 1995–2001) (born 1931).
- 16 August – Bruce Deans, rugby union player (Canterbury, national team) (born 1960).
- 19 August – John Hempleman, motorcycle racer, East German Grand Prix 250cc and 500cc champion (1960) (born 1933).
- 21 August – Lawrence Reade, cricketer (Central Districts) (born 1930).
- 23 August – Roaring Lion, Thoroughbred racehorse, Queen Elizabeth II Stakes (2018) (foaled 2015).
- 25 August
  - Sam McGredy, rose hybridiser ('Dublin Bay', 'Sexy Rexy', 'Aotearoa') (born 1932).
  - Ian Sinclair, cricketer (Canterbury, national team) (born 1933).
- 26 August
  - Felix Donnelly, Roman Catholic priest, social activist, academic (University of Auckland), writer, and talkback radio host (Radio Pacific), founder of Youthline (1970) (born 1929).
  - Ray Henwood, forensic toxicologist (DSIR) and actor (Gliding On), co-founder of Circa Theatre (1976) (born 1937).
  - Pita Paraone, public servant and politician, New Zealand First list MP (2002–2008, 2014–2017), Local Government Commission chair (since 2018) (born 1945).
- 27 August – Tahu Potiki, Māori leader (Ngāi Tahu), chief executive officer of Te Rūnanga o Ngāi Tahu (2002–2006) (born 1966).
- 29 August – Don Aickin, obstetrician and gynaecologist (University of Otago, Christchurch) (born 1934).
- 30 August – Ken France, association footballer (Christchurch Technical, Christchurch United, national team) (born 1941).
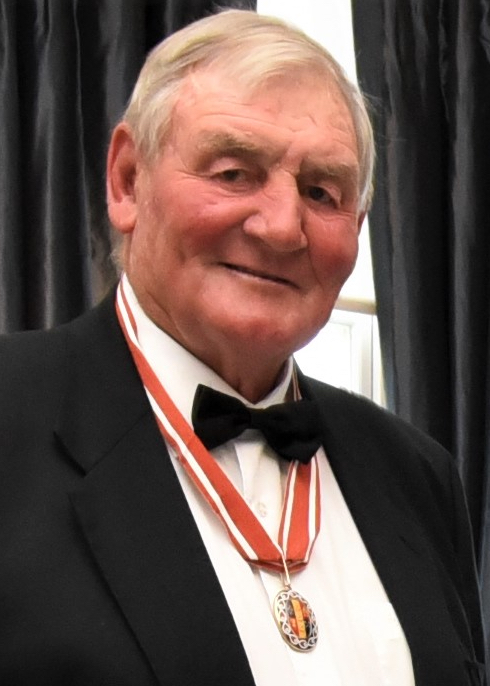
Sir Brian Lochore

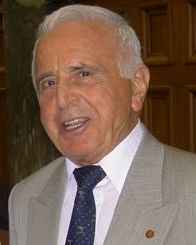
Mazhar Krasniqi

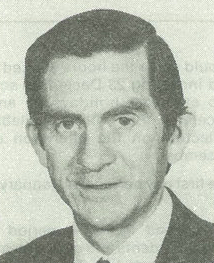
Geoff Malcolm

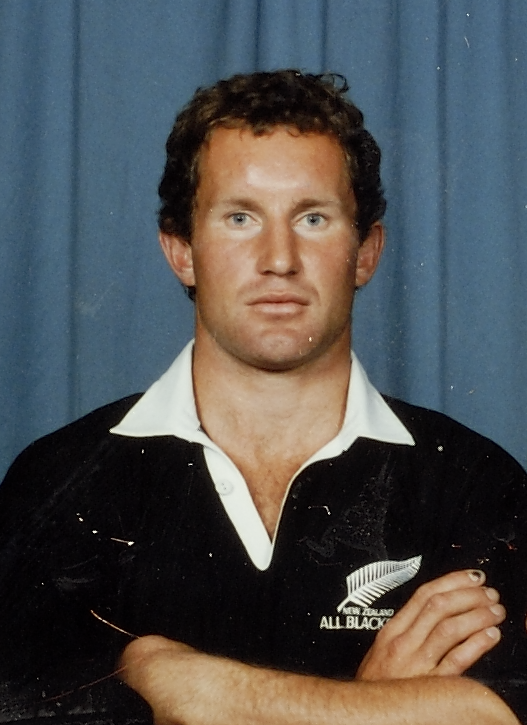
Bruce Deans

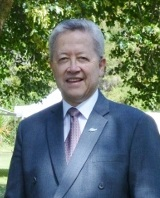
Pita Paraone

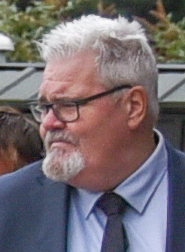
Tahu Potiki

=== September ===
- 2 September – Kevin Percy, Olympic field hockey player (1960) (born 1935).
- 4 September
  - Charles Broad, cricketer (Canterbury) and veterinarian (born 1945).
  - Peter Ellis, childcare worker wrongly convicted of child sexual abuse (born 1958).
- 7 September
  - Lawrie Creamer, protein chemist (Dairy Research Institute), Fellow of the Royal Society of New Zealand (since 1995) (born 1937).
  - Terry Horne, cricketer (Central Districts) and business executive (Sealord Group) (born 1953).
- 8 September – Ray Hitchcock, cricketer (Cantebury, Warwickshire) and racehorse breeder (born 1929).
- 9 September – Alister Taylor, publisher (born 1943).
- 12 September
  - Wade Doak, marine conservationist (born 1940).
  - ʻAkilisi Pōhiva, Tongan politician, Prime Minister of Tonga (since 2014) (born 1941).
- 18 September – Lady Anne Berry, horticulturalist (Rosemoor, Hackfalls Arboretum) (born 1919).
- 27 September – Jack Lasenby, children's writer and editor (New Zealand School Journal), Margaret Mahy Medal (2003), Prime Minister's Award for Literary Achievement (2014) (born 1931).
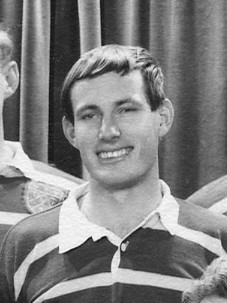
Charles Broad

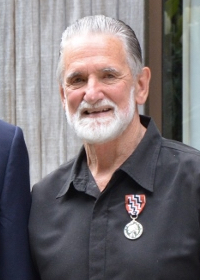
Wade Doak

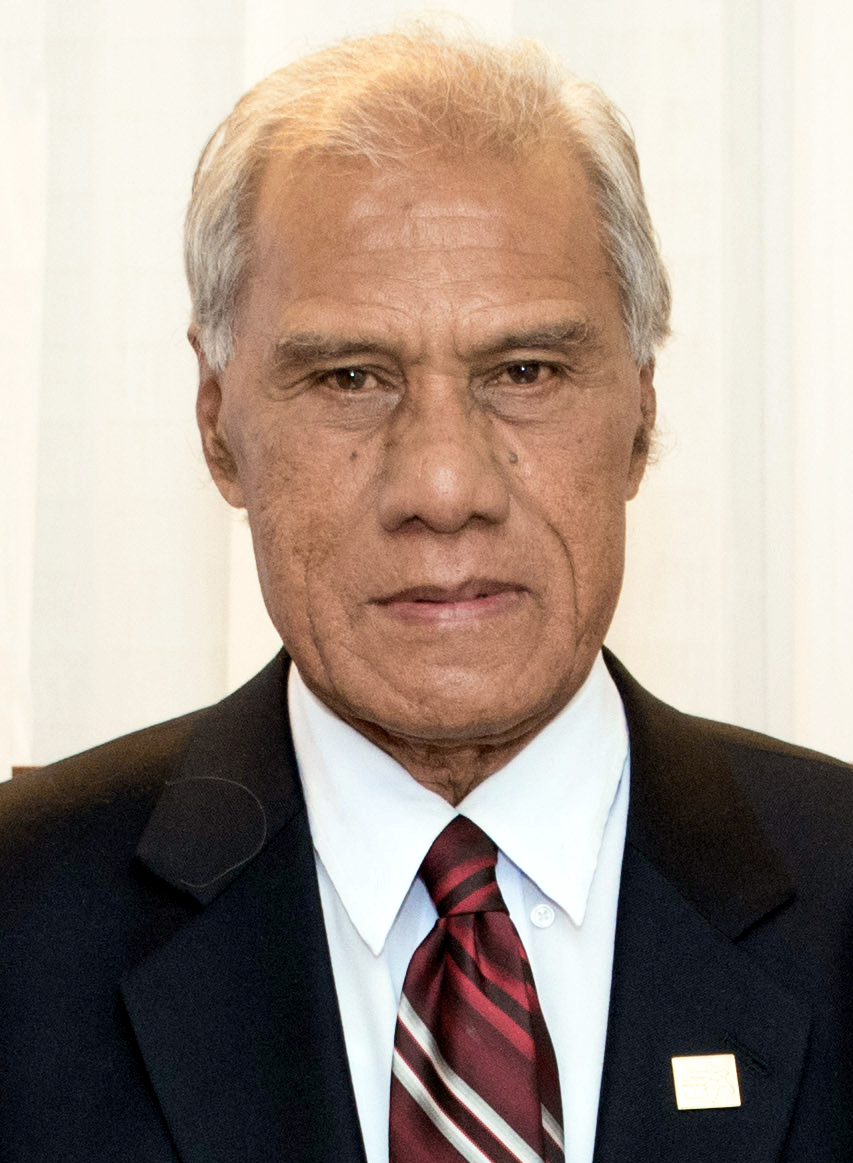
ʻAkilisi Pōhiva

=== October ===
- 2 October – Tiny Hill, rugby union player (Canterbury, Counties, national team) and official, All Blacks selector (1981–1986) (born 1927).
- 7 October
  - Harvey Benge, photographer (born 1944).
  - Arnold Heine, Antarctic scientist (DSIR), tramper and conservationist (born 1926).
- 10 October – Marie Darby, marine biologist (Otago Museum), first New Zealand woman to visit mainland Antarctica (born 1940).
- 11 October – Heather Robson, badminton player (national team) and administrator, tennis player and administrator, Oceania Badminton Confederation president (1987–2000), Badminton World Federation lifetime achievement award (2013) (born 1928).
- 14 October – Desmond Park, cricketer (Central Districts) (born 1936).
- 17 October – Rom Harré, philosopher (University of Oxford, Georgetown University), founder of ethogenics (born 1927).
- Between 16 and 22 October – Mike McClennan, rugby league player (Auckland, national team) and coach (St Helens, Tonga national team) (born 1944).
- 22 October – Bill Thomson, Olympic field hockey squad member (1968), and cricketer (Canterbury) (born 1943).
- 28 October – Ken McCracken, rugby league player (Auckland, national team) (born 1941).
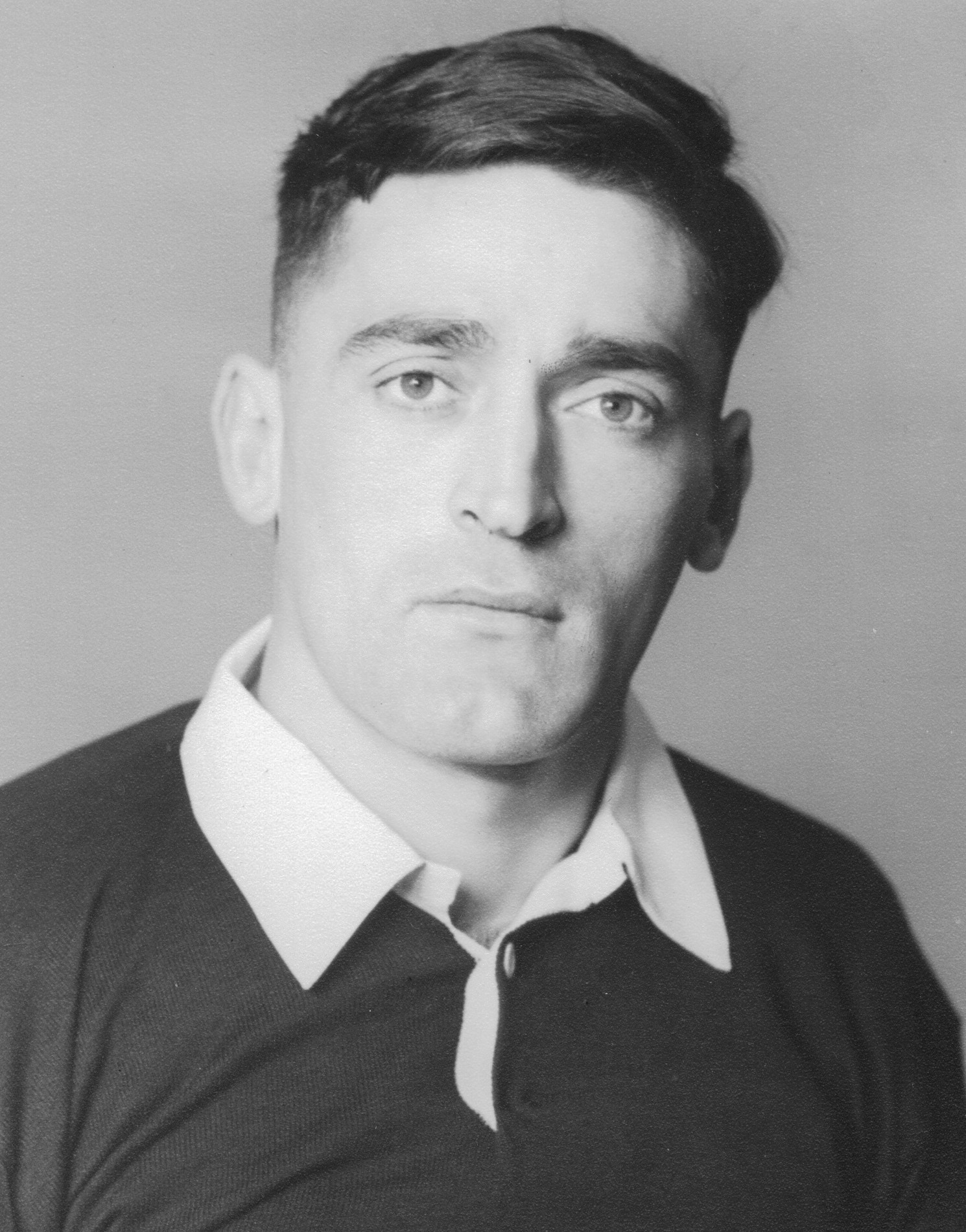
Tiny Hill

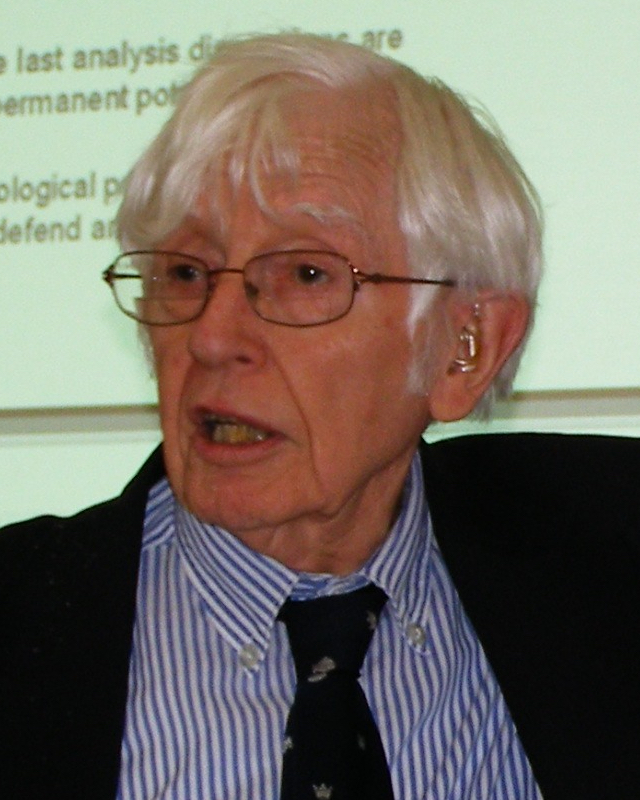
Rom Harré

=== November ===
- 2 November – Ian Cross, writer (The God Boy), journalist (The Dominion, New Zealand Listener) and broadcasting executive, Broadcasting Corporation of New Zealand chair (1977–1984) and chief executive (1984–1986) (born 1925).
- 5 November – Ed Dolejs, Hall of Fame softball coach (women's national team) (born 1929).
- 9 November – Les Downes, cricketer (Central Districts) (born 1945).
- 16 November
  - Nancy Brunning, actress (Shortland Street, What Becomes of the Broken Hearted?, Mahana), director and playwright (born 1971).
  - Drago Došen, artist (born 1943).
- 18 November
  - Ryan Costello, baseball player (Arizona League Mariners, Fort Myers Miracle, Pensacola Blue Wahoos) (born 1996).
  - Sandra Easterbrook, Hall of Fame netball player (national team), world champion (1967) (born 1946).
- 20 November – Alastair Smith, information science academic Victoria University of Wellington and cycling advocate (born 1948).
- 21 November – Wally Clark, zoologist (Massey University, University of Canterbury) (born 1927).
- 25 November – Bevin Hough, rugby league player (Auckland, national team) and long jumper, British Empire Games silver medallist (1950) (born 1929).
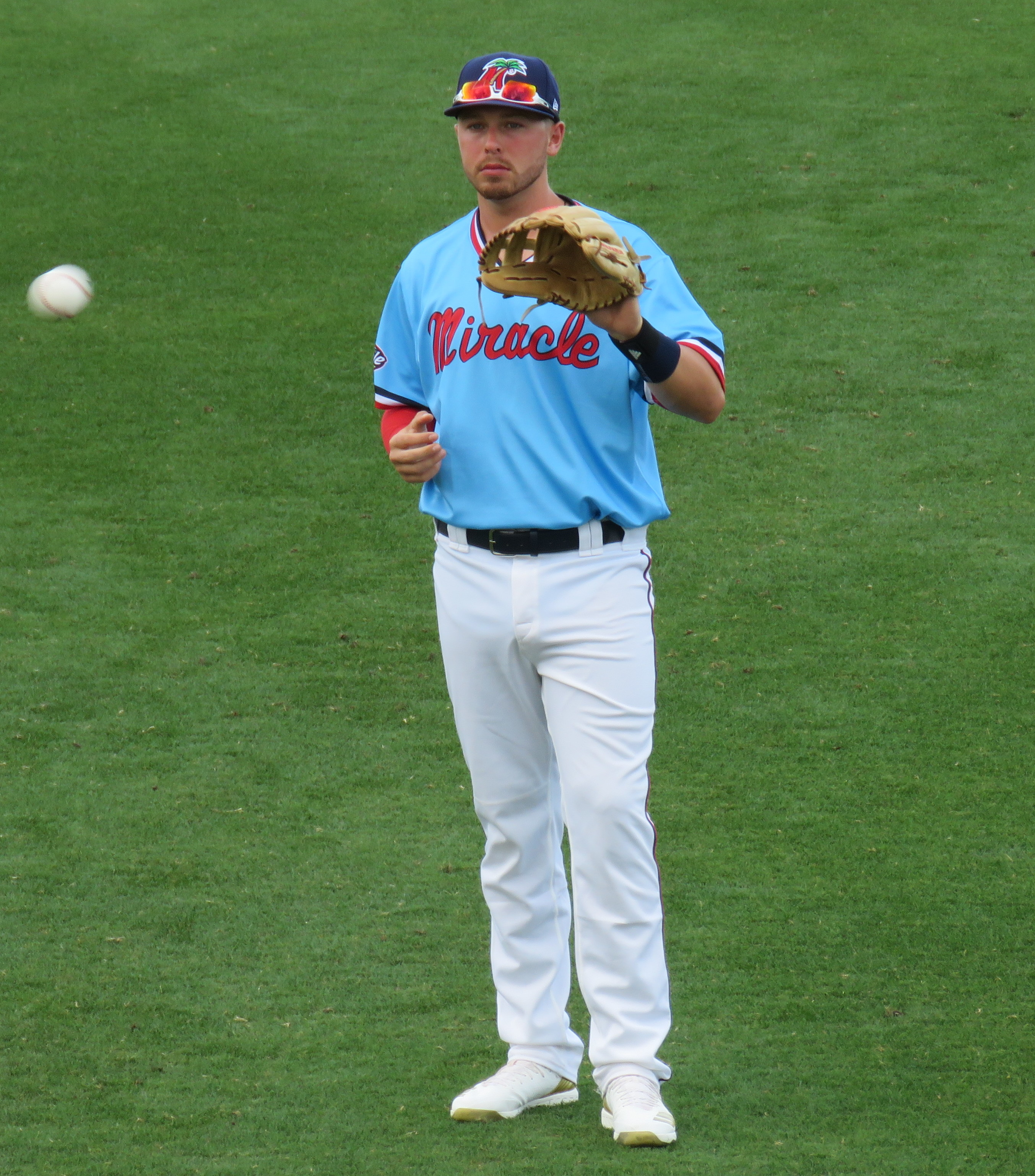
Ryan Costello

=== December ===
- 1 December – Sacred Falls, Thoroughbred racehorse, New Zealand 2000 Guineas (2012), Doncaster Handicap (2013, 2014), George Main Stakes (2014) (foaled 2009).
- 3 December – Arthur Baysting, journalist (New Zealand Listener), scriptwriter (Sleeping Dogs, The Mad Dog Gang Meets Rotten Fred and Ratsguts), songwriter and New Zealand music advocate (born 1947).
- 5 December – Rick Bryant, musician (Rick Bryant and the Jive Bombers, The Windy City Strugglers, Blerta) (born 1948).
- 6 December – Jules Mikus, convicted murderer (born 1958).
- 8 December
  - Joe Moodabe, cinema-chain manager (born 1937).
  - Tessa Temata, lawyer and diplomat, High Commissioner to the Cook Islands (since February 2019) (born c. 1967).
- 12 December
  - Norman Kingsbury, educational administrator, University of Waikato registrar (1964–1988), New Zealand Qualifications Authority chief executive officer (1990–2000) (born 1932).
  - Brian Muller, rugby union player (Taranaki, national team) (born 1942).
  - Sir Peter Snell, Hall of Fame athlete, triple Olympic champion (1960, 1964) and double British Commonwealth Games champion (1962), Track & Field News Athlete of the Year (1962, 1964), Lonsdale Cup (1962, 1964), New Zealand Sportsman of the Year (1960, 1964), New Zealand Sports Champion of the Century (2000) (born 1938).
- 21 December
  - Peter Bartlett, architect and academic (University of Auckland), Fellow of the New Zealand Institute of Architects (since 1976), Fellow of the Royal Society of Arts (since 1977) (born 1929).
  - Sam Strahan, rugby union player (Manawatu, national team) and administrator, president of the Manawatu Rugby Union (2003–2006) (born 1944).
- 22 December
  - Bill Lambert, politician, MP for Western Hutt (1975–1978) (born 1930).
  - Campbell Thomas, theatre director (Fortune Theatre) (born 1935).
- 29 December – Ken Strongman, psychology academic (University of Canterbury), book and television reviewer (The Press), Fellow of the Royal Society of New Zealand (since 1994) (born 1940).
- 31 December – Diana Martin, microbiologist (Institute of Environmental Science and Research), Fellow of the Royal Society of New Zealand (since 2000) (born 1942).
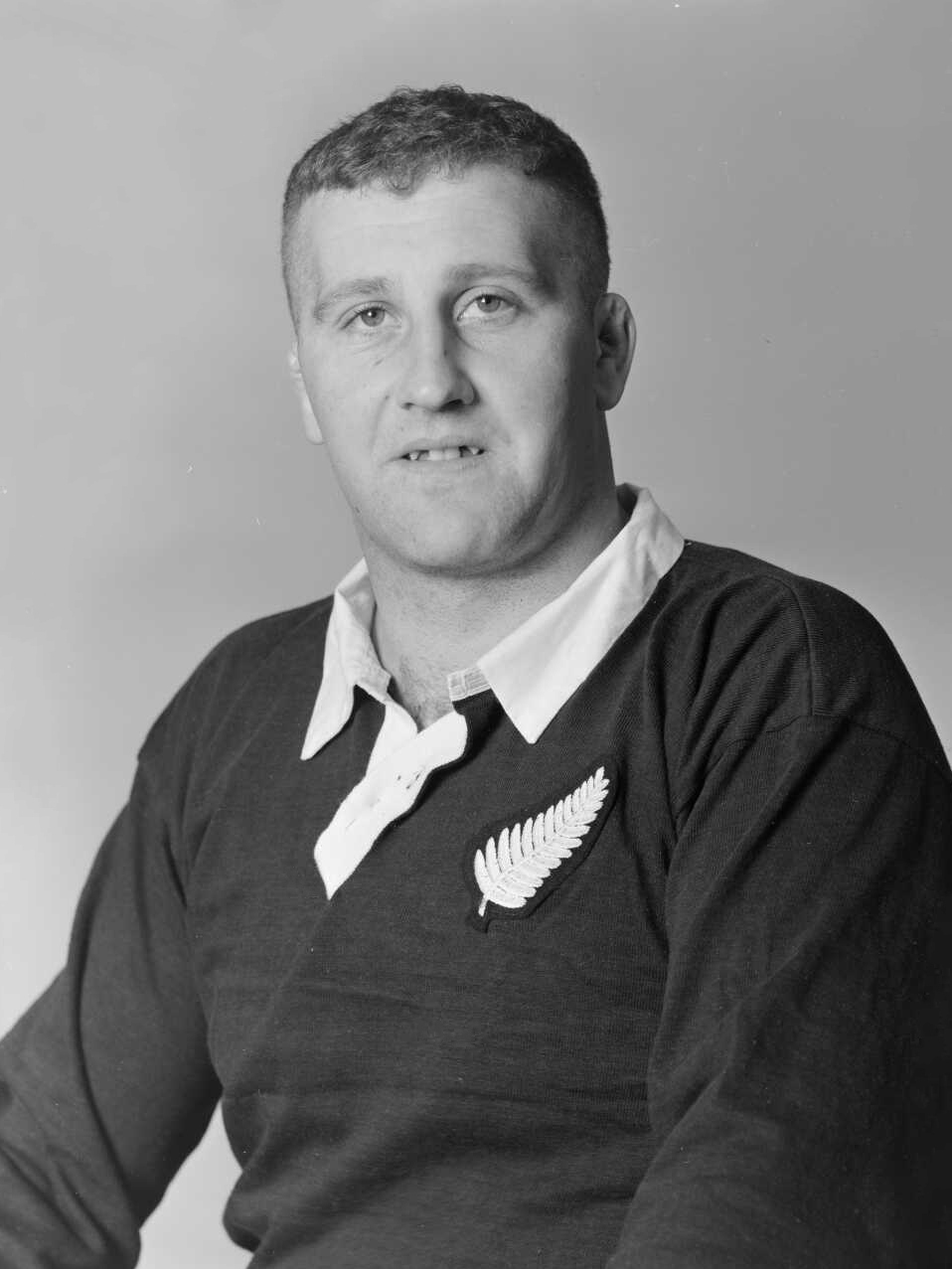
Brian Muller

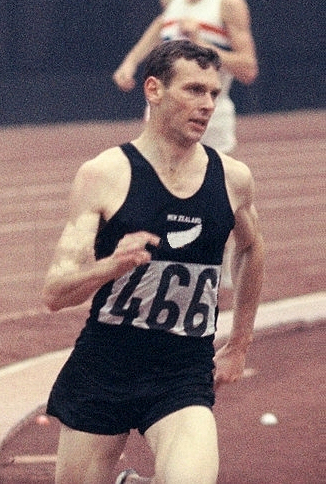
Sir Peter Snell

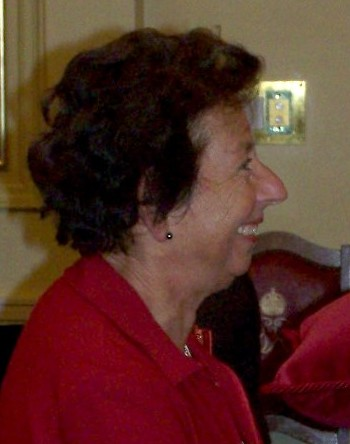
Diana Martin
