= Alastair Smith =

New Zealand academic (1948–2019)

Alastair Gibson Smith (1948 – 20 November 2019) was a New Zealand academic in the field of library and information science. He retired in 2014 after spending most of his career at Victoria University of Wellington.

== Biography ==
Smith obtained a BSc in physics from the University of Auckland, a Diploma in Teaching from Christchurch Teachers' College, a diploma from the New Zealand Library School and an MA from Victoria University of Wellington. He worked at the National Library of New Zealand, BRANZ and Victoria University of Wellington, where he rose to Senior Lecturer. He was appointed the inaugural general secretary of the Bicycle Association of New Zealand in 1979. He was diagnosed with multiple myeloma, a type of cancer, in 2001.

Smith died in Wellington Hospital on 20 November 2019.

== Publications ==
=== Academic ===
Smith served on the editorial boards of Cybermetrics, the Journal of Web Librarianship, and Information Science Research and authored the following significant publications (greater than 100 citations according to Google Scholar):

- Smith, Alastair G. (1997) Testing the Surf: Criteria for Evaluating Internet Information Resources. The Public-Access Computer Systems Review 8, no. 3 http://info.lib.uh.edu/pr/v8/n3/smit8n3.html
- Smith, Alastair G. (1999) A tale of two web spaces: comparing sites using web impact factors. Journal of Documentation 55 (5):577-592
- Smith, Alastair G. (2001). Applying evaluation criteria to New Zealand government websites. International Journal of Information Management 21(2): 137–149.
- Smith, Alastair; Thelwall, Mike (2002) Web Impact Factors for Australasian Universities. Scientometrics 54(1/2): 363–380.
- Elgort, I., Smith, A. G., & Toland, J. (2008). Is wiki an effective platform for group course work? Australasian Journal of Educational Technology, 24(2), 195–210. https://web.archive.org/web/20140416051146/http://www.ascilite.org.au/ajet/ajet24/ajet24.html

=== Non-academic ===
- Everyday Cycling in New Zealand Awa Press 2012. ISBN 9781877551017
