= Athletics at the 1950 British Empire Games – Men's long jump =

Men's long jump at the Commonwealth Games

The men's long jump event at the 1950 British Empire Games was held on 7 February at the Eden Park in Auckland, New Zealand.

== Results ==
Rank	Name	Nationality	Result	Notes
1st place, gold medalist(s)	Neville Price	South Africa	24 ft 0 in (7.32 m)	
2nd place, silver medalist(s)	Bevin Hough	New Zealand	23 ft 7 3/8 in (7.20 m)	
3rd place, bronze medalist(s)	Dave Dephoff	New Zealand	23 ft 3 in (7.09 m)	
4	Keith Forsythe	New Zealand	23 ft 3 in (7.09 m)	
5	Harold Whittle	England	22 ft 8 1/8 in (6.91 m)	
6	Karim Olowu	Nigeria	22 ft 8 1/8 in (6.91 m)	
7	Mohamed Sheriff	Ceylon	21 ft 6 in (6.55 m)	
