= Athletics at the 1954 British Empire and Commonwealth Games – Women's discus throw =

Women's discus throw at the Commonwealth Games
- Venue: Empire Stadium
- Dates: 7 August

The women's discus throw event at the 1954 British Empire and Commonwealth Games was held on 7 August at the Empire Stadium in Vancouver, Canada. It was the first time that women contested this event at the Games.

== Results ==
Rank	Name	Nationality	Result	Notes
1st place, gold medalist(s)	Yvette Williams	New Zealand	147 ft 8 in (45.01 m)	GR
2nd place, silver medalist(s)	Suzanne Allday	England	131 ft 3 1/2 in (40.02 m)	
3rd place, bronze medalist(s)	Marie Dupree	Canada	126 ft 10 in (38.66 m)	
4	Helen Metchuck	Canada	119 ft 10 in (36.53 m)	
5	Valerie Lawrence	Australia	104 ft 6 in (31.85 m)	
6	Shirley Couzens	Canada	91 ft 10 1/4 in (28.00 m)	
