= Rick Bryant =

New Zealand singer-songwriter (1948–2019)

Donald Richard Bryant (1948 – 5 December 2019), generally known as Rick Bryant, was a New Zealand blues and rock singer/songwriter.

Bands include Rick Bryant and the Jive Bombers, The Jubilation Gospel Choir, and Windy City Strugglers. With over a fifty-year history in music other bands include Mammal and Bruno Lawrence's Blerta.

He was convicted of possession of cannabis, cannabis oil, ecstasy and cocaine, but appealed his sentence in 2011, blaming his 35-year history of cannabis use.

Bryant died in Auckland on 5 December 2019.
