= The Public-Access Computer Systems Review =

The Public-Access Computer Systems Review (PACS Review) was an open access journal about end-user computer systems in libraries. Established in 1989, the journal ceased operation in 2000.

During its nine years of publication, PACS Review published 42 issues that included 112 articles, columns, reviews, and editorials. The PACS Review was indexed in Current Index to Journals in Education, Information Science Abstracts, and Library Literature.

PACS Review is archived on the Internet Archive and the Texas Digital Library.

== History ==
PACS Review was the first open access journal in the field of library and information science. It was established in 1989 by Charles W. Bailey, Jr., who served as Editor-in-Chief from 1989 through 1996. PACS Review was published by the University of Houston Libraries.

PACS Review was announced on the PACS-L discussion list on August 16, 1989. A call for papers was issued on October 16, 1989. The publication of the first issue was announced on January 3, 1990. The journal was cataloged on OCLC and assigned an ISSN number by the Library of Congress National Serials Data Program on February 1, 1990. Initially, PACS Review published scholarly papers (Communications section), columns, and reviews. Papers in the Communications section were selected by the Editor-in-Chief and the Associate Editor, Communications. A private mailing list was utilized for communication with editorial staff and editorial board members. Most communication with authors was done via e-mail, including paper submission.

PACS Review was published three times a year. New issue announcements were distributed as e-mail messages on the PACS-L discussion list, and users retrieved the ASCII article files from the University of Houston's LISTSERV via e-mail. Authors retained the copyright to PACS Review articles, but gave the University of Houston the nonexclusive right to publish the articles in PACS Review and in future publications. Authors could republish their articles elsewhere, but they agreed to mention prior publication of the articles in the PACS Review within these works. Copying of PACS Review articles was permitted for educational, noncommercial use by academic computer centers, individual scholars, and libraries. On October 29, 1991, PACS Review adopted a more flexible publication schedule that reduced article publication time.

A Refereed Articles section of PACS Review was announced on November 11, 1991, and a call for papers was issued on February 6, 1992. The Refereed Articles section included papers that were peer-reviewed by editorial board members using a double-blind review procedure, which was usually conducted via e-mail. The publication of the first refereed paper in PACS Review was announced on April 6, 1992.

Between 1992 and 1996, the first five volumes of PACS Review were published in book form by the Library and Information Technology Association (LITA). Walt Crawford prepared the camera-ready copy for these volumes and Bailey provided editorial support. Starting on April 6, 1992, PACS Review issue publication announcements were also distributed on the PACS-P list. On January 29, 1994, the distribution of PACS Review via the University of Houston Libraries' Gopher server was announced. (Gopher distribution was suspended in 1998.) PACS Review ceased publishing reviews in 1994. On March 9, 1995, the distribution of PACS Review via University of Houston Libraries' Web server was announced.

Starting with the first issue of volume six (March 21, 1995), the PACS Review

- published articles in both ASCII and HTML formats
- offered HTML articles with both internal and external links
- gave authors the option of updating the HTML version of their articles.

The first updated article was "Network-Based Electronic Publishing of Scholarly Works: A Selective Bibliography" by Charles W. Bailey, Jr., which was updated 25 times.

At the end of 1996, Bailey stepped down as Editor-in-Chief. Pat Ensor and Thomas C. Wilson became Editors-in-Chief in January 1997. They edited volumes eight (1997) and nine (1998).

Publication of the last PACS Review issue was announced on June 18, 1998. Papers were under consideration for publication until August 2000, when the journal ceased operation.

== Editorial Staff ==
=== Editors-in-Chief ===
- Charles W. Bailey, Jr., 1989–1996
- Pat Ensor, 1997–2000
- Thomas C. Wilson, 1997–2000

=== Associate and Copy Editors ===
- Leslie Dillon, associate editor (1990) and associate editor, columns (1991–1997)
- Elizabeth A. Dupuis, associate editor, columns (1997–2000)
- John E. Fadell, copy editor (1998–2000)
- Andrea Bean Hough, associate editor, communications (1997–2000)
- Mike Ridley, associate editor (1989–1990) and associate editor, reviews (1991)
- Dana Rooks, associate editor, communications (1991–1997)
- Robert Spragg, associate editor, technical support (1996–2000)
- Roy Tennant, associate editor, reviews (1992–1993)
- Ann Thornton, associate editor, production (1995–2000)

=== Editorial board members ===
- Ralph Alberico (1992–2000)
- George H. Brett II (1992–2000)
- Priscilla Caplan (1994–2000)
- Steve Cisler (1992–2000)
- Walt Crawford (1989–2000)
- Lorcan Dempsey (1992–2000)
- Pat Ensor (1994–1996)
- Nancy Evans (1989–2000)
- Stephen Harter (1997–2000)
- Charles Hildreth (1992–2000)
- Ronald Larsen (1992–2000)
- Clifford Lynch (1992–2000)
- David R. McDonald (1989–2000)
- R. Bruce Miller (1989–2000)
- Ann Okerson (1997–2000)
- Paul Evan Peters (1989–1996)
- Mike Ridley (1992–2000)
- Peggy Seiden (1995–2000)
- Peter Stone (1989–2000)
- John E. Ulmschneider (1992–2000)

=== Columnists ===
- Priscilla Caplan (1992–1998)
- Walt Crawford (1989–1995)
- Martin Halbert (1990–1993)
