= Athletics at the 1954 British Empire and Commonwealth Games – Women's shot put =

Women's shot put at the Commonwealth Games
- Venue: Empire Stadium
- Dates: 1 August

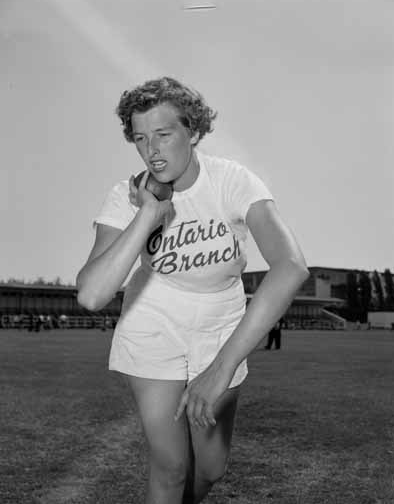
1954 British Empire and Commonwealth Games Mary Lawrence of Canada Attribution:Province newspaper

The women's shot put event at the 1954 British Empire and Commonwealth Games was held on 1 August at the Empire Stadium in Vancouver, Canada. It was the first time that the event was contested by women at the Games.

== Results ==
Rank	Name	Nationality	Result	Notes
1st place, gold medalist(s)	Yvette Williams	New Zealand	45 ft 9 1/2 in (13.96 m)	GR
2nd place, silver medalist(s)	Jackie Gelling	Canada	42 ft 7 in (12.98 m)	
3rd place, bronze medalist(s)	Magdalena Swanepoel	South Africa	42 ft 0 1/2 in (12.81 m)	
4	Valerie Lawrence	Australia	40 ft 4 3/4 in (12.31 m)	
5	Pearline Thornhill-Fisher	Northern Rhodesia	40 ft 4 1/2 in (12.31 m)	
6	Suzanne Allday	England	39 ft 2 3/4 in (11.96 m)	
7	Mary Lawrence	Canada	34 ft 2 in (10.41 m)	
8	Heather Walker	Canada	30 ft 7 in (9.32 m)	
9	Helen Metchuck	Canada	28 ft 4 1/2 in (8.65 m)	
