= Rick Bryant and the Jive Bombers =

New Zealand band

- Origin: New Zealand
- Years active: 1983–2014
- Members: Rick Bryant; Mike Croft; Kingsley Melhuish
- Past members: Alistair Dougal

Rick Bryant and the Jive Bombers were an eleven-piece band led by Rick Bryant that performed 1960s and later styles of R&B music in New Zealand. Although it started as a covers band in 1983, it gradually transformed through several line up changes, with a repertoire of Rick Bryant compositions resulting in a CD release of songs by Rick Bryant in 2004 "Time" – the title track with image compilation by Radio Active New Zealand.

In 2007–2008, the band performed shows at The London Bar in Central Auckland.

Rick Bryant had a five-decade music history in bands including Rick Bryant and the Jive Bombers, The Jubilation Gospel Choir, Blerta, the Windy City Strugglers and the Black Soap Boys. He was reported deceased on Facebook on 5 December 2019.

A drawing of Bryant was the cover of "cult classic" rock history Stranded in Paradise by John Dix (1988).

RedRocks Records released "The Black Soap from Monkeyburg" in 2013. The Black Soap Boys made an EP in 2014 which is available online.

Rick Bryant was convicted and jailed on cannabis charges in 2010.

== Band members included ==
- Rick Bryant
- Mike Croft
- Alistair Dougal
- Tom Ludvigson
- Mike Fullerton
- Wayne Baird
- Andrew Kimber
- Chris Neilson
- Andrew Clouston
- Jeff Hill
- Janelle Aston
- Merrin Smith
- Joanna Clouston
- Andrew Langsford
- Cadzow Cossar

== Discography ==
Date of Release	Title	Label	Charted	Country	Catalog Number
1997	Time	Red Rocks Records 2013 "The Black Soap from Monkeyburg" (Red Rocks Records)	-	-	
