= Peter Barr (nurseryman) =

British botanist (1826-1909)

Peter Barr (1826–1909) was a Scottish nurseryman and merchant, best known for daffodils.

== Life ==
He was born in Govan, Lanarkshire, the son of James Barr, a mill owner, and his wife, Mary Findlay. From a seed shop in Glasgow, he moved to a seed merchant's in Newry, and then went into business in 1852 in a partnership in Worcester, concentrating on bulbs.

After a change of partners, Barr in 1860 was in the bulb trade in King Street, St James's in London. He was known for his catalogues, and for gaining the interest of British gardeners in daffodils, then neglected, inspired by the work of John Parkinson in the 17th century.

== Legacy ==
The Peter Barr Memorial Cup is awarded each year by the Royal Horticultural Society to somebody who has done good work in relation to daffodils.
