= Matthew Trundle =

British-born New Zealand academic (1965–2019)

- Born: Matthew Freeman Trundle; 12 October 1965; London, England
- Died: 12 July 2019 (aged 53); Wellington, New Zealand

Academic background
- Education: University of Nottingham (BA); McMaster University (MA, PhD)
- Thesis: The classical Greek mercenary and his relationship to the Greek polis (1996)
- Doctoral advisor: Daniel J. Geagan

Academic work
- Discipline: Classics
- Institutions: Glendon College; Victoria University of Wellington; University of Auckland
- Main interests: Ancient Greek social, economic and military history

Matthew Freeman Trundle (12 October 1965 – 12 July 2019) was a British-born New Zealand academic. From 1999 until 2012 he was a member of the Classics Programme at Victoria University of Wellington. From 2012 until his death in 2019 he was a professor of classics and ancient history at the University of Auckland.

== Biography ==
Born in London, England, in 1965, Trundle was the son of Reginald and Elizabeth (née Sydney) Trundle. He studied at the University of Nottingham, graduating with a Bachelor of Arts with joint honours. He then completed a Master of Arts in Roman History and a PhD in Greek history at McMaster University in Canada. The title of his doctoral thesis, supervised by Daniel J. Geagan, was The classical Greek mercenary and his relationship to the Greek polis.

After a period teaching at Glendon College in Toronto, and carrying out research at excavations in Corinth and Isthmia in Greece, Trundle was appointed as a lecturer in classics at Victoria University of Wellington. He rose to the rank of associate professor in 2011, before being appointed to a chair in classics and ancient history at the University of Auckland the following year. His research interests were primarily related to ancient Greek economic, social and military history.

His wife, Catherine Trundle, was a member of the Anthropology Programme at Victoria University of Wellington. Matthew Trundle died from leukaemia in Wellington on 12 July 2019. A commemorative volume, Money, Warfare and Power in the Ancient World, was published in 2024.

== Selected publications ==
- Trundle, Matthew (2004). Greek mercenaries: from the late archaic to Alexander. London: Routledge. ISBN 0415338123.
- Fagan, Garrett G.; Trundle, Matthew, eds. (2010). New perspectives on ancient warfare. History of Warfare. Vol. 59. Leiden: Brill. ISBN 978-9004185982.
- Trundle, Matthew (2017). "Coinage and democracy: economic redistribution as the basis of democratic Athens". In Evans, Richard J. (ed.). Mass and elite in the Greek and Roman worlds: from Sparta to late antiquity. Acta Classica. Vol. 7. pp. 11–20.
- Trundle, Matthew (2020). "Violence, Law, and Community in Classical Athens.". In Fagan, G.G. (ed.). The Cambridge World History of Violence. Cambridge University Press. pp. 533–49.
