= Les Downes =

New Zealand cricketer (1945–2019)

Personal information
- Full name: Leslie William Downes
- Born: 19 September 1945; Lower Hutt, New Zealand
- Died: 9 November 2019 (aged 74); Palmerston North, New Zealand
- Batting: Right-handed
- Role: Wicket-keeper

Domestic team information
- Years: Team
- 1975/76: Central Districts

Career statistics
Competition	First-class	List A
Matches	8	1
Runs scored	289	1
Batting average	35.87	1.00
100s/50s	0/2	0/0
Top score	89*	1
Catches/stumpings	24/2	1/0
- Source: Cricinfo, 14 November 2019

Leslie William Downes (19 September 1945 – 9 November 2019) was a New Zealand first-class cricketer who played for Central Districts in 1975–76.

Downes was born in Lower Hutt, New Zealand. He was a wicketkeeper-batsman who had a long career for Manawatu in the Hawke Cup from 1965 to 1980, captaining the team for many years, but he played only one season for Central Districts. He had an outstanding match against Canterbury at Nelson, taking six catches in Canterbury's first innings and making his highest score of 89 not out in Central Districts’ second innings.

Downes also played soccer for Manawatu. He coached cricket and soccer and served on the Manawatu cricket and soccer associations. He worked in insurance, investment, marketing and real estate.
