= 2019 in music =

This topic covers notable events and articles related to 2019 in music.

== Specific locations ==
- African music
- American music
- Asian music
- Australian music
- Brazilian music
- British music
- Canadian music
- Chinese music
- Czech music
- Danish music
- European music
- Finnish music
- French music
- German music
- Icelandic music
- Indian music
- Indonesian music
- Irish music
- Japanese music
- Latin music
- Malaysian music
- Monogolian music
- Norwegian music
- Philippine music
- Polynesian music
- Scandinavian music
- South Korean music
- Swedish music
- Taiwanese music
- Vietnamese music

== Specific genres ==
- Classical
- Country
- Electronic
- Jazz
- Latin
- Heavy metal
- Hip-hop
- Musical theater
- Progressive rock
- Rock
- Pop
- K-pop

== Awards ==
61st Annual Grammy Awards (USA)
Record of the Year: "This is America" by Childish Gambino • Album of the Year: Golden Hour by Kacey Musgraves • Song of the Year: "This is America" by Childish Gambino • Best New Artist: Dua Lipa
2019 Billboard Music Awards (USA)
Top Artist: Drake • Top Male Artist: Drake • Top Female Artist: Ariana Grande • Top New Artist: Juice Wrld • Top Duo/Group:BTS • Top Billboard 200 Album: Scorpion by Drake • Top Hot 100 Song: "Girls Like You" by Maroon 5 featuring Cardi B
2019 Brit Awards (UK)
British Album of the Year: A Brief Inquiry into Online Relationships by The 1975 • British Single of the Year: "One Kiss" by Calvin Harris and Dua Lipa • British Breakthrough Act: Tom Walker • British Video: "Woman Like Me" by Little Mix featuring Nicki Minaj
2019 Juno Awards (Canada)
Artist of the Year: Shawn Mendes • Group of the Year: Arkells • Album of the Year: Shawn Mendes by Shawn Mendes • Single of the Year: "In My Blood" by Shawn Mendes
33rd Golden Disc Awards (South Korea)
Digital Daesang: "Love Scenario" by iKon • Album Daesang: Love Yourself: Answer by BTS
2019 MTV Video Music Awards (USA)
Video of the Year: "You Need to Calm Down" by Taylor Swift • Song of the Year: Old Town Road (Remix) by Lil Nas X featuring Billy Ray Cyrus • Artist of the Year: Ariana Grande • Best Group: BTS • Best New Artist: Billie Eilish • Best Collaboration: "Señorita" by Shawn Mendes and Camila Cabello
2019 MTV Europe Music Awards (Europe)
Best Song: "Bad Guy" by Billie Eilish • Best Video: "Me!" by Taylor Swift featuring Brendon Urie of Panic! at the Disco • Best Artist: Shawn Mendes • Best Group: BTS • Best New: Billie Eilish • Best Collaboration: "Con Altura" by Rosalía and J Balvin (featuring El Guincho)
American Music Awards of 2019 (USA)
Artist of the Decade: Taylor Swift • Artist of the Year: Taylor Swift • New Artist of the Year: Billie Eilish • Collaboration of the Year: "Señorita" by Shawn Mendes and Camila Cabello • Tour of the Year: Love Yourself World Tour by BTS
2019 Pulitzer Prize for Music (USA)
Prism by Ellen Reid
Rock and Roll Hall of Fame (USA)
Inductees: The Cure • Def Leppard • Janet Jackson • Stevie Nicks • Radiohead • Roxy Music • The Zombies
Mercury Prize (UK)
Psychodrama by Dave
Polaris Music Prize (Canada)
13th Floor by Haviah Mighty
Eurovision Song Contest 2019 (Europe)
"Arcade" by Duncan Laurence (The Netherlands)
28th Seoul Music Awards (South Korea)
Grand Prize: BTS • Best Album: Love Yourself: Tear • Best Song: iKon: "Love Scenario • Best New Artist: Stray Kids, Iz*One

== Bands formed ==
- 1Team
- 1the9
- 3YE
- AB6IX
- ALI
- ALLMO$T
- Ariaz
- Argon
- Argonavis from BanG Dream!
- Ballistik Boyz from Exile Tribe
- BDC
- Better Oblivion Community Center
- Beyooooonds
- Bis
- B.O.L.T
- Bonny Light Horseman
- Bvndit
- Carry Loose
- CGM48
- Chat Pile
- Cherry Bullet
- Chubby and the Gang
- CIX
- College Cosmos
- D1CE
- DEL48
- Dialogue
- Dos Monos
- DracoVirgo
- ENOi
- Everglow
- EXO-SC
- Fanatics
- Florence Road
- Frost Children
- Girls²
- Grupo Frontera
- The Highwomen
- Hinatazaka46
- Hinapia
- Honest Boyz
- Horsegirl
- Household Gods
- Itzy
- Jus2
- King Gnu
- Legss
- Lifeguard
- Mameshiba no Taigun
- Newkidd
- @onefive
- Oneus
- Onewe
- OnlyOneOf
- Purplebeck
- Purple Mountains
- Real Like You
- Rocket Punch
- Rolling Quartz
- Sard Underground
- Sault
- SB19
- Simple Creatures
- Sprints
- Static Dress
- Sunday Service Choir
- SuperM
- Sweeping Promises
- Sweet Pill
- Tebasaki Sensation
- Teen Teen
- Tomorrow X Together
- Verivery
- WayV
- We in the Zone
- Wet Leg
- Wooseok x Kuanlin
- X1
- Yard Act
- Yoasobi
- ZOC

== Soloist debuts ==
- Akari Kitō
- Baby Keem
- Bae Jin-young
- Baekhyun
- Benee
- Breskvica
- Camilo
- Chen
- Chen Zhuoxuan
- Chih Siou
- Chloe Moriondo
- Children of Bodom
- Davina Michelle
- Devito
- Dove Cameron
- Eito
- Elaine
- Elle Winter
- Elyanna
- Emilia Mernes
- Gracie Abrams
- Griff
- Ian Chan
- Haruka Fukuhara
- Ha Sung-woon
- Hwasa
- Im Hyun-sik
- Jace Chan
- Jang Dong-woo
- Jeon Somi
- Jung Dae-hyun
- Joyce Pring
- Kang Daniel
- Kang Min-kyung
- KD Estrada
- Keung To
- Kim Jin-woo
- Kim Ji-yeon
- Kim Jung-mo
- Kim Woo-sung
- Kwon Hyun-bin
- Latto
- Lee Jin-hyuk
- Lee Jin-young
- Lee Min-hyuk
- María Becerra
- Mayu Maeshima
- Milet
- Nichkhun
- Nicki Nicole
- Oh Ha-young
- Park Ji-hoon
- Renforshort
- Roh Tae-hyun
- Ruann
- Sayaka Yamamoto
- Shen Yue
- Sulli
- Sungmin
- Tate McRae
- Terence Lam
- Teya Dora
- U-Know
- U-Kwon
- Vaundy
- Voyage
- Yoon Ji-sung
- Yoona
- Yukika
- Yuuri
- Zelo
- Zephanie

== Bands reformed ==
- Alphabeat
- Bauhaus
- Bikini Kill
- The Black Crowes
- Egypt Central
- funeral for a friend
- Heart
- Idiot Pilot
- Jawbox
- Jonas Brothers
- McFly
- Men at Work
- Motion City Soundtrack
- My Chemical Romance
- Oysterhead
- Rage Against the Machine
- The Rapture
- Rockpile
- Roxy Music (one performance)
- Stereolab
- Stereos
- Strange Advance
- Supergrass
- The Pussycat Dolls
- Vex Red
- Vivian Girls

== Bands on hiatus ==
- An Cafe
- Blu-Billion
- DNCE
- Devin Townsend Project
- Fifth Harmony
- fun.
- f(x)
- Hedley
- Katatonia
- Linkin Park
- Moose Blood
- One Direction
- Shinee

== Bands disbanded ==
- Act of Defiance
- Alpine
- The Apocalypse Blues Revue
- The Damned Things
- Belanova
- Boyzone
- Cassius
- The Cranberries
- Country Girls
- Delorean
- Divinyls
- Fischerspooner
- Flower
- Free Cake for Every Creature
- Her's
- Hobbs' Angel of Death
- Hollerado
- The Hoopers
- Janne Da Arc
- Kalafina
- Kinoko Teikoku
- Little Green Cars
- Lower Than Atlantis
- The Muffs
- The Pains of Being Pure at Heart
- Negoto
- Nine Muses
- Pentagon
- Prophets of Rage
- Purple Mountains
- Rah Rah
- Rock a Japonica
- Roxette
- The Searchers
- Serebro
- Slayer
- Spandau Ballet
- Superjoint
- SOB X RBE
- Spice Girls
- Thursday
- Tsuri Bit
- Toto
- Yeasayer
- Wake Up, Girls!

== Deaths ==
=== January ===
- 1
  - Shane Bisnett, 31, American metalcore bassist (Ice Nine Kills)
  - Feis Ecktuh, 32, Dutch rapper
  - Joan Guinjoan, 87, Spanish composer and pianist
  - Kris Kelmi, 63, Russian rock singer and keyboardist
  - Pegi Young, 66, American folk rock singer-songwriter and guitarist
- 2 – Daryl Dragon, 76, American pop keyboardist and songwriter (Captain & Tennille, The Beach Boys)
- 3 – Steve Ripley, 69, American country rock singer-songwriter and guitarist (The Tractors)
- 5
  - Alvin Fielder, 83, American jazz drummer
  - Eric Haydock, 75, British rock bassist (The Hollies)
  - Dan Tshanda, 54, South African pop singer and bassist (Splash)
- 7
  - Jimmy Hannan, 84, Australian pop singer
  - John Joubert, 91, British classical music composer
  - Clydie King, 75, American pop and rock singer
  - Houari Manar, 38, Algerian rai singer
- 9 – Joseph Jarman, 81, American jazz saxophonist (Art Ensemble of Chicago)
- 10
  - Larry Cunningham, 67, American R&B singer (The Floaters)
  - Kevin Fret, 24, Puerto Rican trap singer
- 12 – Sanger D. Shafer, 84, American country singer-songwriter
- 13
  - Glen Dale, 79, English pop singer (The Fortunes)
  - Bonnie Guitar, 95, American country singer
  - Willie Murphy, 75, American blues singer and pianist
  - David "Frenchy" O'Brien, 71, American drummer (Animotion)
- 15 – Carol Channing, 97, American Broadway and film musicals singer
- 16
  - Lorna Doom, 61, American punk rock bassist (Germs)
  - Brian Velasco, 41, Filipino hard rock drummer (Razorback)
  - Chris Wilson, 62, Australian blues singer and guitarist
- 17
  - Debi Martini, American punk rock singer and bassist (Red Aunts)
  - Ron Watson, 62, Canadian rock guitarist (Helix)
  - Reggie Young, 82, American rock guitarist (The Memphis Boys)
- 19 – Ted McKenna, 68, Scottish glam rock drummer (The Sensational Alex Harvey Band)
- 21
  - Marcel Azzola, 91, French chanson accordionist
  - Kaye Ballard, 93, American pop singer
  - Edwin Birdsong, 77, American funk keyboardist
  - Maxine Brown, 87, American country singer (The Browns)
- 23 – Oliver Mtukudzi, 66, Zimbabwean afro-jazz guitarist
- 25
  - Bruce Corbitt, 56, American thrash metal singer (Rigor Mortis, Warbeast)
  - Jacqueline Steiner, 94, American folk singer-songwriter
- 26
  - Jean Guillou, 88, French composer and classical organist
  - Michel Legrand, 86, French composer, conductor and jazz pianist
- 27 – Pepe Smith, 71, Filipino rock singer and guitarist (Juan de la Cruz Band, Speed, Glue & Shinki, Asin)
- 28 – Paul Whaley, 72, American psychedelic rock drummer (Blue Cheer, The Oxford Circle)
- 29 – James Ingram, 66, American R&B singer-songwriter
- 31 – Harold Bradley, 93, American country guitarist

=== February ===
- 1
  - Alex Brown, 52, American punk rock guitarist (Gorilla Biscuits, Project X)
  - Ayub Ogada, 63, Kenyan worldbeat singer and Nyatiti player
- 2 – Tim Landers, American emo guitarist and singer (Transit, Misser)
- 3
  - Detsl, 35, Russian rapper
  - Peter Posa, 77, New Zealand pop guitarist
- 5 – Eddy Giles, 80, American R&B and blues singer-songwriter
- 6 – Gerald English, 93, British opera singer
- 9
  - Cadet, 28, British rapper
  - Phil Western, 47, Canadian electronic synthesizer player and guitarist (Download, PlatEAU)
- 11
  - Olli Lindholm, 54, Finnish rock singer and guitarist (Yö, Appendix)
  - Harvey Scales, 78, American R&B and soul singer-songwriter
- 13 – Willy Lambregt, 59, Belgian rock guitarist (The Scabs, Vaya Con Dios)
- 15 – Kofi Burbridge, 57, American jam band keyboardist and flautist (Tedeschi Trucks Band, The Derek Trucks Band, Aquarium Rescue Unit)
- 16
  - Glenn Bell, 64, Canadian rock drummer (The Cooper Brothers)
  - Ken Nordine, 98, American jazz spoken word artist
- 17 – Ethel Ennis, 86, American jazz singer
- 19 – Artie Wayne, 77, American pop singer, songwriter and producer
- 20
  - Dominick Argento, 91, American classical music composer
  - Gerard Koerts, 71, Dutch progressive rock keyboardist (Earth and Fire)
- 21
  - Gus Backus, 81, American doo-wop singer (The Del-Vikings)
  - Jackie Shane, 78, American soul singer
  - Peter Tork, 77, American rock bassist and singer (The Monkees)
- 23 – Dorothy Masuka, 83, Zimbabwean-born South African jazz singer-songwriter
- 24 – Mac Wiseman, 93, American bluegrass singer and guitarist (Foggy Mountain Boys)
- 25 – Mark Hollis, 64, British new wave and post-rock singer, songwriter and multi-instrumentalist (Talk Talk)
- 26 – Andy Anderson, 68, British new wave drummer (The Cure, The Glove, Hawkwind)
- 27 – Doug Sandom, 89, British rock drummer (The Who)
- 28
  - Stephan Ellis, 69, American rock bassist (Survivor)
  - André Previn, 89, German-born American jazz and classical pianist, conductor and composer

=== March ===
- 1 – Paul Williams, 78, British rock and blues singer (Zoot Money's Big Roll Band, Juicy Lucy, Tempest, Allan Holdsworth)
- 2 – Al Hazan, 84, American pianist (B. Bumble and the Stingers), songwriter and record producer
- 3 – Leo de Castro, 70, New Zealand funk and soul singer and guitarist
- 4
  - Keith Flint, 49, British electronica singer (The Prodigy)
  - Sara Romweber, 55, American jangle pop drummer (Let's Active, Dex Romweber Duo)
- 5 – Jacques Loussier, 84, French jazz pianist and film score composer (Jacques Loussier Trio)
- 6
  - James Dapogny, 78, American jazz pianist and musicologist
  - Mike Grose, 77, British rock bassist (Queen)
  - Charlie Panigoniak, 72, Canadian Inuk folk singer-songwriter
- 8 – Eddie Taylor Jr., 46, American blues singer and guitarist
- 10 – Asa Brebner, 65, American power pop singer, songwriter and guitarist (The Modern Lovers, Robin Lane & The Chartbusters)
- 11
  - Hal Blaine, 90, American rock and pop drummer (The Wrecking Crew)
  - Danny Kustow, 63, British punk rock guitarist (Tom Robinson Band)
- 12 – John Kilzer, 62, American rock singer-songwriter
- 16
  - Dick Dale, 81, American surf rock guitarist
  - Dewayne "Son" Smith, 76, American country music singer and guitarist (The Geezinslaw Brothers)
  - David White, 79, American doo-wop and pop singer (Danny & the Juniors, The Spokesmen)
- 17
  - Wolfgang Meyer, 64, German classical clarinetist
  - Bernie Tormé, 66, Irish guitarist (Gillan, Guy McCoy Tormé, Atomic Rooster, Desperado)
  - Yuya Uchida, 79, Japanese rock musician (Flower Travellin' Band)
  - Andre Williams, 82, American R&B singer
- 20 – Terje Nilsen, 67, Norwegian pop singer-songwriter
- 21 – Doris Duke, 77, American gospel and soul singer
- 22 – Scott Walker, 76, American-born British pop and avant garde singer-songwriter (The Walker Brothers)
- 23 – Shahnaz Rahmatullah, 66, Bangladeshi playback singer
- 25 – Bill Isles, 78, American R&B singer (The O'Jays)
- 26 – Ranking Roger, 56, British ska and new wave singer (The Beat, General Public)
- 27
  - Stephen Fitzpatrick, 24, British indie rock singer and guitarist (Her's)
  - Audun Laading, 25, Norwegian indie rock bassist (Her's)
- 30
  - Geoff Harvey, 83, British-Australian television music composer and pianist
  - Simaro Lutumba, 81, Congolese soukous guitarist (TPOK Jazz)
- 31 – Nipsey Hussle, 33, American rapper

=== April ===
- 1 – Armando Vega Gil, 64, Mexican rock bassist (Botellita de Jerez)
- 2
  - Rick Elias, American contemporary Christian singer-songwriter and guitarist (A Ragamuffin Band)
  - Kim English, 48, American house and gospel singer
- 3 - Shawn Smith, 53, American alternative rock singer and keyboardist (Brad, Satchel, Pigeonhed)
- 4
  - Alberto Cortez, 79, Argentine pop singer-songwriter
  - Tiger Merritt, 31, American psychedelic rock singer and guitarist (Morning Teleportation)
- 5
  - Pastor López, 74, Venezuelan cumbia singer-songwriter and bandleader
  - Davey Williams, 66, American avant-garde and free jazz guitarist (Curlew)
  - Wowaka, 31, Japanese Vocaloid producer, singer and guitarist
- 6
  - Jim Glaser, 81, American country singer
  - Ib Glindemann, 84, Danish jazz bandleader and composer
- 10 – Earl Thomas Conley, 77, American country singer-songwriter
- 12 – Johnny Hutchinson, 78, British rock and roll drummer (The Big Three)
- 13 – Paul Raymond, 73, British hard rock keyboardist (UFO, Savoy Brown, Chicken Shack)
- 15
  - Les Reed, 83, British pop bandleader and songwriter
  - Joe Terry, 78, American rock and roll singer (Danny & the Juniors)
- 18 – Eddie Tigner, 92, American blues singer and keyboardist
- 20 – Martin Böttcher, 91, German classical composer, arranger and conductor
- 22
  - Heather Harper, 88, Northern Irish classical singer
  - Dave Samuels, 70, American jazz vibraphonist and marimba player (Spyro Gyra)
- 23 – Earl Edwards, 82, American R&B singer and songwriter (The Dukays)
- 24 – Dick Rivers, 74, French rock and roll singer (Les Chats Sauvages)
- 26 – Phil McCormack, 58, American southern rock singer (Molly Hatchet)
- 30
  - Boon Gould, 64, English new wave guitarist (Level 42)
  - Beth Carvalho, 72, Brazilian samba singer

=== May ===
- 2
  - John Starling, 79, American bluegrass guitarist (The Seldom Scene)
  - Juan Vicente Torrealba, 102, Venezuelan harpist and composer
- 3 – Mose Se Sengo, 73, Congolese jazz guitarist (TPOK Jazz)
- 4 – J. R. Cobb, 75, American rock guitarist and songwriter (Atlanta Rhythm Section, Classics IV)
- 6 – Pekka Airaksinen, 73, Finnish electronic composer
- 7 – Subir Nandi, 66, Bangladeshi playback singer
- 8
  - Luther Jennings, 86, American gospel singer (Jackson Southernaires)
  - Yevgeny Krylatov, 85, Russian film composer
- 9
  - Malcolm Black, 58, New Zealand new wave singer and guitarist (Netherworld Dancing Toys)
  - Preston Epps, 88, American percussionist
  - Freddie Starr, 76, English stand up comedian, impressionist and singer
- 11 – Peggy Lipton, 72, American pop singer and actress
- 13 – Doris Day, 97, American pop singer and actress
- 14
  - Leon Rausch, 91, American country singer (Bob Wills and the Texas Playboys)
  - Mike Wilhelm, 77, American psychedelic rock guitarist (The Charlatans, Flamin' Groovies)
- 15
  - Chuck Barksdale, 84, American R&B singer (The Dells)
  - Huelyn Duvall, 79, American rockabilly singer and guitarist
- 16 – Sol Yaged, 93, American jazz clarinetist
- 17 – Eric Moore, 67, American hard rock singer and bassist (The Godz)
- 18
  - Melvin Edmonds, 65, American new jack swing singer (After 7)
  - Geneviève Waïte, 71, South African pop singer
- 19 – Alfred Janson, 82, Norwegian classical pianist and composer
- 21 – Jake Black, 59, British acid jazz singer and songwriter (Alabama 3)
- 28
  - Willie Ford, 68, American soul singer (The Dramatics)
  - John Gary Williams, 73, American R&B singer (The Mad Lads)
- 29
  - Tony Glover, 79, American blues singer and harmonica player (Koerner, Ray & Glover)
  - Jeff Walls, 62, American jangle pop guitarist (Guadalcanal Diary)
- 30 – Leon Redbone, 69, Cypriot-American jazz and ragtime singer and guitarist
- 31 – Roky Erickson, 71, American psychedelic rock singer-songwriter (The 13th Floor Elevators)

=== June ===
- 2 – Paulo Pagni, 61, Brazilian rock drummer (RPM)
- 4 – Mikey Dees, American punk rock singer and guitarist (Fitz of Depression)
- 5 – Brian Doherty, 51, American alternative rock guitarist (Big Wreck)
- 6 – Dr. John, 77, American R&B and jazz singer-songwriter and keyboardist
- 8 – Andre Matos, 47, Brazilian heavy metal singer (Viper, Angra, Shaman)
- 9
  - Bushwick Bill, 52, Jamaican-born American rapper (Geto Boys)
  - Jim Pike, 82, American pop singer (The Lettermen)
- 10
  - Chuck Glaser, 83, American country singer (Tompall & the Glaser Brothers)
  - Paul "Lil' Buck" Sinegal, 75, American blues and zydeco guitarist
- 13 - Nature Ganganbaigal, 29, Chinese folk metal guitarist and multi-instrumentalist (Tengger Cavalry)
- 16
  - Bishop Bullwinkle, 70, American soul and novelty singer
  - Sergey Ostroumov, 53, Russian blues rock drummer (Mashina Vremeni)
- 19 – Philippe Zdar, 52, French house musician and producer (Cassius)
- 21 – Kelly Jay Fordham, 77, Canadian rock singer-songwriter and keyboardist (Crowbar)
- 23 – Dave Bartholomew, 100, American R&B and rock and roll trumpeter, composer and bandleader
- 24 – Jeff Austin, 45, American bluegrass singer and mandolinist (Yonder Mountain String Band)
- 27
  - Gualberto Castro, 84, Mexican pop singer (Los Hermanos Castro)
  - Louis Thiry, 84, French classical organist
- 29 – Gary Duncan, 72, American psychedelic rock guitarist (Quicksilver Messenger Service)

=== July ===
- 1
  - Sid Ramin, 100, American composer and arranger
  - Bogusław Schaeffer, 90, Polish classical composer
- 2
  - Ibrahim Emin, 56, Azerbaijani heavy metal bassist (Yukhu)
  - Dante Rossi, 77, American garage rock guitarist and singer (The Baskerville Hounds)
- 6
  - João Gilberto, 88, Brazilian bossa nova singer and guitarist
  - Thommy Gustafsson, 71, Swedish pop keyboardist (Sven-Ingvars)
  - Yannis Spathas, 68, Greek hard rock guitarist (Socrates Drank the Conium)
  - Wanda Warska, 89, Polish jazz singer-songwriter
- 9 – Aaron Rosand, 92, American classical violinist
- 10 – Jerry Lawson, 75, American a cappella singer (The Persuasions)
- 12
  - Dick Richards, 95, American rock and roll drummer (Bill Haley & His Comets)
  - Russell Smith, 70, American country rock singer (Amazing Rhythm Aces, Run C&W)
- 16
  - Johnny Clegg, 66, South African afro-pop singer and guitarist (Juluka, Savuka)
  - Pat Kelly, 70, Jamaican reggae singer
  - Bill Vitt, American rock drummer (Jerry Garcia, Merl Saunders)
- 18 – Bob Frank, 75, American folk singer-songwriter
- 19 – Yao Lee, 96, Chinese pop singer
- 21 – Ben Johnston, 93, American microtonal composer
- 22
  - Daniel Rae Costello, 58, Fijian folk guitarist
  - Art Neville, 81, American funk and R&B keyboardist (The Meters, The Neville Brothers)
- 25 – Anner Bylsma, 85, Dutch classical cellist
- 26 – Cacik Jonne, 54, Brazilian axé guitarist and composer (Chiclete com Banana)
- 29 – Ras G, 39, American instrumental hip-hop producer
- 30 – Lol Mason, 69, English progressive rock singer (City Boy, The Maisonettes)
- 31 - Nigel Benjamin, 64, British rock singer (Mott, London)

=== August ===
- 1
  - Ian Gibbons, 67, British rock keyboardist (The Kinks)
  - Hamid Ali Khan, 66, Pakistani classical singer
- 3
  - Damien Lovelock, 65, Australian rock singer (The Celibate Rifles)
  - Katreese Barnes, 56, American R&B singer-songwriter (Juicy)
- 4 – Bob Wilber, 91, American jazz clarinetist
- 5 – Lizzie Grey, 60, American glam metal guitarist (Spiders & Snakes, London)
- 6 – Danny Doyle, 79, Irish folk singer
- 7
  - David Berman, 52, American indie rock singer-songwriter (Silver Jews, Purple Mountains)
  - Francesca Sundsten, 58, American post-punk bassist (The Beakers)
  - Nicky Wonder, 59, American power pop guitarist (Wondermints, Brian Wilson)
- 11 – Jim Cullum Jr., 77, American jazz cornetist
- 12 – DJ Arafat, 33, Ivorian Coupé-Décalé singer and disk jockey
- 19 – Larry Taylor, 77, American bass guitarist (Canned Heat)
- 21 – Celso Piña, 66, Mexican cumbia singer and accordionist
- 26 – Neal Casal, 50, American rock guitarist (Chris Robinson Brotherhood, Ryan Adams & the Cardinals, Blackfoot)
- 27 – Donnie Fritts, 76, American country keyboardist and songwriter
- 28 – Nancy Holloway, 86, American jazz and pop singer
- 29 – Jimmy Pitman, 72, American rock singer, songwriter and guitarist (Strawberry Alarm Clock)

=== September ===
- 2 – Laurent Sinclar, 58, French new wave keyboardist (Taxi Girl)
- 4 – Dan Warner, 49, American Latin pop guitarist
- 5 – Jimmy Johnson, 76, American rock and soul guitarist (Muscle Shoals Rhythm Section)
- 7 – Camilo Sesto, 72, Spanish pop singer
- 9
  - Gru, 46, Serbian rapper
  - Lavrentis Machairitsas, 62, Greek rock singer and guitarist
- 10
  - Jeff Fenholt, 68, American rock and Christian contemporary singer (Bible Black, Geezer Butler Band)
  - Daniel Johnston, 58, American lo-fi folk singer-songwriter
  - Hossam Ramzy, 65, Egyptian-born jazz rock percussionist
- 13 – Eddie Money, 70, American pop rock singer
- 15
  - Roberto Leal, 67, Portuguese-Brazilian pop singer
  - Ric Ocasek, 75, American new wave singer-songwriter and guitarist (The Cars)
  - Mick Schauer, 46, American stoner rock keyboardist (Clutch)
- 16
  - John Cohen, 87, American folk banjoist and guitarist (New Lost City Ramblers)
  - Vic Vogel, 84, Canadian jazz pianist
- 17 – Alexandr Vasilyev, Russian new wave drummer (Center)
- 18 – Tony Mills, 57, British hard rock singer (Shy, TNT)
- 19
  - Sandie Jones, 68, Irish pop singer
  - Harold Mabern, 83, American jazz pianist
  - María Rivas, 59, Venezuelan Latin jazz singer
  - Yonrico Scott, 63, American rock and blues drummer (The Derek Trucks Band)
  - Larry Wallis, 70, British rock guitarist (Pink Fairies, Motörhead)
- 21
  - Margie Clarke, 74, American R&B singer (The Jewels)
  - Woo Hye-mi, 31, South Korean pop singer
- 23
  - Richard Brunelle, 55, American heavy metal guitarist (Morbid Angel, Paths of Possession)
  - Robert Hunter, 78, American rock lyricist and multi-instrumentalist (Grateful Dead)
- 26
  - Jim Johnson, 76, American rock guitarist and singer (Gypsy)
  - Jimmy Spicer, 61, American rapper
  - Martin Wesley-Smith, 74, Australian classical composer
- 28
  - Dessie O'Halloran, 79, Irish folk fiddler and singer
  - José José, 71, Mexican Latin pop singer
- 29
  - busbee, 43, American country and pop songwriter and producer
  - Larry Willis, 78, American jazz pianist (Blood, Sweat & Tears)
- 30
  - Jessye Norman, 74, American opera singer
  - Louie Rankin, 61, Jamaican-born Canadian dancehall singer

=== October ===
- 1
  - Karel Gott, 80, Czech pop singer
  - Beverly Watkins, 80, American blues guitarist
- 2
  - Barrie Masters, 63, British pub rock singer (Eddie and the Hot Rods)
  - Kim Shattuck, 56, American alternative rock singer and guitarist (The Muffs, The Pandoras, Pixies)
  - Morten Stützer, Danish thrash metal guitarist (Artillery)
- 3
  - Vinnie Bell, 87, American session guitarist
  - Mike Clough, 77, American folk singer and guitarist (The Back Porch Majority)
- 4
  - Ed Ackerson, 54, American alternative rock singer and guitarist (Polara, Antenna)
  - Glen Brown, 75, Jamaican reggae singer
- 5 – Larry Junstrom, 70, American Southern rock bassist (.38 Special, Lynyrd Skynyrd)
- 6
  - Ginger Baker, 80, British rock and jazz drummer (Cream, Blind Faith, Ginger Baker's Air Force, The Graham Bond Organisation)
- 8 – Molly Duncan, 74, British funk saxophonist (Average White Band)
- 11 – Kadri Gopalnath, 69, Indian classical and jazz saxophonist
- 12
  - George Chambers, 88, American psychedelic soul bassist and singer (The Chambers Brothers)
  - Kenny Dixon, 27, American country drummer (Kane Brown)
  - Dallas Harms, 82, Canadian country singer
  - Gerry McGee, 81, American surf rock guitarist (The Ventures)
- 13 – Steve Cash, 73, American Southern rock singer (Ozark Mountain Daredevils)
- 14 – Sulli, 25, Korean pop singer (f(x))
- 15 – Cacho Castaña, 77, Argentine bolero singer and actor
- 17 – Ray Santos, 90, American Latin pop saxophonist
- 21 – Peter Hobbs, 58, Australian thrash metal guitarist and singer (Hobbs' Angel of Death)
- 22
  - Don Baskin, 73, American garage rock singer and guitarist (Syndicate of Sound)
  - Raymond Leppard, 92, British classical conductor and harpsichordist
  - Hans Zender, 82, German classical conductor
- 25 – Joe Sun, 76, American country singer
- 26 – Paul Barrere, 71, American Southern rock guitarist (Little Feat)
- 31 – Kendra Malia, 37, American witch house singer (White Ring)

=== November ===
- 2 – Marie Laforêt, 80, French-Swiss pop singer
- 4
  - Timi Hansen, 67, Danish metal bassist (Mercyful Fate, King Diamond)
  - Jerry Hudson, 70, American rock singer (The Road)
- 5 – Jan Erik Kongshaug, 75, Norwegian jazz guitarist
- 7
  - Ivan Maksimović, 57, Serbian hard rock guitarist (Metro, The No Smoking Orchestra)
  - Gilles Bertin, 58, French punk rock singer and bassist (Camera Silens)
- 8
  - Fred Bongusto, 84, Italian pop singer
  - Ramakant Gundecha, Indian dhrupad singer (Gundecha Brothers)
- 9 – Taiwo Lijadu, 71, Nigerian Afrobeat singer (Lijadu Sisters)
- 10 – Jan Byrczek, 83, Polish jazz bassist
- 11 – Bad Azz, 43, American rapper
- 16 – Éric Morena, 68, French pop singer
- 19
  - José Mário Branco, 77, Portuguese folk singer-songwriter
  - Lloyd Watson, 70, British rock guitarist
- 20
  - Doug Lubahn, 71, American psychedelic rock and jazz bassist (Clear Light, The Doors)
  - John Mann, 57, Canadian folk rock singer-songwriter and guitarist (Spirit of the West)
- 21
  - Donna Carson, 73, American folk singer (Hedge and Donna)
  - Farris Lanier Jr., 70, American R&B-soul-funk singer (Lanier & Co.)
- 22 – Eduardo Nascimento, 76, Angolan pop singer
- 24
  - Goo Hara, 28, South Korean K-pop singer (Kara)
  - Mary Nance, 72, American pop singer (The Sunshine Company)
- 25 – Iain Sutherland, 71, British folk singer and guitarist (The Sutherland Brothers)
- 27 – Martin Armiger, 70, Australian new wave singer and guitarist (The Sports)
- 28 – Padú del Caribe, 99, Aruban waltz songwriter
- 29 – Irving Burgie, 95, American calypso songwriter
- 30 – Howard "Sparky" Childress, 76, American rock and roll guitarist (The Sparkletones)

=== December ===
- 1 – Stuart Fraser, Australian hard rock guitarist (Noiseworks)
- 2
  - Jimmy Cavallo, 92, American rock and roll singer
  - Greedy Smith, 63, Australian new wave singer and keyboardist (Mental as Anything)
- 3 – Shaaban Abdel Rahim, 62, Egyptian sha'abi singer
- 4 – Rosa Morena, 78, Spanish flamenco pop singer
- 5 – Jerry Naylor, 80, American rock and roll musician (The Crickets)
- 7
  - Herb Cox, 81, American doo-wop singer and songwriter (The Cleftones)
  - Herbert Joos, 79, German jazz trumpeter and flugelhornist
  - Joe McQueen, 100, American jazz saxophonist
- 8 – Juice Wrld, 21, American rapper
- 9 – Marie Fredriksson, 61, Swedish pop rock singer (Roxette)
- 10 – Gershon Kingsley, 97, German-born American electronic composer and synthesizer player
- 12 – Jack Scott, 83, Canadian rock and roll singer
- 13
  - Roy Loney, 73, American garage rock singer and guitarist (Flamin' Groovies)
  - Emil Richards, 87, American classical and jazz vibraphonist
- 14 – Irv Williams, 100, American jazz saxophonist
- 15 - Monique Leyrac, 91, Canadian pop singer
- 18
  - Patxi Andión, 72, Spanish pop singer-songwriter
  - Alain Barrière, 84, French chanson singer
  - Kenny Lynch, 81, British pop singer
  - Arty McGlynn, 75, Irish folk guitarist (Patrick Street)
  - Abbey Simon, 99, American classical pianist
- 22 – Ubirajara Penacho dos Reis, 85, Brazilian jazz bassist
- 24
  - Dave Riley, 59, American punk rock bassist (Big Black)
  - Allee Willis, 72, American pop and funk songwriter
- 25
  - Kelly Fraser, 26, Canadian pop singer-songwriter
  - Peter Schreier, 84, German opera tenor and conductor
- 26 – Sleepy LaBeef, 84, American rockabilly singer and guitarist
- 27
  - Don Imus, 79, American recording artist
  - Garrett List, 76, American jazz trombonist and singer
  - Jack Sheldon, 75, American jazz and children's music singer and trumpeter
  - Art Sullivan, 69, Belgian pop singer
- 28
  - Amy Patterson, 107, Argentine classical singer and composer
  - Erzsébet Szőnyi, 95, Hungarian classical and opera composer
- 29
  - Neil Innes, 75, British comedy rock singer-songwriter and guitarist (Bonzo Dog Doo-Dah Band, The Rutles, Monty Python)
  - Norma Tanega, 80, American folk singer-songwriter

== Musical films ==
- Cats

== See also ==
- Timeline of musical events
- Women in music
