= 2019 in European music =

2019 in continental European music in geographical order.

== Events ==
- May 18 – The finale of the 64th Eurovision Song Contest takes place in Tel Aviv, Israel. It is won by Duncan Laurence, representing the Netherlands with the song "Arcade". It is the Netherlands' first win since 1975.

== Scandinavia ==
- Main article for Scandinavian music in 2019

=== Top hits ===
- Danish #1s
- Finnish #1 singles 2019, Finnish #1 albums
- Norway charts
- Swedish #1 singles and albums

== Netherlands ==
- Dutch #1 singles

== Ireland ==
- Main article for Irish music in 2019

== UK ==
- Main article for British music in 2019

== Germany ==
- 15 February - Tobias Sammet's Avantasia releases Moonglow, featuring collaborations with artists such as Ronnie Atkins of Pretty Maids, Jørn Lande and Hansi Kürsch.
- See also German number ones

== Switzerland and Austria ==
- Swiss #1s

== France ==
- French #1s

== Italy ==
- Italian number ones

== Eastern Europe/ Balkans ==
- List of Polish #1 singles
- Czech #1 singles
- Hungarian #1 singles

== Musical films ==
- En del av mitt hjärta (Sweden)

== Deaths ==
- 1 January
  - Feis Ecktuh, 32, Dutch rapper (shot)
  - Joan Guinjoan, 87, Spanish composer and pianist
- 19 January – Mario Bertoncini, 86, Italian composer, pianist, and music educator
- 21 January – Marcel Azzola, 91, French accordionist
- 26 January – Michel Legrand, 86, French composer, conductor and jazz pianist, Oscar winner (1968, 1971, 1983).
- 17 February – Šaban Šaulić, 67, Serbian singer (traffic accident)
- 20 February
  - Gerard Koerts, 71, Dutch musician (Earth & Fire)
  - Ekkehard Wlaschiha, 80, German operatic baritone
- 21 February – Jean-Christophe Benoît, 93, French baritone
- 5 March – Jacques Loussier, 84, French jazz/classical pianist and composer
- 8 March – Michael Gielen, 91, Austrian conductor
- 12 March – Věra Bílá, 64, Czech singer (diabetes)
- 16 March
  - Yann-Fañch Kemener, 61, French singer
  - Yulia Nachalova, 38, Russian singer, actress and television presenter, cerebral edema.
- 1 April – Caravelli, 88, French conductor and composer
- 7 April – Gino Stefani, 89, Italian jazz musician, musicologist and semiologist
- 12 April – Dina, 62, Portuguese singer (pulmonary fibrosis)
- 16 April – Jörg Demus, 90, Austrian pianist
- 24 April – Dick Rivers, 74, French rock and roll singer (Les Chats Sauvages)
- 21 May – Nilda Fernández, 61, Spanish-born French chanson singer (heart failure)
- 31 May – Đelo Jusić, 80, Croatian composer and guitarist
- 11 June – Enrico Nascimbeni, 59, Italian singer, journalist and poet (heart attack)
- 3 August – Henri Belolo, 82, French music producer (The Ritchie Family, Village People) and songwriter.
- 2 September – Laurent Sinclair, 58, French keyboardist and composer
- 23 October – Hansheinz Schneeberger, 93, Swiss violinist.
- 28 October
  - Zoltán Jeney, 76, Hungarian composer.
  - Jitka Šuranská, 41, Czech singer and violinist, cancer.
- 31 October – Giannis Spanos, 85, Greek composer.
- 2 November
  - Leo Iorga, 54, Romanian rock singer and guitarist, cancer.
  - Marie Laforêt, 80, French-Swiss singer ("Mon amour, mon ami") and actress (Male Hunt, Who Wants to Kill Sara?).
- 8 November – Fred Bongusto, 84, Italian singer, songwriter and film composer
- 16 November – Éric Morena, 68, French singer
- 19 November
  - José Mário Branco, 77, Portuguese singer-songwriter and record producer
  - Rémy Stricker, 83, French pianist and musicologist
- 11 December – Jiří Jirmal, 94, Czech classical guitarist
- 17 December – Jacques Grimbert, 90, French conductor
- 18 December – Alain Barrière, 84, French singer and Eurovision contestant
