= 2019 in African music =

The following is a list of events and releases that have happened or are expected to happen in 2019 in African music.

== Events ==
- 9 January - Nigerian singers Simi and Adekunle Gold marry in a private ceremony.
- 15 April
  - Winners of the AfriMusic Song Contest 2019 are announced:
    - Best English Lyrics: Siboat (Ghana) – "Always and Forever"
    - Best French Lyrics: Joahn Lover (Cameroon) – "Game Over"
    - Best African Language Song: Nonzwakazi (South Africa) – "Phakama Mbokodo"
  - Abdullah Ibrahim is one of four recipients of the NEA Jazz Masters Fellowships celebrated in a concert at the John F. Kennedy Center for the Performing Arts in Washington, DC.
- 3 May - Naira Marley is arrested by the Economic and Financial Crimes Commission in Nigeria.
- 24 June - Burna Boy wins "Best International Act" at the BET Awards 2019.
- 18 September - After rumours of the death of Majek Fashek are dispelled by his manager, who confirms that Fashek has esophageal cancer and has been hospitalized at the Queen Elizabeth Hospital, London, UK, philanthropist Femi Otedola pledges to cover all the singer's medical expenses. Fashek would die the following summer.
- 19 October - Nigerian singer Teni wins the "Best Pop Single" award at The Headies 2019, for "Case".
- 23 November - Joeboy wins the "Best Artiste in African Pop" award at the All Africa Music Awards.
- 3 December - Kabza De Small is named by Spotify as the most-streamed South African artist of 2019.

== Albums released in 2019 ==
Release date	Artist	Album	Genre	Label	Ref
January 15	Falz	Moral Instruction	Hip-hop, Afrobeats	Bahd Guys Records	
January 31	Sauti Sol	Afrikan Sauce	Afro-pop, R&B	Sauti Sol Entertainment	
April 5	Sarahmée	Irréversible	Rap, Afropop	Ste=4 Musique	
April 19	Simi	Omo Charlie Champagne, Vol. 1	Afro-fusion, Afro-soul, R&B	X3M Music	
May 3	Myrath	Shehili	Progressive metal, oriental metal, Arabic music	earMUSIC	
May 24	Patoranking	Wilmer	Reggae, dancehall	Amari Musiq, Empire	
July 26	Burna Boy	African Giant	Afro-fusion, Afrobeat, dancehall, pop, hip hop	Spaceship, Bad Habit, Atlantic, Warner Music	
July 26	Hope Masike	The Exorcism of a Spinster	Afro-pop, Jazz	Riverboat Records/ World Music Network	
August 5	A.A.A	A.A.A (EP)	Folk, psychedelic rock	Indie	
August 23	Jidenna	85 to Africa	Afrobeats, hip hop	Epic	
August 30	Yemi Alade	Woman of Steel	Afrobeats, R&B, highlife	Effyzzie Music Group, Universal	
September 4	Phyno	Deal with It	Hip-hop, Igbo rap	Penthauze	
October 1	Invisible System	Dance to the Full Moon	Traditional, blues, electronic, fusion	ARC Music	
October 11	Aṣa	Lucid	Soul, folk, jazz	Chapter Two Records, Wagram Music	
November 1	Zlatan	Zanku	Afrobeats	Indie	
November 8	Ycee	Ycee vs Zaheer	Hip-hop, trap, Afrobeats, Afro-house, R&B, alte	ANBT, Mad Solutions	
November 22	Davido	A Good Time	Afropop	DMW; RCA; Sony	
November 29	DJ Maphorisa & Kabza De Small	The Return of Scorpion Kings	amapiano	Sony Music, Piano Hub & New Money Gang	
November 29	Fireboy DML	Laughter, Tears and Goosebumps	Afro-Life, R&B	YBNL Nation	
December 6	Starboy	Soundman Vol. 1 (EP)	Afrobeats, reggae, R&B	Starboy Entertainment	
December 13	Staff Benda Bilili	Effacer Le Tableau	Soukous, R&B, reggae	Wagram	

== Classical ==
- Robert Fokkens - Duo for violin and cello
- Clare Loveday - What Gives for violin and piano

== Musical films and film music ==
- Atlantics, with score by Fatima Al Qadiri

== Births ==
- October 2 - Diamond Platnumz and his partner Tanasha Donna have their first child, Naseeb Jr.

== Deaths ==
- January 5 - Dan Tshanda, 54, South African singer and guitarist of Splash; (heart attack)
- January 7 - John Joubert, 91, South African-born composer
- January 23 – Oliver Mtukudzi, 66, Zimbabwe musician
- February 8 - Sali Sidibé, 59, Malian composer and singer
- March 13 - Joseph Hanson Kwabena Nketia, 97, Ghanaian ethnomusicologist and composer
- March 30 – Simaro Lutumba, 81, Congolese musician (TPOK Jazz)
- June 2 – Piet Botha, 63, South African rock musician (pancreatic cancer)
- July 16 - Johnny Clegg, 66, South African musician (pancreatic cancer)
- August 5 – Jimi Hope, 62, Togolese musician and painter.
- August 12 – DJ Arafat, 33, Ivorian disc jockey and musician, traffic collision.
- October 4 – Elias Melka, 41, Ethiopian record producer and songwriter
- November 9 – Taiwo Lijadu, 71, Nigerian singer (Lijadu Sisters)
- December 3 – Shaaban Abdel Rahim, 62, Egyptian shaabi singer

== See also ==
- 2019 in music
