= Arthur Sullivan (disambiguation) =

Arthur Sullivan (1842–1900) was an English composer.

Arthur Sullivan may also refer to:

- Arthur Sullivan (Australian soldier) (1896–1937), Australian recipient of the Victoria Cross
- Arthur Sullivan, candidate in 1922 Manitoba general election
- Artie Sullivan, singer who worked with Dick Campbell (singer-songwriter)

== See also ==
- Art Sullivan (1950–2019), Belgian singer
