= 2019 in Asian music =

== Events ==
- January – Shankar Mahadevan is awarded the Padma Shri by the Indian government for his contributions to Film Music.
- March 1 – Opening of the 15th Jakarta International Java Jazz Festival
- March 18 – Opening night of "Sadhu for the Music", a unity concert arranged by Imee Ooi.
- April 30 – Seoul Philharmonic Orchestra announces that Osmo Vänskä will be its next musical director, as from January 2020.
- June 13 – The Chinese Opera Festival opens at the Xiqu Centre in Kowloon.

== Albums ==
- IV of Spades – ClapClapClap! (January 18)
- Arinjoy Trio – Arinjoy Trio (March)
- Babymetal – Metal Galaxy (October 8)
- Band-Maid – Conqueror (December 11)
- Soumik Datta – King of Ghosts
- December Avenue – Langit Mong Bughaw (December 20)
- The Hu – The Gereg (September 13)
- iKon – The New Kids (January 7)
- Isyana Sarasvati – Lexicon (November 29)
- Monsta X – Take.2 We Are Here (February 18)
- Parekh & Singh – Science City (May 12)
- Astha Raut – Aadhar 2 (November 28)

== Classical ==
- Akira Nishimura – Azure Dragon (for string quartet)

== Opera ==
- Aftab Darvishi and Miranda Lakerveld – Turan Dokht
- Keith Lai – Wenguang Explores the Valley
- Akira Nishimura – Asters

== Film and TV scores ==
- 4 Musics, Nadirshah, Dhanush and Madhu Vasudevan – Brother's Day
- Yuki Hayashi – Star Twinkle PreCure
- Ilaiyaraaja – Tamilarasan
- M. Jayachandran – Mamangam

== Musical films ==
- A Mero Hajur 3 (Nepal)
- Ajab Sanju Ra Gajab Love (India - Odia)
- Chaal Jeevi Laiye! (India - Gujarati)
- Cheer Boys!! (Japan)
- Chitralahari (India - Telugu)
- Dearest Anita (Hong Kong)
- Ek Ladki Ko Dekha Toh Aisa Laga (India - Hindi)
- Fall in Love at First Kiss (Taiwan)
- Gully Boy (India - Hindi)
- I Love You, You’re Perfect, Now Change (China)
- Laal Kabootar (Pakistan)
- Love Live! Sunshine!! (Japan)
- Neeyum Njanum (India - Malayalam)
- Oru Adaar Love (India - Malayalam)

== Deaths ==
- January 16 – Brian Velasco, born 1977), Filipino drummer (Razorback)
- January 17 – S. Balakrishnan, 70, Indian film score composer and music director
- January 22 – Ahmed Imtiaz Bulbul, 63, Bangladeshi lyricist, composer and music director
- January 27 – Pepe Smith, 71, Filipino rock singer and guitarist (Juan de la Cruz Band, Speed, Glue & Shinki, Asin)
- March 23 – Shahnaz Rahmatullah, 66, Bangladeshi playback singer
- April 20
  - Amar Pal, 96, folk singer
  - Wu Yili, 89, Chinese-Singaporean classical pianist
- May 12 – Hiralal Yadav, 93, Indian folk singer.
- July 19 – Yao Lee, 96, Chinese popular singer
- August 1 – Agung Hercules, 51, Indonesian actor and singer.
- August 19 – Mohammed Zahur Khayyam, 92, Indian music director and composer (Kabhie Kabhie, Umrao Jaan, Dil-e-Nadaan), lung infection.
- September 12 – Ida Laila, 76, Indonesian singer
- November 8 – Ramakant Gundecha, Indian Dhrupad performer
- November 18 – Norodom Buppha Devi, 76, Cambodian royal and prima ballerina, Minister of Culture and Fine Arts (1998–2004). was a Cambodian princess, dancer and director of the Royal Ballet of Cambodia.
- November 24
  - Goo Hara, 28, South Korean singer (suicide)
  - Mobarak Hossain Khan, 81, Bangladeshi musicologist, musician, and writer
- November 27 – He Sukun, 25, Chinese singer (suicide)
- December 1 – Michael Lai, 73, Chinese composer and actor
- December 26 – Nguyễn Văn Tý, 94, Vietnamese composer

== By country ==
- 2019 in Chinese music
- 2019 in Japanese music
- 2019 in Philippine music
- 2019 in South Korean music

== See also ==
- 2019 in music
