= Iorga =

Iorga is a Romanian surname that may refer to:

- Laurențiu Iorga (born 1988), Romanian football midfielder
- Leo Iorga (born 1964), Romanian guitarist and singer
- Nicolae Iorga (1871–1940), Romanian historian, politician, literary critic, memoirist, poet and playwright
- Vasile Iorga (1945–2003), Romanian wrestler

The term may also refer to:

- Iorga, a village in Manoleasa Commune, Botoșani County
