= Rigor Mortis (album) =

Studio album by Rigor Mortis
- Released: July 19, 1988
- Recorded: Dallas Sound Lab (Dallas)
- Genres: Thrash metal; death metal
- Length: 41:07
- Label: Capitol
- Producer: Dave Ogilvie

Rigor Mortis chronology
Rigor Mortis (1988)	Freaks (1989)

Professional ratings
Review scores
Source	Rating
AllMusic	4.5/5 stars

Rigor Mortis is the debut studio album by American thrash metal band Rigor Mortis, released on July 19, 1988 through Capitol Records.

== Track listing ==
No.	Title	Length
1.	"Welcome to Your Funeral"	3:31
2.	"Demons"	4:04
3.	"Bodily Dismemberment"	5:18
4.	"Condemned to Hell"	3:41
5.	"Wizard of Gore"	3:56
6.	"Shroud of Gloom"	2:43
7.	"Die in Pain"	3:56
8.	"Vampire"	5:00
9.	"Re-Animator"	3:23
10.	"Slow Death"	5:33
11.	"Foaming at the Mouth"	3:45
12.	"Grudge Fuck"	1:48
13.	"Spivey (Previously Unreleased)"	2:49
Total length:		41:07

== Personnel ==
- Mike Scaccia – guitar
- Casey Orr – bass, vocals
- Harden Harrison – drums
- Bruce Corbitt – vocals
