= Legss =

English rock band

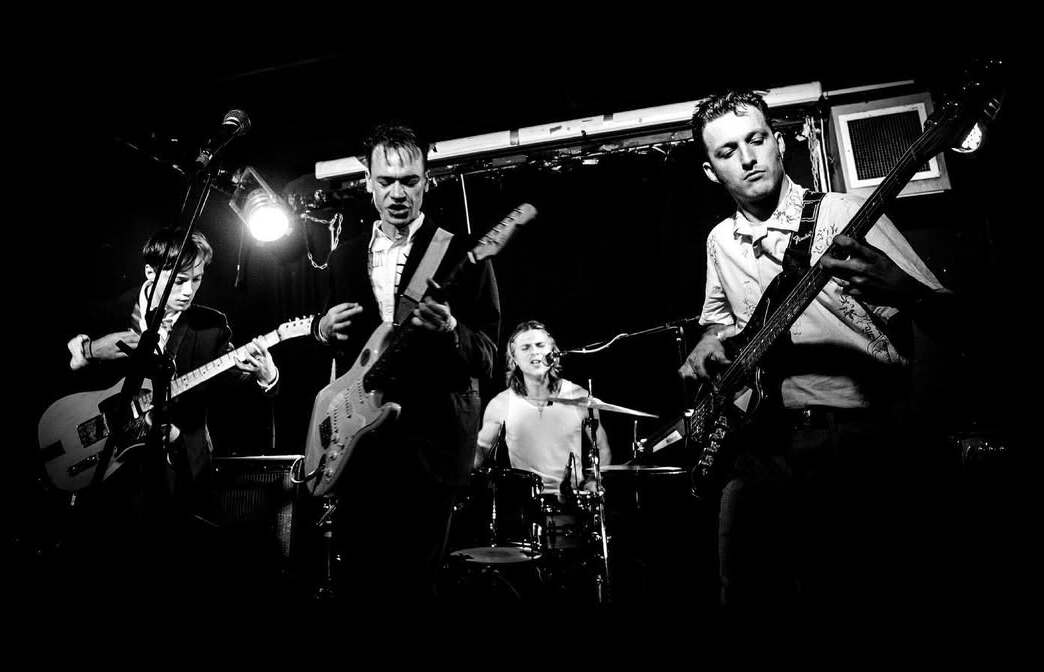

Background information
- Origin: London, United Kingdom
- Genres: Art rock
- Years active: 2019–present
- Labels: The State51 Conspiracy
- Members: Ned Green; Max Oliver; Jake Martin; Louis Grace

Legss is a London-based art rock band formed in 2018. The group consists of vocalist and guitarist Ned Green, guitarist Max Oliver, bassist Jake Martin, and drummer Louis Grace.

== History ==
The origins of Legss date to autumn 2018, when Ned Green and Max Oliver, then students at Goldsmiths, University of London, began rehearsing together under the name Self Help. The definitive formation occurred in 2019 with the arrival of bassist Jake Martin and drummer Louis Grace, after which the group began preparing its first extended play (EP). From the outset, the members expressed an interest in writing music that was intentionally uneven and disorienting, reflecting shared artistic interests and ideas associated with theorist and former Goldsmiths lecturer Mark Fisher, whose writings on culture and late capitalism would inform their work. Much of their experimentation occurred, in Max's words, "by accident", since none of the members were formally trained musicians. Green argued that this lack of technical proficiency forced them to work within narrower constraints, while Grace has described their limitations as the most important element distinguishing their work.

The band released their debut EP, Writhing Comedy, on 27 September 2019 and presented fragmented, post-punk-leaning guitar textures structured around four short narrative pieces. Its tracks included commentary on South London, graduate labour, and urban protest, and it was accompanied by a short book produced by the band. The release was followed by Good News Horse, an accompanying book of texts and visual materials created by the band. The second EP, Doomswayers, released in October 2020, expanded their focus on social observation and surreal storytelling. The term doomswayer, invented by Green, referred to a cynical observer living a "nothing life", and the EP uses musical and narrative motifs to explore this worldview, incorporating spoken narrative, extended composition, and accompanying printed material containing prose, illustrations, and unused lyrics. In August 2021 the band issued the single "Hyde Park Coroner", described by the group as depicting a wine-drunk coroner involved in a ghostly investigation.

Throughout 2022 Legss released no new material, citing the difficulty of sustaining creative momentum while working full-time jobs and managing the transition out of university life. During this period the band received mention in Simon Reynolds' afterword to the 2022 edition of Fisher's Ghosts of My Life, which acknowledged their engagement with Fisher's ideas. The group returned in 2023 with new material and a shift toward a more vulnerable, melodically driven approach. In March they released the single "The Landlord", a reflection on the pressures of adulthood, work, and artistic ambition. In May they signed with the independent label the State51 Conspiracy, following the release of their third EP, Fester, on 9 June 2023. The agreement represented a major turning point for the band, who described the opportunity as a "miracle" following a prolonged period of financial and professional struggle. Co-produced by Balázs Altsach, the EP incorporated slower tempos and greater dynamic restraint while maintaining the group's interest in social unease and alienation. Its title track, the first written for the project, set the tone for the band's new direction and contributed to Altsach becoming an important creative partner.

Work on the band's debut album began the following year. Although preliminary ideas were sketched in early 2024, the band stated that most of the compositions were written over four days of annual leave and recorded in five days due to external time constraints. On 24 April 2025 Legss released the single "Gloss", which they described as a transitional piece linking their earlier work to their developing sound. The single "909", issued on 8 July 2025 alongside the announcement of their album Unreal. The third single, "See No Evil", released in August 2025, was noted by the band as their only major-key composition to date.

Unreal was released on 12 September 2025 through the State51 Conspiracy, co-produced by Grace and Altsach. The album explores themes of miscommunication, estrangement, and the uncanny in everyday experience. It incorporates smoother vocal melodies and represents the band's first use of brass and live strings, aiming for a sense of operatic scale while maintaining their characteristic tension and abrasive dynamics. The album was reviewed positively by Cal Cashin of Clash, who gave it an 8/10, saying that "Legss are really onto something here". On 13 November 2025, Legss was included in Stereogum's list of "The 40 Best New Artists Of 2025", with journalist Chris DeVille highlighting the expressiveness of Green's vocal delivery and the band's fluid arrangements.

== Artistry ==
Legss' music is generally categorized as art rock. Vocalist Green grew up near Liverpool, giving him the softened Scouse inflections that colour his talk-sung vocal delivery. Legss have been identified as part of a broader cohort of U.K. and Irish bands that emerged in the late 2010s and early 2020s, characterized by talk-sung vocals, post-punk instrumentation and elements of post-rock. This wave includes groups such as Squid, Dry Cleaning, Yard Act, Shame and Black Country, New Road, and has been described as a response to the social and cultural atmosphere of post-Brexit Britain. According to an analysis published by NPR, the movement's music is frequently shaped by feelings of frustration, pessimism and disillusionment with contemporary British life. Legss articulate this sentiment directly in the song "On Killing a Swan Blues", in which Ned Green contrasts British emotional repression with American expressiveness, stating that his experiences "only make [him] tired".

== Members ==
Current members

- Ned Green – vocals, guitar (2019–present)
- Max Oliver – guitar (2019–present)
- Jake Martin – bass (2019–present)
- Louis Grace – drums, production (2019–present)

== Discography ==
=== Studio albums ===
- Unreal (2025)

=== EPs ===
- Writhing Comedy (2019)
- Doomswayers (2020)
- Fester (2023)
