= Enrico Nascimbeni =

Italian singer, journalist, and poet (1959–2019)

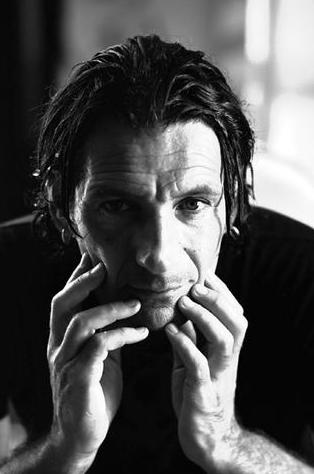
Enrico Nascimbeni

Enrico Nascimbeni (20 November 1959 – 11 June 2019) was an Italian singer, journalist and poet.

== Early life ==
He graduated from the Beccaria high school.

He formed a friendship with Roberto Vecchioni and collaborated with him on various tracks including "Vincent" and "The Last Night of an Old Dirty Star". He played with Vecchioni during the 2003 Tenco Prize which earned him the critics' prize from a jury chaired by Fernanda Pivano.

He earned two degrees in Modern Literature and Philosophy.

== Career ==
He began his career as a journalist in 1985 following in the footsteps of his father Giulio Nascimbeni. He collaborated with Corriere d'Informazione and Corriere della Sera and worked steadily for Il Giorno, L'Arena, L'Indipendente, Studio Aperto, Verissimo and Sette. In 2000, for La 7 Gold he conducted a four-hour live entertainment broadcast program. It deals with crime news, judicial and war news, Mani Pulite interviewed Bettino Craxi in Hammamet for the occasion. On this story he wrote for the Mondadori, with Andrea Pamparana, the book The Clean Hands. He was a special envoy during the Balkan war in Sarajevo. Previously he had followed the war in Lebanon on the spot. He was a war correspondent in Kabul, Afghanistan. He collaborates with La Stampa and All Music Italia. In 2015 he edited the literary series "Le due anime" for Rupe Mutevole's publishing house.

In 2001 he resumed songwriting for artists such as Tom Waits, Leonard Cohen, Joaquín Sabina, Suzanne Vega, Roberto Vecchioni, Paola Turci, Mango, Francesco Baccini, Mietta, Marco Carta. Among his most famous concerts in 1979 with Peter Hammill of Van der Graaf Generator at the Palalido in Milan. In 2009 he won the iTunes Rewind version 1 as the first Italian artist with the album Men wrong (Emi Penthar-Mizar) fronting for U2 and Michael Jackson.

== Recognition ==
- Critics' Award at the Club Tenco (2003) with Roberto Vecchioni
- iTunes Rewind version 1 (2009)
- Top Ten iTunes Rewind ranking (2010): second place with Il serpente tonto (Emi Penthar-Mizar), in sixth place with Hotel Costarica 1983 (Warner).
- Second gold record.
- Simon Bolivar prize (2016)
- Friend of the Roma People Award
- International Phralipe Award

== Legacy ==
On the evening of 1 August 2018 he was attacked by two people near his home in Milan.

Nascimbeni died on 11 June 2019, aged 59.
