= Ivan Maksimović =

Serbian musician (1962–2019)

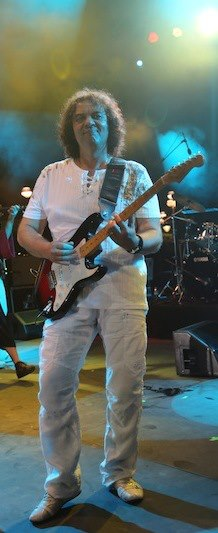
- Ivica Maksimovic playing with the No Smoking Orchestra

Background information
- Also known as: Ivica
- Born: 12 August 1962; Svetozarevo, SFR Yugoslavia
- Died: 7 November 2019 (aged 57) Jagodina, Serbia
- Genres: Ethnic Serbian music, Serbian folk music, hard rock
- Occupations: Guitarist, musician, songwriter
- Instruments: Guitar, bouzuki
- Years active: 1970–2019
- Website: tnso.net

Ivan 'Ivica' Maksimović (12 August 1962 – 7 November 2019) was a Serbian rock, Balkan ethnic, folk and pop guitarist. He was also a composer, arranger songwriter and actor. He played in the Yugoslavian heavy metal band Metro, pop-folk band 'Ljute papričice' and was a member of The No Smoking Orchestra. He was also active in several other side projects with pop singers.

== Biography ==
Ivan Maksimović was born on 12 August 1962 in Jagodina, Serbia. Maksimović started to play guitar on 1971, inspired by the music of Deep Purple and Led Zeppelin. His first band was formed on 1972. He played with a lot of musicians, from the smallest clubs to the largest halls and stadiums. As a studio musician he recorded around 1500 records, tapes and CD's, although a precise number can not be determined. Maksimović also played other string instruments, such as bouzouki, tzouras, baglamas, saz and oud.

In 2003, he met the film director, guitar player and composer Emir Kusturica and started to play with him and Dr Nele Karajlić in their band The No Smoking Orchestra. He played guitar on the soundtrack for the movie Life is a Miracle (as a member of TNSO) and Promise me this (with Stribor Kusturica's band The Poisoners). Maksimović also portrayed the role of inspector Maksimovic in Emir Kusturica's film Promise me this. He also took part in a punk-opera called Time of Gypsies, made by Emir Kusturica, which he accompanied successfully in several cities in the world.

Maksimović died on 7 November 2019.

== Instruments ==
- '66. Melodija Hollow Body Jazz Guitar Archtop
- '69. Ei Melodija radio
- '75. Maya Stratocaster Guitar
- '75. HB Les Paul Custom Black Beauty Guitar
- '78. Gibson B 45 12th. String Acoustic Guitar
- '78. Gibson Les Paul Custom Bordeaux Guitar
- '76. Marshall JMP 1959 Supe r Lead 100 W Guitar Head Amp
- / Marshall / Celestion Guitar Box 4 x 12
- '69. Marshall Super Bass Amp
- '80. Peavey Renown 400 200 w 2 x 12 ’’ Combo Amp
- '78. Acoustic Combo 114 50 w 2 x 10 ’’ Amp
- '71. Fender Stratocaster F Series Guitar
- '74. Fender Stratocaster F Series guitar
- '78. Fender Stratocaster S 8 Series Guitar
- '81. Fender Stratocaster S 9 Series Guitar
- '72. Gibson Les Paul Custom White Beauty
- '81. Kramer Pacer Imperial Guitar
- ’83. Bouzouki Shargia
- ’82. Rocktron Multiplex Guitar Multi Effects Rackmount
- ’86. Hohner / Di 'Marzio Pickups Guitar
- '87. Ibanez JEM Steve Vai Signature Guitar
- ’88. Ibanez ’’Joe Satriani’’ Signature Guitar
- ’02. Boss ME 33 Guitar Processor
- '04. Vox Valvetronix Tone Lab S.E. Guitar Processor
- ’88. Paul Reed Smith ’’Steve Lukather’’ Signature Guitar
- ’11. Gibson Les Paul Custom Black Beauty China Guitar
- ’96. Fender Hot Rod De Luxe 40 w 1 x 12’’ Amp.
- '97. Fender Stratocaster ’’Tex Mex’’ ’’Jimmie Vaughan’’ Signature Guitar

== Music role models ==
- Jimmy Page
- Al Di Meola
- Ritchie Blackmore
- Radomir Mihailović Točak
- Michael Schenker
- Steve Lukather
- Joe Satriani
