= Rosa Morena =

Spanish singer (1941–2019)

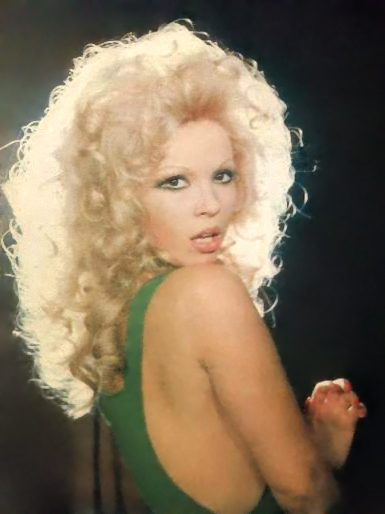
- Rosa Morena in 1973

Background information
- Born: Manuela Pulgarín González; 11 July 1941; Badajoz, Extremadura, Spain
- Died: 4 December 2019 (aged 78) Badajoz, Extremadura, Spain
- Genres: Flamenco pop
- Occupations: Singer; dancer; actress; model
- Instrument: Vocals
- Years active: 1949–2019
- Labels: Discos Belter; Columbia

Rosa Morena (11 July 1941 – 4 December 2019) was a Spanish flamenco pop star who achieved international fame during the 1970s disco era, with the song, "Échale guindas al pavo". Morena was born in Badajoz, Extremadura, Spain.

Her career began at the age of 8. When she was 12 she debuted in Madrid and at the age of 15 she began a tour through the stages of France, Belgium, Latin America and United States, where she acted with artists like Frank Sinatra, Ella Fitzgerald, Celia Cruz and Dean Martin. In New York City, she was considered by the critics as "The best artist in the City of Skyscrapers".

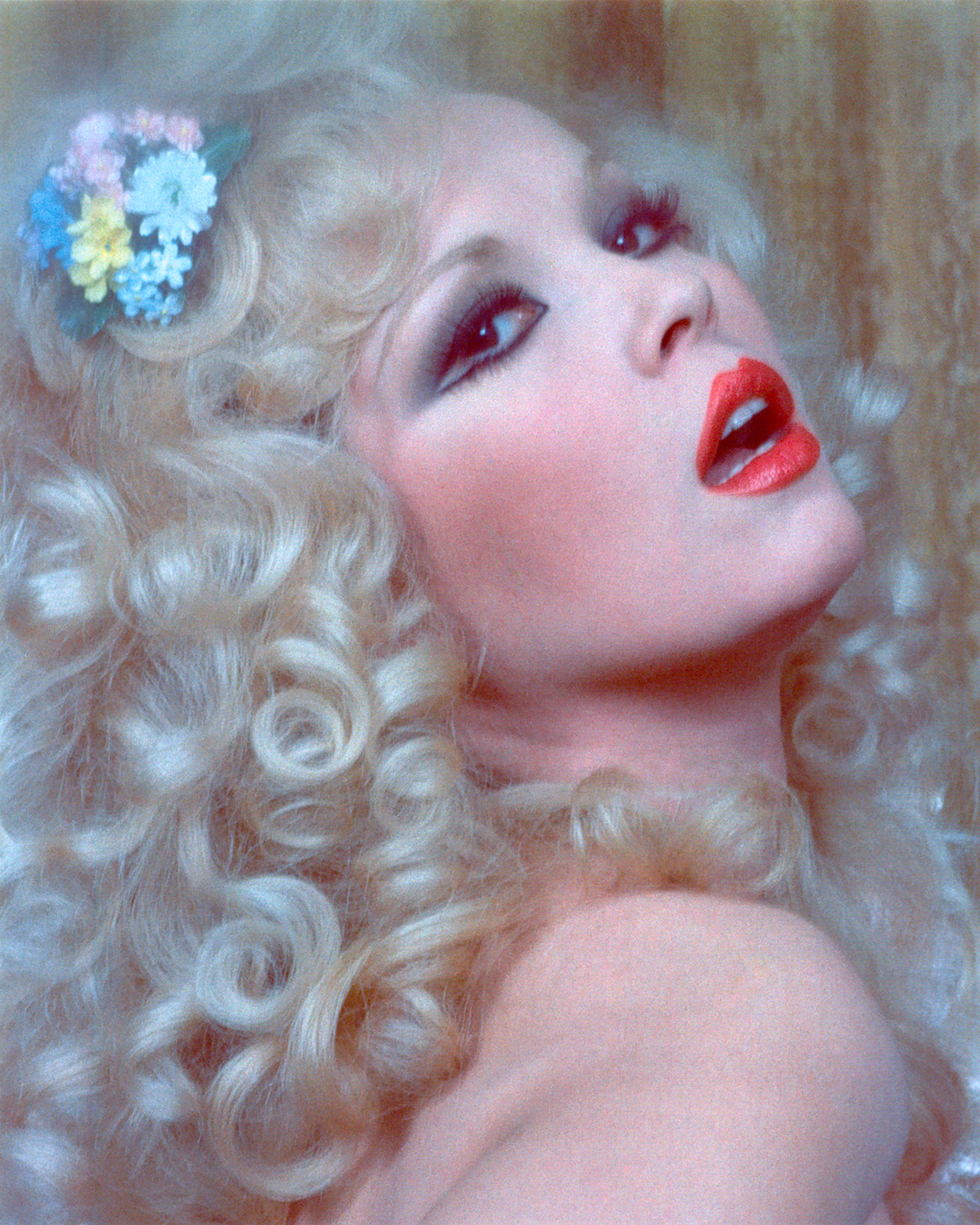
Rosa Morena, 1977

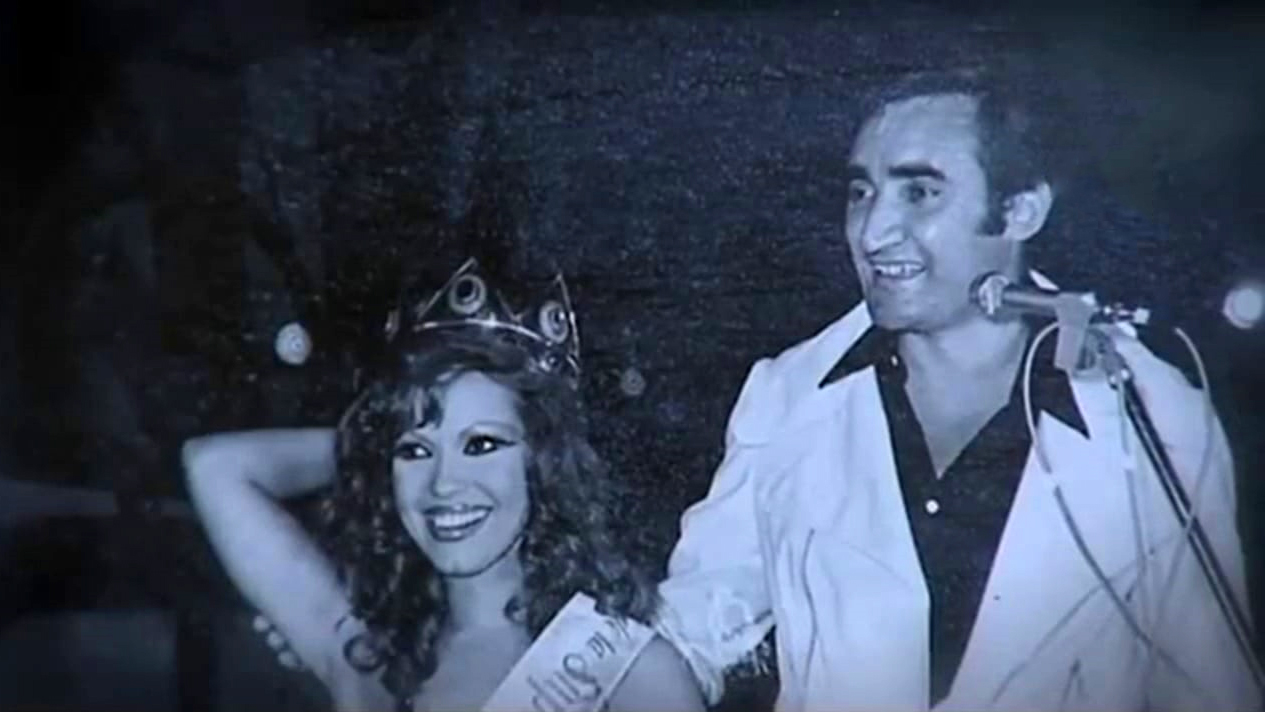
Rosa Morena at Festival de Montjuich, 1972

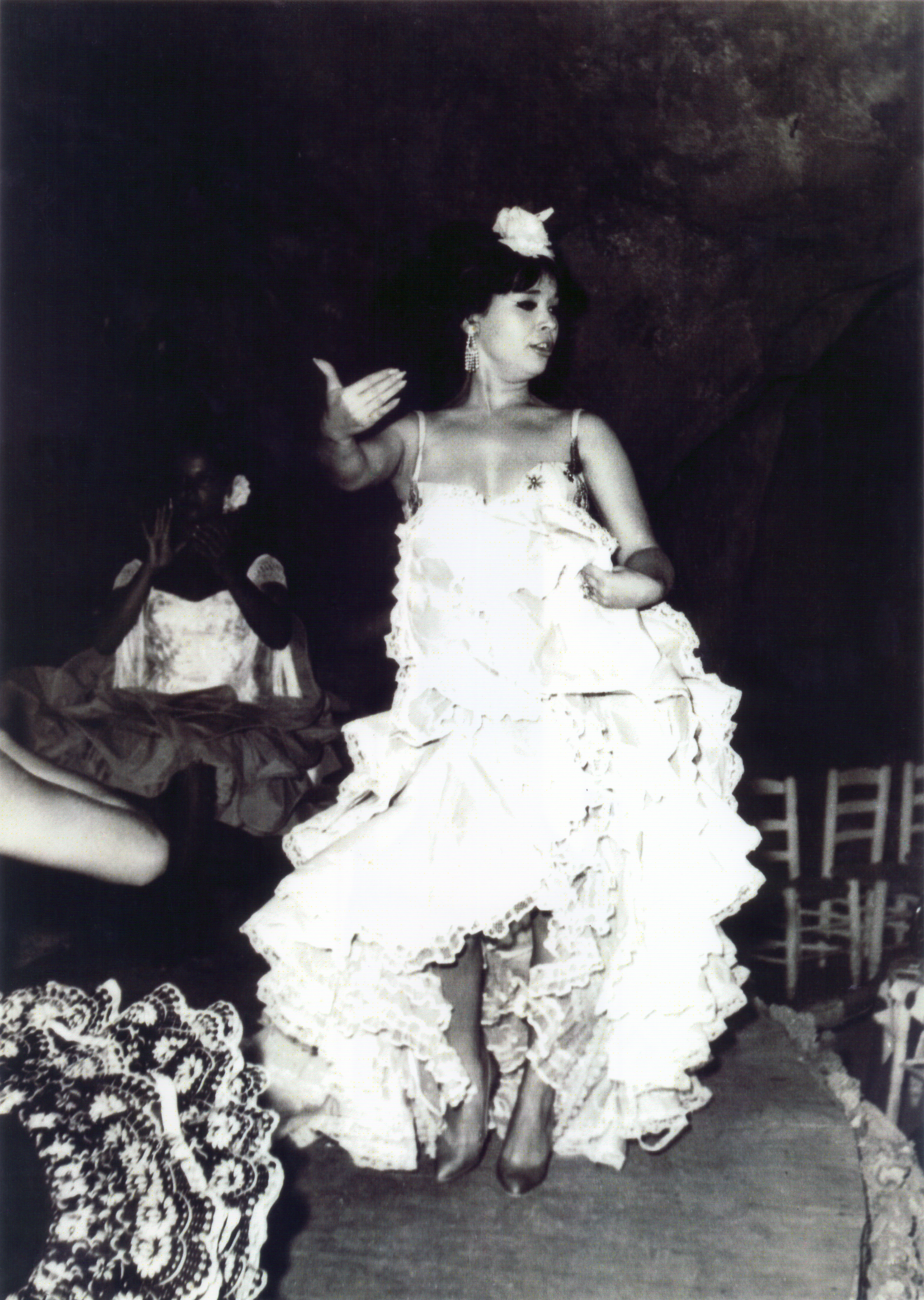
Rosa Morena in the 1960s

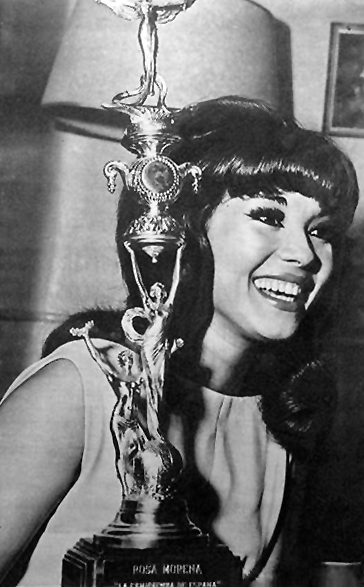
Rosa Morena receiving the New York Critics Award

== Filmography ==
- Alborada en cartagena: El secreto de las esmeraldas (1966), co-starring Julio Pérez Tabernero, Arturo Correa and Enrique Pontón, directed by Sebastián Almeida.
- Flor salvaje (1968), co-starring Luis Dávila, Antonio Prieto Puerto and Mónica Randall, directed by Javier Setó.
- Entre ríos y encinares (1971), documentary film directed by Julio Pérez Tabernero.
