= Rigor Mortis (band) =

American thrash metal band

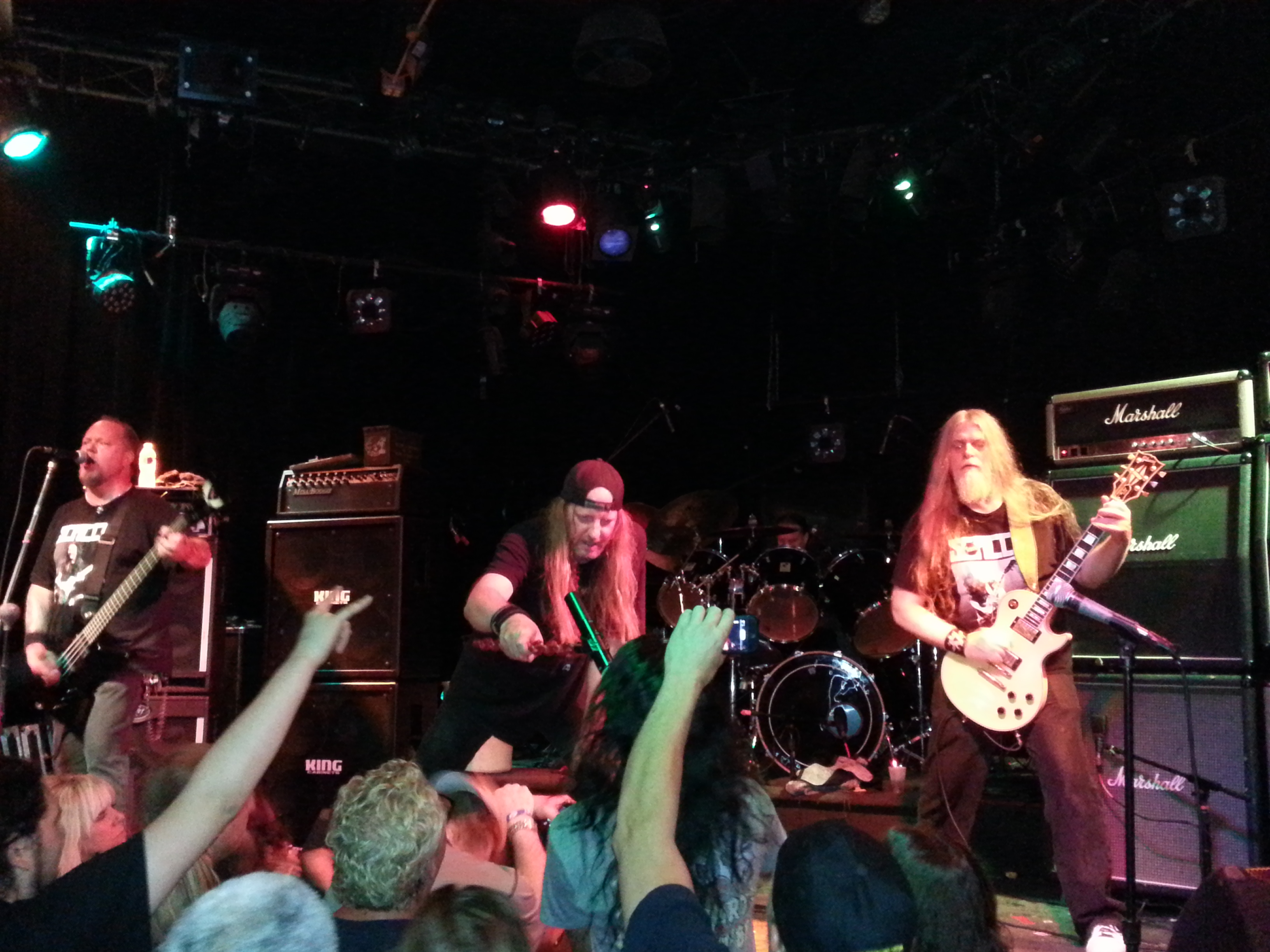
- Rigor Mortis in 2014

Background information
- Also known as: Wizards of Gore
- Origin: Dallas–Fort Worth, Texas, U.S.
- Genre: Thrash metal
- Years active: 1983–1991; 2005–2013
- Labels: Capitol; Triple X
- Past members: Harden Harrison; Casey Orr; Bruce Corbitt; Mike Scaccia; Doyle Bright

Rigor Mortis was an American thrash metal band that formed in November 1983 in the Dallas–Fort Worth, Texas metroplex.

== History ==
Schoolmates Harden Harrison (drums) and Casey Orr (bass) formed the band when they met Mike Scaccia (guitar). The three were interested in horror/gore films and heavy music. With singer Bruce Corbitt, they played death metal-adjacent thrash. They were one of a few major thrash bands from Texas, and helped create the local underground metal scene. The band signed to Capitol Records in 1987.

In 2005, the original lineup reunited and performed at Ozzfest 2008 in Texas. In 2009, Rigor Mortis played in Germany at the Keep It True Festival.

Scaccia played guitar with industrial metal band Ministry, Revolting Cocks, Lard, and others. Orr joined shock rock band Gwar as Beefcake the Mighty. Harrison became a member of metal bands Speedealer and Mitra. Corbitt sang for thrash metal band Warbeast (formerly Texas Metal Alliance). Former Rigor Mortis vocalist/guitarist Doyle Bright played guitar in metal band Hallows Eve. He currently performs vocals and guitars in the band SOG.

On December 23, 2012, Scaccia died from a heart attack while performing onstage.

On October 6, 2014, Rigor Mortis released their final album, Slaves to the Grave, recorded in February 2012 at Ministry's 13th Planet Studios in El Paso. Without label interest, Rigor Mortis crowdfunded the album with $22,838 from fan pre-orders to self-release the final album.

After years of battling with cancer, Corbitt died on January 25, 2019, at the age of 56. The remaining members perform Rigor Mortis music as Wizards of Gore to honor Scaccia.

== Musical style ==
The band made the transition from speed metal to thrash metal to death metal. The music on the self-titled debut album is described as technically demanding and "furiously fast". The lyrics mostly describe horror stories, inspired by films such as The Texas Chain Saw Massacre or A Nightmare on Elm Street. The band sees their songs as "little tales of death and doom, with the purpose of entertaining people". The EP Freaks featured Doyle Bright as the new singer, who "sounds exactly like his predecessor".

The band has explored lyrical themes such as demons and skinning.

== Select discography ==
- 1986: Demo 1986
- 1988: The Decline of the Western Civilization Part 2 (The Metal Years) Soundtrack (Capitol)
- 1988: Demons Demo
- 1988: Rigor Mortis (Capitol) - Released on July 19, 1988
- 1989: Freaks EP (Metal Blade)
- 1991: Rigor Mortis Vs. The Earth (Triple X)
- 1991: "Psycho Therapy" on Gabba Gabba Hey ‒ Ramones tribute album (Triple X)
- 2014: Slaves to the Grave
- 2018: Freaks Demo '89
