= 2019 in Icelandic music =

The following is a list of notable events and releases of the year 2019 in Icelandic music.

== Events ==
=== April ===
- 25 – The 7th Sonar Reykjavik festival start (April 25–27).

=== July ===
- 4 – The 20th Folk music festival of Siglufjörður starts in Siglufjörður (July 4–8).
- 10 – The 14th Eistnaflug festival starts in Neskaupstaður (July 10–13).

== See also ==
- 2019 in Iceland
- Music of Iceland
- Iceland in the Eurovision Song Contest 2019
