= Yukika =

- Gender: Female

Origin
- Origin: Japanese
- Meaning: Different meanings depending on the kanji used

Yukika (written: 來可 or 雪香) is a feminine Japanese given name. Notable people with the name include:

- Yukika Sohma (相馬 雪香; 1912–2008), Japanese scholar and the founder of the Association for Aid and Relief
- Yukika Teramoto (寺本 來可; born 1993), Japanese actress, singer, model and voice actress
