= Jacques Grimbert =

French conductor (1929–2019)

- Born: 10 May 1929
- Died: 17 December 2019 (aged 90)
- Occupation: Conductor

Jacques Grimbert (10 May 1929 – 17 December 2019) was a French conductor and choral conductor.

== Biography ==
After studying western concert flute at the Conservatoire de Lille, Grimbert integrated the Conservatoire de Paris, where Olivier Messiaen and Darius Milhaud were his teachers among others.

On 1964 Grimbert conducted the "La Faluche" students choir, during the 5th Zimriya, a Jewish international choir festival in Israel.

He was the founder of the Chœur et Orchestre de Paris Sorbonne in 1975, and was the artistic director of Musique en Sorbonne until 2008.

His multiple collaborations (Leonard Bernstein, Seiji Ozawa...) associated with his real desire to transmit to young artists gave rise to vocations, such as those of choral conductors Michel Laplénie, Laurence Equilbey, and Denis Rouger.

In February 2009, he was made a chevalier of the Légion d'honneur.

Grimbert died on 17 December 2019.
