= Dan Tshanda =

- Born: Daniel Nndivhiseni Tshanda; 28 January 1964; Chiawelo, Soweto, South Africa
- Origin: South Africa
- Died: January 5, 2019 (aged 54) South Africa
- Genres: Mbaqanga, Afropop, gospel
- Occupations: Musician, producer, businessman
- Years active: 1985–2019
- Labels: Gallo Records, Bula Records, Dalom Music Distributors cc

Daniel Ndivhiseni Tshanda (28 January 1964 – 5 January 2019), popularly known as Dan Tshanda, was a renowned South African disco musician, producer, and businessman. He is the founder and leader of the band Splash, which played a significant role in shaping the South African music landscape. Known for his contributions to genres such as mbaqanga, Afropop, and gospel, Tshanda's music transcended borders, earning him international acclaim.

== Early life and career ==
Tshanda was from the Venda tribe and was born in Tshiawelo, Soweto, South Africa. Due to financial constraints, he had to leave school at the primary level. To support his family, he worked as a newspaper vendor for a South African newspaper, where his father was employed as a sweeper. Later, he ventured into the taxi industry, working as a driver while pursuing his passion for music.

During this time, Tshanda formed a group called Flying Squad and recorded a demo cassette, which he submitted to Gallo Records. Although their first album, Mr Tony (1985), was not a commercial success, the late Hamilton Nzimande of Gallo Records gave the group a second chance. Renamed Splash, the band gained momentum after being mentored by Ray Phiri of Stimela, who recognized their talent and encouraged their rebranding.

== Personal life and death ==
Tshanda was from the Venda tribe but was a polyglot fluent in Tshivenda, Tswana, Zulu and English. He was married to Silvia Tshanda and he died on May 1, 2019, due to heart failure.

== Discography ==
- Peacock (1986)
- Snake (1987)
- Money (1988)
- Tshokotshoko (1989)
- Eye for an Eye (1990)
- Nesindande (1991)
- Khoma Khoma (1992)
- 1.5 (1993)
- Why (1994)
- Cellular (1995)
- Ndosala (1996)
- Double Face (1997)
- Crocodile (1998)
- Makhirikhiri (1999)
- Ndivhuwo (2001)
- Sethopha (2003)
- Silvia (2005)
- Springbok (2007)
- Tolovela (2009)
- Xewani (2011)
- Delele (2014)
- Shanduka (2019)

== See also ==
- Ray Phiri
- Splash (South African band)
