= 2019 in Philippine music =

The following is a list of notable events that are related to Philippine music in 2019.

== Events ==
=== May ===
- May 15 – The music video of "St4y Up", a collaboration song by Nadine Lustre was named Favorite Artist of the Year and Favorite Music Video at the Myx Music Awards 2019 held at the ABS-CBN Vertis Tent. Rivermaya, was this year's Myx Magna Awardee

=== July ===
- July 11 – Myx introduces the five new VJs of the channel, Dani Mortel, Anton Fausto, Aya Fernandez, Ylona Garcia and Edward Barber.
- July 28
  - Zephanie Dimaranan won the first season of Idol Philippines held at the Newport Performing Arts Theater, Resorts World Manila.
  - Aicelle Santos finished the 2nd placer at the ASEAN+3 Song Contest held in Vietnam. Tim Pavino also represented the Philippines in the singing competition.

=== August ===
- Coke Studio Philippines announced its lineup of contemporary and indie Filipino acts for Season 3, namely: Sarah Geronimo, UDD, Iñigo Pascual, This Band, Brisom, Janine Teñoso, Al James, Silent Sanctuary, Bea Lorenzo, St. Wolf, Ron Henley, Morissette, Lola Amour, Just Hush, and Clara Benin.

=== September ===
- September 9 – Filipino music icon Ryan Cayabyab and four other Asian trailblazers has officially receives the Ramon Magsaysay Award at the Cultural Center of the Philippines.
- September 28 – Elaine Duran from Butuan City was hailed as It's Showtime's Tawag ng Tanghalan Year 3 Grand Champion. It was held at Caloocan Sports Complex, Bagumbong, Caloocan.

=== October ===
- October 13 – "Mabagal", which was composed by Dan Tañedo and interpreted by Daniel Padilla and Moira dela Torre, wins Best Song at Himig Handog 2019.
- October 15 – Rock of Manila TV was officially soft launched on all cable TV and Digital providers in the Philippines. It is owned by the Rajah Broadcasting Network.

=== November ===
- November 3 – Vanjoss Bayaban, coached by Sarah Geronimo, won the fourth season of The Voice Kids, the grand finals of which were held at the Newport Performing Arts Theater, Resorts World Manila.
- November 9 – Ethel Booba of General Santos emerged as the first-ever Tawag ng Tanghalan Celebrity Grand Champion.

=== December ===
- Indie band Meryl won Amplified, Eastwood City's first-ever artist/band search.

== Debuts/disbanded ==
=== Soloist ===
- Joyce Pring
- KD Estrada
- Arvey De Vera
- Alex Bruce
- Bea Lorenzo
- Just Hush
- Nik Makino
- Michael Dutchi Libranda
- MRLD
- Zephanie

=== Duoist/bands/groups ===
- Good Kid$
- ALLMO$T
- ST. WOLF
- The Vowels They Orbit
- Nathan and Mercury
- Lola Amour
- Any Name's Okay
- COLN
- Sandiwa
- BRWN
- Flu
- Ysanygo

=== Reunion/comeback ===
- Trio
- Jensen Gomez
- Ciudad

== On hiatus ==
- Tom's Story

== Released in 2019 ==
The following albums were released in 2019 locally. Note: All soundtracks are not included in this list.

=== January ===
Date	Album	Artist(s)	Genre(s)	Label (s)	References
18	ClapClapClap!	IV of Spades	Rock, OPM	Warner Music Philippines	
22	Saint Elijah	Zelijah	Hip Hop, Rap	Independent	
29	Cebuana Persuasion	Karencitta	Pop, OPM	Viva Records	

=== February ===
Date	Album	Artist(s)	Genre(s)	Label (s)	References
11	Superhero	Jed Madela	Pop, OPM	Star Music	
22	Kept in Mind	Banna Harbera	Indie, Alternative	Warner Music Philippines	
22	Muses	Memphiis	Pop	MCA Music	

=== March ===
Date	Album	Artist(s)	Genre(s)	Label (s)	References
1	See Me	Kiana Valenciano	Pop	Warner Music Philippines	
8	Fatigue	Assembly Generals	OPM	Independent	
15	&	Gracenote	Alternative rock	Universal Records	
21	Queen of Soul	Jaya	OPM Ballad	Star Music	
22	Work in Progress	Billy Crawford	Pop	Viva Records	

=== April ===
Date	Album	Artist(s)	Genre(s)	Label (s)	References
11	365 Araw ng Eroplanong Papel	MNL48	J-pop, P-pop, ballad, OPM	Star Music	
26	Here's My Heart	Juris Fernandez	Pop	Star Music	
28	#M0806	Maymay Entrata	Pop	Star Music	
28	#E0806	Edward Barber	Pop	Star Music	

=== May ===
Date	Album	Artist(s)	Genre(s)	Label (s)	References
10	Sea of Lights	Sponge Cola	Rock, Pop	Universal Records	
12	Limasawa Street	Ben&Ben	Pop, OPM	Sony Music Philippines	
17	A Whole New World – From "Aladdin" (Single)	Morissette, Darren Espanto	Pop, soul, R&B	Walt Disney Records	

=== June ===
Date	Album	Artist(s)	Genre(s)	Label (s)	References
1	Fools and Foes	Fools and Foes	Indie, Post Rock	A Spur of the Moment Project	
2	Labyrinth (EP)	CRWN & August Wahh	Indie, electronic pop, R&B	Independent	
28	A Drop into the Blue	The Bloomfields	Pop	Independent	
28	Tigre (EP)	Barbie Almalbis	Pop	12 Stone Records	
19	AMGO	John Roa	Pop	Viva Records	
21	UDD	UDD	Alternative, indie pop	Terno Recordings	

=== July ===
Date	Album	Artist(s)	Genre(s)	Label (s)	References
26	Kulayan Natin	Munimuni	Pop	Marilag Records and Productions	
26	Ikaw ang Melody	MNL48	J-pop, P-pop	Star Music	
26	Go Up (single)	SB19	P-pop, EDM	ShowBT Entertainment	

=== August ===
Date	Album	Artist(s)	Genre(s)	Label (s)	References
30	Dream Awake	Quest	Hip Hop, Rap	Warner Music Philippines	

=== September ===
Date	Album	Artist(s)	Genre(s)	Label (s)	References
4	Evolution	Jake Zyrus	Pop	Star Music	
5	Vavy (EP)	VVS Collective	Rap/Pinoy hip hop	Def Jam Philippines	
20	Diyan Ba Sa Langit (Single)	Morissette, Jason Dy, KIKX	Indie pop	Star Music	
29	Iniwan Sa Kawalan (Single)	Morissette, ST. WOLF	Indie pop, alternative pop	Warner Music Philippines	

=== October ===
Date	Album	Artist(s)	Genre(s)	Label (s)	References
4	Four Sikatuna	Four Sikatuna	Pop	Curve Entertainment	
7	Binalewala	Michael Dutchi Libranda	Pop	Independent	
10	Papara (Single)	Morissette	Indie pop, alternative pop	Independent	Star Music
11	I Rose Up Slowly (EP)	Clara Benin	Indie pop		
11	Peklat Cream	Bita and the Botflies	Indie Rock, Alternative	O/C Records	
30	paradigm shift (EP)	half-lit	Indie pop, alternative pop	Independent	

=== November ===
Date	Album	Artist(s)	Genre(s)	Label (s)	References
2	Kundiman Ni Guitarman	RJ Jacinto	Pop, OPM	RJ Productions	
8	This is Christmas (Single)	Morissette	Pop	Sony Music Entertainment	
8	LOVELUSTLOSS (EP)	Good Kid$	Hip Hop, Rap	Mustard Music	
8	Almost Christmas (EP)	Gracenote	Pop	Universal Records	
15	Loveless (EP)	Fern.	Pop	Universal Records	
15	Making Friends	Rusty Machines	Indie, alternative	Wide Eyed Records Manila	
21	All I Feel and See (EP)	Any Name's Okay	Indie pop	Sony Music Philippines	
25	High Tension	MNL48	J-pop, P-pop	Star Music	
29	Press Play	Over October	Alternative	MCA Music	
29	Unmasked (EP)	Kyle Juliano	Pop	Universal Records	

=== December ===
Date	Album	Artist(s)	Genre(s)	Label (s)	References
5	Merry Christmas, Friend (EP)	Reese Lansangan	Indie Folk	Independent	
19	Baka Sakali (EP)	Kalye Teresa	Pop	Kalsada Records	
20	Miss Kita Kung Christmas (Single)	Morissette, ST. WOLF		Star Music	
20	Langit Mong Bughaw	December Avenue	Rock, Alternative	Tower of Doom	
25	Alab (Burning) single	SB19		Sony Music Philippines	

== Concerts and music festivals ==
=== Local artists ===
Date(s)	Artist(s)	Venue	City	Event / Tour	Ref(s)
January 31	PPop Generation	Music Museum	San Juan City	Boom Ganda!	
February 1	JM de Guzman	Music Museum	San Juan City	Love Goes On	
February 1	Katrina Velarde	New Frontier Theater	Quezon City	Sikat Ako	
February 9	Ely Buendia; The Itchyworms	Newport Performing Arts Theater	Pasay	Ely Buendia & The Itchyworms Greatest Hits	
February 13	Jon Santos	Newport Performing Arts Theater	Pasay	I Can Do-THIRTY! Da 30th Anniversary Show	
February 14	Martin Nievera; Lani Misalucha	PICC Plenary Hall	Pasay	Timeless Classics	
February 14	Ogie Alcasid	Newport Performing Arts Theater	Pasay	Master of Love	
February 14	Jamie Rivera; The Company	Music Museum	San Juan City	Jamie in Perfect CompanY	
February 15	Ai-Ai delas Alas; Marco Sison; Nonoy Zuñiga; Rey Valera	Newport Performing Arts Theater	Pasay	Hitmakers and Ai	
February 14, 15 & 16	Regine Velasquez; Vice Ganda	Smart Araneta Coliseum	Quezon City	The Songbird and the Song Horse	
March 1	Joey Generoso; Jinky Vidal; Jay Durias; Ice Seguerra; Juris Fernandez; Meds Marfil; Janine Tenoso	Smart Araneta Coliseum	Quezon City	Playlist: The Best of OPM	
March 16	Kuh Ledesma	Mall of Asia Arena	Pasay	3:16 The Promise	
March 30	Darren Espanto; Lani Misalucha; Jona Viray^{Note 1}	Smart Araneta Coliseum	Quezon City	The Aces	
April 3	Jaya	Newport Performing Arts Theater, Resorts World Manila	Pasay	At Her Finest: The 30th Anniversary Concert	
April 5	James Reid; Sam Concepcion; Billy Crawford	Smart Araneta Coliseum	Quezon City	The Cr3w	
April 6	MNL48	New Frontier Theater	Quezon City	MNL48 First Generation: Living the Dream Concert	
April 25	Kisses Delavin	Music Museum	San Juan City	A Life Full of Kisses	
May 4	Gerald Santos	The Theatre at Solaire	Parañaque City	The Homecoming Concert	
May 11	Ken Chan; Rita Daniela	Music Museum	San Juan City	My Special Love #BoBreyinConcert	
May 16	Zsa Zsa Padilla	Newport Performing Arts Theater, Resorts World Manila	Pasay	Totally Zsa Zsa!	
May 18	Gino Padilla; Jam Morales; Jett Pangan; Lou Bonnevie; Raymond Lauchengco	The Theatre at Solaire	Parañaque City	Into the 80's	
May 22	Erik Santos; Yeng Constantino	Newport Performing Arts Theater, Resorts World Manila	Pasay	Extraordinary	
May 24	Put3ska	Music Museum	San Juan City	Put3ska Grand Reunion Concert	
June 7	The Company; Joey Generoso	Music Museum	San Juan City	Party of 5	
June 15	Aegis	Winford Manila Resort & Casino	Manila	Aegis in Concert	
June 15	Juris Fernandez	Newport Performing Arts Theater, Resorts World Manila	Pasay	Juris	
June 28	Mikee Quintos; Anthony Rosaldo	Music Museum	San Juan City	Revelation	
June 29	Mayonnaise	Music Museum	San Juan City	Akalain Mo 'Yun	
July 6	Luke Mejares; Jinky Vidal	Music Museum	San Juan City	SoundTrip Sessions Vol. 1	
July 11–12	Ian Veneracion	Music Museum	San Juan City	IAN: In Color	
July 12	K Brosas; Angeline Quinto	Smart Araneta Coliseum	Quezon City	Angeline K 'To, Concert Namin 'To	
July 19	Sue Ramirez	Music Museum	San Juan City	Rock Chic	
July 23	Pilita Corrales; Imelda Papin; Celeste Legaspi; Claire dela Fuente; Eva Eugenio; Beverly Salviejo; Jaya; Rita Daniela	Music Museum	San Juan City	The Music of Rico J. Puno	
July 27	Fr. Larry Faraon; The Company; Randy Santiago; Alonzo Muhlach; Lance Javier; Oasis of Love Band	Music Museum	San Juan City	Music on the Rocks	
August 3	Rico Blanco; IV of Spades	Metrotent Convention Center	Pasig	Rico Blanco x IV of Spades Live in Concert	
August 9	Alisah Bonaobra; Juris Fernandez	The Music Hall at Metrowalk	Pasig	One Night Only	
August 30	Kim Chiu; Mark Bautista; Jun Polistico	Music Museum	San Juan City	The Young & The Legend	
August 30–31	Lea Salonga	Newport Performing Arts Theater, Resorts World Manila	Pasay	Perfect Ten	
August 31	Carlo Aquino	Music Museum	San Juan City	Liwanag in Concert	
August 31	Ryan Cayabyab	The Theatre at Solaire	Parañaque City	MaestroRy: A Tribute to Ryan Cayabyab	
August 31	Jex de Castro; Sitti Navarro	The Music Hall at Metrowalk	Pasig	Bossa and Ballads	
September 7	Mayonnaise	Music Museum	San Juan City	Akalain Mo 'Yun: Part 2	
September 13	Moira Dela Torre	Smart Araneta Coliseum	Quezon City	Braver Moira	
September 14	Bugoy Drilon; Daryl Ong	Newport Performing Arts Theater, Resorts World Manila	Pasay	BND: Best of the Nineties Decade	
October 1	Various Christian artists	Smart Araneta Coliseum	Quezon City	All for the One	
October 10	Ogie Alcasid; Rey Valera; Zsa Zsa Padilla; Karylle; Jed Madela; Randy Santiago; K Brosas; Karla Estrada	Newport Performing Arts Theater, Resorts World Manila	Pasay	Ogie and the Hurados	
October 6, 13 & 20	MNL48	Movie Stars Cafe (Teams MII & NIV) & TIU Theater (Team L)	Quezon City and Makati	MNL48 Team Concert: No to Oshi-hen!	
October 18	Sharon Cuneta; Regine Velasquez	Smart Araneta Coliseum	Quezon City	Iconic	
October 19	Chad Borja; Rannie Raymundo; Richard Reynoso; Renz Verano	Music Museum	San Juan City	The OPM Hitmen: Magkakaibigan	
November 8	Ronnie Liang	Music Museum	San Juan City	Ronnie Liang Love x Romance	
November 15	Fumiya Sankai	Music Museum	San Juan City	Fumiya: Amazing 'Di Ba?	
November 16	Neocolours	Music Museum	San Juan City	Neocolours.. The Reunion	
November 22	Betong Sumaya	Music Museum	San Juan City	Betong's Amazing Concert	
November 22	Candy Pangilinan; Giselle Sanchez; Kim Molina	Music Museum	San Juan City	Titas of Manila	
November 22	Jessica Sanchez	New Frontier Theater	Quezon City	In the Spotlight	
November 28	Zephanie	New Frontier Theater	Quezon City	Zephanie at the New Frontier Theater	
November 29	Katrina Velarde	New Frontier Theater	Quezon City	SiKAT i2!	
December 4	True Faith; Side A Freestyle; South Border	Newport Performing Arts Theater, Resorts World Manila	Pasay	Romantic Wednesdate	
December 14	Chad Borja; Rannie Raymundo; Richard Reynoso; Renz Verano	Music Museum	San Juan City	The OPM Hitmen Live in Concert: Music for Life	
December 21	Lea Salonga	Newport Performing Arts Theater, Resorts World Manila	Pasay	The Gift	
December 31	Martin Nievera and Pops Fernandez	Solaire Resort & Casino	Parañaque City	A Royal Affair	

Note 1. Jed Madela was originally planned to be part of the Visayas and Mindanao legs of the concert but later backed out due to scheduling conflicts with his Higher Than High tour.

=== International artists ===
Date(s)	Artist(s)	Venue	City	Event / Tour	Ref(s)
January 13	Lukas Graham	Eastwood Mall Open Park	Quezon City	Live in Manila	
January 18–19	Planetshakers; Planetboom	Smart Araneta Coliseum	Quezon City	Planetshakers Praise Party Featuring Planetboom & Planetshakers Conference Manila/Quezon City	
January 19	Seungri	Mall of Asia Arena	Pasay	The Seungri Show	
January 25	Momoland	Smart Araneta Coliseum	Quezon City	Fanmeeting in Manila	
January 26	Taking Back Sunday	New Frontier Theater	Quezon City	Live in Manila	
February 2	Blackpink	Mall of Asia Arena	Pasay	In Your Area World Tour	
February 14	Sergio Mendes	The Tent, Solaire Resort & Casino	Parañaque	A Valentine's Concert	
February 22	Josh Groban	Mall of Asia Arena	Pasay	Bridges Tour	
February 26	Kodaline	New Frontier Theater	Quezon City	Politics of Living Tour 2019	
March 5	Maroon 5	Mall of Asia Arena	Pasay	Red Pill Blues Tour	
March 10	Rita Ora	New Frontier Theater	Quezon City	Phoenix World Tour	
April 27	Park Bo-gum	Mall of Asia Arena	Pasay	Asia Tour	
May 1	Troye Sivan	Mall of Asia Arena	Pasay	The Bloom Tour	
May 8	Jason Mraz	Mall of Asia Arena	Pasay	Good Vibes Tour	
May 10	Daya	Xylo at the Palace, Uptown Bonifacio	Taguig	Live in Manila	
May 20	Lauv; Bülow	Smart Araneta Coliseum	Quezon City	Asia Tour	
May 21	Lauv; Bülow	Waterfront Hotel	Cebu	Asia Tour	
June 23	Boyzone	Mall of Asia Arena	Pasay	Thank You & Goodnight Tour 2019	
June 29	Twice	Mall of Asia Arena	Pasay	Twice World Tour 2019: Twicelights	
July 11	5 Seconds of Summer	New Frontier Theater	Quezon City	Just Woke Up in Manila	
July 13	Jesse McCartney	New Frontier Theater	Quezon City	Live in Manila	
July 23	Daniel Caesar	New Frontier Theater	Quezon City	Live in Manila	
July 23–25	LANY; Mabel (singer)	Mall of Asia Arena	Pasay	Malibu Nights Tour	
July 26	Bazzi	The Island at the Palace, Uptown Bonifacio	Taguig	Live in Manila	
July 27	Lee Sung-kyung	SM Skydome	Quezon City	Be Joyful: 1st Fanmeeting in Manila	
July 29-30	Westlife	Smart Araneta Coliseum	Quezon City	The Twenty Tour	
July 29	Russ	New Frontier Theater	Quezon City	Live in Manila	
August 22	Park Bo-gum	Mall of Asia Arena	Pasay	Be With You Tour	
August 24	Exo	New Frontier Theater	Pasay	Exo Planet 5 – Exploration	
August 25	GFriend	New Frontier Theater	Quezon City	Asia Tour	
August 31	NU'EST	Smart Araneta Coliseum	Quezon City	<Segno> in Manila	
September 6	Mike Shinoda; Don Broco	New Frontier Theater	Quezon City	Post Traumatic Tour	
September 11	The 1975; No Rome	Mall of Asia Arena	Pasay	Asia Tour	
September 14	The Maine	New Frontier Theater	Quezon City	You Are OK Tour	
October 9	Miguel	The Island at the Palace, Uptown Bonifacio	Taguig	Live at the Palace	
October 10	Shawn Mendes	Mall of Asia Arena	Pasay	The Tour	
October 23	Carly Rae Jepsen	New Frontier Theater	Quezon City	The Dedicated Tour	
October 26	Got7	Mall of Asia Arena	Pasay	Keep Spinning Tour	
October 28	Backstreet Boys	Mall of Asia Arena	Pasay	DNA World Tour	
November 6	Ella Mai	New Frontier Theater	Quezon City	The Debut Tour	
November 9	A1; O-Town	Mall of Asia Arena	Pasay	Playback Music Festival Presents: The Greatest Hits	
November 18	Why Don't We	New Frontier Theater	Quezon City	8 Letters Tour	
November 22	James Arthur	Alabang Town Center	Muntinlupa	Live at Ayala Malls	
November 23	James Arthur	Ayala Malls Vertis North	Quezon City	Live at Ayala Malls	
November 24	James Arthur	Ayala Malls Manila Bay	Parañaque	Live at Ayala Malls	
November 30	Boy Pablo	New Frontier Theater	Quezon City	Asia Tour	
December 11	U2	Philippine Arena	Bocaue	The Joshua Tree Tour 2019	
December 12	Boyz II Men	Resorts World Manila	Pasay	Live in Manila	
December 13	IU	Smart Araneta Coliseum	Quezon City	<Love, Poem> Tour	
December 13	Oh Wonder	Eastwood City	Quezon City	Live in Manila	
December 14	Oh Wonder	Uptown Bonifacio	Taguig	Live in Manila	
December 15	Super Junior	Mall of Asia Arena	Pasay	Super Show 8	

=== Music festivals ===
Date(s)	Artist(s)	Venue	City	Festival	Ref(s)
March 1–2	120 OPM artists	Circuit Event Grounds	Makati	Rakrakan Festival: Peace, Love and Music	
March 1–2	IV of Spades; Anomalie; Ian Lofamia Band; Extrapolation; Robert Glasper; Danny Krivit; Ruby Ibarra; Laneous; I Belong to the Zoo; Munimuni; Coeli; Carousel Casualties; Lenses; The Ringmaster; The Blue Rats; Ena Mori; Dayaw	White Beach, Puerto Galera	Puerto Galera	Malasimbo Music and Arts Festival	
March 9–10	Two Door Cinema Club; The Kooks; Honne; Masego; Alina Baraz; Clairo; JMSN; SG Lewis; Mac Ayres; Prep; Sandwich; Unique; Reese Lansangan; Clara Benin; Autotelic; Charlie Lim; ADOY; Dayaw	Filinvest City Event Grounds	Muntinlupa	Wanderland Music and Arts Festival	
March 23	Various hard rock/heavy metal artists, including Slayer as headliner	Amoranto Sports Complex	Quezon City	PULP Summer Slam XIX	
April 6	Various artists and DJs	Circuit Event Grounds	Makati	Chroma Music Festival	
May 4–5	Various OPM artists	The Eye, Green Sun	Makati	Red Ninja Year 10 Fest	
May 18	Various international and OPM artists, including: Japanese Breakfast; Turnover; Last Dinosaurs; Phum Viphurit	Greenfield District	Mandaluyong	Summer Noise 2019	
June 9	Red Velvet; NCT 127; ELRIS; Kim Dong Han; Sohee	Mall of Asia Arena	Pasay	K-POP World Music Festival 2019	
June 21	Various artists	Makati		Fete de la Musique Philippines	
June 22	Various artists	Makati		Fete de la Musique Philippines	
June 28	Various artists	Intramuros	Manila	Fete de la Musique Philippines	
June 29	Various artists	Baguio, Batangas, Bulacan, Laguna, Palawan, and Pampanga		Fete de la Musique Philippines	
August 8-10	Planetshakers; Bethel Music; Austin Adamec; Lindsey Adamec; Miel San Marcos	Mall of Asia Arena	Pasay	Jesus Global Youth Day 2019	
October 26	Various OPM artists	Circuit Event Grounds	Makati	Jack TV Madfest 2019	
October 26	Abdel Aziz; Autotelic; Babyoliv; BP Valenzuela; Brass Pas Pas Pas Pas; Fern.; Flu; Jason Dhakal; Leanne and Naara; Miko Simangan; Quest; Reese Lansangan; Reggae Pickle Relish; TALA; Unique Salonga; Wagwan; Ysanygo	San Juan, La Union		La Union Surfing Break 2019	
November 22–24	Apartel; Ena Mori; One Click Straight; Cheats; Autotelic; Dante and Amigo (with the Lowkeys); She's Only Sixteen; Oh, Flamingo!; Deafheaven; Delta Sleep; M1LDL1FE; Cambio	Century City Mall	Makati	All of the Noise 2019	

=== Canceled/postponed dates ===
Date(s)	Artist(s)	Venue	City	Event / Tour	Ref(s)
February 25	Years & Years	New Frontier Theater	Quezon City	Palo Santo Tour	
April 9	Sabrina Carpenter	New Frontier Theater	Quezon City	The Singular Tour	
August 13	Chvrches	Smart Araneta Coliseum	Quezon City	Love Is Dead Asia Tour	
August 15	The Chainsmokers	Mall of Asia Arena	Pasay	World War Joy Tour	
October 2	Sting	Araneta Coliseum	Quezon City	My Songs Tour	

== Awarding ceremonies ==
- January 15 – Wish 107.5 Music Awards 2019, organized by Wish 107.5
- May 15 – Myx Music Awards 2019, organized by myx
- July 11 – MOR Pinoy Music Awards 2019, organized by MOR 101.9
- October 10 – 32nd Awit Awards, organized by the Philippine Association of the Record Industry

== Deaths ==
- January 16 – Brian Velasco, (b. 1977), drummer (Razorback).
- January 28 – Pepe Smith, (b. 1947), drummer and guitarist (Juan de la Cruz Band).
- March 5 – Annie Brazil, (born Justiniana Bulawin, 1933), jazz singer.
- March 31 – Ferdie Marquez, founding member of True Faith
