= Metro (Serbian band) =

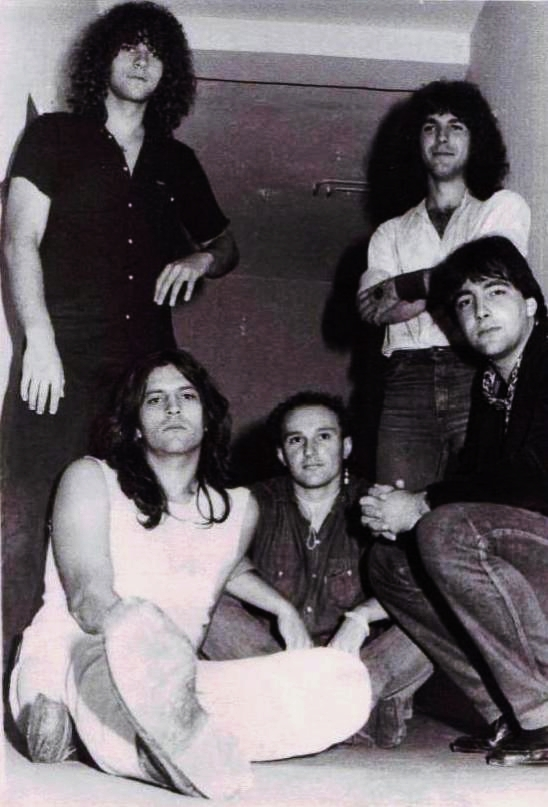
- The default Metro lineup

Background information
- Origin: Jagodina, Serbia
- Genres: Hard rock; heavy metal
- Years active: 1981–1985; 1994–1997; 2016–present
- Labels: PGP-RTB, ITMM
- Past members: Ivan Maksimović; Petar Maksimović; Saša Krstić; Zdravko Lalić; Branko Savić; Branislav Kaštevarac; Predrag Sazdanović; Nenad Jovanović; Saša Vučićević; Goran Ratković; Đorđe Ilić

Metro (Serbian Cyrillic: Метро) was a Serbian and Yugoslav hard rock band formed in Jagodina in 1981.

== Band history ==
Metro was formed in September 1981 in Jagodina, by brothers Ivan "Ivica" Maksimović (guitar) and Petar "Pera" Maksimović (bass guitar), and Branko "Brix" Savić (vocals). The default lineup also featured Zdravo Lalić (drums) and Saša Krstić (keyboards). Metro saw larger media attention after their performances at the 1982 Youth Festival in Subotica, on which they won the Audience's Choice Second Prize, and on the Belgrade Rock Festival.

In 1983, the band released their debut album, Čupave glave (Hairy Heads) through PGP-RTB. During the same year, the band performed as the opening act for Divlje Jagode on their tour across Serbia, and on 18 March 1983, they performed as the opening act for British heavy metal band Saxon on their concert in Belgrade Pionir Hall.

In May 1983, the Maksimović brothers and Lalić left the band, Savić continuing to lead the new Metro lineup, until May 1985, when the band broke up.

=== 1991-1997 ===
The band reunited July in 1991, with Savić on vocals and a new lineup. In 1995, the band released their second, more heavy metal-oriented album Eksplozija (Explosion), through ITMM. The band performed on all Gitarijada festivals held from 1993 to 1997 and frequently performed at motorcycle clubs' gatherings, until 1997, when it disbanded once more.

=== 2010–present ===
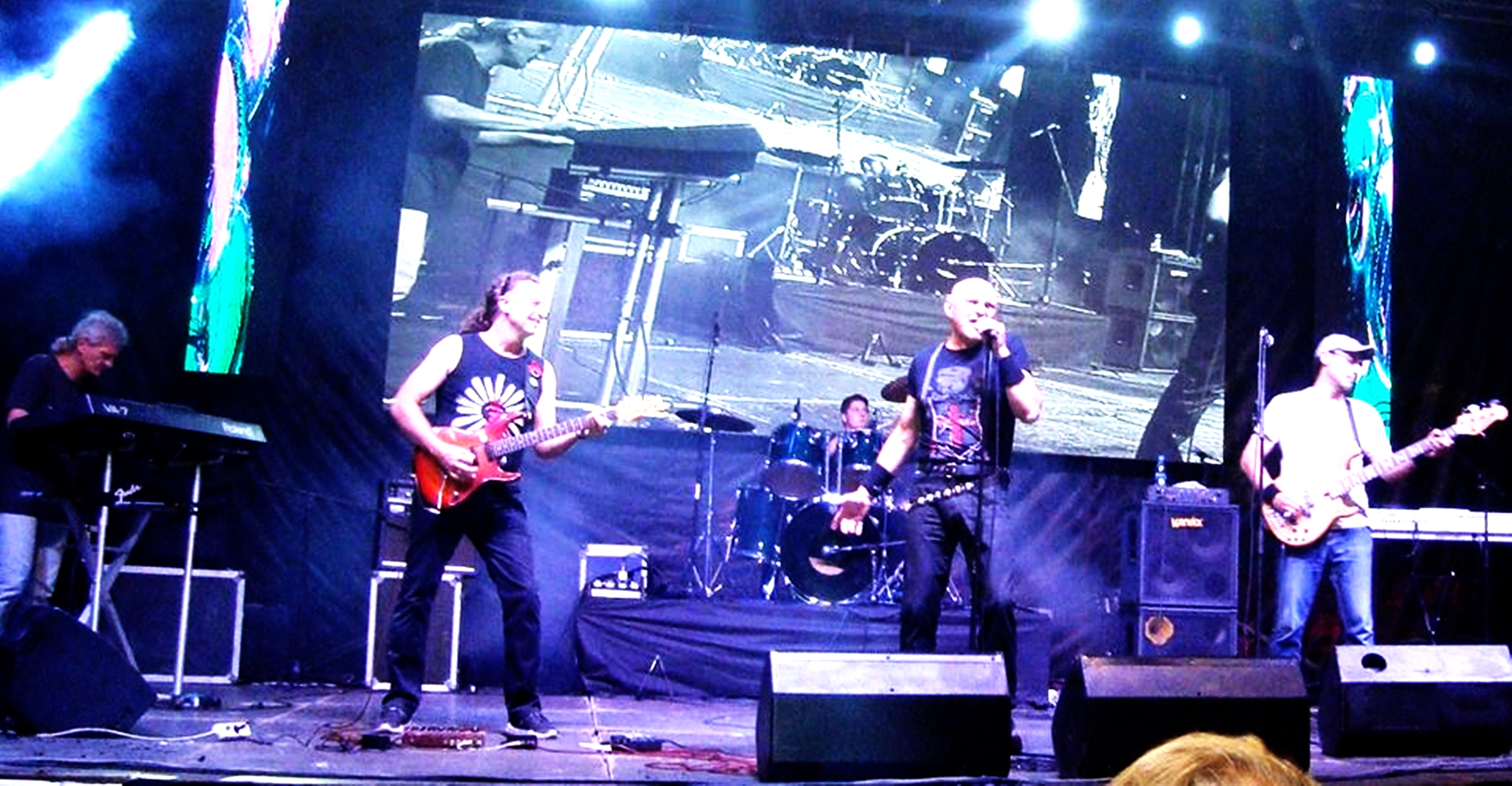
Metro performing in Paraćin in 2017

In early 2010, Branko Savić, Ivan Maksimović and Petar Maksimović recorded and released the song "Ona je kao zver" ("She's Like a Best").

In 2016, Savić reformed the band.

Petar Maksimovic died on 19 June 2014. Ivan Maksimović died on 8 November 2019.

== Discography ==
=== Studio albums ===
- Čupave glave (1983)
- Eksplozija (1995)

=== Singles ===
- "Ona je kao zver" (2010)
