= 2019 in Swedish music =

The following is a list of notable events and releases of the year 2019 in Swedish music.

== Events ==
=== March ===
- 22 – The Blue House Youth Jazz Festival started in Stockholm (March 22 – 24).

=== June ===
- 5 – The 26th Sweden Rock Festival starts in Norje (June 5 – 8).
- 13 – The Hultsfred Festival starts in Småland (June 13 – 15).

=== July ===
- 4 – The 20th Peace & Love Festival starts in Borlänge (July 4 – 6).
- 26 – The Norberg Festival opens (July 26 – 28).
- 27 – The Uppsala Reggae Festival starts (July 27 – 28).

=== August ===
- 1 – The Arvika Festival opens in Värmland (August 1 – 3).
- 2 – The Storsjöyran opens in Östersund (August 2 – 3).
- 8 – The Way Out West starts in Gothenburg (August 8 – 10).

=== October ===
- 25 – The 52nd Umeå Jazz Festival starts in Umeå (October 25 – 26).

== Albums released ==
=== January ===
Day	Album	Artist	Label	Notes	Ref.
11	Verkligheten	Soilwork	Nuclear Blast		

== Deaths ==
- 9 December - Marie Fredriksson, 61, Swedish singer-songwriter (Roxette)

== See also ==
- 2019 in Sweden
- Sweden in the Eurovision Song Contest 2019
- List of number-one singles and albums in Sweden (see 2018 section on page)
