= Bruce Corbitt =

American heavy metal vocalist (1962–2019)

- Born: Bruce Kendall Corbitt; December 22, 1962; Dallas, Texas, U.S.
- Died: January 25, 2019 (aged 56)
- Genre: Thrash metal
- Occupations: Singer; songwriter
- Years active: 1986–2017
- Labels: Capitol; Housecore
- Formerly of: Rigor Mortis; Warbeast; Wizards of Gore

Bruce Kendall Corbitt (December 22, 1962 – January 25, 2019) was an American heavy metal vocalist from Dallas, Texas, best known for alternately fronting the bands Rigor Mortis and Warbeast. His aggressive vocals were first showcased on Rigor Mortis' self-titled debut, which was released by Capitol Records in 1988. The album is regarded as a landmark of speed metal, and the band is one of the first of its type to have a major label release although it preceded by many early speed metal bands having major label leases such as Slayer.

== Biography ==
=== Rigor Mortis ===
After signing with Capitol Records, Rigor Mortis went on to tour North America and continued to terrorize the Dallas/Fort Worth metal underground. Violence and chaos followed the band wherever they performed, often involving room-clearing brawls. This culminated in Corbitt surviving being stabbed repeatedly at one of the band's concerts in 1987, mere days after their contract with the label had been finalized.

After departing Rigor Mortis in 1989, Corbitt remained mostly off the stage while still continuing to support other metal acts from the region. Rigor Mortis subsequently broke up in 1991, only to reform in 2005, again with Corbitt at the helm. They made several high-profile appearances, including Ozzfest in 2008 and their first international performance in Germany at The Keep It True Festival the following year.

The band recorded their final album (their second with Corbitt), called Slaves to the Grave, which was self-released by the band on their own Rigor Mortis Records imprint in 2014. This album unwittingly became a posthumous release for guitarist Mike Scaccia, who collapsed on stage and died of a heart attack in Fort Worth, Texas, while performing with the band on December 22, 2012, which also happened to be Corbitt's 50th birthday.

=== Warbeast ===
After successfully returning to the stage with Rigor Mortis, Corbitt joined forces with former members of thrash institution Gammacide to create Texas Metal Alliance in 2006, which was rechristened as Warbeast in 2009. The band subsequently saw four releases on Philip Anselmo's Housecore Records, including their debut album, Krush the Enemy, Destroy, and Enter the Arena. Warbeast has made multiple national touring appearances in support of notable acts including Gwar and Down.

=== Wizards of Gore ===
In 2014, the surviving members of the original Rigor Mortis lineup, which included Corbitt, along with bassist Casey Orr and drummer Harden Harrison, renamed themselves The Wizards of Gore and performed the Rigor Mortis material in tribute to Mike Scaccia. They made sporadic appearances in Texas, including the 2014 edition of the Housecore Horror Festival.

== Personal life ==
=== Illness and death ===
Corbitt was diagnosed with stage III esophageal cancer in May 2017. He underwent chemotherapy, but was placed in hospice care in January 2019 and died January 25 at age 56. Corbitt is the second member of Rigor Mortis to have died, following Mike Scaccia in December 2012.

== Influences and style ==
Corbitt's vocal approach was one that combined menace with an almost unsettling intelligibility. Unlike many extreme singers, he was known for clear delivery of even the most heinous of lyrics. His voice was reinforced by a number of visual trademarks, including ripped blue jeans, horror-themed shirts, and his demonic stare and accompanying "claw" hand pose. Corbitt was also known for his chainlink microphone stand, which was designed with a detachable top half to facilitate movement around the stage. Corbitt featured the stand in his respective bands, which was painted red for Rigor Mortis performances and subsequently chromed in the Warbeast era.

== Discography ==
=== Rigor Mortis ===
- 1986: Demo 1986
- 1988: Rigor Mortis
- 2014: Slaves to the Grave
- 2015: Welcome to Your Funeral (The Story of Rigor Mortis, Part 1) (DVD)
- 2018: The Original Unadulterated Freaks Demonstration Recordings

=== Warbeast ===
- 2010: Krush the Enemy
- 2013: War of the Gargantuas
- 2013: Destroy
- 2017: Enter the Arena
