= Jed Madela discography =

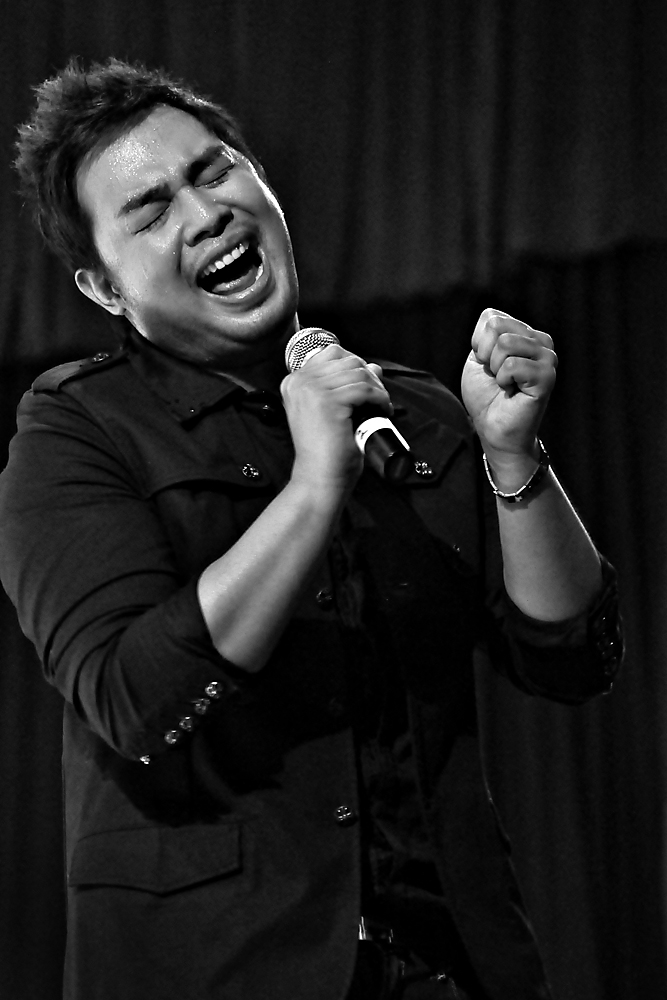
- Studio albums: 9
- Compilation albums: 3
- Singles: 22
- Music videos: 13
- Holiday albums: 1

This is a list of the albums and singles in the discography of Jed Madela.

== Albums ==
=== Studio albums ===
Year	Title	Sales	Certifications
2003	I'll Be Around: Label Universal Records; Released: January 6, 2003; Formats: CD, cassette; Number of Tracks: 10	PHI: -	PARI: -
2004	Songs Rediscovered: Label Universal Records; Released: October 11, 2004; Formats: CD, cassette; Number of Tracks: 17	PHI: 30,000+	PARI: 2× Platinum
2007	Only Human: Label Universal Records; Released: June 15, 2007; Formats: CD; Number of Tracks: 17	PHI: -	PARI: Platinum
2009	Songs Rediscovered 2: The Ultimate OPM Playlist: Label Universal Records; Released: February 27, 2009; Formats: CD; Number of Tracks: 16	PHI: -	PARI: Platinum
2010	The Classics Album: Label Universal Records; Released: September 1, 2010; Formats: CD; Number of Tracks: 16	PHI: 10,000+	PARI: Gold
2011	Breathe Again: Label Universal Records; Released: October 13, 2011; Formats: CD; Number of Tracks: 14	PHI: -	PARI: -
2013	All Original: Label Star Records; Released: February 25, 2013; Formats: CD; Number of Tracks: 12	PHI: -	PARI: -
2015	Iconic: Label Star Records; Released: May 25, 2015; Formats: CD; Number of Tracks: 15	PHI: -	PARI: -
2019	Superhero: Label Star Records; Released: February 8, 2019; Formats: CD; Number of Tracks: 10	PHI: -	PARI: -

=== Holiday albums ===
Year	Title	Sales	Certifications
2007	The Voice of Christmas: Label Universal Records; Released: October 29, 2007; Formats: CD; Number of Tracks: 13	PHI: -	PARI: Gold

=== Compilation albums ===
Year	Title	Sales	Certifications
2008	Let Me Love You (Collector's Edition): Label Universal Records; Released: 2008; Formats: AVCD; Number of Tracks: 8	PHI: -	PARI: -
2011	Between Us: Label Muzikon Malaysia; Released: 2011; Formats: CD; Number of Tracks:	PHI: -	PARI: -
2012	The Rediscovered Collection: Label Universal Records; Released: 2012; Formats: CD; Number of Tracks: 37	PHI: -	PARI: -

== Singles ==
=== As lead artist ===
Year	Single
2003	"Only Selfless Love" (with Karylle) "Let Me Love You (From the Bottom of My Heart)"
2004	"How Can I Fall?" "The Past"
2006	"I Believe in You" "Forever Blue"
2007	"Forevermore" "Iniibig Kita" "Whispering Your Name"
2009	"Give Me a Chance"
2010	"I Believe" "Times of Your Life"
2011	"Antara Kita" (theme song for Stanza Cinta, TV3) (with Nikki Palikat) "Breathe Again"
2012	"Ikaw Na Lang ang Kulang"
2013	"Ikaw Na" "Wish"
2015	"Welcome to My World" "You Mean the World to Me" "Beautiful"
2018	"'Di Matitinag" "Superhero"

== Other appearances ==
=== As performer in a tribute or compilation album ===
Year	Song	Album
2003	"Only Selfless Love" (with Karylle)	Only Selfless Love 2
2003	"Let There Be Peace on Earth"	Only Selfless Love 2
2006	"My Love"	Angelo Ortiz: A Love Affair
2006	"Ikaw Pa Rin"	Hotsilog: The ASAP Hotdog Compilation
2007	"Healing"	Kris Aquino: Songs of Love & Healing/Kris Aquino: My Heart's Journey
2007	"Remember Me This Way"	Kris Aquino: Love & Inspiration
2007	"Beautiful in My Eyes"	Kris Aquino: Love & Inspiration/Kris Aquino: My Heart's Journey
2008	"Until Then"	G25V: A Gary Valenciano All-Star Tribute Collection
2008	"I'm Your Angel"	Kris Aquino: The Greatest Love
2009	"The Impossible Dream"	A Memorial Tribute Soundtrack: Paalam, Maraming Salamat President Corazon C. Aquino/Only Human
2009	"Kaya Natin 'to"	Kaya Natin Ito!
2010	"To Where You Are"	Kris Aquino: The Blessings of Love/Kris Aquino: My Heart's Journey
2010	"I'll Be There for You" (I'll Be There OST)	i star 15 Anniversary Collection: The Best of Ballads & Love Songs
2011	"Biyahe Tayo"	Byahe Tayo!
2011	"Only Love"	Kris Aquino: My Heart's Journey/Only Human
2011	"Changes in My Life"	Kris Aquino: My Heart's Journey/Songs Rediscovered
2012	"Tanging Ikaw"	Ogie Alcasid: The Songwriter and the Hitmakers
2014	"If You Don't Want to Fall"	Himig Handog P-Pop Love Songs
2016	"I'll Be There" (with Darren Espanto)	Life Songs (MMK 25 commemorative album)
2017	"Maybe" (with Jona Viray)	Hey It's Me, Jamie (30th anniversary album)

=== As performer in a film ===
Year	Song title	Film title	Notes
2006	"Ikaw Na Lang ang Kulang"	All About Love	Cameo appearance
2006	"I Believe in You"	All About Love	Cameo appearance & played during film credits

=== As performer in television series ===
Year	Song title	TV Program	Channel
2009	"Kung Alam Mo Lang"	Nagsimula sa Puso	ABS-CBN
2009	"Star ng Pasko"	ABS-CBN Christmas station ID 2009	ABS-CBN
2010	"May Bukas Pa"	May Bukas Pa	ABS-CBN
2010	"Bagong Pilipinas"	The Aquino Inaugural: An ANC Special Coverage	ANC
2011	"Tayo ang TFC"	TFC station ID	TFC
2012	"Ikaw Lang ang Mamahalin"	Walang Hanggan	ABS-CBN
2012	"Kwento ng Pasko"	ABS-CBN Christmas station ID 2012	ABS-CBN
2013	"Dito Lang"	A Promise of a Thousand Days	ABS-CBN
2013	"Sinasamba Kita"	Muling Buksan ang Puso	ABS-CBN
2013	"Bukas Na Lang Kita Mamahalin"	Bukas Na Lang Kita Mamahalin	ABS-CBN
2014	"Magkaiba Man ang Ating Mundo"	Dyesebel	ABS-CBN
