= The Baskerville Hounds =

American garage rock band

The Baskerville Hounds are an American garage rock group from the West Park neighborhood of Cleveland, Ohio, United States. In October 1969, (not to be confused by the punk band Hound Baskerville) they had a single hit on the Billboard Hot 100: "Hold Me" which peaked at number 88 and was on the charts for two weeks.

The band was formed as the Majestics in 1963 by Doug McCutcheon – keyboards; Larry Meese – guitar; and John Kirkpatrick – drums. They brought in Bill Emery on bass in January 1964 and Dante Rossi – rhythm guitar in July 1964. They were renamed the Dantes, then the Tulu Babies, then finally the Baskerville Hounds.

Active from 1964 through 1972, the band became WHK radio's house band for major acts. In 1965, they released their first single, "Hurtin' Kind", written by Doug McCutcheon, backed with "Mine Forever", a Larry Meese original. Their instrumental “Space Rock Part 2” was featured as theme music on the Ghoulardi television show. They opened for The Rolling Stones, Sonny & Cher, Beach Boys, Dave Clark 5, and many other top acts. Mike Macron replaced John Kirkpatrick on drums after Kirkpatrick was drafted in 1966. Several other musicians joined the band for short periods of time because of military service: Jack Topper on Keyboards; Tom Evans on bass; and Wayne Hritz on guitar. Bobby Dillinger replaced Mike Macron on drums in the early 1970s and was in the reformed Hounds of the 1980s.

They made several TV appearances, The Big 5 Show and The Mike Douglas Show included. They have one movie soundtrack to their credit: "Hurtin' Kind", as the Tulu Babies, in the British-made crime thriller Gangster No. 1, starring Malcolm McDowell, Paul Bettany, and David Thewlis. Their recordings are regularly heard on classic rock radio stations.

The band had three chart singles, one album, one CD, plus many unreleased recordings. A second album was recorded in Florida at Criteria Studios in 1972. Due to financial difficulties at the time the album was never released and contains some of their best work, according to close friends of the band who were privileged to hear a copy of the acetate. As one of the acetates may have been lost, one of the guitarists has a copy, and there is a surviving copy on cassette. Another known copy was on 1/4" tape which was in possession of Dante Rossi and may still have been at the time of his death.

Dante Rossi (born October 4, 1941) died on July 2, 2019, at age 77.

Bobby Dillinger died on December 3, 2020, due to head and neck cancer.
