= Warbeast =

American metal band

Warbeast is an American thrash metal band. They released three albums and one split EP, all on Housecore Records.

Vocalist Bruce Corbitt, formerly of Rigor Mortis, died from cancer in 2019. In 2024, the band resurfaced under the moniker The Beast of War.

== Discography ==
- Krush the Enemy (2010)
- War of the Gargantuas (split with Philip H. Anselmo & the Illegals, 2013)
- Destroy (2013)
- Enter the Arena (2017)
