= 2019 in Irish music =

This is a summary of the year 2019 in Irish music.

== Events ==
- 4 January – Former Senator James Heffernan is convicted of the assault of three gardaí after an incident at the Indiependence music festival in County Cork during August 2016.
- 18 January – The members of The Cranberries receive honorary doctorates from the University of Limerick.
- 25 January – The Ulster Orchestra announces the appointment of Daniele Rustioni as its next chief conductor, effective September 2019.
- 31 January – The radio station RTÉ 2fm is renamed Larry Gogan FM for a day in honour of the retirement of the presenter, who is retiring after 40 years with the station.
- 28 February–3 March – The New Music Dublin Festival takes place.
- 7 June – In the British Queen's Birthday Honours, Feargal Sharkey is made an Officer of the Order of the British Empire.
- 25 June – A statue of folk musician Luke Kelly in Sheriff Street, Dublin, is vandalised with black paint. It is subsequently restored by specialists.

== Classical works ==
- Jennifer Walshe – The Site of the Investigation

== Albums ==
- Celtic Woman – The Magic of Christmas
- Westlife – Spectrum
- Swan Hennessy – Complete String Quartets and String Trio

== Deaths ==
- 7 February – Arthur Murphy, 90, singer and radio presenter
- 17 March – Bernie Tormé, 66, guitarist (Gillan, Guy McCoy Tormé, Atomic Rooster, Desperado)
- 22 April – Heather Harper, 88, opera singer
- 11 July – Brendan Grace, 68, comedian and singer (lung cancer)
- 6 August – Danny Doyle, 79, folk singer
- 19 September – Sandie Jones, 68, pop singer
- 28 September – Dessie O'Halloran, 79, folk fiddler and singer
- 18 December – Arty McGlynn, 75, folk guitarist (Patrick Street)

== See also ==
- 2019 in Ireland
