= Splash (South African band) =

South African band

- Origin: Soweto
- Genres: Soul; Folk; Pop
- Label: Gallo Record Company (former)
- Members: Albert Mthimkulu; Daniel Ndivhiseni Tshanda; Joseph Tshimange; Patrick Mthimkulu; Penual Kunene; Peter Leotlela

Splash were a Soweto township band of the 1980s and 1990s led by Dan Tshanda, lead vocalist and bass guitar.

== History ==
=== Formation and early years (1985–1991) ===
Born in Matangari, Venda, Dan Tshanda had to leave school at the primary level due to lack of funds in the family. Dan got a job as a newspaper vendor for an Afrikaans newspaper, where his father worked as a sweeper. When he became old enough to drive, he ventured into the taxi industry. While working as a taxi driver, he made a demo cassette, which was submitted to a record company, by then Dan had started a group known as Flying Squad.

In 1985, they released an album called MR TONY with Gallo Records. The album was not a success, but the late Hamilton Nzimande of Gallo Records gave them a second chance, and Dan continued under the name "Splash". Ray Phiri of Stimela agreed to feature them as their support act whenever they had shows, he later discovered that they had a great talent and decided they should change their names to SPLASH. This was the birth of a giant in South African music. In 1991 Dan Tshanda formed a group called Matshikos that was led by his two backing vocalists Penwell Kunene and Joseph Tshimange releasing an album, The Park Is Mine.

== Death ==
Tshanda died on 5 January 2019, aged 54, at a Johannesburg hospital from a heart attack.

== Discography ==
=== Studio albums ===
- Mr. Tony (1985)
- Peacock (1986)
- Snake (1987)
- Money (1988)
- Tshokotshoko (1989)
- Eye For An Eye (1990)
- Nesindande (1991)
- Khoma Khoma (1992)
- One Comma Five (1993)
- Why (1994)
- Cellular (1995)
- Ndosala (1996)
- Double Face (1997)
- Crocodile (1998)
- Makhirikhiri (1999)
- Ndivhuwo (2001)
- Sylvia (2005)
- Setlhopa (2003)
- Tolovela (2009)
- Time to Shine (2009)
- Delele (2014)
- Shanduka (2019)
