= Leo Iorga =

Romanian guitarist and singer (1964–2019)

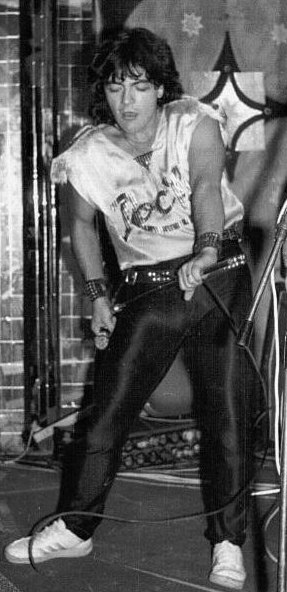

Background information
- Born: December 2, 1964; Arad, Romania, Socialist Republic of Romania
- Died: November 2, 2019 (aged 54) Bucharest, Romania
- Genres: rock guitar voice
- Occupation: Singing

== Biography ==
Iorga was born in Arad on 2 December 1964 and died on 2 November 2019, after eight years with lung cancer. He was 54 years old.

He started to play at the age of 14 as a drummer in the "Ioan Slavici" high school band. Until 1985 he collaborated with the group "Pacific". In 1988 he worked as a vocalist in the band Cargo releasing the hits "Brigadierii", "Povestiri din gară" and "Erata". From the autumn of 1988 to 1996 he was the vocalist of the band Compact in the composition: Leo Iorga, Adrian Ordean, Vlady Cnejevici, Teo Peter, Emil Laghia and Leluț Vasilescu, a band cataloged by Florian Pittiș and many others as the "golden formula of the Compact".

In 1989, with Leo Iorga as vocalist, the band Compact sang at the "Mitt Ein Ander" festival in Berlin. They have three tours in the Republic of Moldova (1988, 1990, 1992). In 1990 he participated in the "British Rock for Romania" tour with the bands Crazy Head, Jesus Jones and Skin Games. In 1992 he participated in the "Rock '92" festival, together with two famous names of world rock: Uriah Heep and Ian Gillan Band, and in 1993 he gave two concerts (in Brașov and Sofia) with the legendary band Nazareth. In 1994, he sang at the Skip Rock Festival with the famous group Jethro Tull. In 1993, 1994 and 1995 they took part in the Marlboro Music tour with Holograf, Iris and Direction 5.

From 1997 to 2001 he sang with Adrian Ordean, George Patranoiu, Mario Ticlea, Bobi Stoica, Anca Neacșu, Irina Nicolae, Paul Pampon Neacșu, Cătălin "Bibanu" Dalvarea and Andi Savastre in the band Schimbul 3.

From 2003 to 2019, he worked with the band Pacifica.

== Fight with the disease ==
In early 2011, Leo Iorga was diagnosed with lung cancer, after his health worsened, sometimes smoking even four packs of cigarettes a day. He had surgery in February 2011 to remove the tumour from the lungs.

On May 9, 2014, the artist underwent brain surgery, following the detection of a metastasis.
