= Art Sullivan =

Belgian singer (1950–2019)

- Art Sullivan in 1977

Background information
- Also known as: Art Sullivan
- Born: Marc Liénart van Lidth de Jeude; 22 November 1950; Brussels, Belgium
- Died: 27 December 2019 (aged 69)
- Years active: 1971–2019
- Labels: Carrère, Sirocco / Discodis, Disques Apollo, Barclay, Orlando, Philips/Phonogram, Polydor

Marc Liénart van Lidth de Jeude (22 November 1950 – 27 December 2019), known professionally as Art Sullivan, was a Belgian singer. He was successful in many countries, including Belgium, France, Portugal and Germany. Art Sullivan sold ten million records between 1972 and 1978. Compilations of his hits are still released.

He died from pancreatic cancer on 27 December 2019.

== Noble House Van Lidth de Jeude ==
The family members of the Noble House of Van Lidth de Jeude are living in Belgium and the Netherlands. The parents of Art Sullivan are Marie-José d'Udekem d'Acoz and Josse Liénart van Lidth de Jeude. His mother, daughter of Baron Guy d'Udekem is a distant relative of Queen Mathilde of Belgium; they have little contact.

== Discography ==
Singles released in France/Belgium include:

- "Ensemble" (Art Sullivan, Alain Termol) (1972)
- "Revoir" (Art Sullivan, Jacques Velt) (1972)
- "Adieu, Sois Heureuse" (Art Sullivan, Alain Termol) (1972)
- "Petite Fille aux Yeux Bleus" (Art Sullivan, Jacques Velt) (1973)
- "Une Larme d'Amour" (Art Sullivan, Jacques Velt) (1973)
- "Donne, Donne Moi" (Art Sullivan, Jacques Velt / arr.. Gabriel Yared) (1974)
- "Muy Juntos" (Art Sullivan, Jean Termol) (1974)
- "Un Océan de Caresses" (Art Sullivan, Sirna Velt, Claude Carrère, Jean Schmitt) (1975)
- "Viens Près de Moi" (Art Sullivan, Jacques Velt) (1975)
- "Petite Demoiselle" (Art Sullivan, Jacques Velt, Charles Dumolin) (1975)
- "Jenny (Lady)" (Art Sullivan, Jacques Velt, Charles Dumolin) (1975)
- "Appelle-la" (Art Sullivan, Jacques Velt) (1975)
- "Vivre d'Amour, Besoin d'Amour" (Art Sullivan, Jacques Velt) (1976)
- "Sur le Bord d'une Vie" (Art Sullivan, Jacques Velt) (1976)
- "Et Si Tu Pars" [Art Sullivan et Kiki] (Art Sullivan, Jacques Velt, Kiki van Oostindië, Will Hoebee) (1977)
- "C'est la Vie, C'est Jolie" (Art Sullivan, Jacques Velt) (1977)
- "Leana" (Art Sullivan, Jacques Velt) (1977)
- "Monsieur Tu, Madame Vous" (Art Sullivan, Jacques Velt, Charles Dumolin) (1977)
- "Fan Fan Fan" [Art Sullivan and the Cash Band] (Art Sullivan, Jacques Velt, M. Wittmann, Roland Liénart) (1978)
- "Qu'il Me Revienne" (Jean Termol) (1978)
- "Dame, Dame, Damélo" (Art Sullivan, Jacques Velt, Gabriel Yared) (1978)
- "Tu Minha Mãe" (Jacques Velt, Gabriel Yared) (1978)
- "L'Amour á la Française" [Art Sullivan & Kiki] (Art Sullivan, Jacques Velt, Kiki van Oostindië, Will Hoebee) (1979)
- "Determination" (Art Sullivan, Jacques Velt, Roland Lienart) (1979)
- "Tu Le Sais" (Art Sullivan, Jacques Velt, Roland Lienart) (1979)
- "Douce Comme l'Amour" (Art Sullivan, Jacques Velt, Gabriel Yared) (1979)
- "L'Amour á la Française" [Art Sullivan & Fernanda de Sousa] (1979)
- "Monsieur Chopin" (Jacques Denjean, Marie Renard) (1980)
- "T'en Aller" (Art Sullivan, Jacques Velt) (1981)
- "Les Temps Qui Passe" (Art Sullivan, Jacques Velt, Jacques Mercier) (1985)
- "Si Tu Veux" (Art Sullivan, Jacques Velt, Charles Dumolin) (1987)
- "Parle Moi de Toi" (Jan Keizer, Chrystian Caubergh, Thomas Tol) (1987)
- "Ode à Mathilde" (Art Sullivan, Gabriel Fauré) (2000)
- "Pré-Verre" (Jean Philippe Ruelle) (2002)
