= 2019 deaths in the United States (January–June) =

- Decades: 1990s; 2000s; 2010s; 2020s; 2030s
- See also: History of the United States (2016–present); Timeline of United States history (2010–present); List of years in the United States

Deaths in the first half of the year 2019 in the United States. For the last half of the year, see 2019 deaths in the United States, July–December.

== January ==
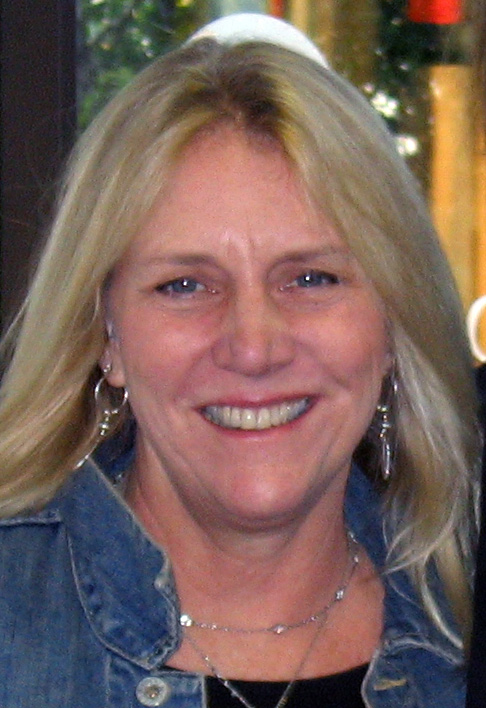
Pegi Young

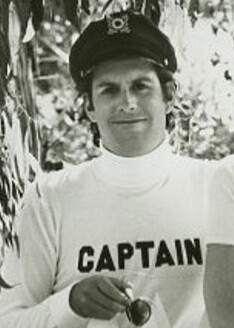
Daryl Dragon

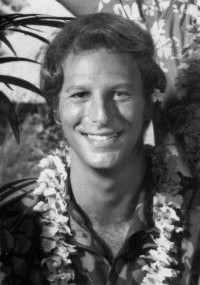
Bob Einstein

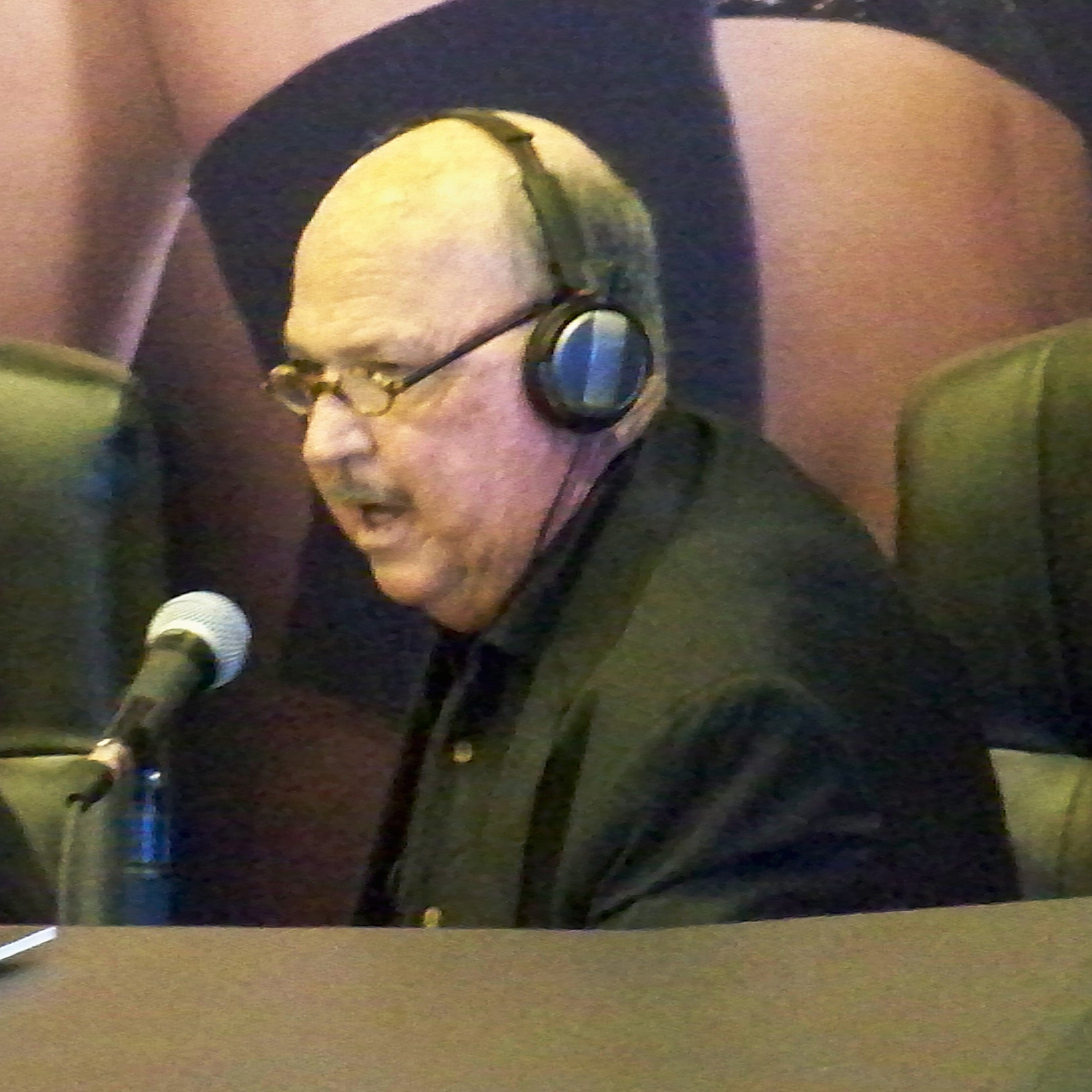
Gene Okerlund

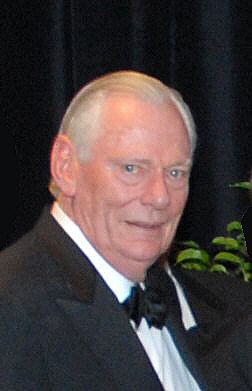
Herb Kelleher

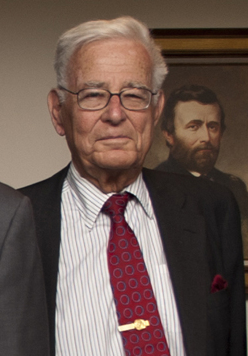
Harold Brown

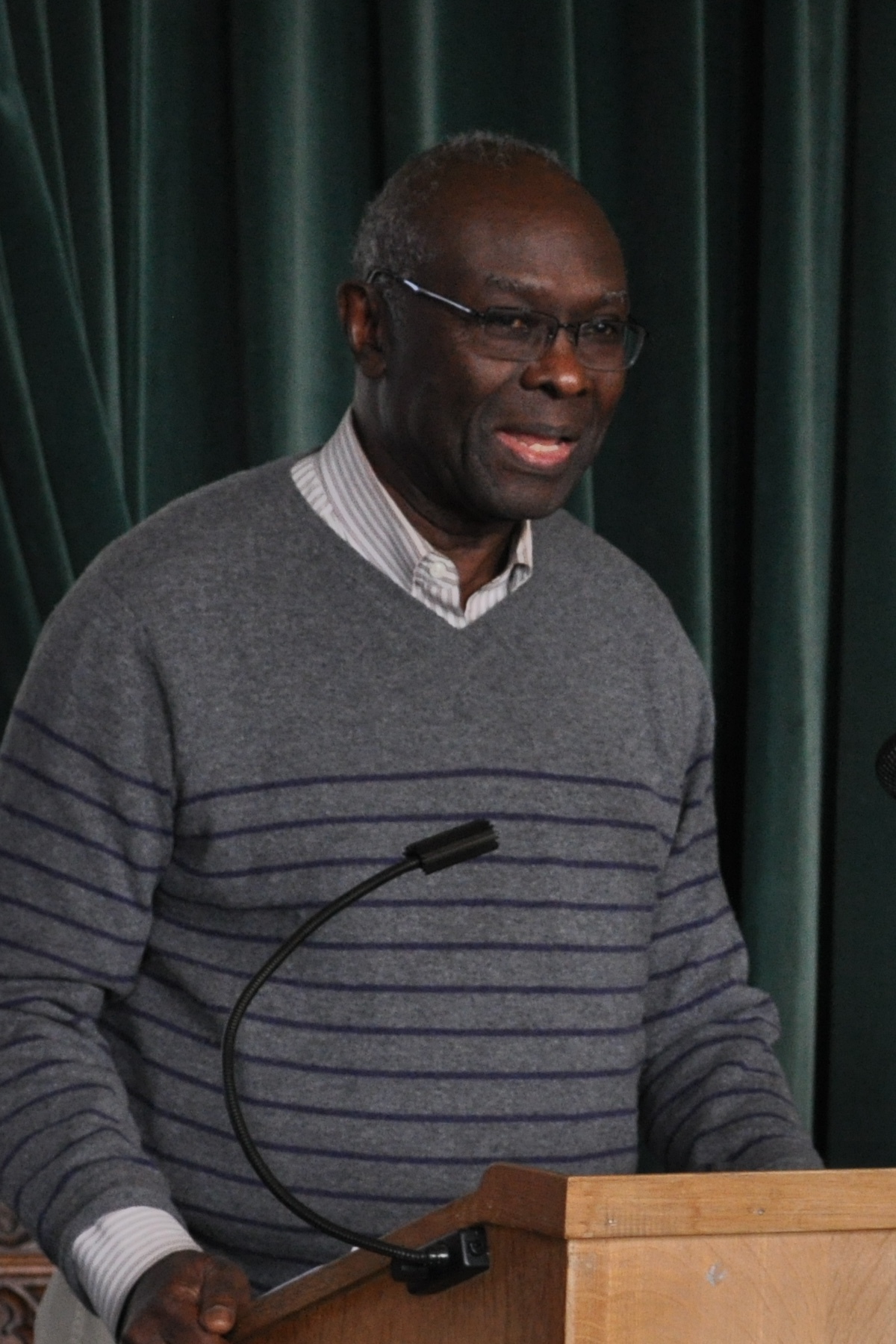
Lamin Sanneh

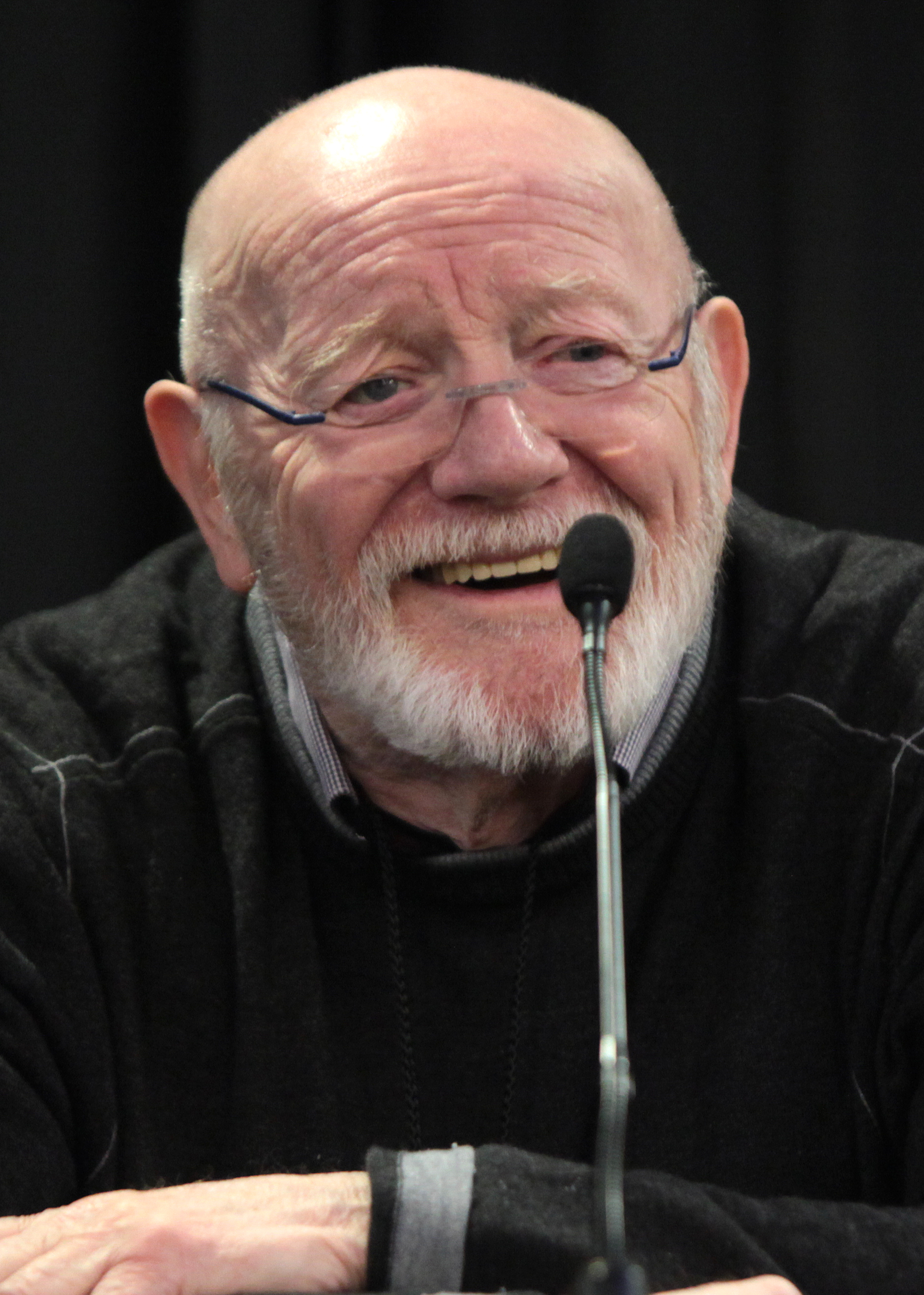
W. Morgan Sheppard

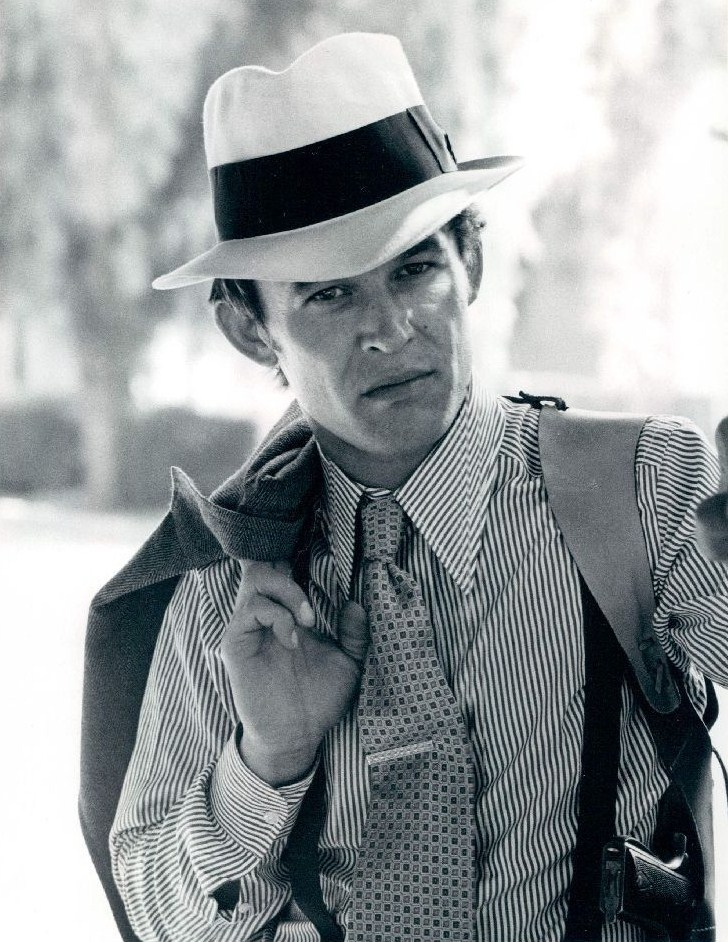
Paul Koslo

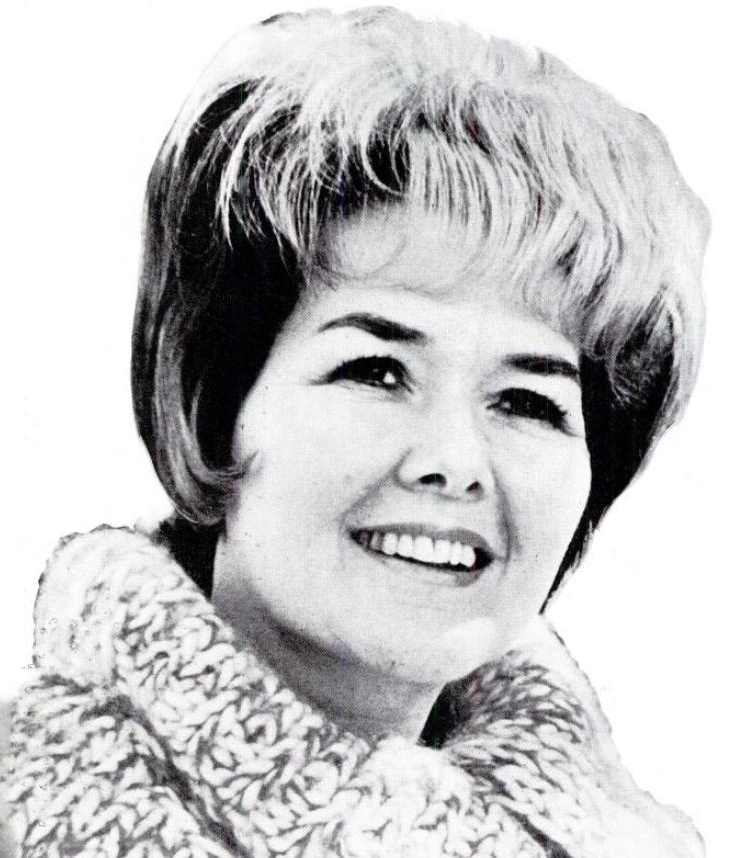
Bonnie Guitar

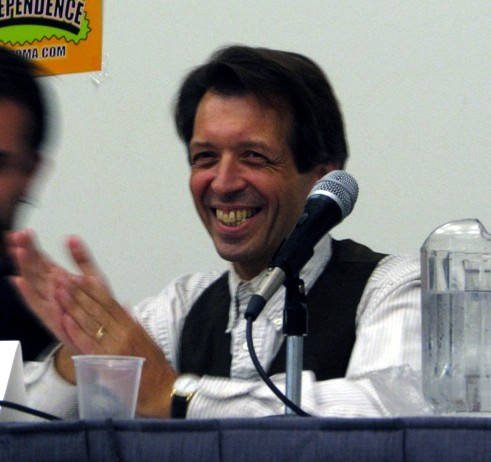
Batton Lash

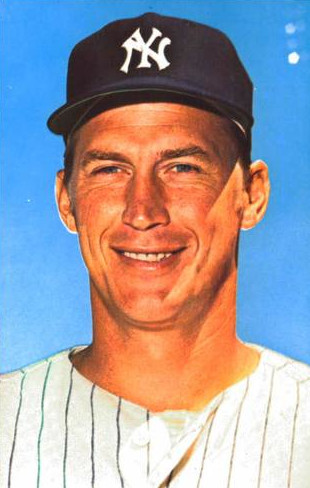
Mel Stottlemyre

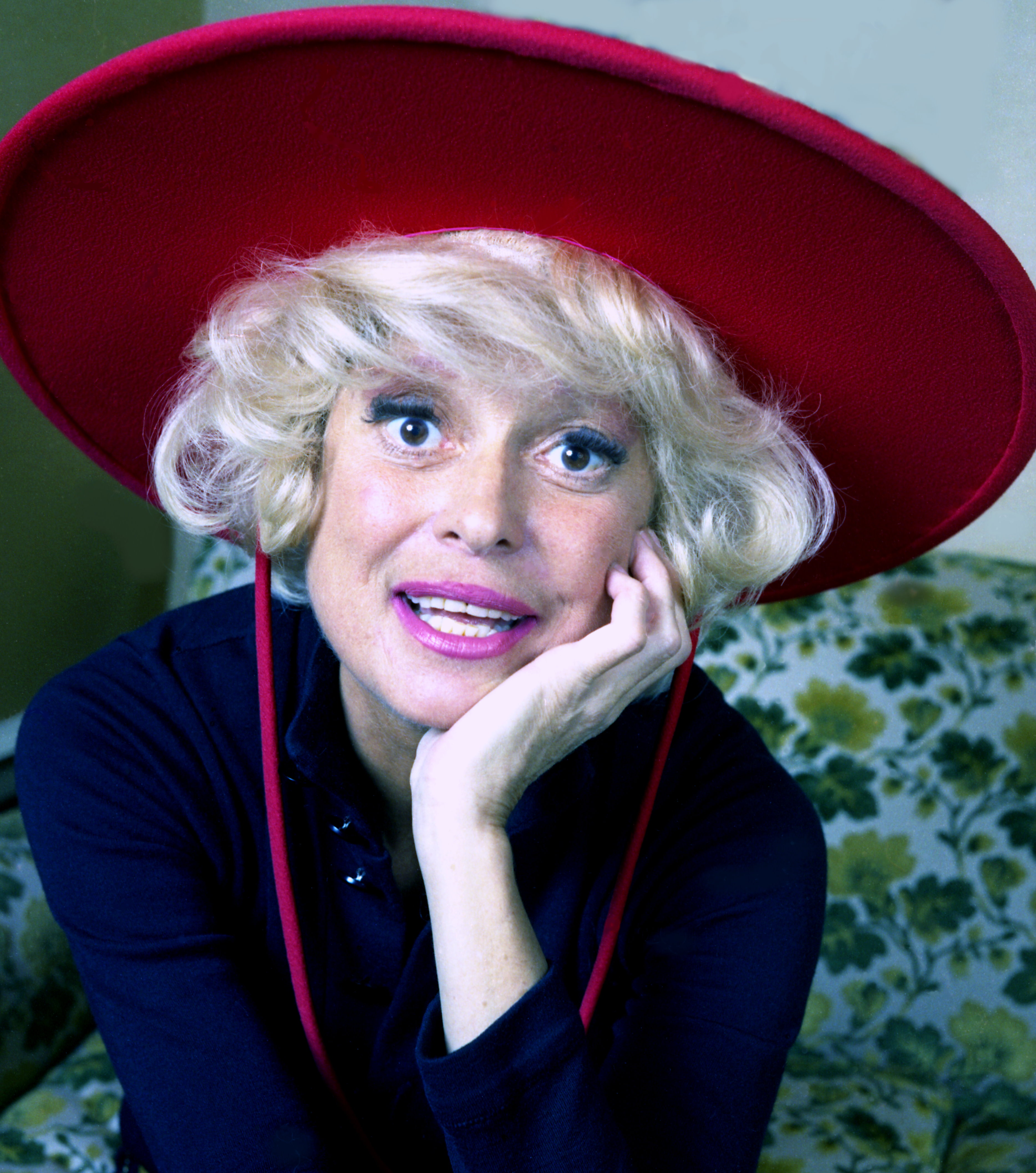
Carol Channing

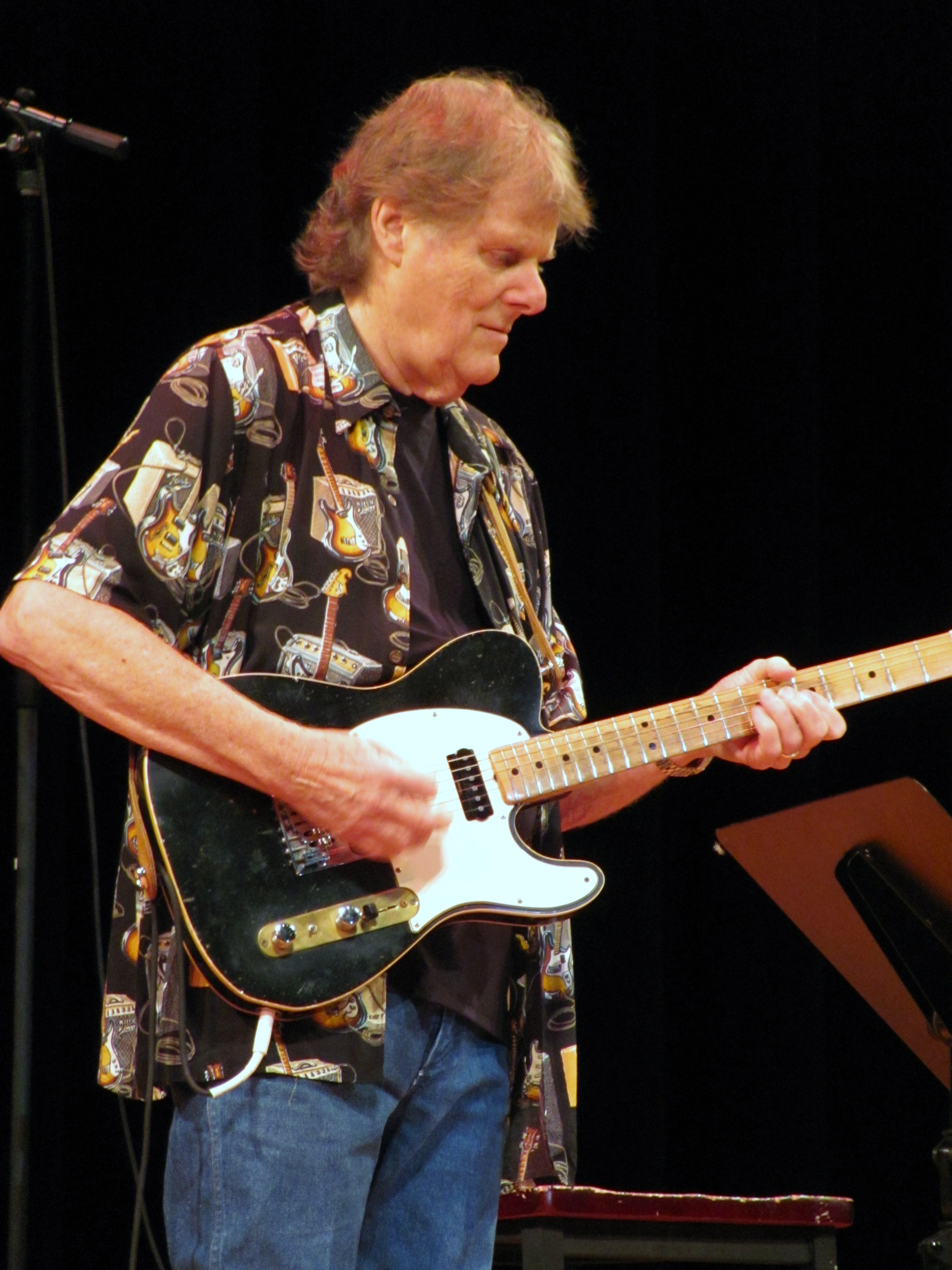
Reggie Young

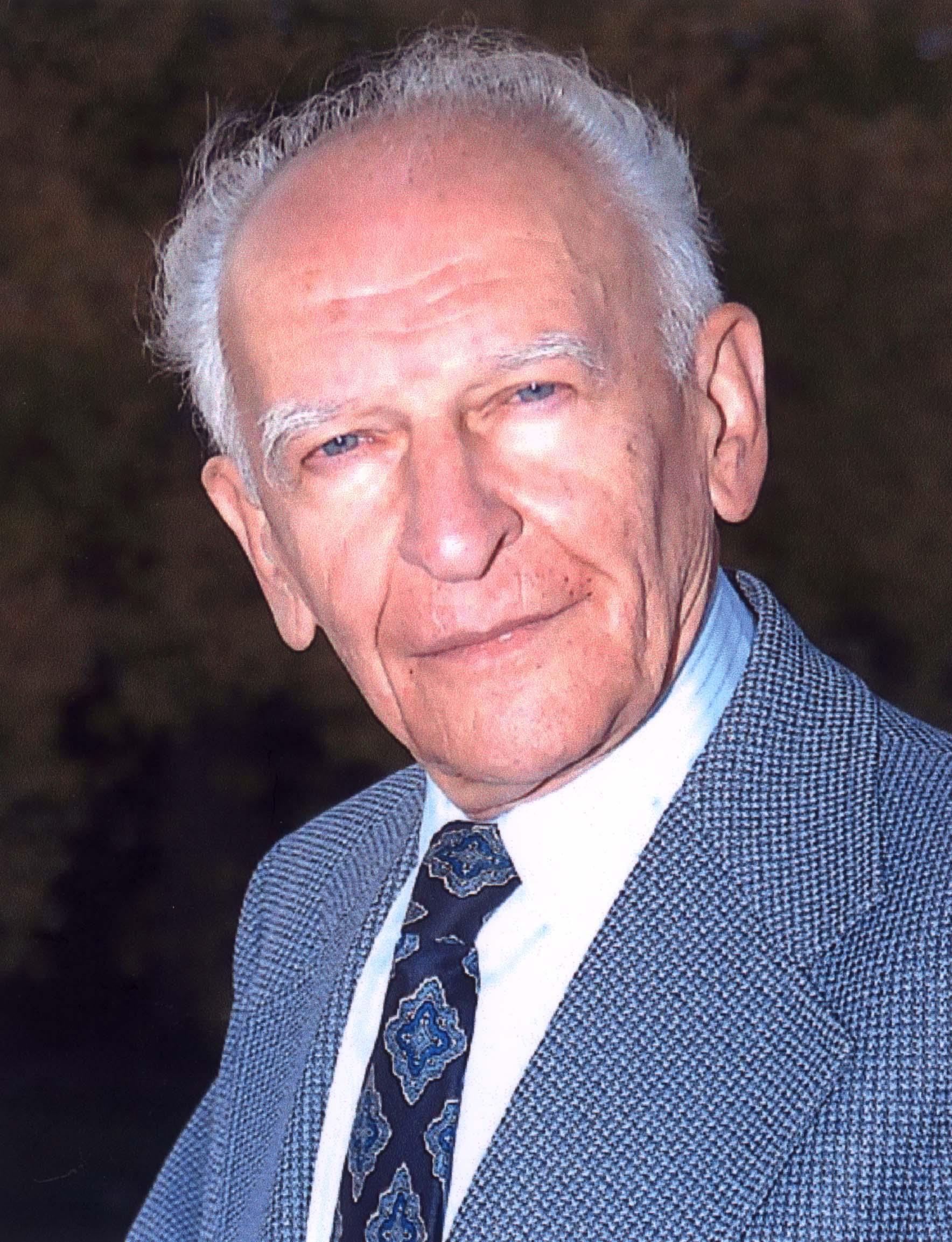
Tibor Baranski

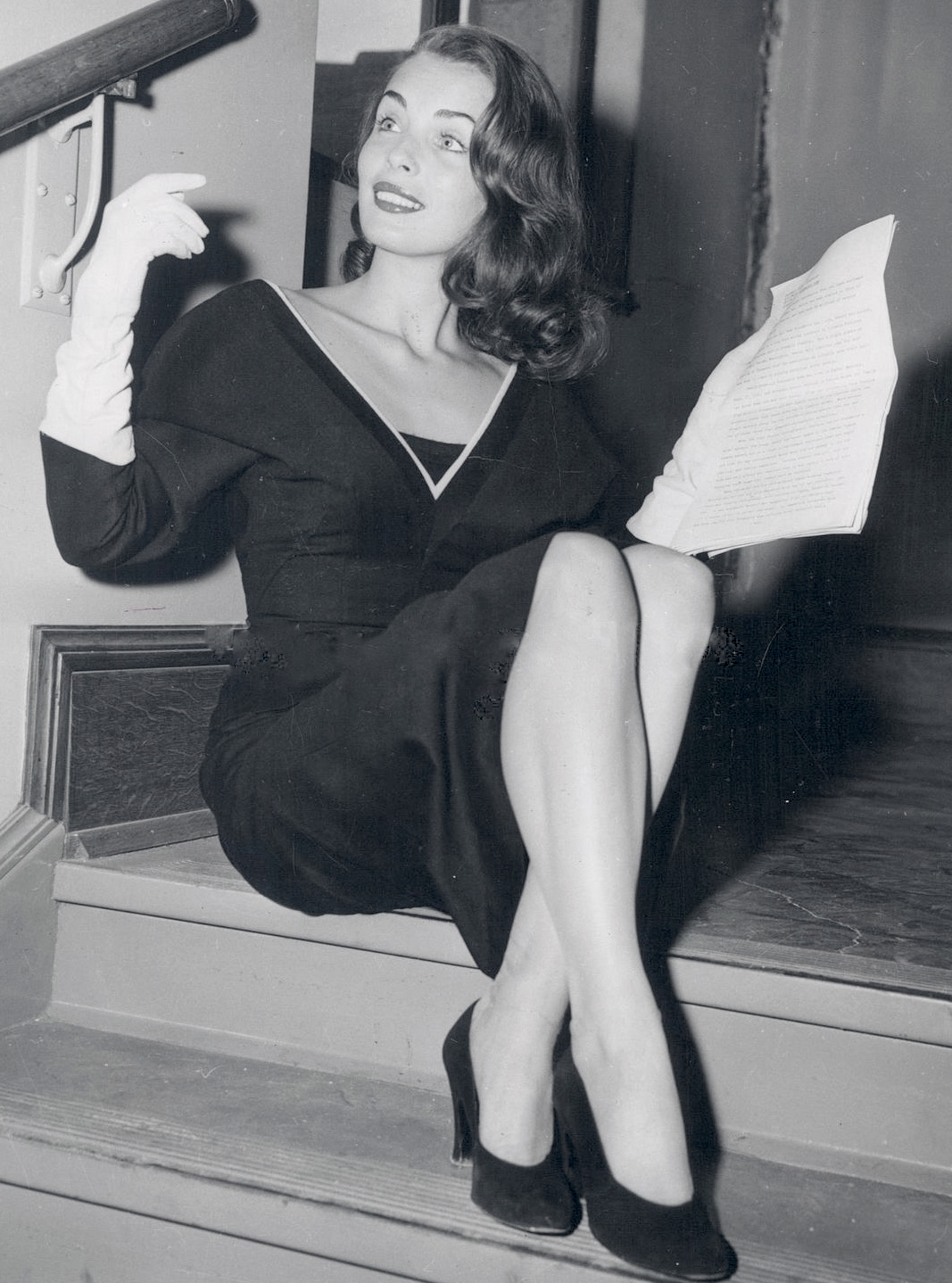
Rosemarie Bowe

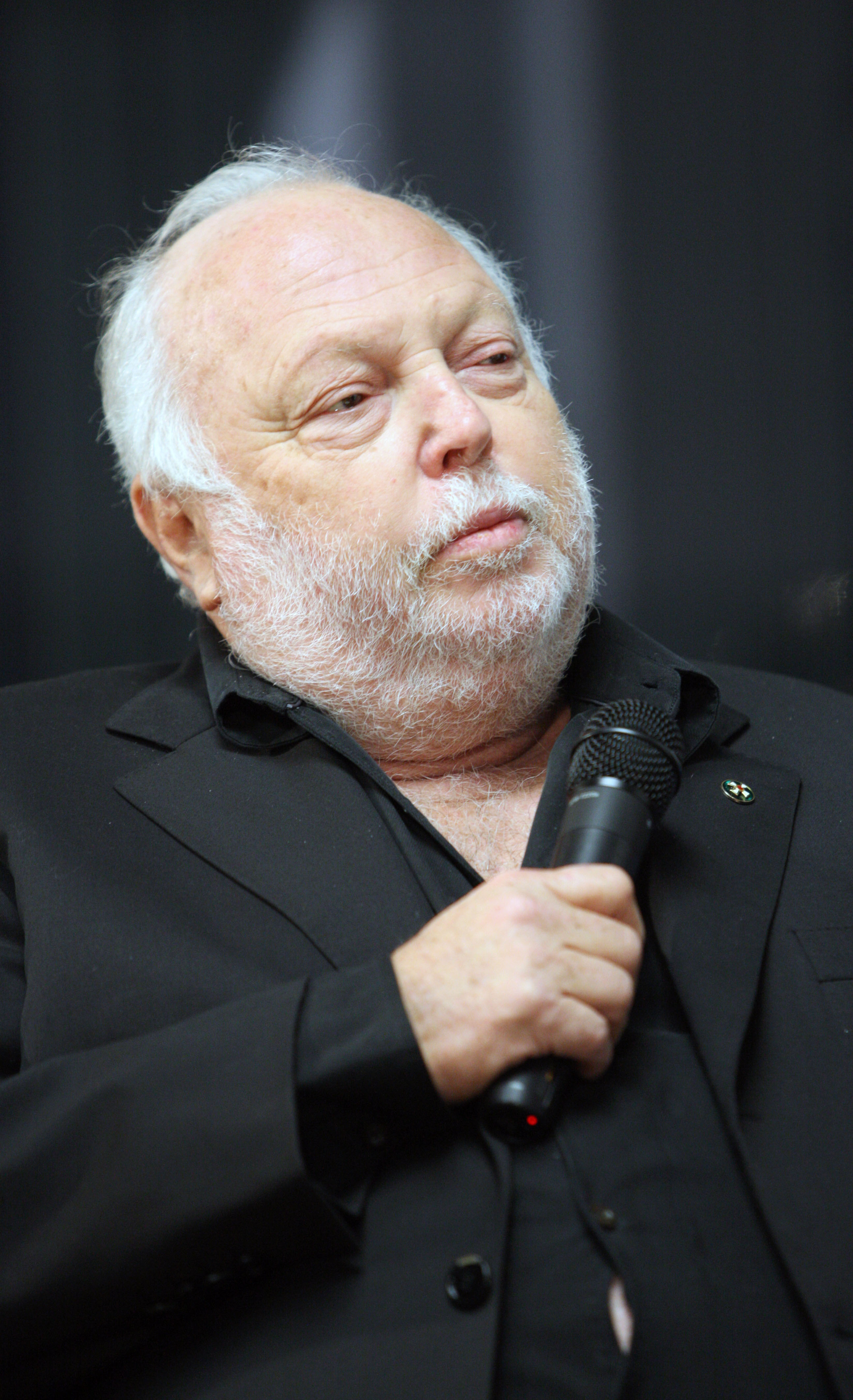
Andrew G. Vajna

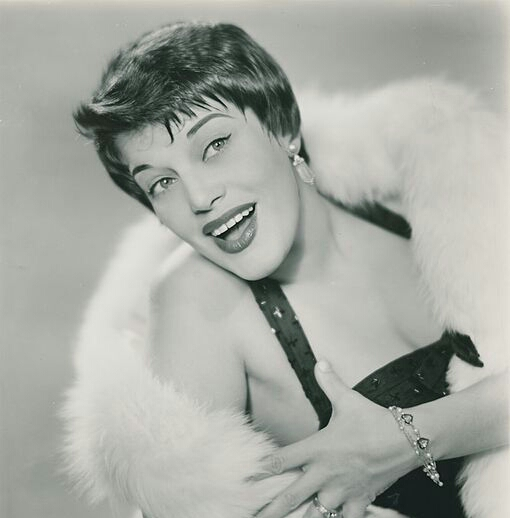
Kaye Ballard

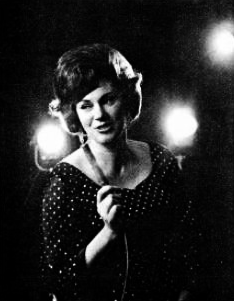
Maxine Brown

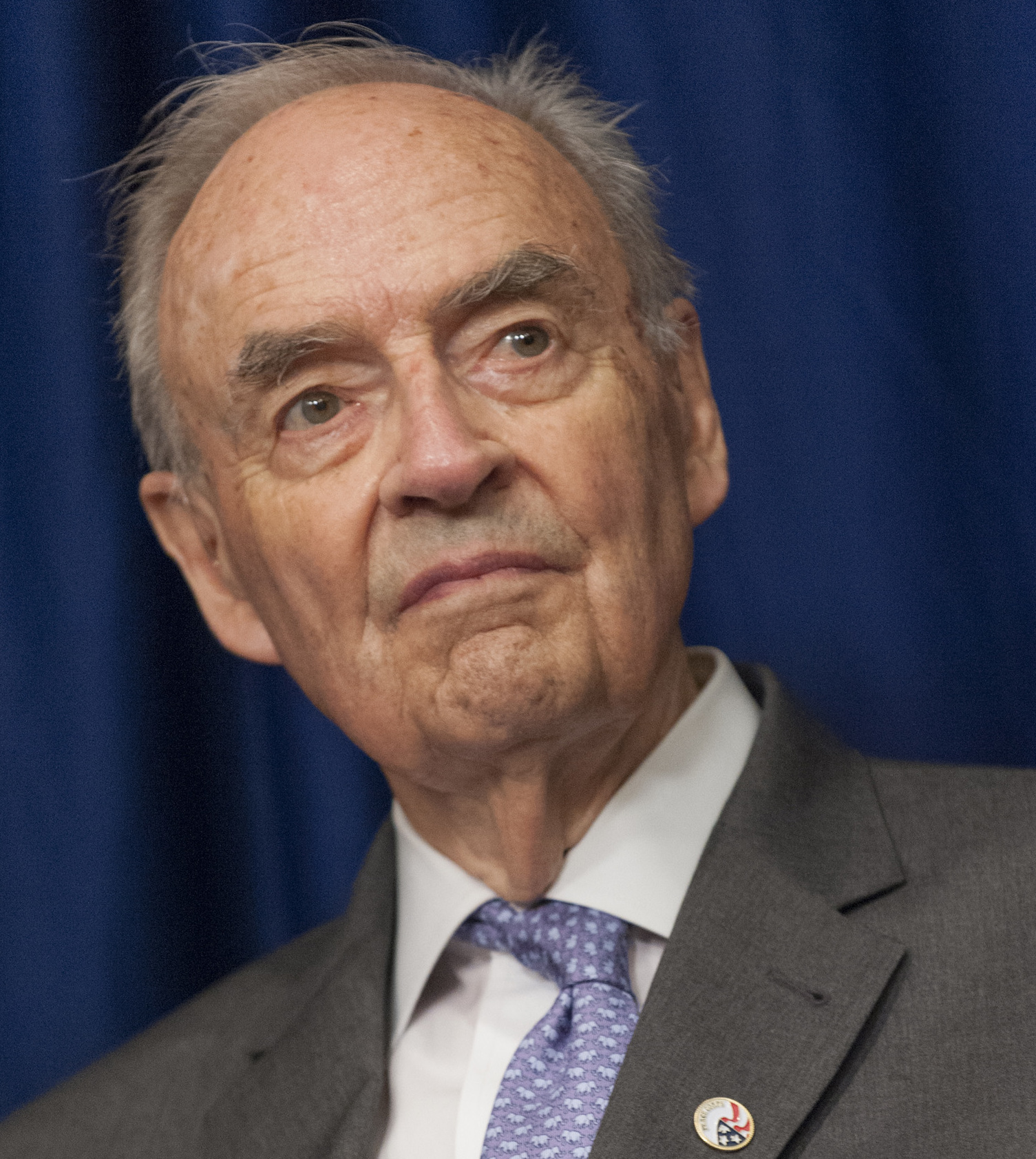
Harris Wofford

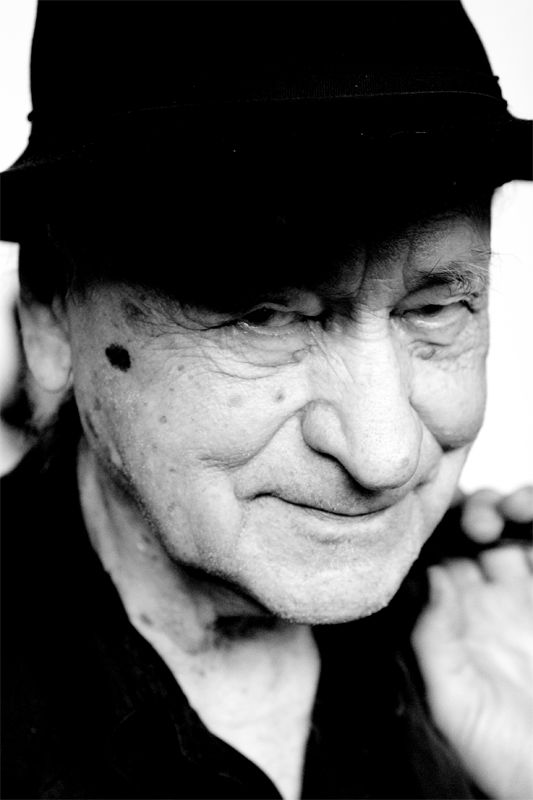
Jonas Mekas

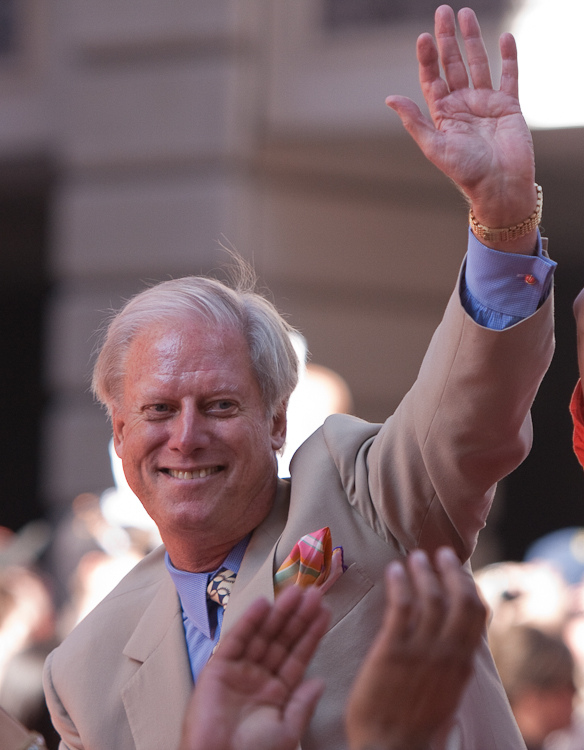
Peter Magowan

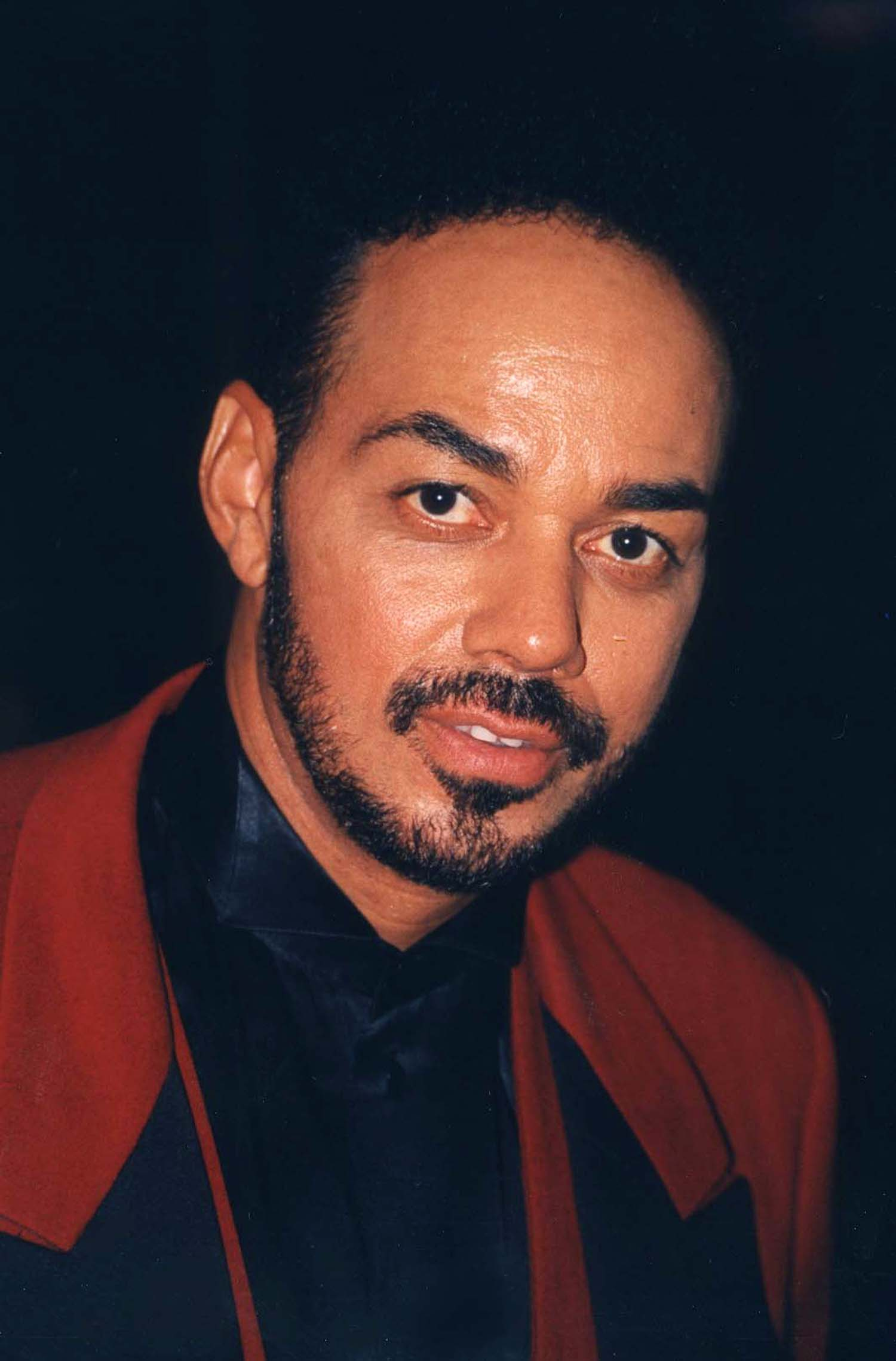
James Ingram

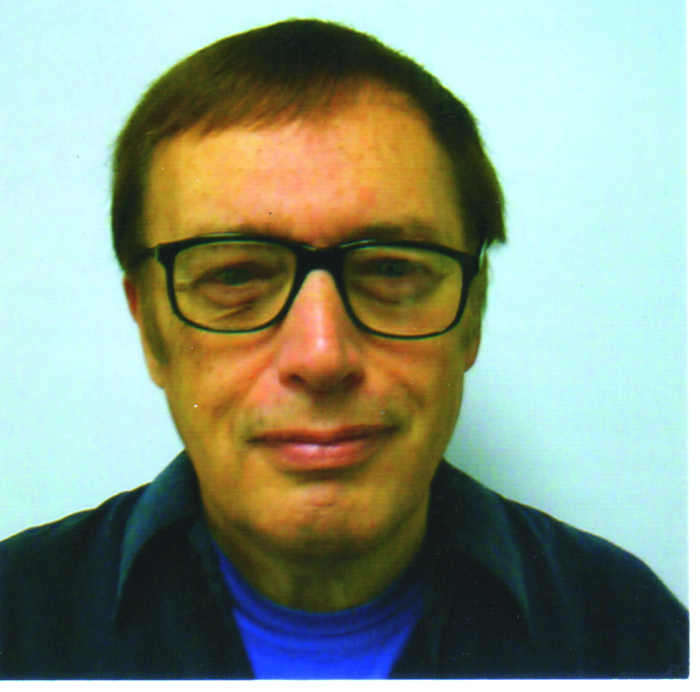
Jan Wahl

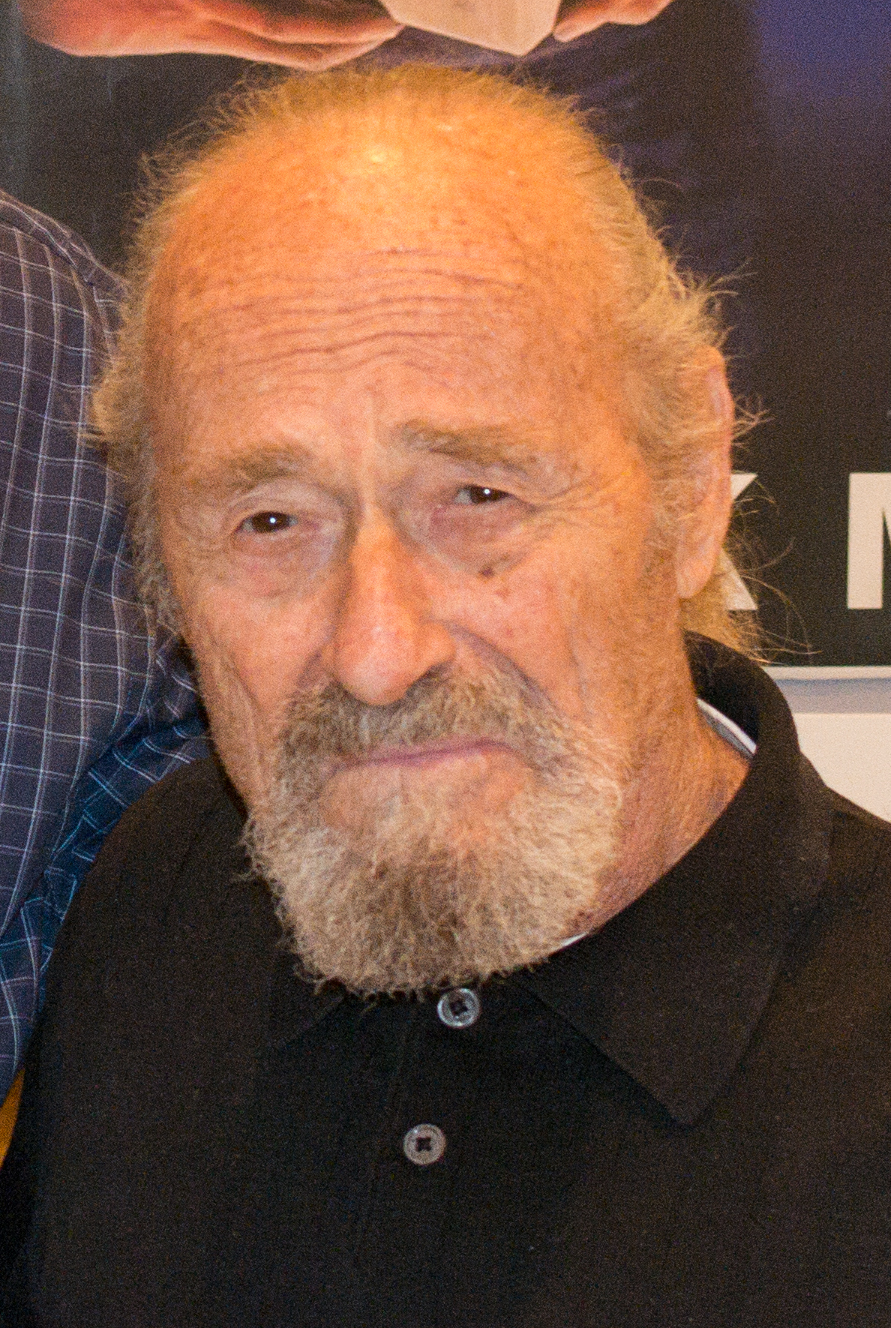
Dick Miller

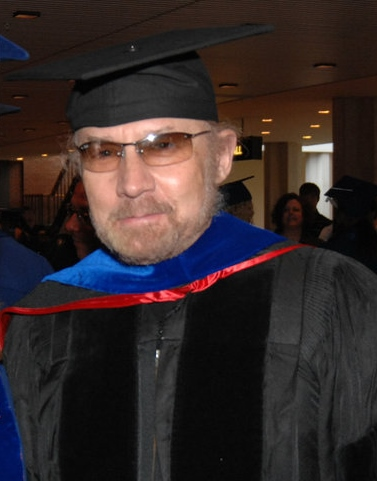
Andrzej Wieckowski

- January 1
  - Ludwig W. Adamec, Austrian-born historian (b. 1924)
  - Shane Bisnett, bassist (Ice Nine Kills) (b. 1987)
  - Ed Corney, bodybuilder (b. 1933)
  - Walt McKeel, baseball player (b. 1972)
  - Richard Rifkind, cancer researcher (b. 1930)
  - Steven P. Schinke, social work scholar (b. 1945)
  - Larry Weinberg, real estate developer and sports team owner (Portland Trail Blazers) (b. 1926)
  - Gilbert R. Winham, political scientist (b. 1938)
  - Pegi Young, educator, philanthropist, and singer-songwriter (b. 1952)
  - Perry Deane Young, journalist and playwright (b. 1941)
- January 2
  - Malcolm Beard, politician (b. 1919)
  - Darwin Bromley, game designer, founder of Mayfair Games (b. 1950)
  - Jerry Buchek, baseball player (b. 1943)
  - Daryl Dragon, musician (b. 1942)
  - Bob Einstein, comedian, actor (b. 1942)
  - Theodore E. Gildred, diplomat (b. 1935)
  - Bob Hanner, politician (b. 1945)
  - Waun Ki Hong, oncologist (b. 1942)
  - Jerry Magee, sportswriter (b. 1928)
  - Jim Margraff, football coach (b. 1960)
  - Kevin J. McIntyre, government official, Chairman of the FERC (2017–2018) (b. 1961)
  - Blake Nordstrom, businessman, co-president of Nordstrom (b. 1960)
  - Gene Okerlund, wrestling announcer (b. 1942)
  - George Welsh, football coach (b. 1933)
- January 3
  - Richard C. Bradt, materials engineer (b. 1938)
  - Bob Burrow, basketball player (b. 1934)
  - William Cochran, politician (b. 1934)
  - Sylvia Chase, news anchor and journalist (b. 1938)
  - John Falsey, writer and producer (b. 1951)
  - Roy Givens, politician (b. 1929)
  - Herb Kelleher, businessman, co-founder of Southwest Airlines (b. 1931)
  - William Miller, football player (b. 1956)
  - Steve Ripley, musician (The Tractors) (b. 1950)
  - Thais St Julien, opera singer (b. 1945)
  - Harold A. Hopkins Jr., priest (b. 1930)
- January 4
  - Norman Birnbaum, sociologist (b. 1926)
  - Harold Brown, 14th United States Secretary of Defense (b. 1927)
  - Moffatt Burriss, politician (b. 1919)
  - Charles Currie, Jesuit academic administrator (b. 1929)
  - Diana Decker, American-born British actress and singer (b. 1925)
  - Harold Demsetz, economist (b. 1930)
  - Leo J. Dulacki, general (b. 1918)
  - Louisa Moritz, Cuban-born actress (b. 1946)
- January 5
  - Rick Down, baseball coach (b. 1950)
  - Scott Dozier, convicted murderer (b. 1970)
  - Alvin Fielder, jazz drummer (b. 1935)
  - Kenneth Hedberg, chemist (b. 1920)
  - Stanley Insler, philologist (b. 1937)
  - Pete Manning, football player (b. 1937)
  - Rudolf Raff, biologist (b. 1941)
  - John L. Said, Episcopal bishop (b. 1932)
  - Bernice Sandler, women's rights activist (b. 1928)
  - Alexis Smirnoff, Canadian professional wrestler (b. 1947)
- January 6
  - Jo Andres, filmmaker, choreographer and artist (b. 1954)
  - Joe Belmont, basketball player and coach (b. 1934)
  - Ben Coleman, basketball player (b. 1961)
  - George Crowe, Canadian ice hockey coach (b. 1936)
  - Lenny Green, baseball player (b. 1932)
  - Roy Hilton, football player (b. 1943)
  - Robert L. Kahn, social psychologist (b. 1918)
  - Kwamie Lassiter, football player (b. 1969)
  - Alan R. Pearlman, sound engineer, founder of ARP Instruments (b. 1925)
  - Gregg Rudloff, sound mixer (b. 1955)
  - Lamin Sanneh, Gambian-born professor (b. 1942)
  - W. Morgan Sheppard, English actor (b. 1932)
  - Myron Thompson, American-born Canadian politician (b. 1936)
- January 7
  - Edwin Erickson, politician (b. 1938)
  - Clydie King, singer (b. 1943)
  - John Mendelsohn, pharmacologist (b. 1936)
  - Theodore K. Rabb, historian (b. 1937)
  - Tom Rukavina, politician (b. 1950)
  - Babs Simpson, fashion editor (b. 1913)
  - Barbara Elaine Ruth Brown, biologist and philanthropist (b. 1929)
- January 8
  - Wendy Ashmore, archaeologist and anthropologist (b. 1948)
  - Larry Langford, politician (b. 1946)
- January 9
  - Verna Bloom, actress (b. 1939)
  - Earnest F. Gloyna, environmental engineer (b. 1921)
  - Joseph Lawson Howze, Roman Catholic prelate (b. 1923)
  - Joseph Jarman, jazz musician and priest (b. 1937)
  - Matthew Locricchio, author of cookbooks and actor (b. 1947)
  - Melvin L. Moeschberger, biostatistician (b. 1940)
  - Alan Trask, politician (b. 1933)
  - Lester Wunderman, advertising executive, creator of direct marketing (b. 1920)
  - Paul Koslo, German-Canadian actor (b. 1944)
  - Don Reynolds, actor and animal trainer (b. 1937)
- January 10
  - Larry Cunningham, singer (The Floaters) (b. 1951)
  - Andy de Groat, choreographer (b. 1947)
  - Rick Forzano, football coach (b. 1928)
  - Johnny Hetki, baseball player (b. 1922)
  - John Michels, football player and coach (b. 1931)
  - José Andreu García, Chief Justice of the Supreme Court of Puerto Rico (1992–2003) (b. 1937)
- January 11
  - Shirley Boone, philanthropist (b. 1934)
  - Walter Chandoha, photographer (b. 1920)
  - Gus Ganakas, college basketball coach (b. 1926)
  - J. D. Gibbs, race car driver, co-owner of Joe Gibbs Racing (b. 1969)
  - John G. Gunderson, psychiatrist (b. 1942)
  - Walter V. Shipley, businessman, CEO of Chase Manhattan Bank (1996–1999) (b. 1935)
  - Jumping Johnny Wilson, basketball player (b. 1927)
  - Robert Horn, water polo player (b. 1931)
- January 12
  - George Ball, entomologist (b. 1926)
  - Anthony Colaizzo, politician (b. 1930)
  - Paul Englund, biochemist (b. 1938)
  - Bonnie Guitar, country musician (b. 1923)
  - Joe M. Jackson, Air Force officer (b. 1923)
  - Bob Kuechenberg, football player (b. 1947)
  - Batton Lash, comic book writer and artist (b. 1953)
  - Leonard M. Pike, horticulture professor (b. 1940)
  - Sanger D. Shafer, country songwriter (b. 1934)
  - Patricia Wald, judge, Chief Judge of the D.C. Circuit (1986–1991) (b. 1928)
  - Tom Brosius, track and field athlete (b. 1949)
- January 13
  - Douglas M. Costle, environmentalist (b. 1939)
  - Francine du Plessix Gray, author (b. 1930)
  - Willie Murphy, blues musician (b. 1943)
  - Alfred K. Newman, Navajo Code talker (b. 1924)
  - Francis W. Nye, Major General in the U.S. Air Force (b. 1918)
  - Mel Stottlemyre, baseball player and coach (b. 1941)
  - Mark Urman, film producer and distributor (b. 1952)
- January 14
  - Milton Bluehouse Sr., politician (b. 1935)
  - Dick Brodowski, baseball player (b. 1932)
  - Eli Grba, baseball player (b. 1934)
  - Raymond G. Perelman, businessman (b. 1917)
  - Gavin Smith, Canadian poker player (b. 1968)
  - Omar Phillips, drummer (b. 1970)
- January 15
  - Bill Anagnos, stuntman and actor (b. 1958)
  - Bradley Bolke, voice actor (b. 1925)
  - Carol Channing, actress, singer and dancer (b. 1921)
  - Walter Klein, filmmaker, founder of International Quorum of Motion Picture Producers (b. 1923)
  - Mason Lowe, professional bull rider (b. 1993)
  - Tim Maypray, football player (b. 1988)
  - John J. McKetta, chemical engineer (b. 1915)
  - Bruce Tufeld, talent agent and manager (b. 1952)
- January 16
  - John C. Bogle, investor, founder of The Vanguard Group (b. 1929)
  - Lorna Doom, punk rock bassist (Germs) (b. 1958)
  - Tom Hausman, baseball player (b. 1953)
  - Hank Norton, football coach (b. 1927)
  - Barbara Tsakirgis, archaeologist (b. 1954)
  - Rita Vidaurri, singer (b. 1924)
- January 17
  - Debi Martini, punk rock singer and bassist (Red Aunts)
  - Joe O'Donnell, football player (b. 1941)
  - Mary Oliver, poet (b. 1935)
  - Mary Jane Osborn, biochemist and molecular biologist (b. 1927)
  - Sam Savage, novelist and poet (b. 1940)
  - Turk Schonert, football player (b. 1957)
  - Helen Smith, baseball player (b. 1921)
  - Daniel C. Striepeke, makeup artist (b. 1930)
  - Reggie Young, musician (b. 1936)
- January 18
  - Boo, Pomeranian and internet celebrity (b. 2006)
  - John Coughlin, Pairs figure skater (b. 1985)
  - Gary Gutting, philosopher (b. 1942)
  - Dan Orlich, football player (b. 1924)
  - William A. Thomas, college football player and coach (b. 1948)
  - Glen Wood, racing driver, co-founder of Wood Brothers Racing (b. 1925)
  - Robert Morey, rower (b. 1936)
- January 19
  - Nathan Glazer, sociologist (b. 1923)
  - Thomas Habinek, classical scholar (b. 1953)
  - Tony Mendez, intelligence officer (b. 1940)
  - Margaret Wigiser, baseball player (b. 1924)
  - Daniel C. Striepeke, makeup artist (b. 1930)
- January 20
  - Tibor Baranski, Hungarian-American educator (b. 1922)
  - Rosemarie Bowe, model and actress (b. 1932)
  - Kenneth Bruffee, academic (b. 1934)
  - Norman Itzkowitz, historian (b. 1931)
  - Jerry Kupcinet, director and producer (b. 1944)
  - Jimmy Rayl, basketball player (b. 1941)
  - Bobby Shows, politician (b. 1938)
  - Andrew G. Vajna, Hungarian-American film producer (b. 1944)
- January 21
  - Russell Baker, writer (b. 1925)
  - Kaye Ballard, actress and singer (b. 1925)
  - Maxine Brown, country singer (The Browns) (b. 1931)
  - Edwin Birdsong, funk keyboardist (b. 1941)
  - Evening Attire, racehorse (b. 1998)
  - Charles Kettles, colonel, Medal of Honor recipient (b. 1930)
  - Mike Ledbetter, blues musician (b. 1985)
  - Richard H. Lyon, acoustical engineer (b. 1929)
  - Leo Paquette, chemist (b. 1934)
  - Harris Wofford, attorney and politician (b. 1926)
- January 22
  - Kevin Barnett, comedian and screenwriter (b. 1986)
  - Leonard Dinnerstein, historian (b. 1934)
  - James Frawley, television and film director (b. 1936)
  - Bill Mackrides, football player (b. 1925)
  - John Mortimer Smith, Roman Catholic prelate (b. 1935)
  - Henry Horwitz, historian (b. 1938)
  - Maureen Murphy, swimmer (b. 1939)
- January 23
  - Richard Bodycombe, military officer (b. 1922)
  - Jack Thomas Brinkley, politician, educator and lawyer (b. 1930)
  - Nils Hasselmo, Swedish-American academic administrator (b. 1940)
  - Jim McKean, Canadian baseball player (b. 1945)
  - Jonas Mekas, Lithuanian-born filmmaker, poet and artist (b. 1922)
  - Erik Olin Wright, Marxist sociologist (b. 1947)
  - Willie York, homeless activist (b. 1944)
- January 24
  - Norman Goodman, municipal official (b. 1923)
  - Jerard Hurwitz, biochemist (b. 1928)
  - Rosemary Bryant Mariner, naval aviator (b. 1953)
  - Robert H. Mounce, biblical scholar (b. 1921)
  - Norman Orentreich, dermatologist (b. 1922)
- January 25
  - Fatima Ali, Pakistani-born chef and reality show contestant (b. 1989)
  - Steve Bell, television anchorman and professor (b. 1935)
  - Bruce Corbitt, musician (b. 1962)
  - Henry C. Dethloff, historian (b. 1934)
  - Albert J. Dunlap, corporate executive (b. 1937)
  - Stanley Hill, union leader (b. 1936)
  - Florence Knoll, architect and furniture designer (b. 1917)
  - Meshulam Riklis, Turkish-born American-Israeli businessman (b. 1923)
  - Jacqueline Steiner, folk singer-songwriter and social activist (b. 1924)
- January 26
  - Dale Barnstable, basketball player (b. 1925)
  - Duane Benson, football player and politician (b. 1945)
  - William Esper, acting teacher (b. 1932)
  - William Ortwein, politician (b. 1940)
  - Mary Lou Robinson, district judge (b. 1926)
- January 27
  - Marshall E. Blume, economist (b. 1941)
  - Joseph Buttigieg, Maltese-American literary scholar (b. 1947)
  - Yvonne Clark, engineer (b. 1929)
  - Thomas Jones Enright, mathematician (b. 1947)
  - Peter Magowan, businessman (b. 1942)
  - Matt Turner, baseball player (b. 1967)
  - Erica Yohn, actress (b. 1928)
- January 28
  - Vere Claiborne Chappell, philosopher (b. 1930)
  - Susan Hiller, artist (b. 1940)
  - Henry Saavedra, politician (b. 1937)
  - Wickham Skinner, business theorist (b. 1924)
  - Doris L. Wethers, pediatrician (b. 1927)
  - Paul Whaley, drummer (b. 1946)
- January 29
  - Andy Hebenton, Canadian ice hockey player (b. 1929)
  - Charles J. Hynes, lawyer and politician (b. 1935)
  - James Ingram, R&B musician (b. 1952)
  - Sanford Sylvan, baritone (b. 1953)
  - William Van Alstyne, legal scholar (b. 1934)
  - Jan Wahl, children's writer (b. 1931)
- January 30
  - Nehanda Abiodun, rap music activist (b. 1950)
  - Diane Gaidry, actress (b. 1964)
  - Dick Miller, actor (b. 1928)
  - Lori Wilson, politician (b. 1937)
- January 31
  - Harold Bradley, country musician (b. 1926)
  - A. Ernest Fitzgerald, engineer (b. 1926)
  - Andrzej Wieckowski, Polish-born chemist (b. 1945)

== February ==
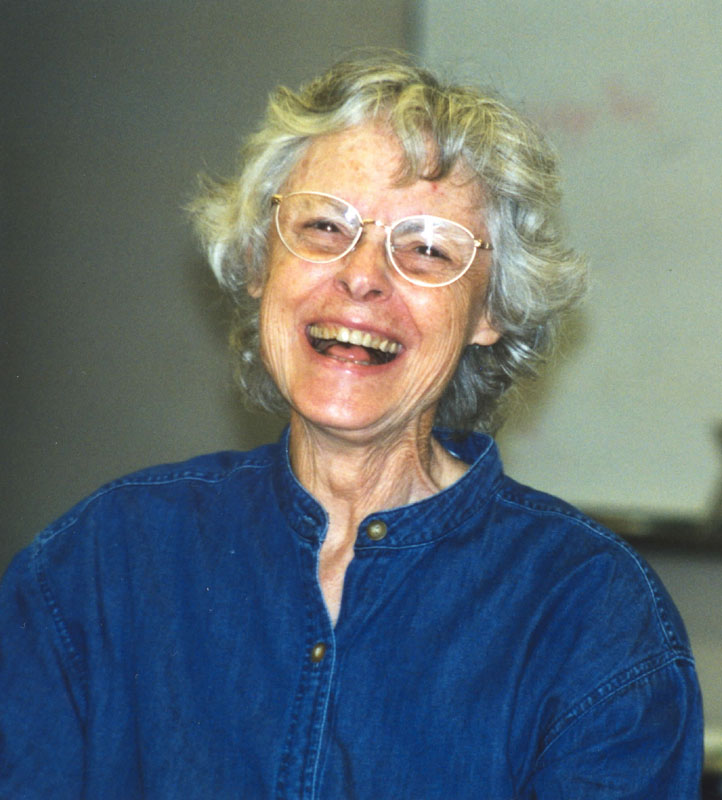
Carol Emshwiller

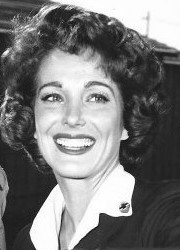
Julie Adams

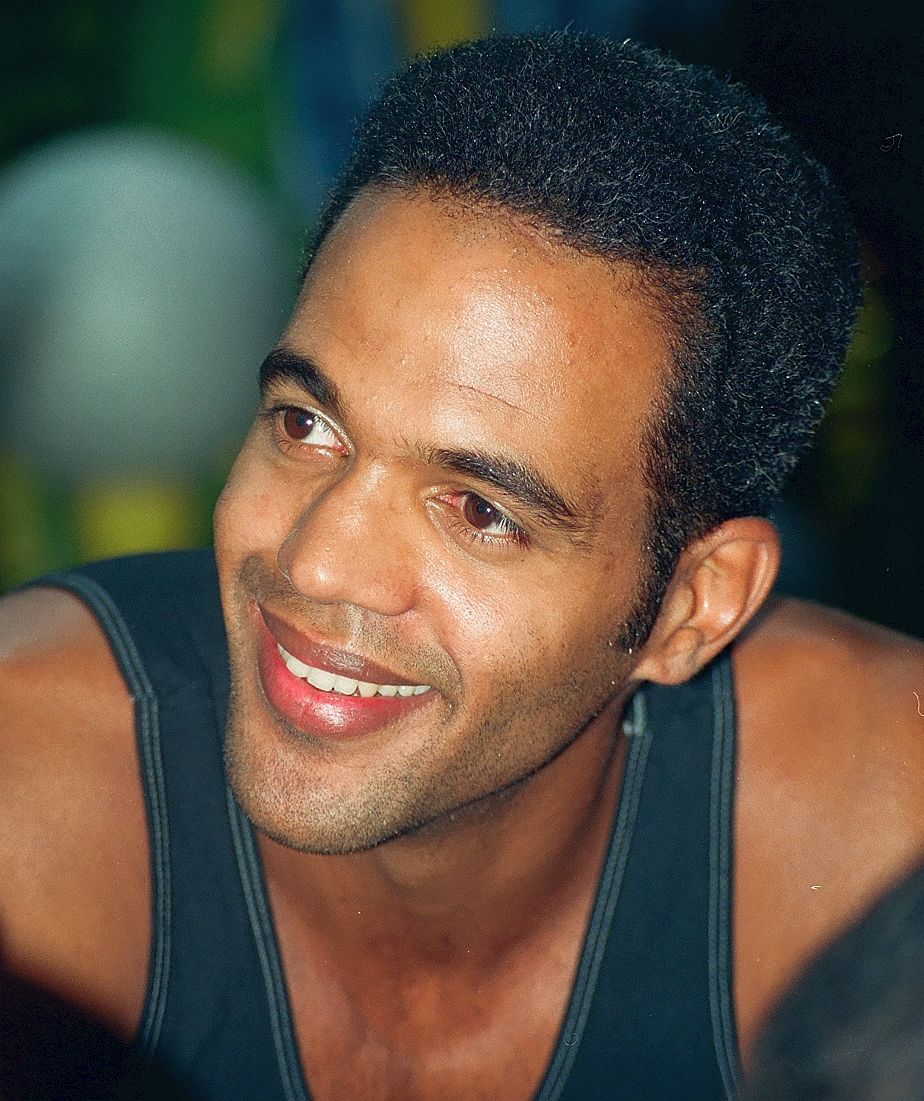
Kristoff St. John

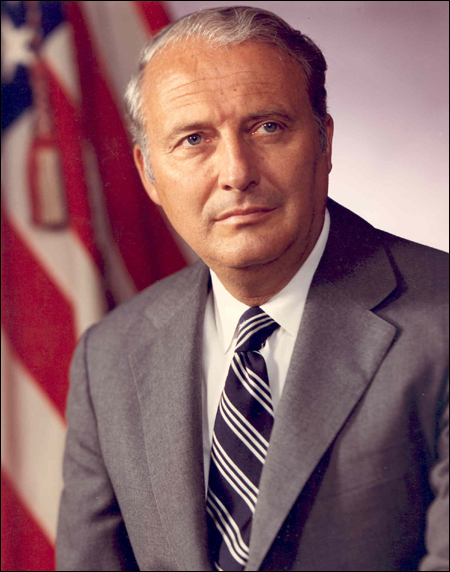
John Otho Marsh Jr.

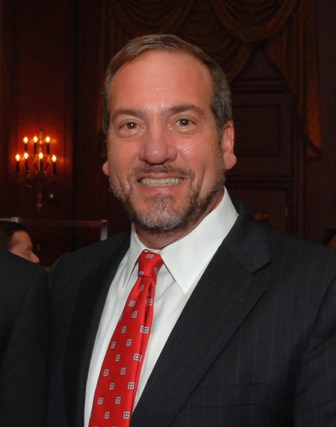
Yechiel Eckstein

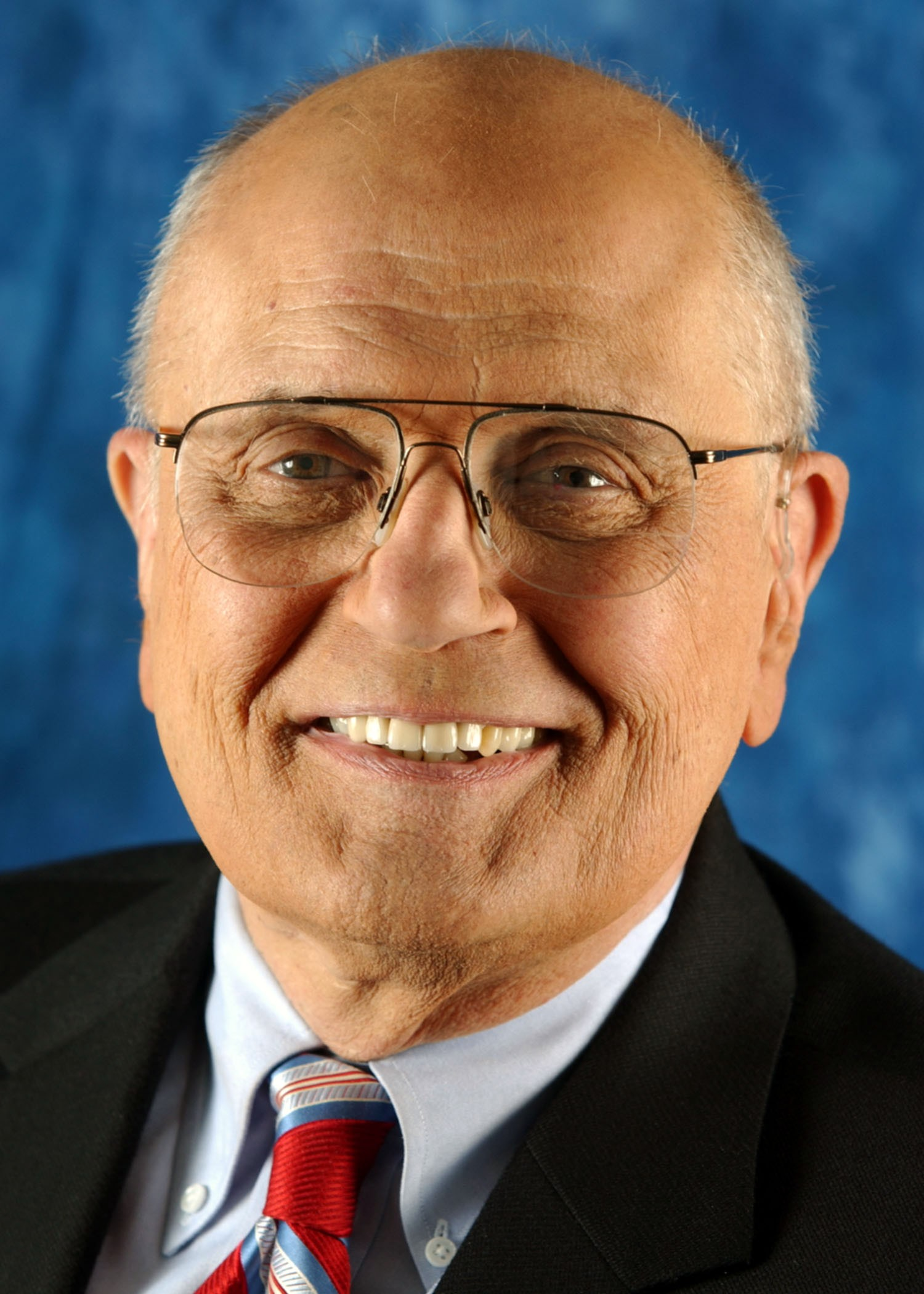
John Dingell

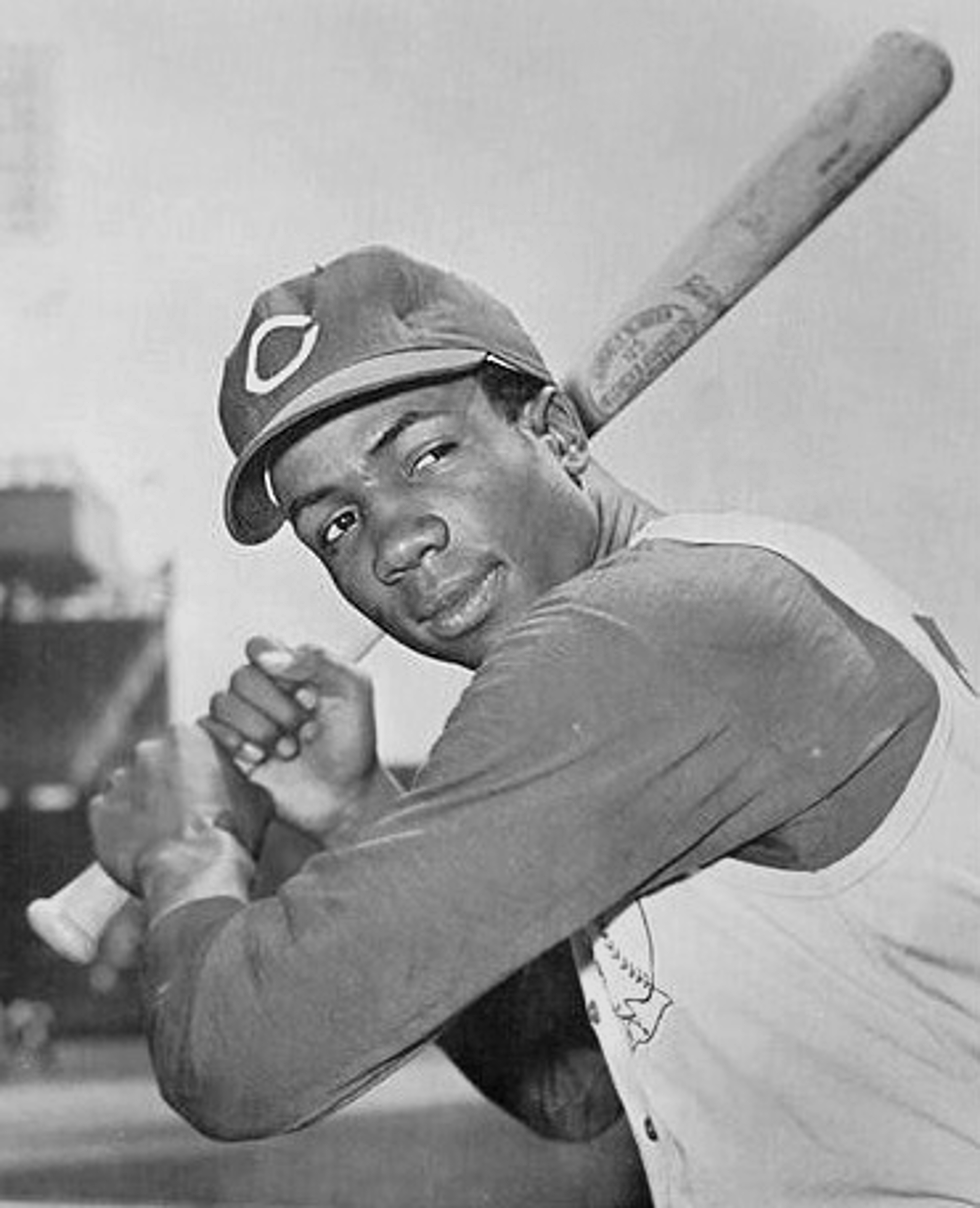
Frank Robinson

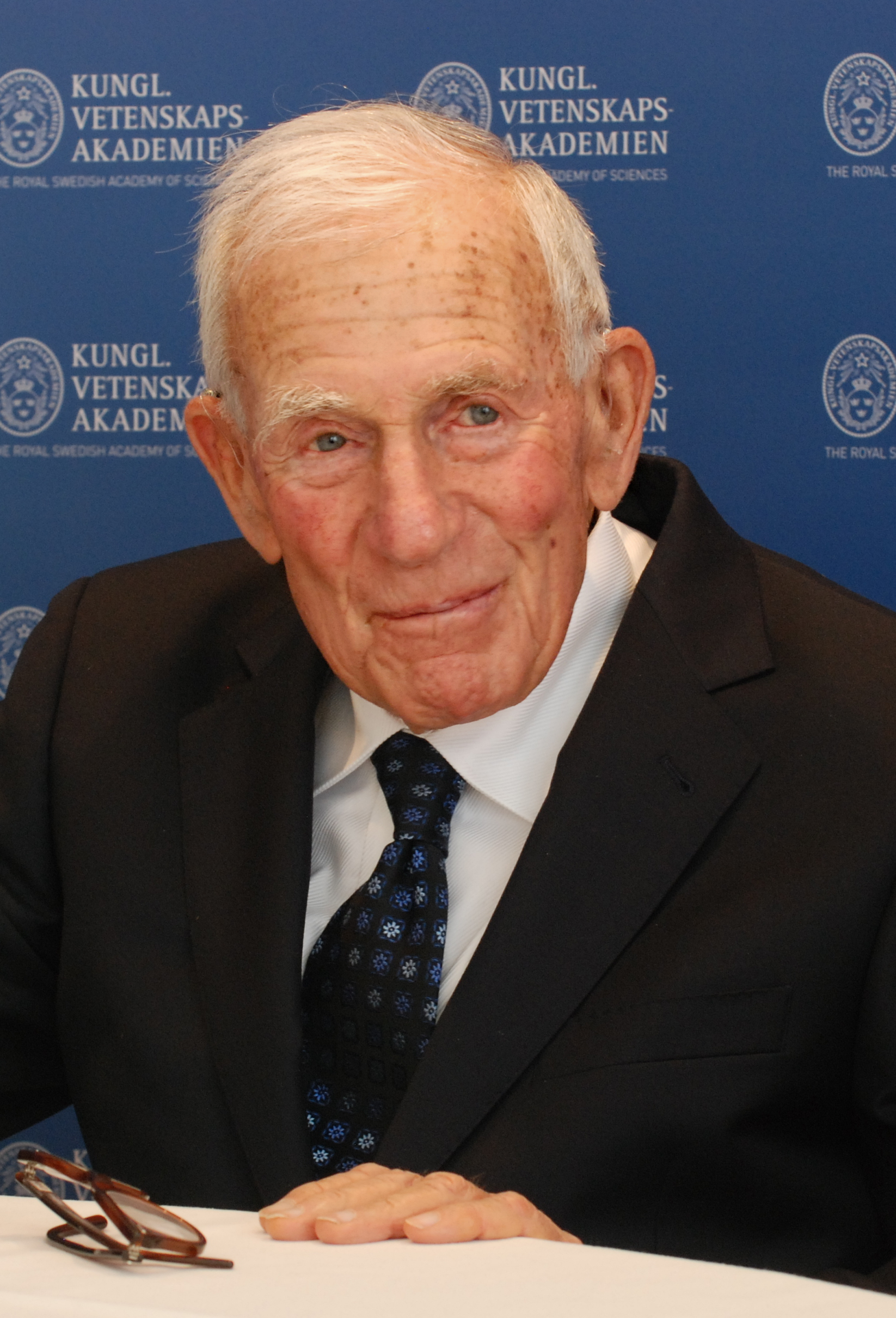
Walter Munk

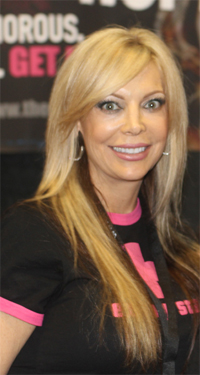
Shelley Lubben

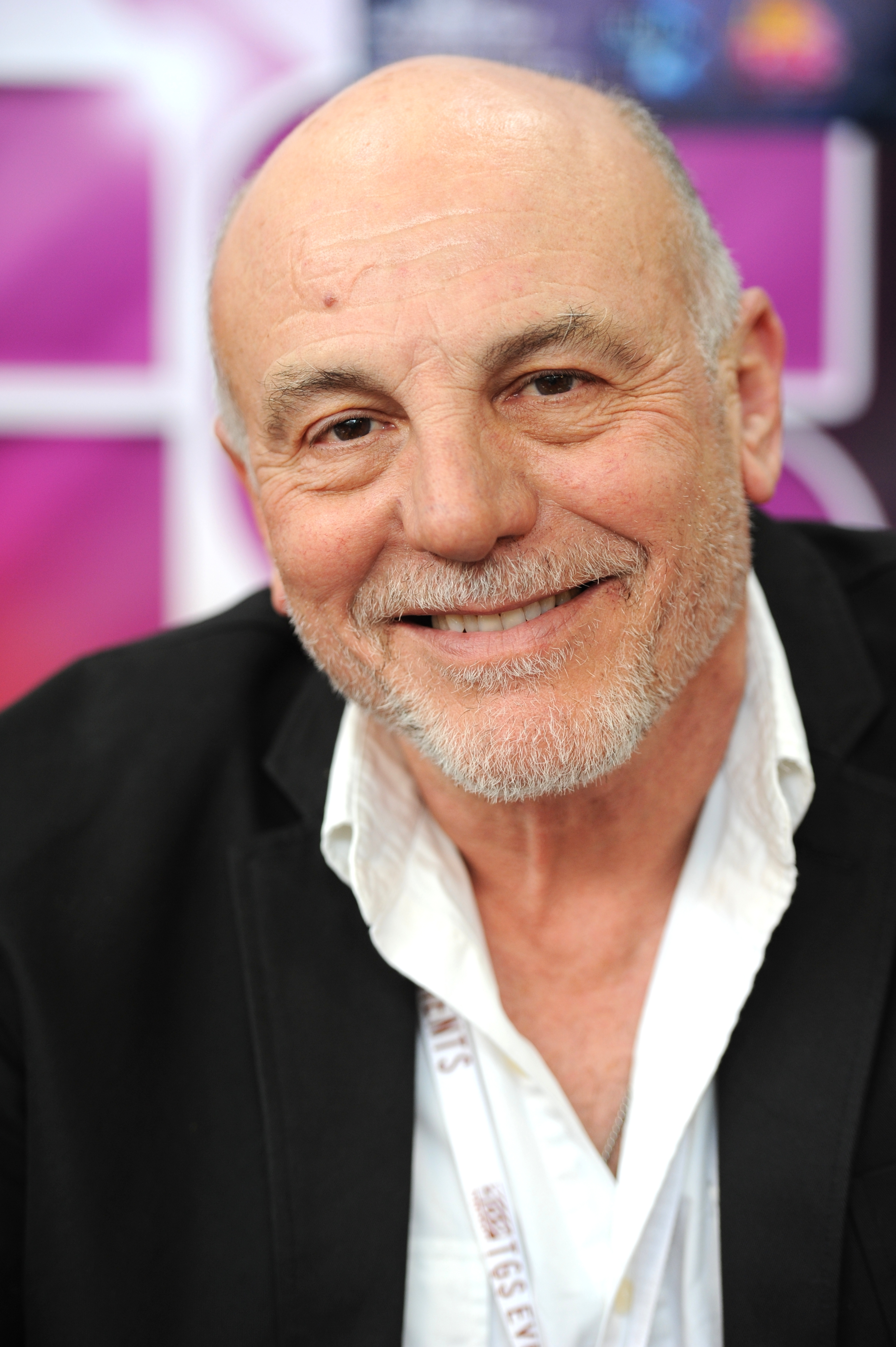
Carmen Argenziano

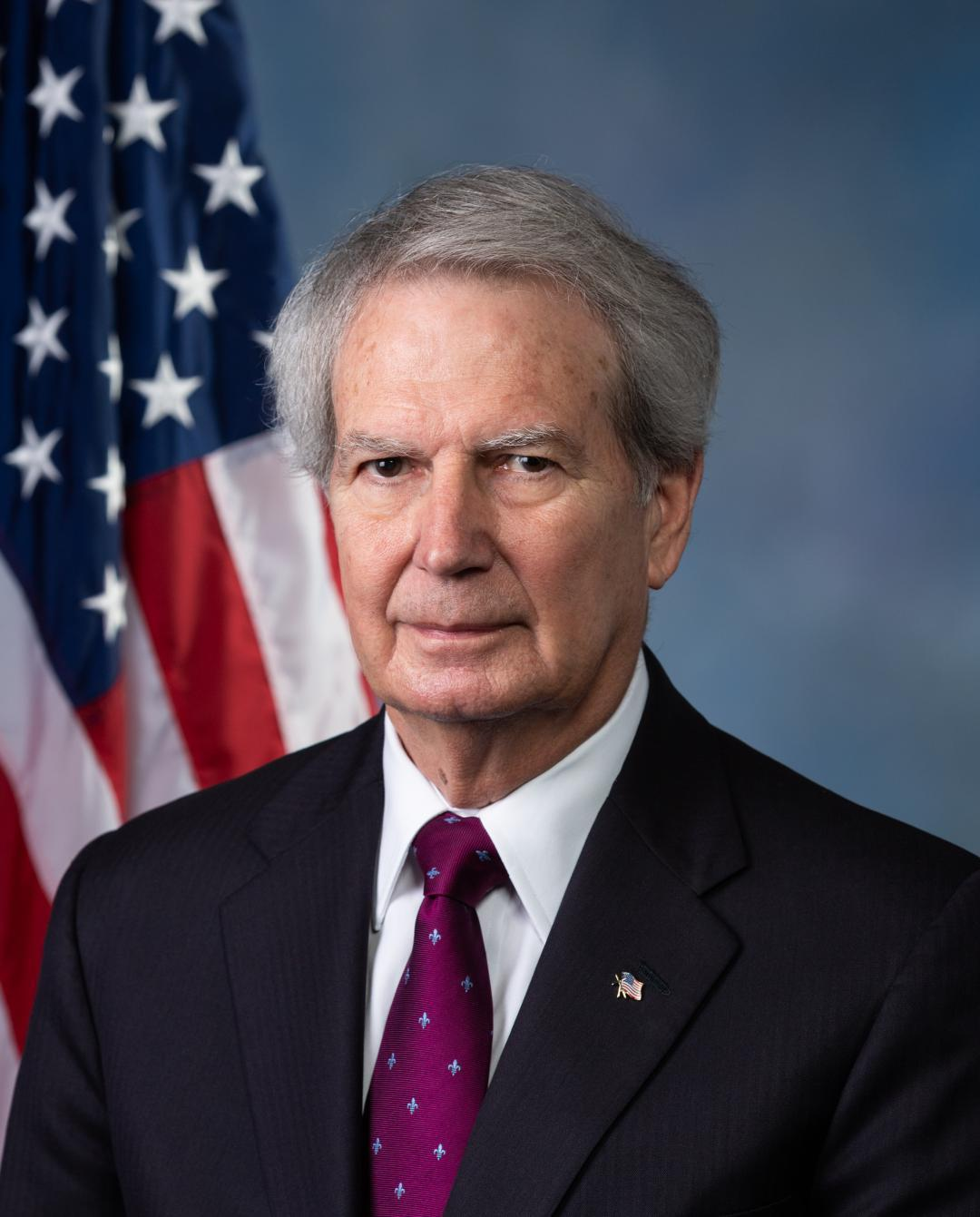
Walter B. Jones Jr.

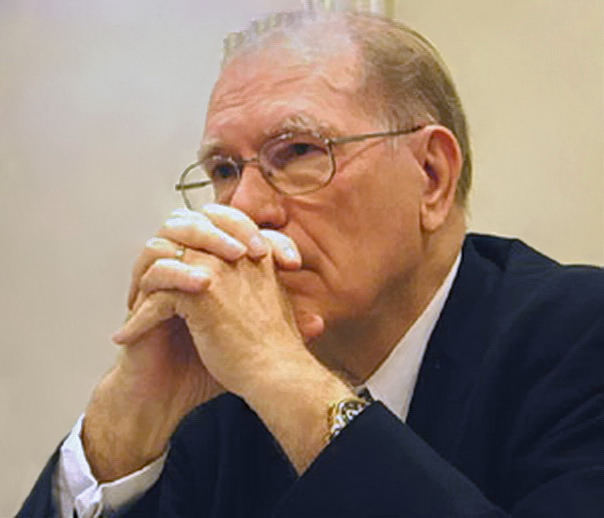
Lyndon LaRouche

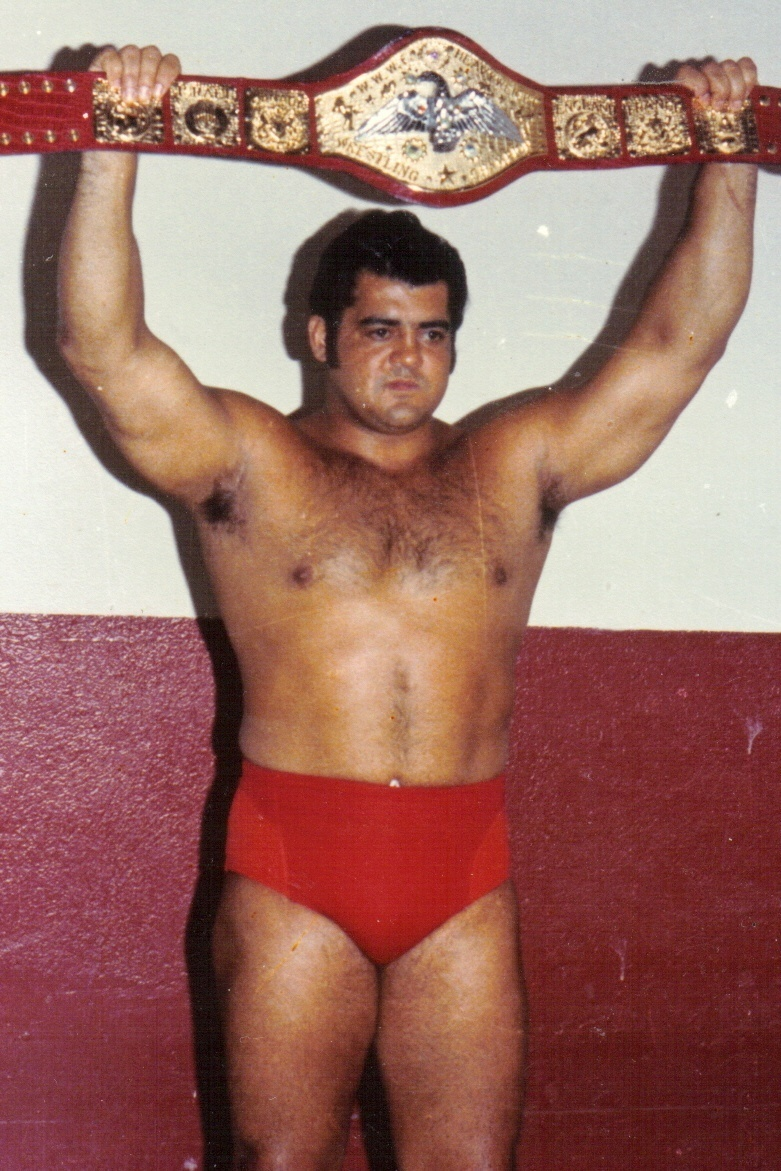
Pedro Morales

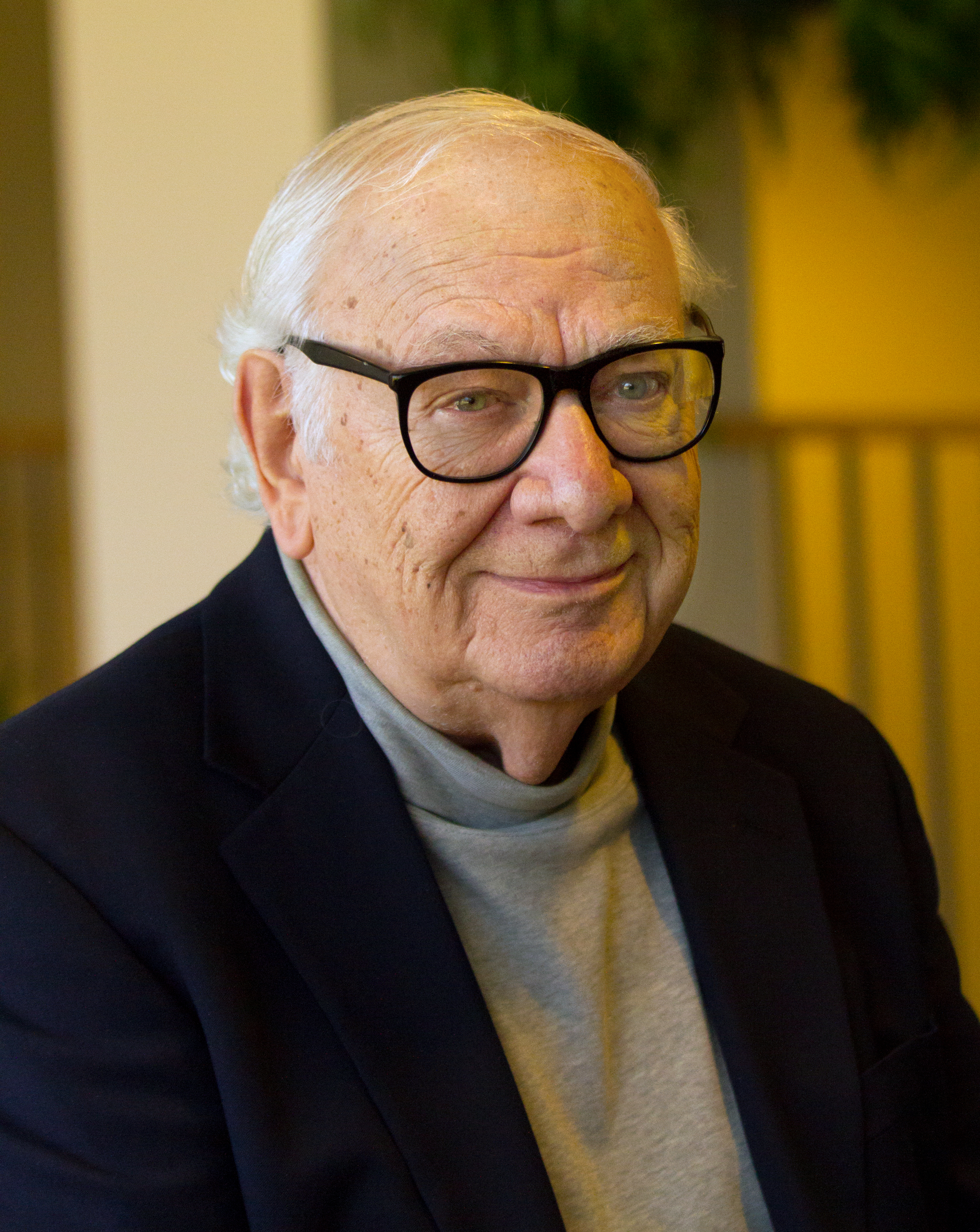
Dominick Argento

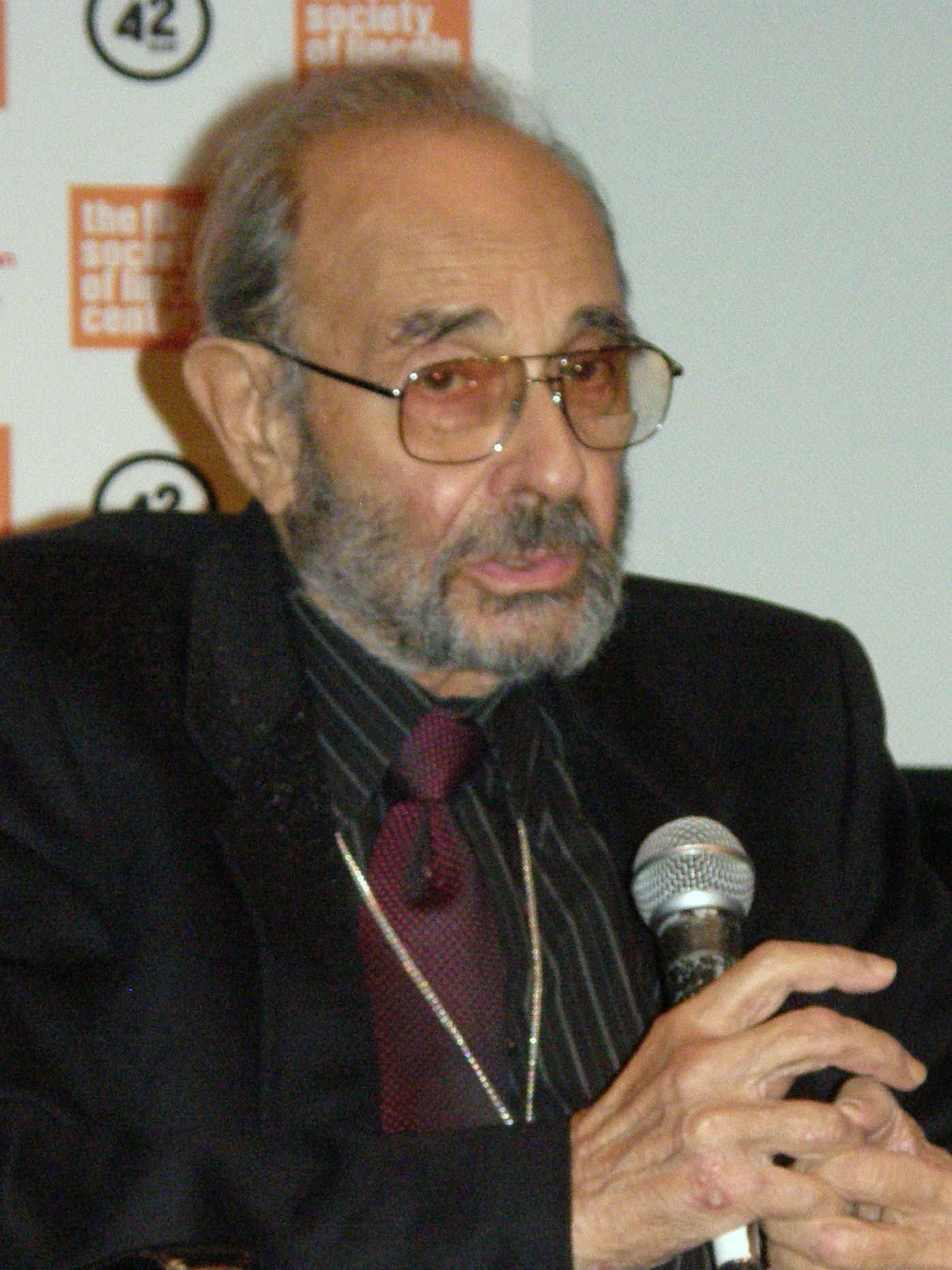
Stanley Donen

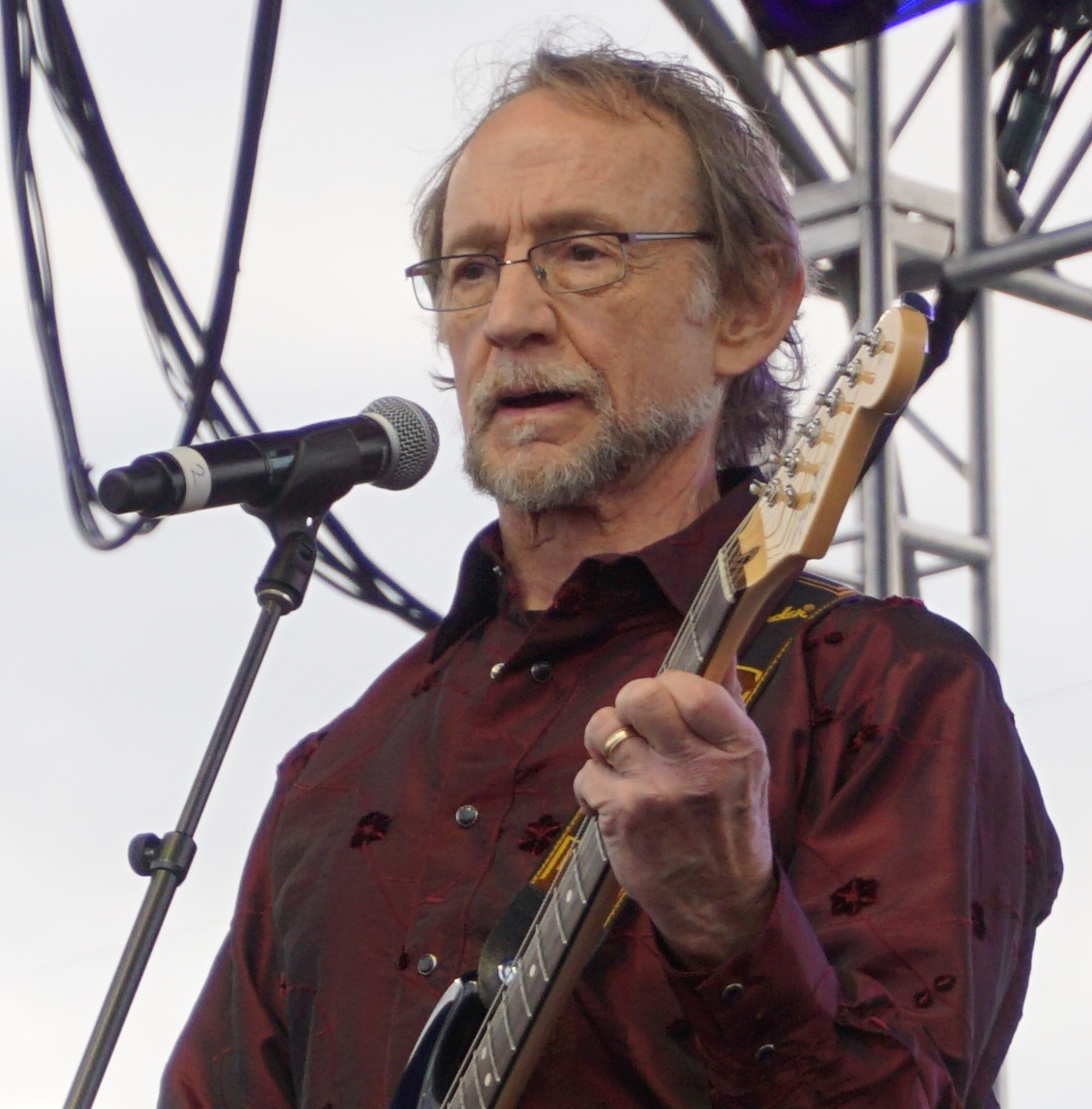
Peter Tork

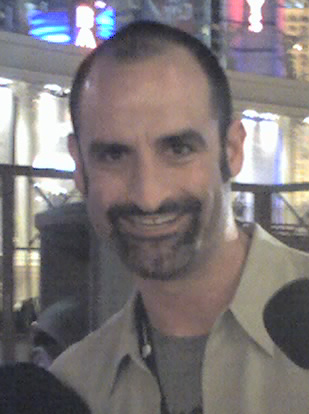
Brody Stevens

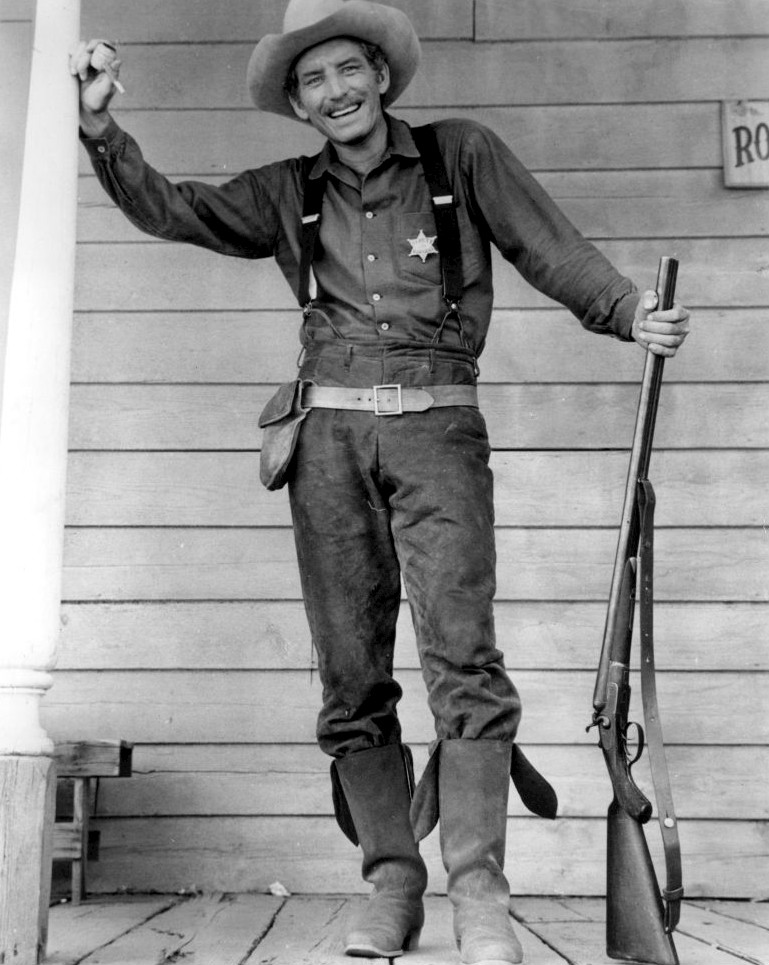
Morgan Woodward

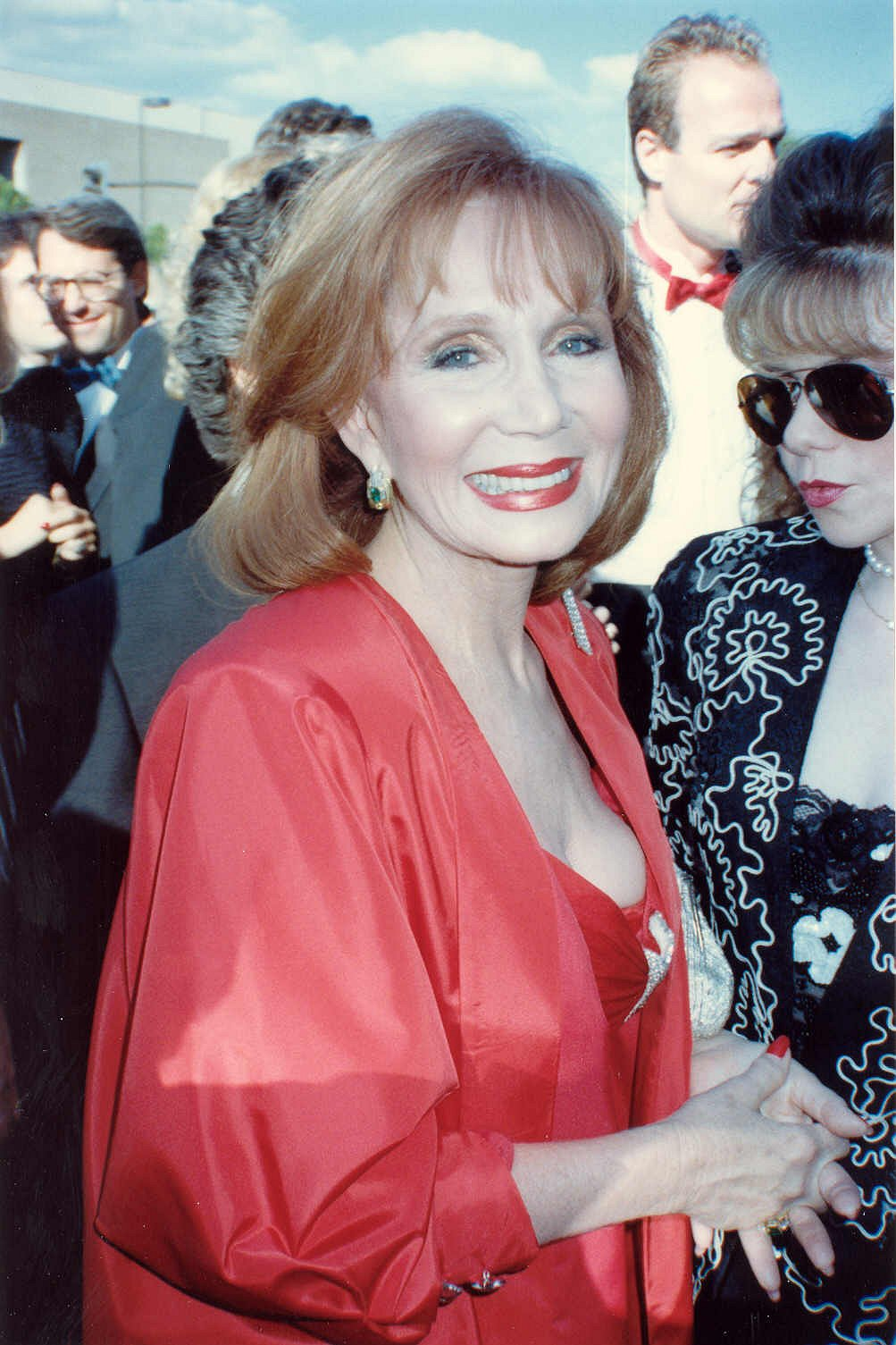
Katherine Helmond

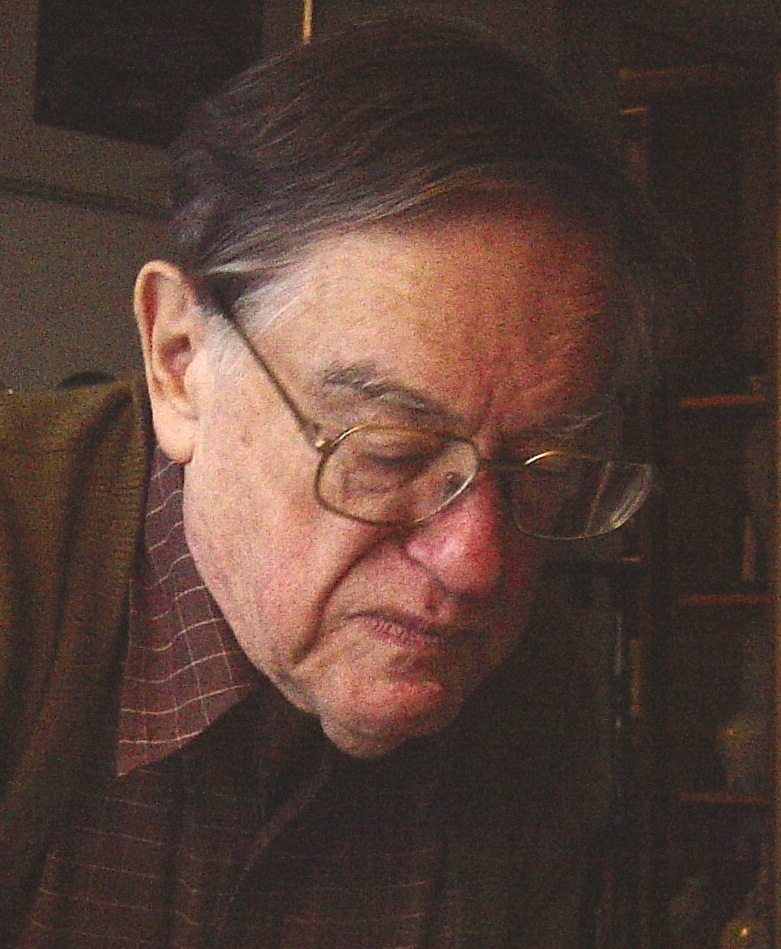
Donald Keene

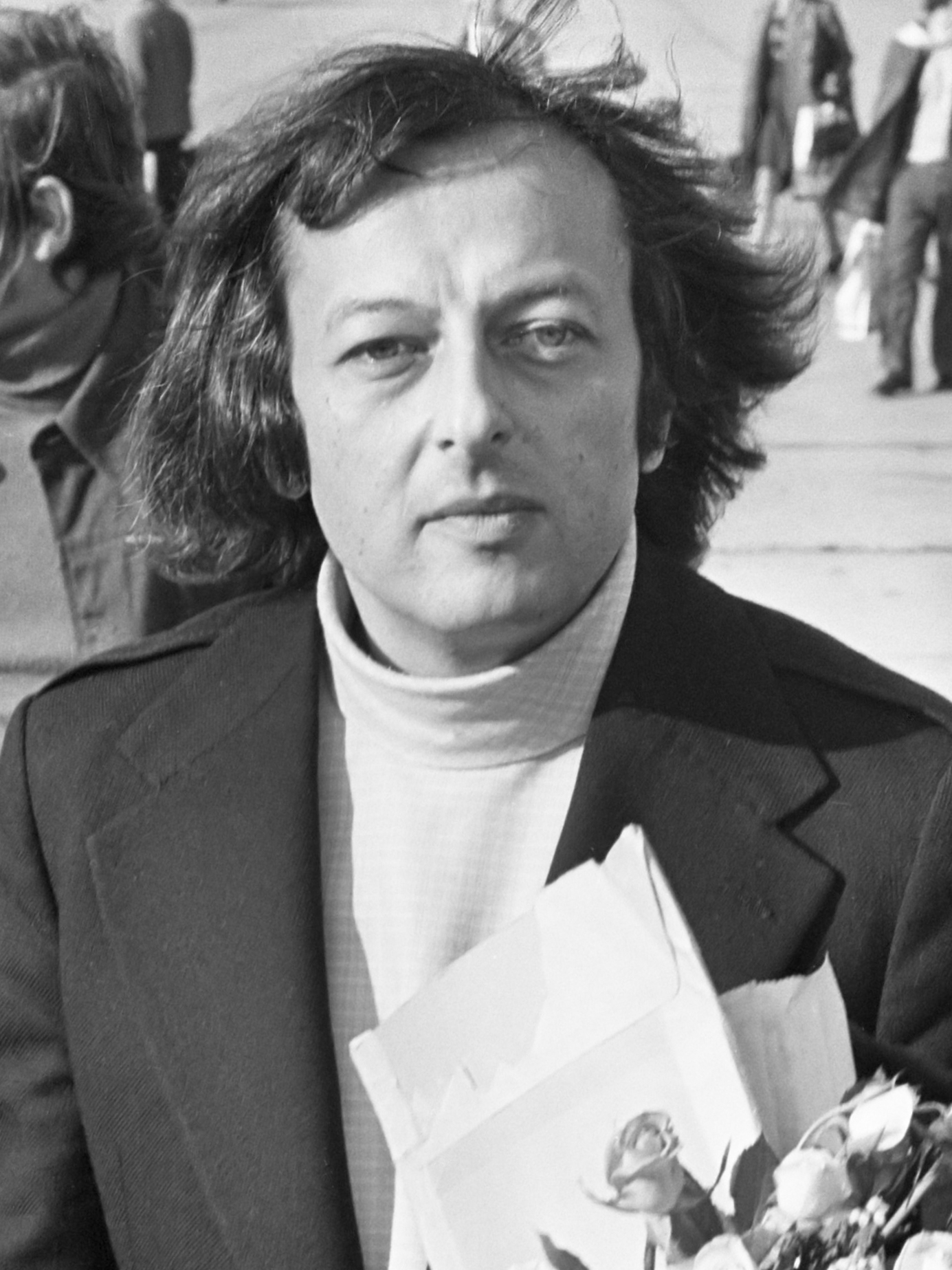
André Previn

- February 1
  - D. J. Conway, occult writer (b. 1938)
  - John J. Duffy Jr., criminal defense attorney (b. 1933)
  - Alice Dye, amateur golfer and golf course designer (b. 1927)
  - Alex Brown, painter and punk rock musician (b. 1966)
  - Glen Ray Hines, football player (b. 1943)
  - Lisa Seagram, actress (b. 1936)
  - Wade Wilson, football player and coach (b. 1958)
- February 2
  - Walter James Edyvean, prelate (b. 1938)
  - Carol Emshwiller, author (b. 1921)
  - Michelle King, educator (b. 1961)
  - Libby Komaiko, dancer (b. 1949)
  - Tim Landers, rock guitarist and singer
  - Irene Krugman Rudnick, politician (b. 1929)
  - Bill Sims, blues musician (b. 1949)
- February 3
  - Julie Adams, actress (b. 1926)
  - Irv Brown, sportscaster (b. 1934)
  - Bob Friend, baseball player (b. 1930)
  - Irving Lavin, art historian (b. 1927)
  - Emily Levine, humorist (b. 1945)
  - Stephen Negoesco, Romanian-American soccer player and coach (b. 1925)
  - Barbra Casbar Siperstein, lawyer and LGBT activist (b. 1942)
  - Kristoff St. John, actor (b. 1966)
  - Joe P. Tolson, politician (b. 1941)
- February 4
  - Nita Bieber, actress (b. 1926)
  - Gary LaPierre, radio journalist (b. 1942)
  - John Otho Marsh Jr., 14th United States Secretary of the Army (b. 1926)
  - John Rone, stage actor and director (b. 1949)
  - Izzy Young, American-Swedish folklorist and author (b. 1928)
- February 5
  - Audrey Cleary, politician (b. 1930)
  - Jean Herskovits, historian (b. 1935)
  - Christine Kay, journalist and editor (b. 1964)
  - Garr King, judge (b. 1935)
  - George Klein, disc jockey (b. 1935)
  - Joe Presko, baseball player (b. 1928)
  - Anne Firor Scott, historian (b. 1921)
  - Doc Thompson, radio personality (b. 1969)
  - Mel Tomlinson, dancer and choreographer (b. 1953)
  - Guy Webster, celebrity photographer (b. 1939)
- February 6
  - Tom Cade, ornithologist (b. 1927)
  - Yechiel Eckstein, Israeli-American rabbi, founder of International Fellowship of Christians and Jews (b. 1951)
  - Lonnie Simmons, record producer (b. 1944)
  - Anne Firor Scott, historian (b. 1921)
- February 7
  - John Tyler Bonner, biologist (b. 1920)
  - John Dingell, politician (b. 1926)
  - Mable Lee, tap dancer (b. 1921)
  - Rocky Lockridge, boxer (b. 1959)
  - Frank Robinson, baseball player, coach, and manager (b. 1935)
  - Edward Zigler, psychologist (b. 1930)
- February 8
  - Seweryn Bialer, German-born political scientist (b. 1926)
  - Fernando Clavijo, Uruguayan-born soccer player, and manager (b. 1956)
  - Dick Kempthorn, football player and businessman (b. 1926)
  - Bert McKasy, politician (b. 1941)
  - Walter Munk, Austrian-born oceanographer (b. 1917)
  - Wolfgang Rindler, Austrian-born physicist (b. 1924)
  - Robert Ryman, painter (b. 1930)
- February 9
  - Jerry Casale, baseball player (b. 1933)
  - Nicholas Kafoglis, politician (b. 1929)
  - Shelley Lubben, adult film actress and anti-pornography activist (b. 1968)
  - Ron W. Miller, businessman, CEO of the Walt Disney Company (b. 1933)
  - Patricia Nell Warren, novelist, poet, and journalist (b. 1936)
  - Milt Welch, baseball player (b. 1924)
  - Bruce Williams, radio host (b. 1932)
- February 10
  - Carmen Argenziano, actor (b. 1943)
  - Walter B. Jones Jr., politician (b. 1943)
  - Jan-Michael Vincent, actor (b. 1944)
- February 11
  - Ben Abell, meteorologist (b. 1932)
  - Winslow Briggs, plant biologist (b. 1928)
  - Jack Crimian, baseball player (b. 1926)
  - Harvey Scales, soul singer and songwriter (b. 1940)
  - Lou Sossamon, football player (b. 1921)
- February 12
  - Betty Ballantine, British-born book publisher (b. 1919)
  - Jean E. Fairfax, educator (b. 1920)
  - David Forden, intelligence officer (b. 1930)
  - W. E. B. Griffin, writer (b. 1929)
  - Lyndon LaRouche, political activist, founder of the LaRouche movement (b. 1936)
  - Pedro Morales, Puerto Rican Hall of Fame professional wrestler (WWA, WWWF) and commentator (WWF Superstars) (b. 1942)
- February 13
  - Paul Cain, Pentecostal minister (b. 1929)
  - Greg Alyn Carlson, criminal (b. 1971)
  - Jack Coghill, politician (b. 1925)
  - Edith Iglauer, writer (b. 1917)
  - Connie Jones, jazz trumpeter (b. 1934)
  - Christopher Knopf, screenwriter and union executive (b. 1927)
  - Joyce Anne Noel, beauty queen and First Lady of Rhode Island (b. 1932)
  - Ray Price, speechwriter (b. 1930)
  - Jimmy Turman, politician (b. 1927)
  - Ted Tsukiyama, attorney and bonsai enthusiast (b. 1920)
- February 14
  - Tommy Giordano, baseball player (b. 1925)
  - David Horowitz, consumer reporter and journalist (b. 1937)
  - Rocky Krsnich, baseball player (b. 1927)
  - Neil Papiano, lawyer (b. 1934)
  - Clinton Wheeler, basketball player (b. 1959)
- February 15
  - Sal Artiaga, baseball executive (b. 1946)
  - Ellis Avery, writer (b. 1972)
  - Thomas Bruice, biochemist (b. 1925)
  - Kofi Burbridge, rock multi-instrumentalist (b. 1961)
  - Efrain Chacurian, Argentine-born soccer player (b. 1924)
  - Thomas Joseph Costello, Roman Catholic prelate (b. 1929)
  - Siegfried Engelmann, educationist (b. 1931)
  - Richard N. Gardner, diplomat (b. 1927)
  - Gene Littler, Hall of Fame professional golfer (b. 1930)
  - Lee Radziwiłł, socialite (b. 1933)
  - Dave Smith, archivist (b. 1940)
- February 16
  - Sam Bass, motorsports artist (b. 1961)
  - Don Bragg, pole vaulter (b. 1935)
  - Patrick Caddell, pollster (b. 1950)
  - Jeffrey Hart, cultural critic (b. 1930)
  - Thomas R. Kane, engineer (b. 1924)
  - Ken Nordine, voice-over and recording artist (b. 1920)
  - Theodore Isaac Rubin, psychiatrist (b. 1934)
  - Shelly Saltman, sports promoter (b. 1931)
- February 17
  - Ethel Ennis, jazz singer (b. 1932)
  - Alberto Gutman, Cuban-born politician (b. 1958)
  - Eric P. Hamp, linguist (b. 1920)
  - Bill Jenkins, epidemiologist (b. 1945)
  - George Mendonça, sailor, claimant to V-J Day kiss (b. 1923)
  - Sean Milliken, reality television actor (b. 1989)
- February 18
  - Wallace Smith Broecker, geophysicist (b. 1931)
  - O'Neal Compton, actor (b. 1950)
  - T. J. Cunningham, football player (b. 1972)
  - Stewart Dalzell, judge (b. 1943)
  - Skip Groff, record producer and DJ (b. 1948)
  - Louise Manoogian Simone, philanthropist (b. 1933)
  - George Springer, mathematician and computer scientist (b. 1924)
  - Russell Sugarmon, judge and politician (b. 1929)
  - John Traupman, classical scholar (b. 1922)
- February 19
  - Dick Boushka, basketball player (b. 1934)
  - Paul Janeczko, poet and anthologist (b. 1945)
  - Don Newcombe, baseball player (b. 1926)
  - Artie Wayne, musician, songwriter and record producer (B. 1942)
  - Stanley Wolpert, Indologist (b. 1927)
- February 20
  - Dominick Argento, composer (b. 1927)
  - Mark Bramble, theatre director and producer (b. 1950)
  - William Broomfield, politician (b. 1922)
  - John P. Flaherty Jr., judge (b. 1931)
  - Fred Foster, Hall of Fame record producer and songwriter (b. 1931)
  - Joe Gibbon, baseball player (b. 1935)
  - Bob Griggs, cartoonist and TV host (b. 1933)
  - Augustus Richard Norton, professor (b. 1946)
  - Vinny Vella, actor and comedian (b. 1946)
- February 21
  - Gus Backus, doo-wop and schlager singer (b. 1937)
  - Nick Cafardo, sports journalist (b. 1956)
  - Sue Casey, actress (b. 1926)
  - Stanley Donen, film director (b. 1924)
  - Beverley Owen, actress (b. 1937)
  - Jackie Shane, singer (b. 1940)
  - Peter Tork, musician and actor (The Monkees) (b. 1942)
- February 22
  - Jeff Adachi, attorney (b. 1959)
  - Frank Ballance, politician and convicted criminal (b. 1941)
  - Victor J. Banis, author (b. 1936)
  - Clark James Gable, actor and television host (b. 1988)
  - Brody Stevens, actor and comedian (b. 1970)
  - Morgan Woodward, actor (b. 1925)
- February 23
  - Ron Avery, sport shooter (b. 1956)
  - Ira Gitler, jazz historian and journalist (b. 1928)
  - Katherine Helmond, actress (b. 1929)
  - Carl Meinhold, basketball player (b. 1926)
- February 24
  - Donald Keene, American-born Japanese historian and writer (b. 1922)
  - T. Jack Lee, engineer (b. 1935)
  - Carrie Ann Lucas, disability rights advocate and attorney (b. 1971)
  - Arthur Pardee, biochemist (b. 1921)
  - Richard S. Wheeler, writer and newspaper editor (b. 1935)
  - Mac Wiseman, bluegrass musician (b. 1925)
- February 25
  - Janet Asimov, science fiction writer, psychiatrist, and psychoanalyst (b. 1926)
  - Fred Gloden, football player (b. 1918)
  - Kathleen O'Malley, actress (b. 1924)
  - Jeraldine Saunders, writer and astrologer (b. 1923)
  - Lisa Sheridan, actress (b. 1974)
- February 26
  - Harry F. Barnes, judge (b. 1932)
  - Mickey Channell, politician (b. 1942)
  - Mitzi Hoag, actress (b. 1932)
  - Charles McCarry, novelist (b. 1930)
  - Patrick McCarthy, fashion magazine publisher and editor (b. 1951)
  - Dennis Richardson, politician (b. 1949)
  - Thomas L. Shaffer, legal scholar (b. 1934)
- February 27
  - Jerry Merryman, electrical engineer (b. 1932)
  - Edward Nixon, entrepreneur (b. 1930)
  - Mike Rebhan, baseball player (b. 1967)
  - Nathaniel Taylor, actor (b. 1938)
  - Willie Williams, athlete (b. 1931)
- February 28
  - Lewis Aron, psychoanalyst (b. 1952)
  - Joe Girard, salesman and author (b. 1928)
  - Sarah Lee Lippincott, astronomer (b. 1920)
  - Norma Paulus, lawyer and politician (b. 1933)
  - André Previn, German-born composer and score adapter (b. 1929)
  - Elliot Griffin Thomas, Roman Catholic prelate and Bishop (b. 1926)

== March ==
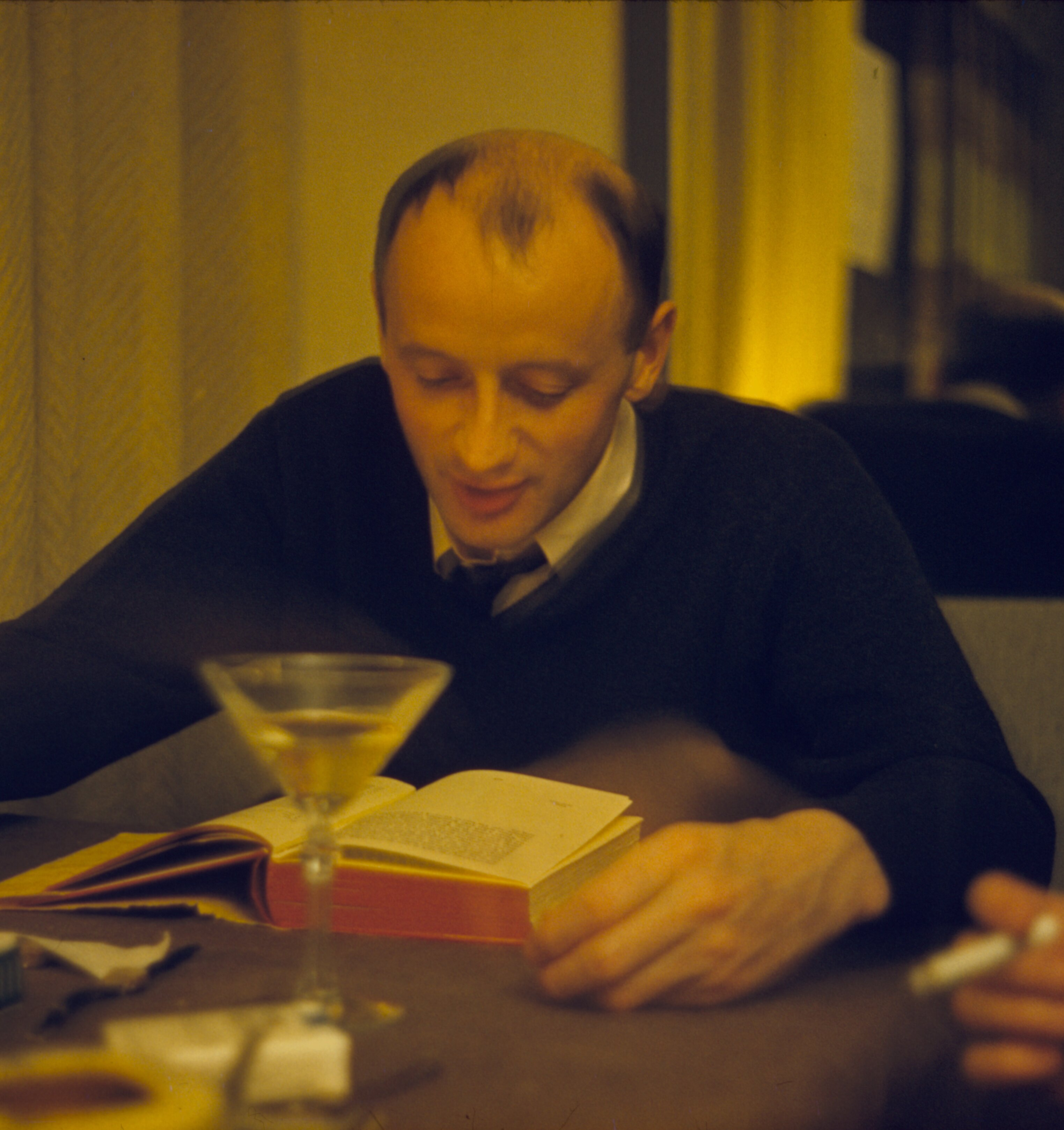
Kevin Roche

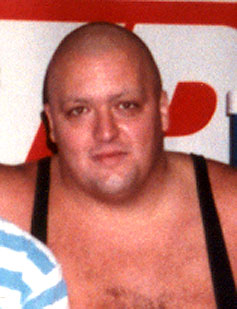
King Kong Bundy

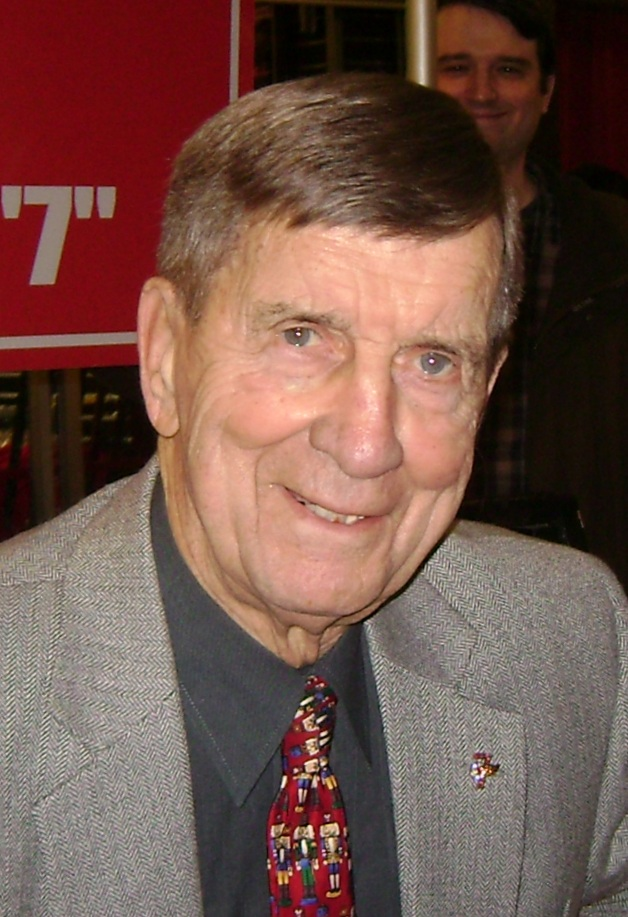
Ted Lindsay

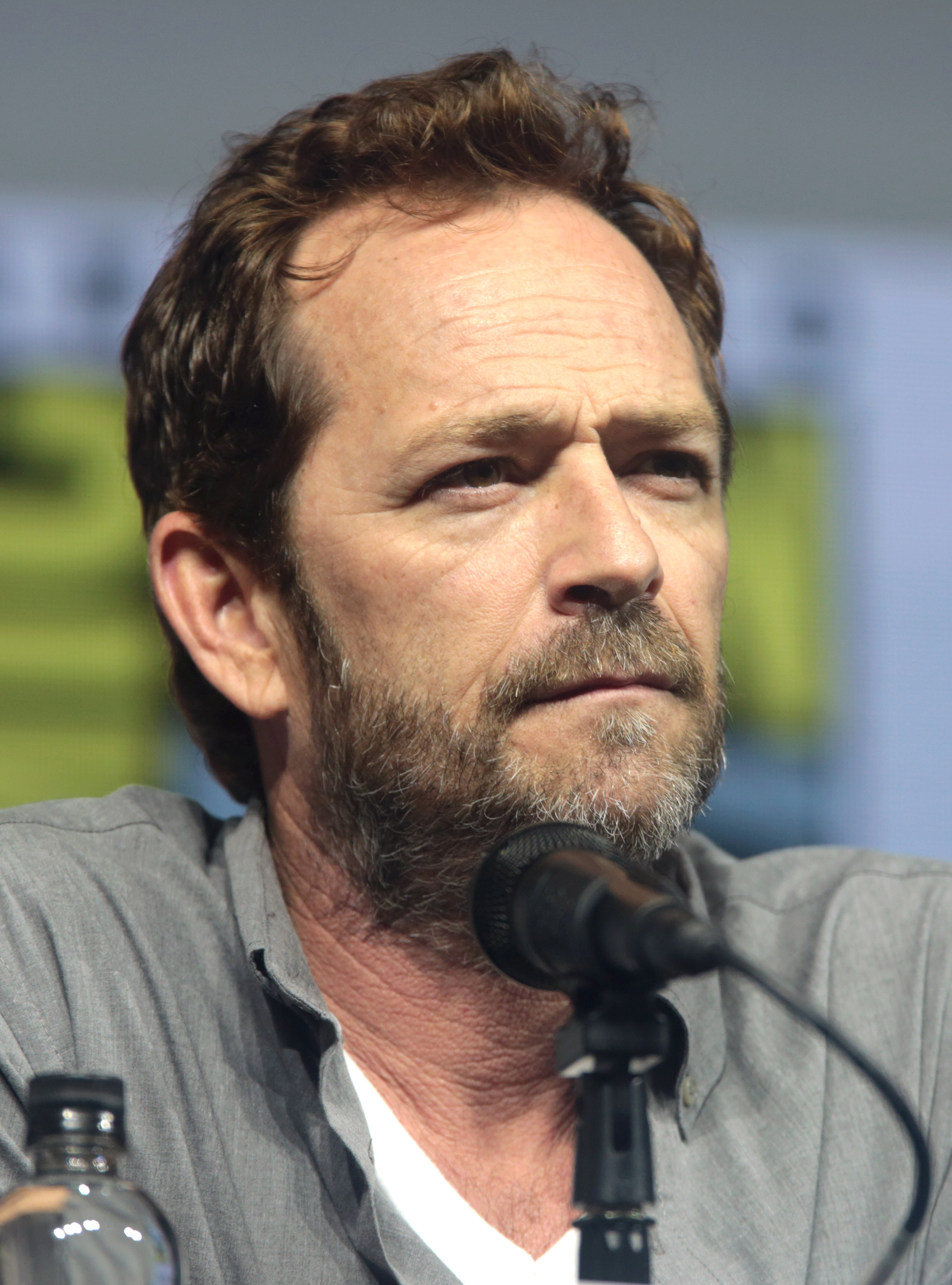
Luke Perry

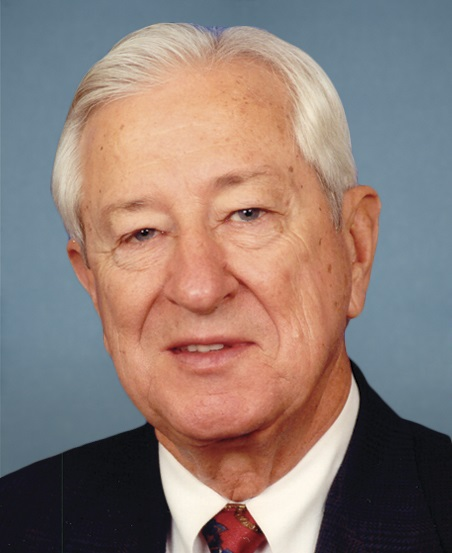
Ralph Hall

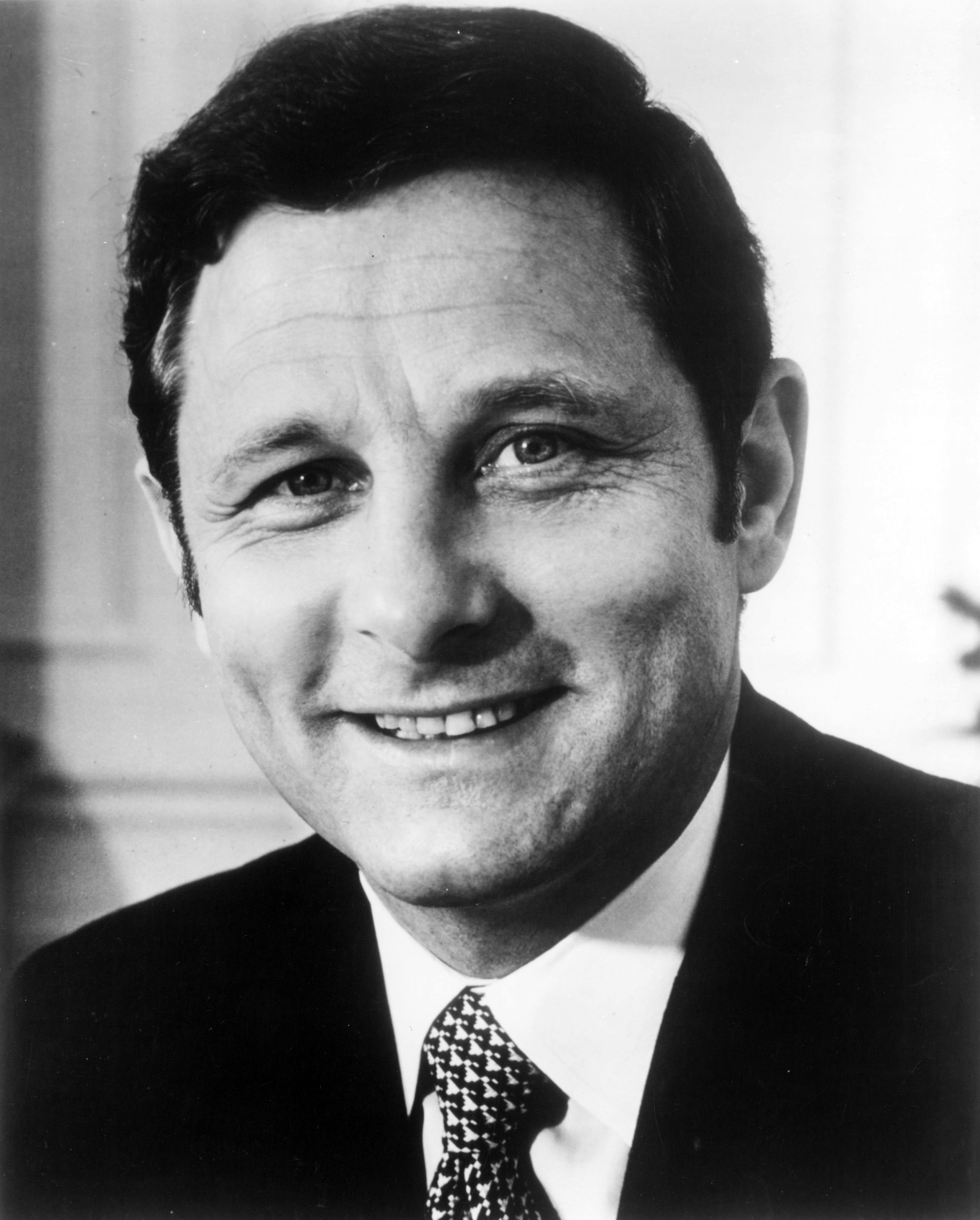
Birch Bayh

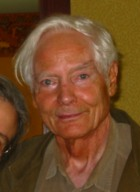
W. S. Merwin

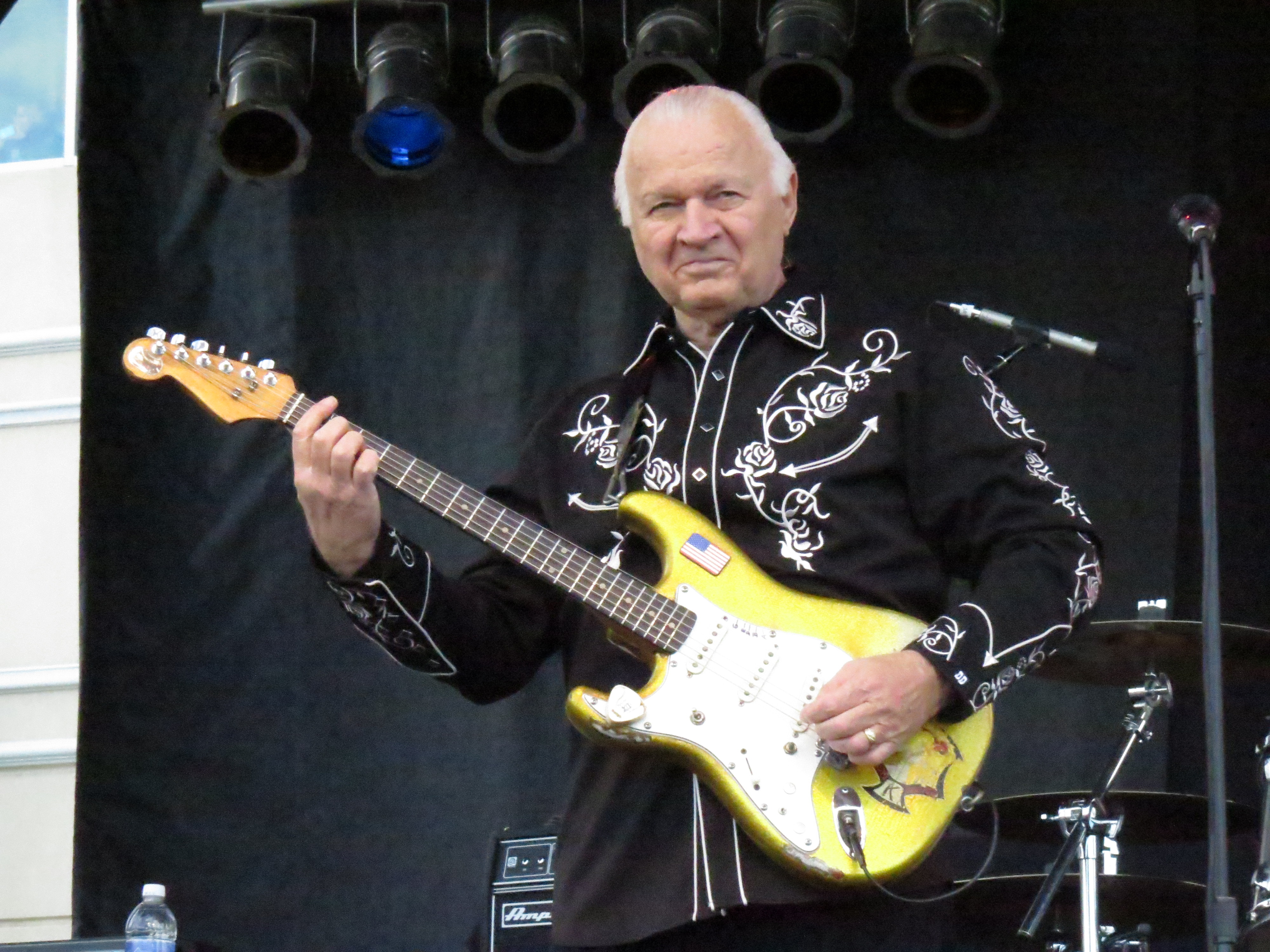
Dick Dale

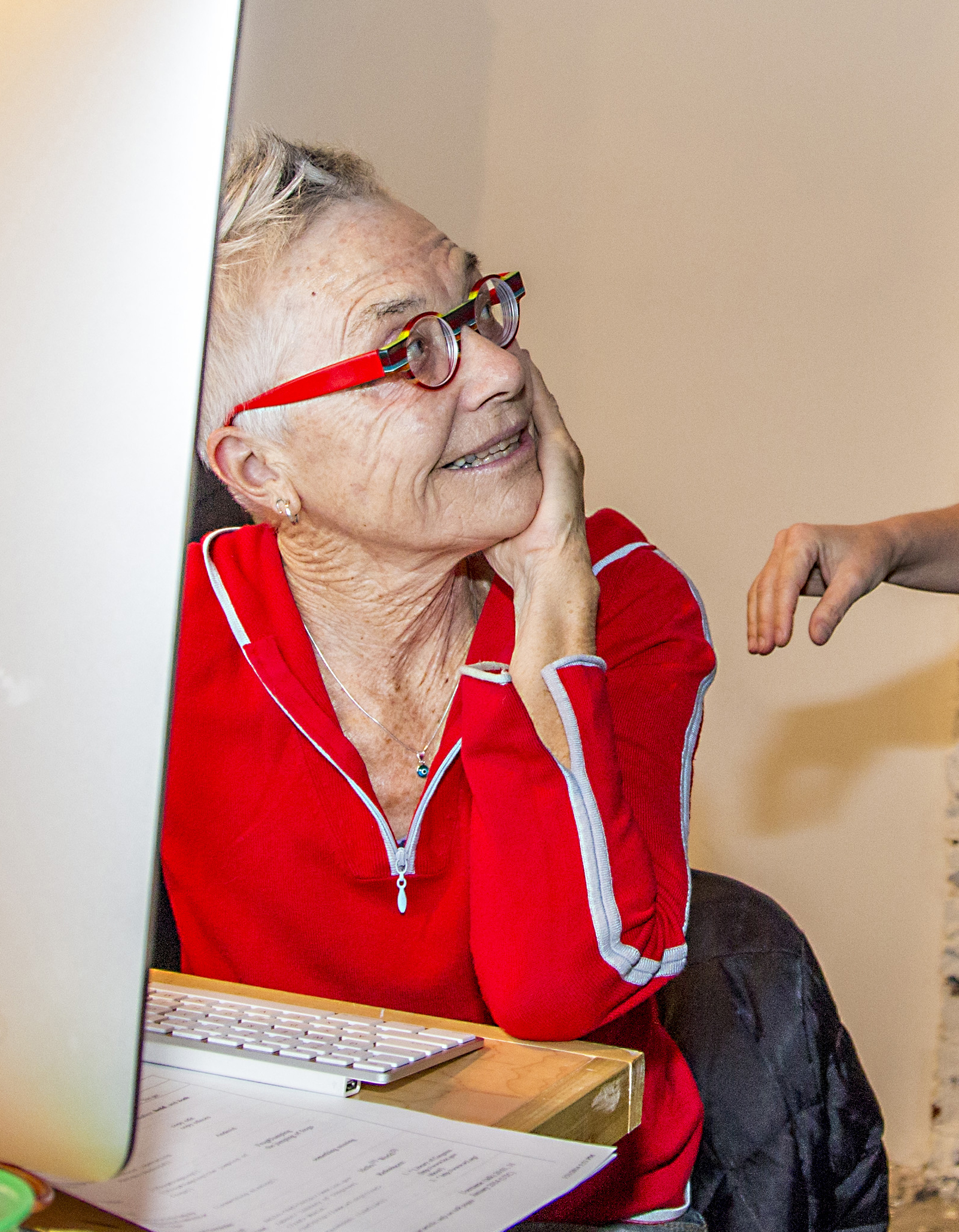
Barbara Hammer

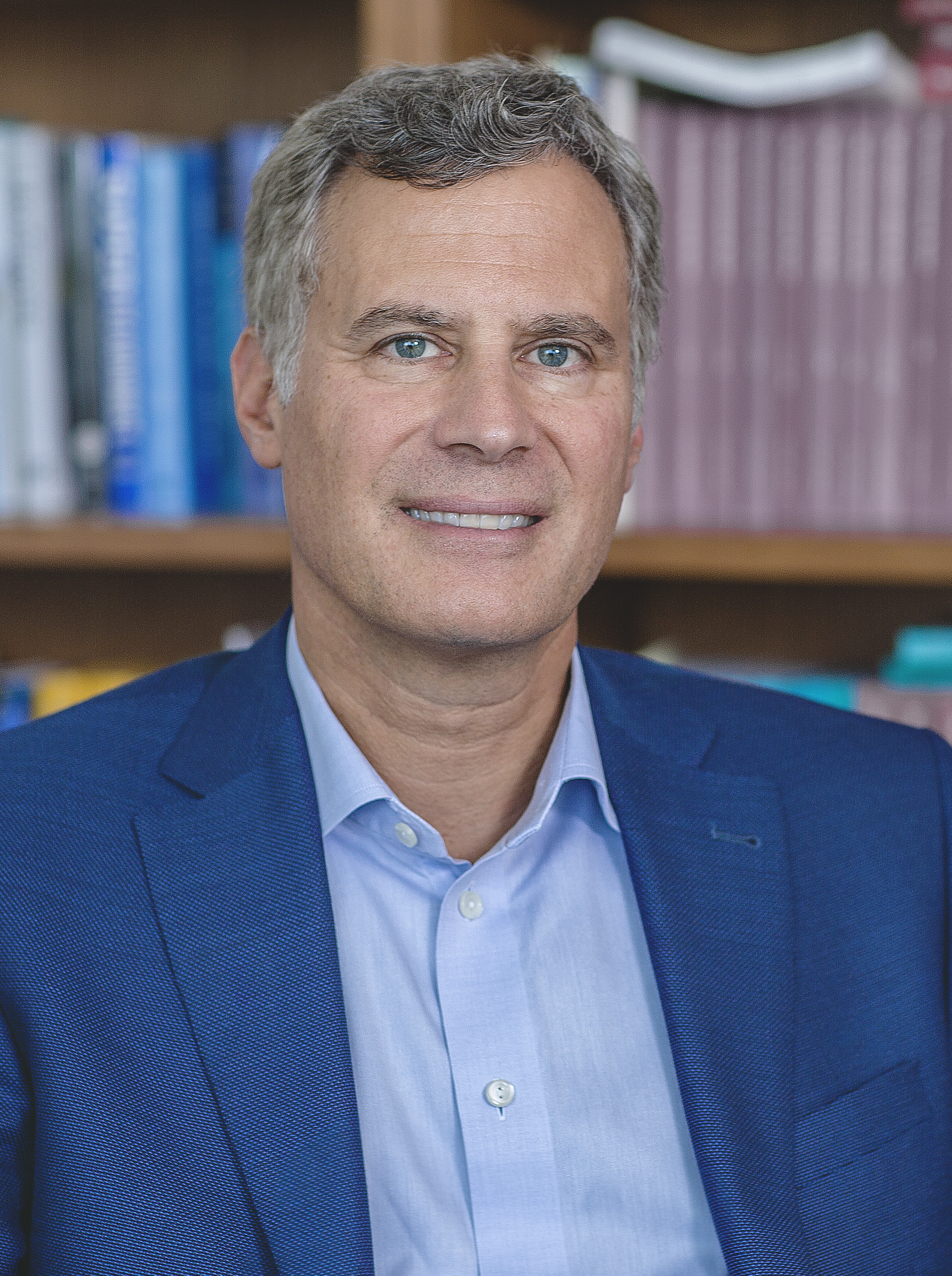
Alan Krueger

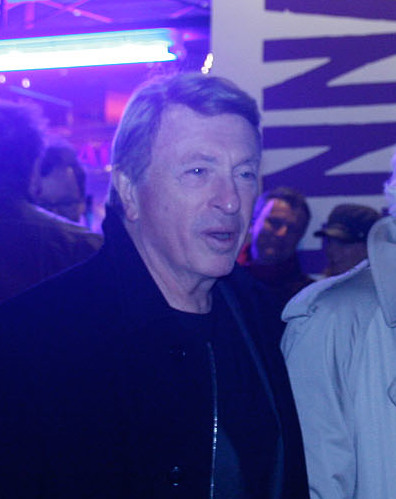
Larry Cohen

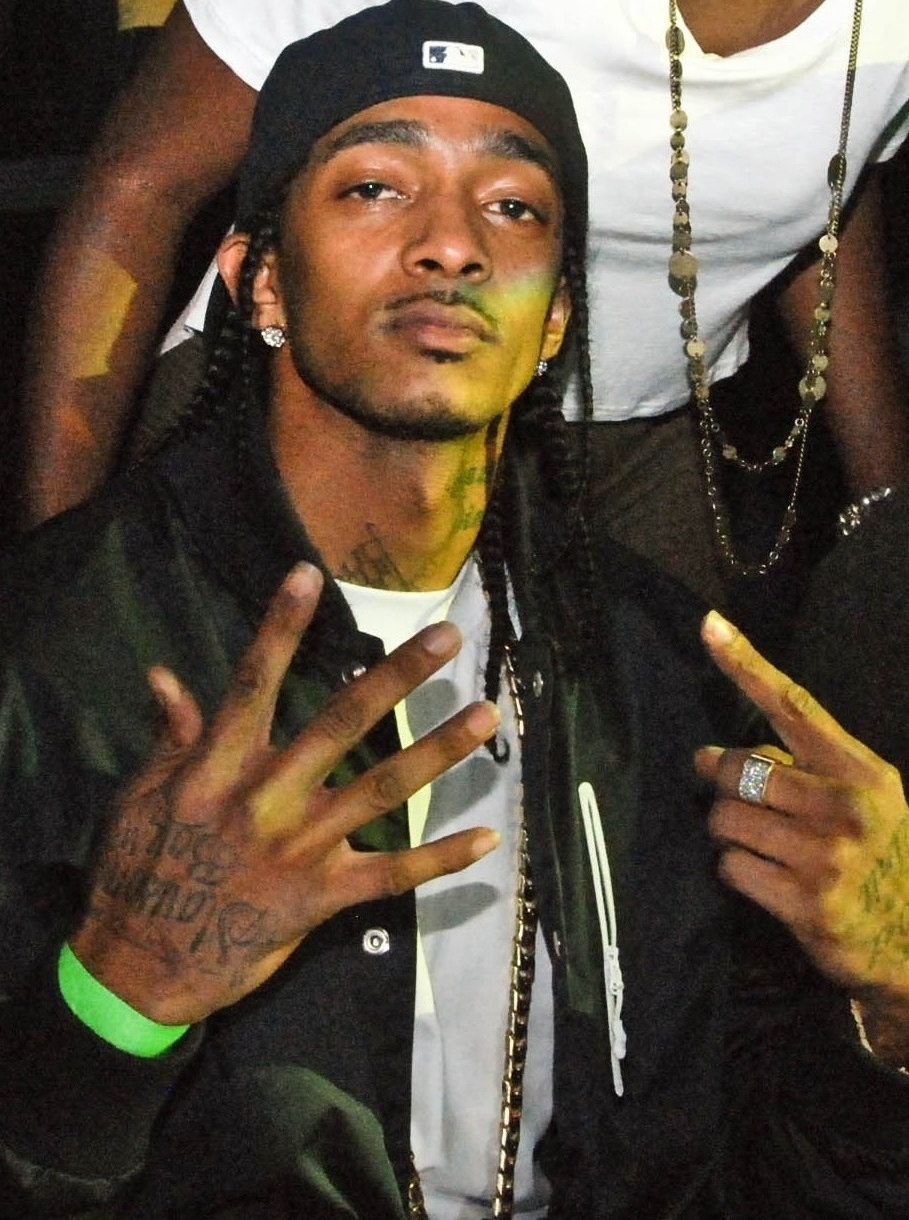
Nipsey Hussle

- March 1
  - Joseph Flummerfelt, conductor (b. 1936)
  - Kevin Roche, Irish-born architect (b. 1922)
  - Robert S. Summers, legal scholar (b. 1933)
- March 2
  - Jack Gregory, football player (b. 1944)
  - Fred Hill, baseball coach (b. 1934)
  - Ed Keats, rear admiral (b. 1915)
  - Keith Harvey Miller, politician (b. 1925)
  - Ogden Reid, publisher, diplomat, and politician (b. 1925)
- March 3
  - Tom Bass, politician (b. 1926)
  - Harry Joseph Bowman, criminal (b. 1949)
  - Kyle Forti, political consultant (b. 1989)
  - Roger W. Titus, judge (b. 1941)
- March 4
  - King Kong Bundy, professional wrestler and actor (b. 1955)
  - Juan Corona, Mexican serial killer (b. 1934)
  - Wilbur Cross, author (b. 1918)
  - Robert DeProspero, Secret Service agent (b. 1938)
  - Ted Lindsay, Canadian Hall of Fame ice hockey player (b. 1925)
  - Luke Perry, actor (b. 1966)
  - Sara Romweber, rock drummer (b. 1963)
  - Sidney Verba, political scientist, librarian, and library administrator (b. 1932)
- March 6
  - James Dapogny, jazz musicologist and pianist (b. 1940)
  - Carolee Schneemann, visual artist (b. 1939)
- March 7
  - Dick Beyer, professional wrestler (b. 1930)
  - Joseph H. Boardman, railroad executive (b. 1948)
  - Ralph Hall, politician (b. 1923)
  - Dan Jenkins, sportswriter (b. 1928)
  - Dick Nichols, politician (b. 1926)
  - Carmine Persico, mobster and convicted racketeer (b. 1933)
  - Sidney Sheinberg, lawyer and studio executive (b. 1934)
- March 8
  - Marshall Brodien, magician and actor (b. 1934)
  - Kelly Catlin, Olympic athlete (b. 1995)
  - Cedrick Hardman, football player (b. 1948)
  - Frank Joranko, football and baseball player and coach (b. 1930)
  - Mel Miller, lawyer and politician (b. 1948)
  - George Morfogen, actor (b. 1933)
  - Eddie Taylor Jr., blues singer and guitarist (b. 1972)
- March 9
  - Jed Allan, actor (b. 1935)
  - Joe Auer, football player (b. 1941)
  - Freeda Foreman, boxer, daughter of George Foreman (b. 1976)
- March 10
  - Asa Brebner, guitarist, singer and songwriter (b. 1953)
  - Karl Eller, businessman (b. 1927)
  - Russell Gary, football player (b. 1959)
  - Raven Grimassi, Wiccan priest and author (b. 1951)
  - Charlie Karp, musician, songwriter and Emmy-winning documentarian (b. 1953)
  - Eric Moss, football player (b. 1974)
  - William Powers Jr., educator (b. 1946)
- March 11 – Hal Blaine, drummer (b. 1928)
- March 12
  - John Bardo, educator (b. 1948)
  - John Kilzer, singer and songwriter (b. 1957)
  - Joseph C. Miller, historian (b. 1939)
  - Marjorie W. Sharmat, author (b. 1928)
  - Joffre Stewart, beat poet and anarchist (b. 1925)
- March 13
  - Frank Cali, mobster, head of Gambino crime family (b. 1965)
  - Leroy Stanton, baseball player (b. 1946)
- March 14
  - Birch Bayh, politician (b. 1922)
  - Ralph Metzner, German-born psychologist, writer and researcher (b. 1936)
- March 15 – W. S. Merwin, poet (b. 1927)
- March 16
  - Dick Dale, rock guitarist known as The King of the Surf Guitar (b. 1937)
  - Larry DiTillio, television writer (b. 1948)
  - Richard Erdman, actor (b. 1925)
  - Barbara Hammer, filmmaker (b. 1939)
  - Alan Krueger, economist and advisor to President Barack Obama (b. 1960)
- March 17
  - Ken Bald, illustrator and comic book artist (b. 1920)
  - Barbara Benary, composer and ethnomusicologist (b. 1946)
  - Norman Hollyn, film and television editor (b. 1952)
  - Andre Williams, R&B singer and songwriter (b. 1936)
- March 18
  - John Carl Buechler, visual effects artist and film director (b. 1952)
  - Jerrie Cobb, aviator (b. 1930)
  - Roger Kirby, professional wrestler (b. 1939)
- March 19
  - Chuck Harmon, baseball player (b. 1924)
  - George W. Lindberg, judge (b. 1932)
  - Bill Phelps, politician (b. 1934)
- March 20
  - Joseph Victor Adamec, Roman Catholic prelate (b. 1935)
  - Betty G. Bailey, artist (b. 1939)
  - Eunetta T. Boone, television writer and producer (b. 1956)
  - Linda Gregg, poet (b. 1942)
  - Randy Jackson, baseball player (b. 1925)
- March 21
  - John Bersia, writer (b. 1956)
  - Anthony Dickerson, football player (b. 1957)
  - Roger Moore, computer scientist and philanthropist (b. 1939)
  - Francis Quinn, Roman Catholic prelate (b. 1921)
- March 22 – Arlen Ness, motorcycle designer and entrepreneur (b. 1939)
- March 23
  - Larry Cohen, film director, producer and screenwriter (b. 1936)
  - Clem Daniels, football player (b. 1937)
  - Howard V. Lee, soldier, Medal of Honor recipient (b. 1933)
- March 24
  - Nancy Gates, actress (b. 1926)
  - Fred Malek, business executive, political advisor and philanthropist (b. 1936)
- March 25
  - Jean Price, politician (b. 1943)
  - Jerry Schypinski, baseball player (b. 1931)
  - Sydel Silverman, anthropologist (b. 1933)
  - Bill Thompson III, ornithologist and publisher (b. 1962)
  - Lyle Tuttle, tattoo artist (b. 1931)
- March 26 – W. H. Pugmire, writer (b. 1951)
- March 27 – Joe Bellino, football player (b. 1938)
- March 28 – Henry Stern, politician and government official (b. 1935)
- March 29 – Ed Westcott, photographer (b. 1922)
- March 30 – Truman Lowe, artist (b. 1943)
- March 31 – Nipsey Hussle (Ermias Davidson Asghedom), rapper and songwriter (b. 1985)

== April ==
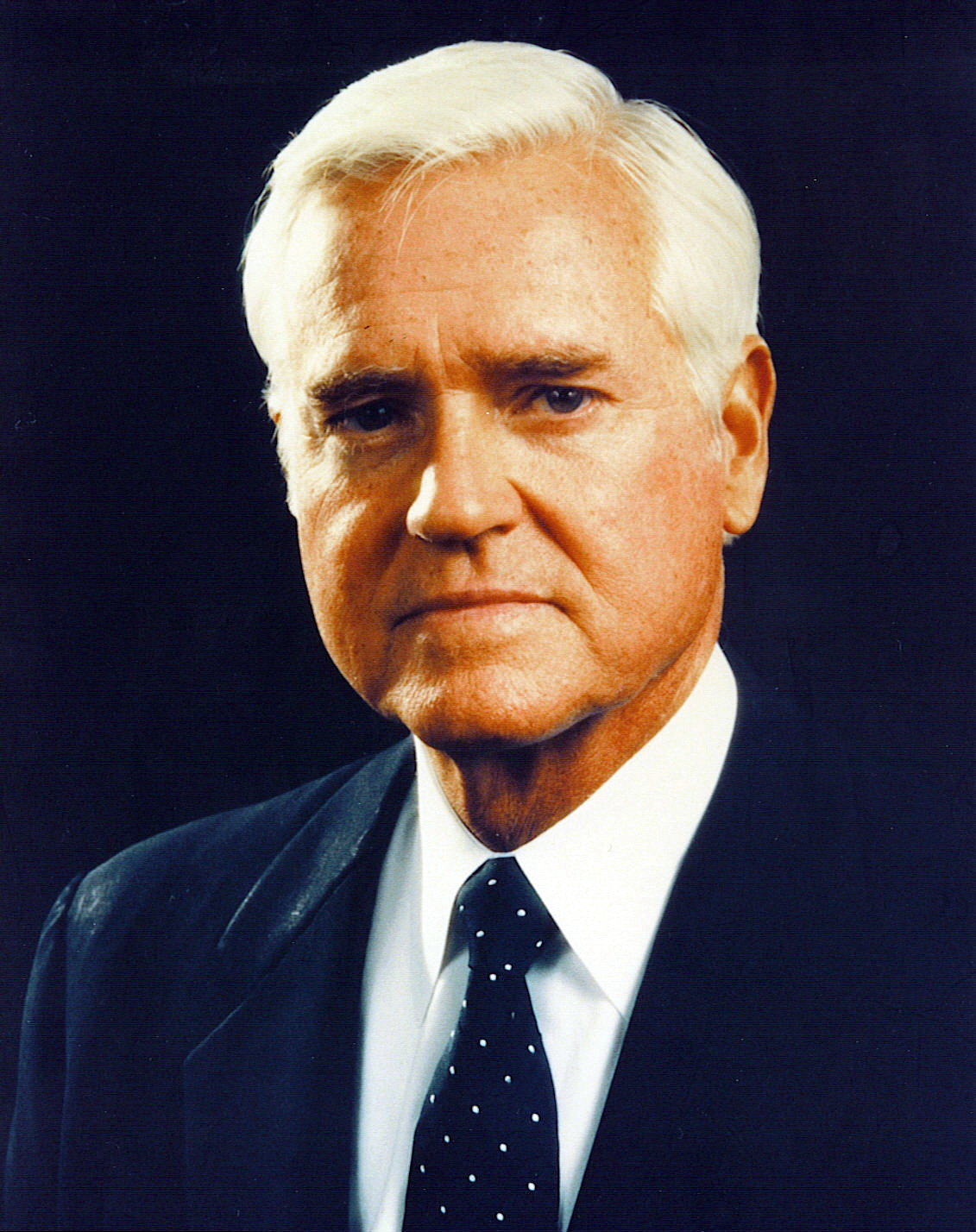
Fritz Hollings

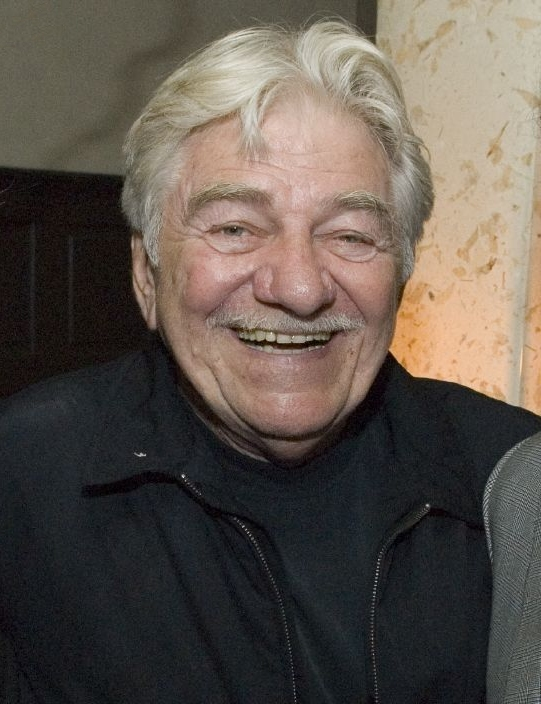
Seymour Cassel

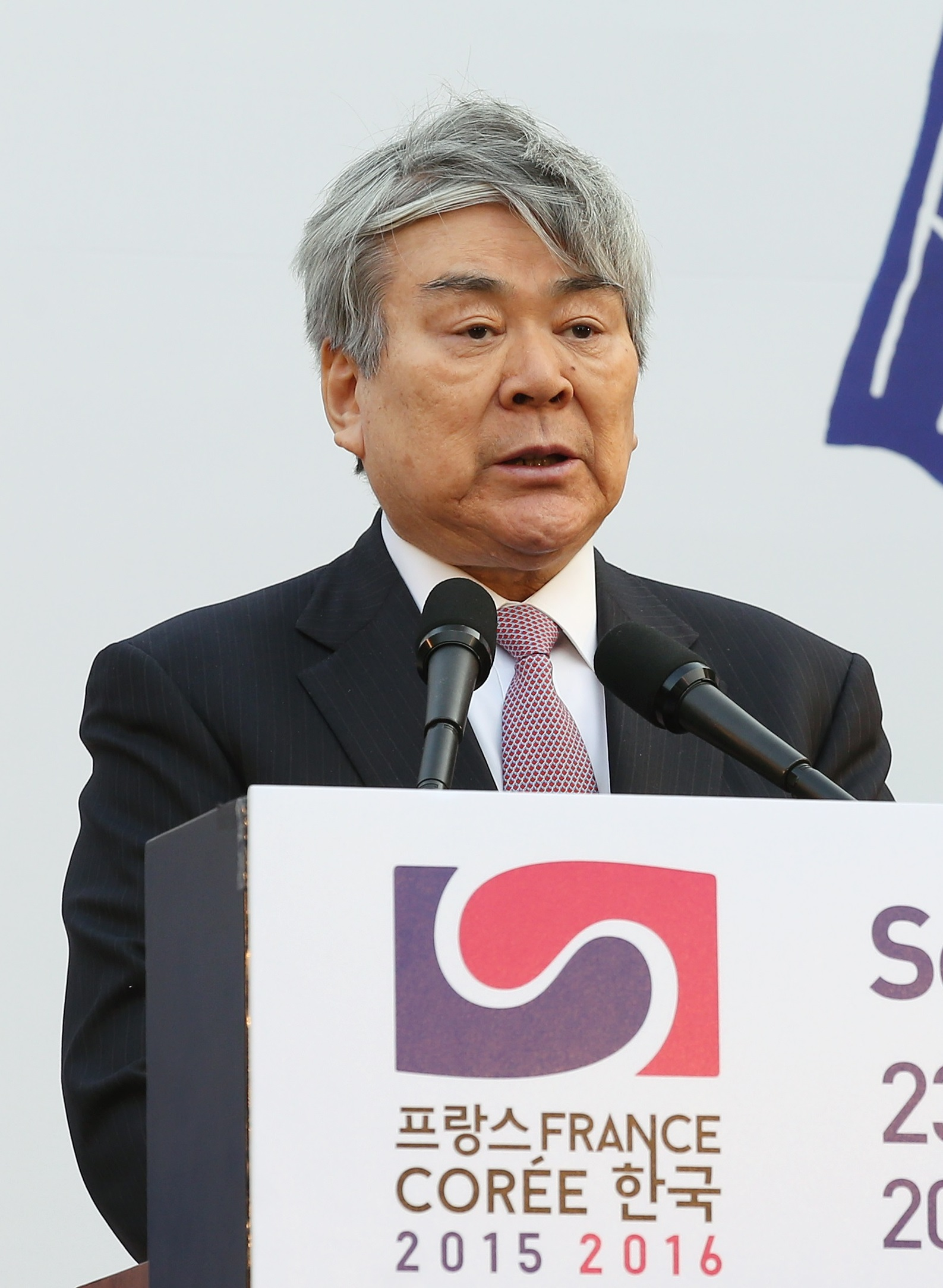
Cho Yang-ho

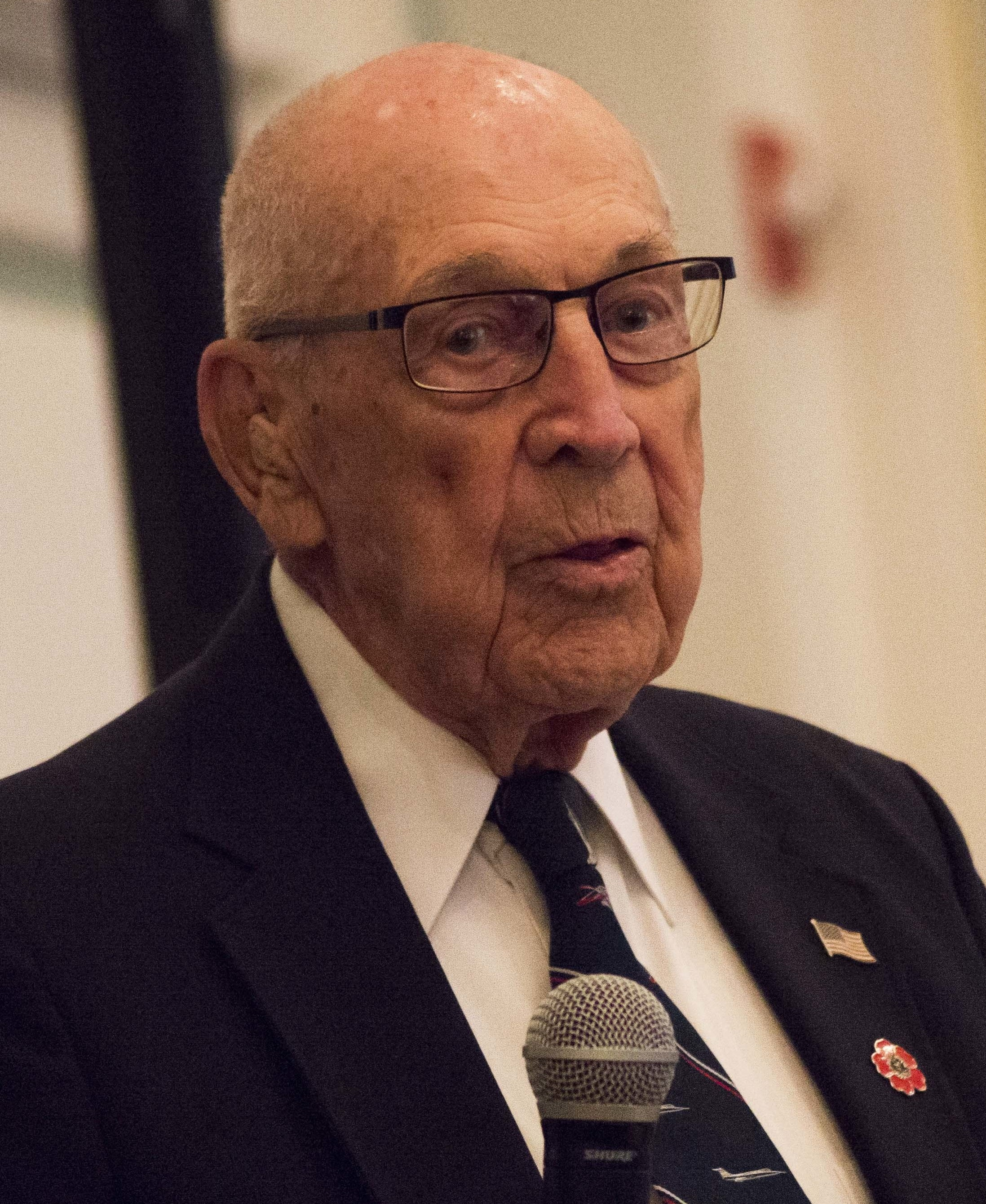
Richard E. Cole

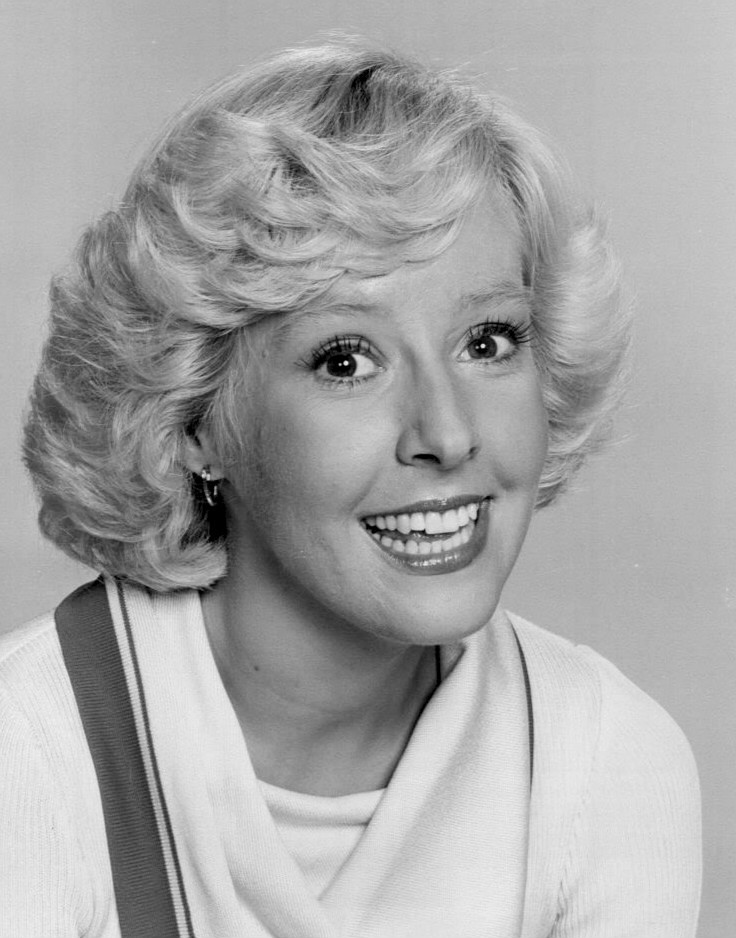
Georgia Engel

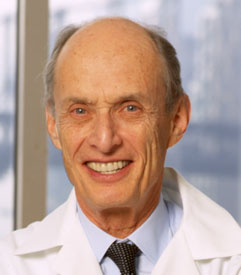
Paul Greengard

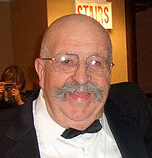
Gene Wolfe

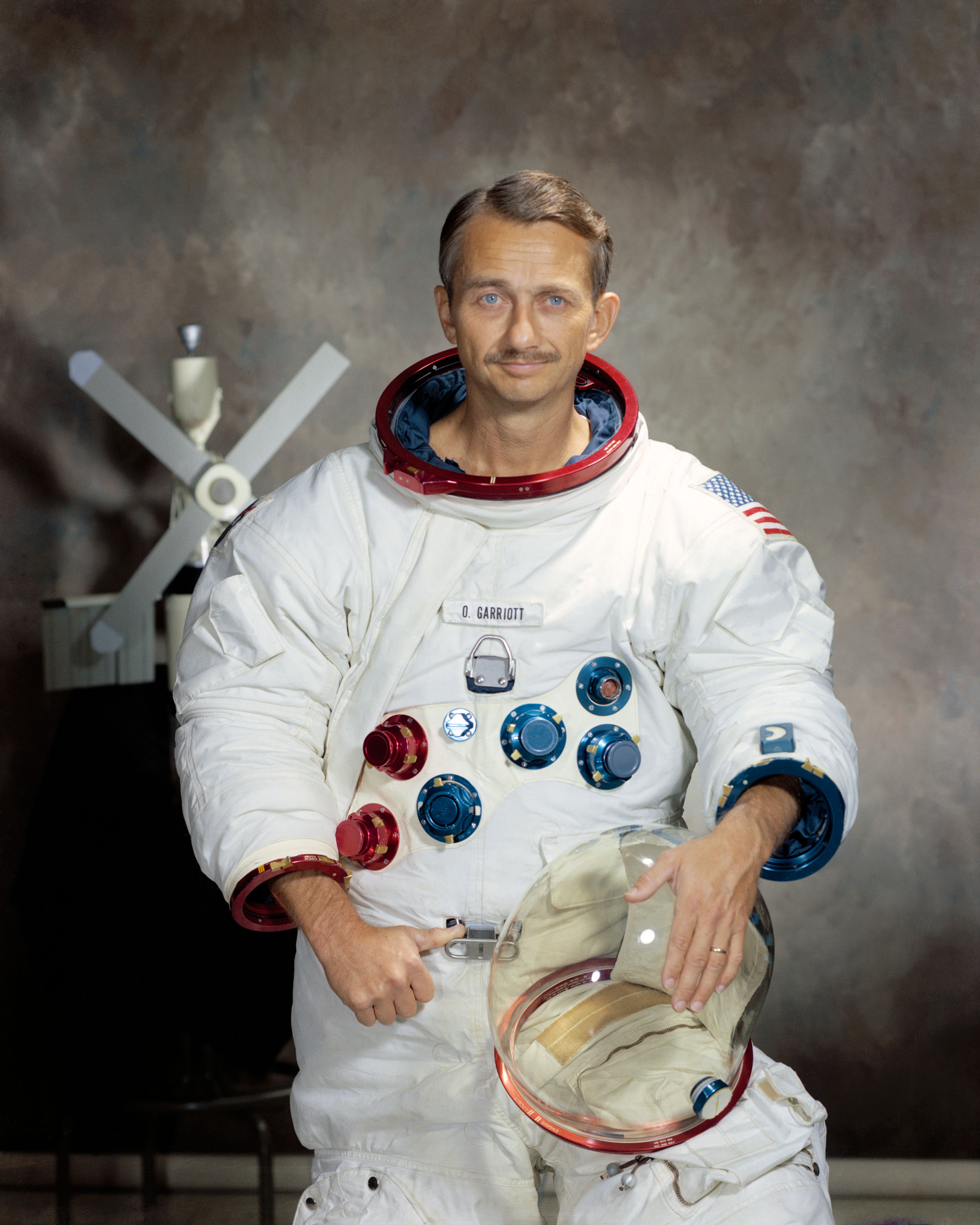
Owen Garriott

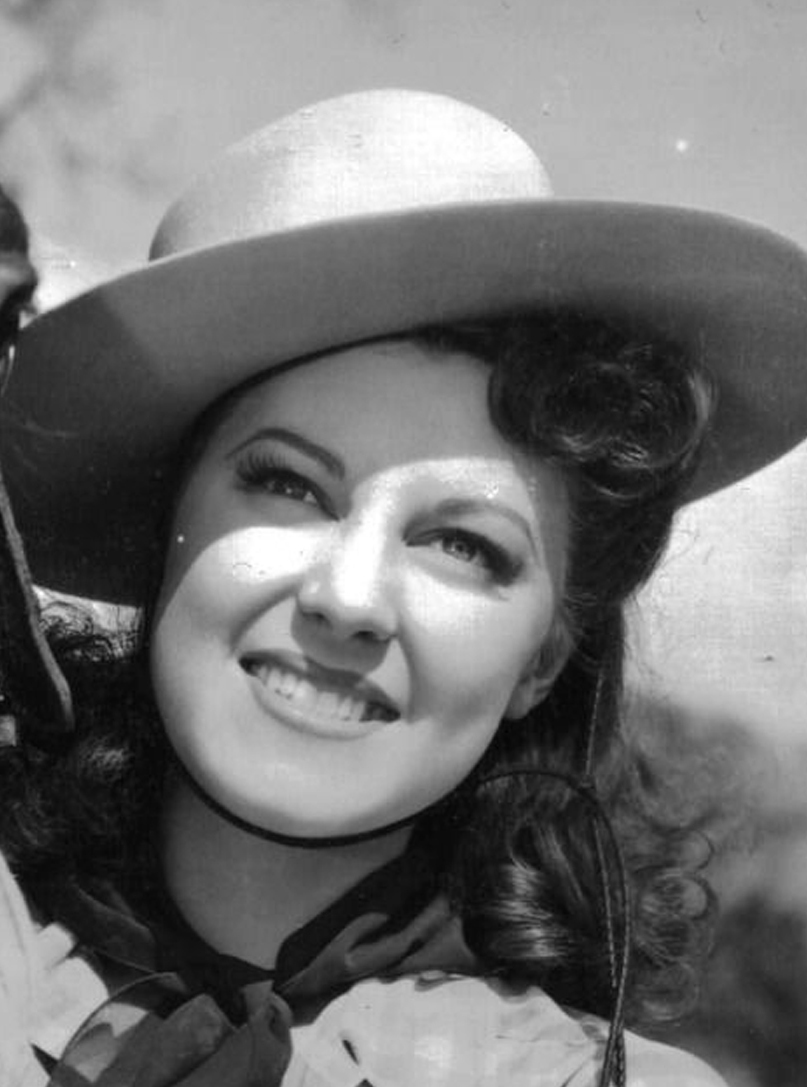
Fay McKenzie

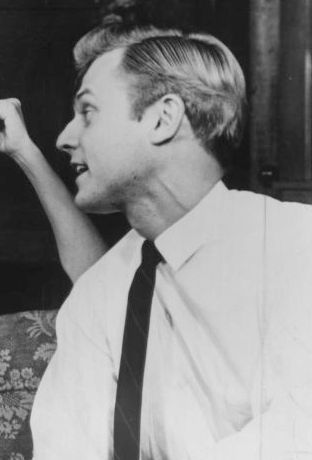
Ken Kercheval

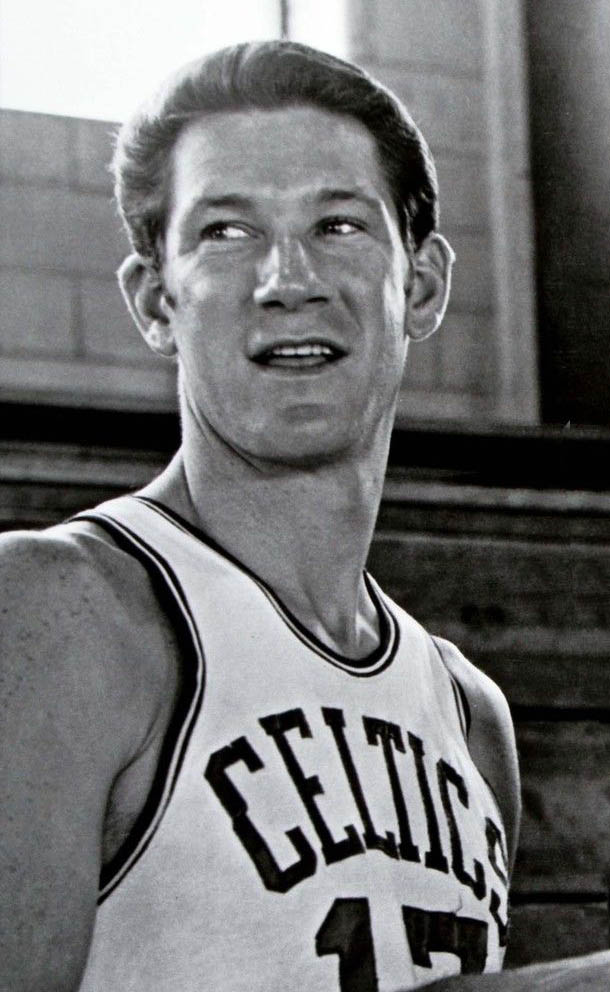
John Havlicek

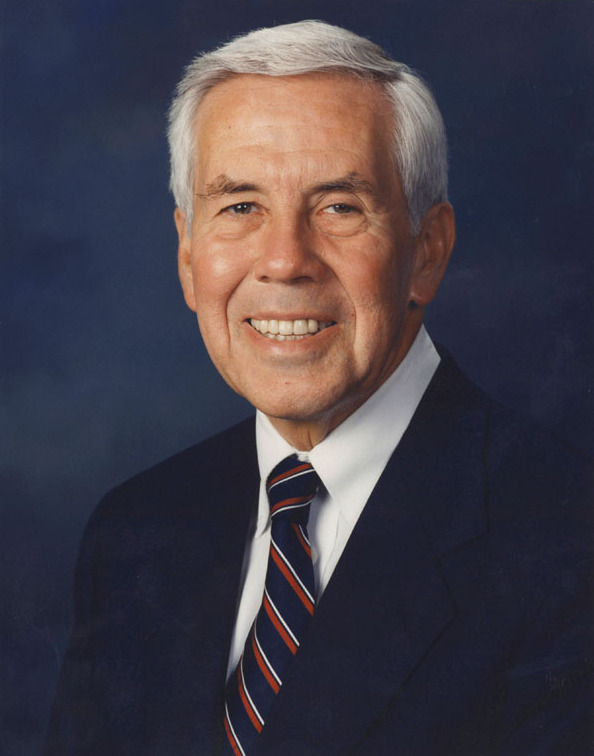
Richard Lugar

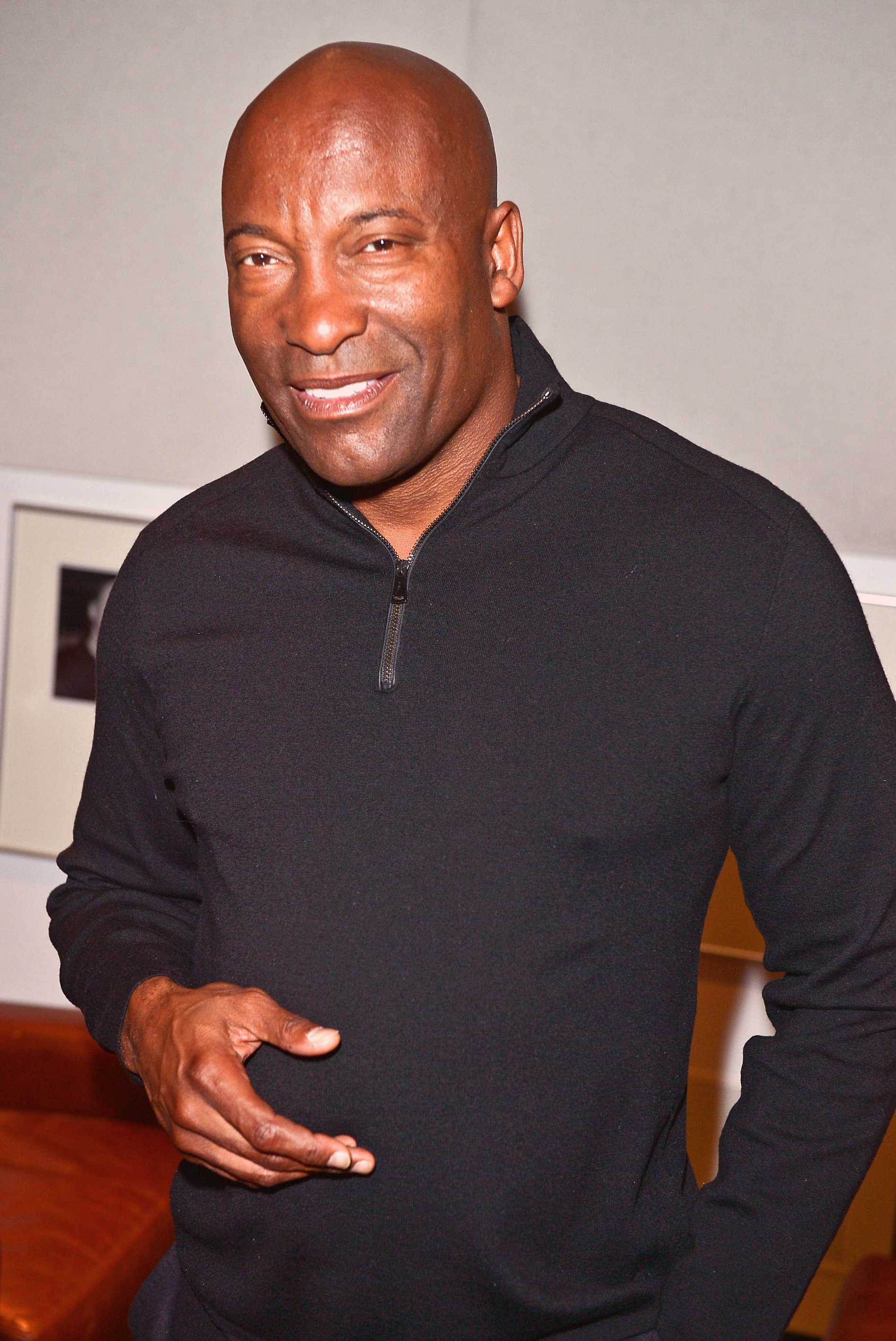
John Singleton

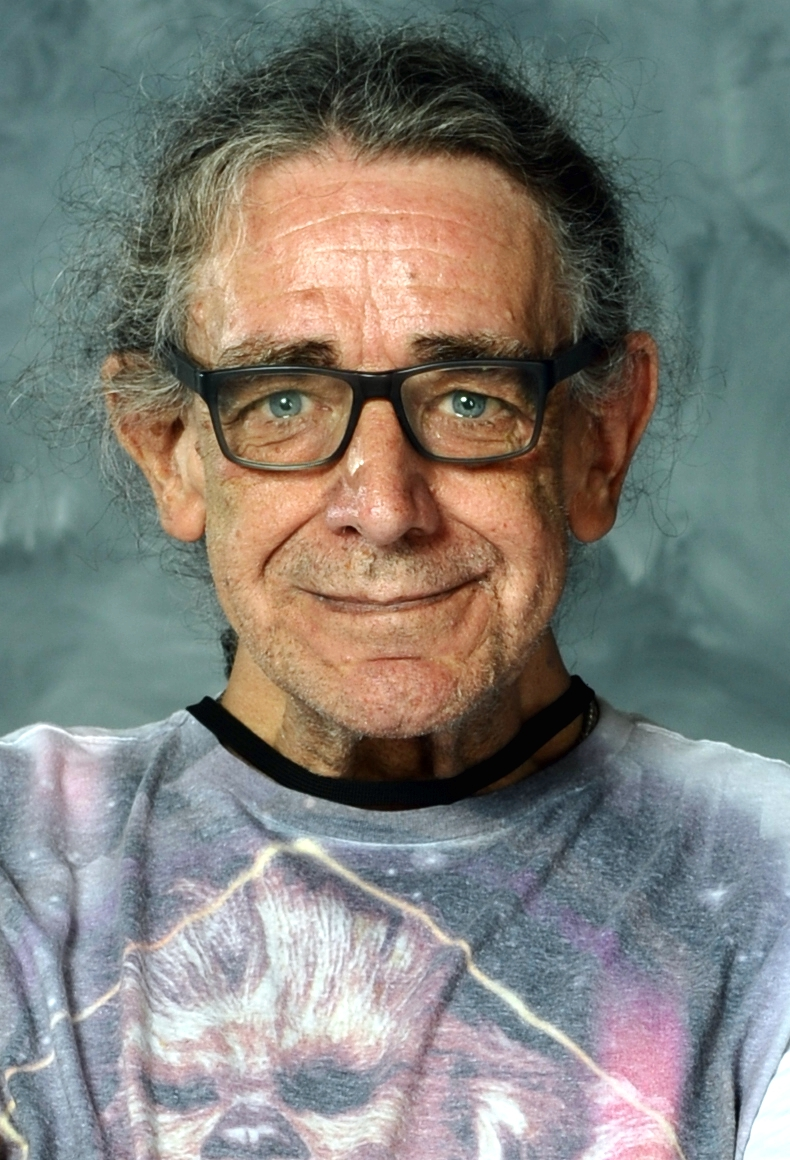
Peter Mayhew

- April 1
  - Dixie Allen, politician (b. 1934)
  - Bucky McConnell, basketball player (b. 1928)
  - Vonda N. McIntyre, science fiction author (b. 1948)
  - Ron Sweed, television host (b. 1948)
- April 2
  - Rick Elias, musician (A Ragamuffin Band) (b. 1955)
  - Kim English, house and gospel singer-songwriter (b. 1970)
  - Ken Hay, religious leader, founder of The Wilds Christian Association (b. 1933).
  - Don Williamson, businessman (Brainerd International Raceway) and politician (b. 1934)
- April 3
  - Philip Furia, author (b. 1943)
  - Daryl Hecht, judge, member of the Iowa Supreme Court (2006–2018) (b. 1952)
- April 4
  - Roberta Haynes, actress (b. 1927)
  - Barry Malkin, film editor (b. 1938)
  - Thompson Mann, swimmer, Olympic champion (b. 1942)
  - Marilyn Mason, concert organist and academic (b. 1925)
  - Tiger Merritt, singer and guitarist (Morning Teleportation) (b. 1987)
  - Arthur Polonsky, painter (b. 1925)
- April 5
  - Samuel Pilafian, tuba player (b. 1949)
  - Davey Williams, avant-garde guitarist and music critic (b. 1952)
- April 6
  - Romus Burgin, World War II veteran and author (b. 1922)
  - Paul J. Coleman, space scientist (b. 1931)
  - Louis Crump, politician (b. 1916)
  - Jim Glaser, country music artist (b. 1937)
  - Richard Green, sexologist and psychiatrist (b. 1936)
  - Fritz Hollings, politician (b. 1922)
- April 7
  - Seymour Cassel, actor (b. 1935)
  - Cho Yang-ho, South Korean businessman (b. 1949)
  - John William Ditter Jr., jurist (b. 1921)
  - William B. Murray, opera baritone (b. 1934)
  - Neil D. Opdyke, geologist (b. 1932)
  - Billy Rosen, bridge player (b. 1928)
  - Lodune Sincaid, mixed martial artist (b. 1973)
  - L. Eugene Smith, politician (b. 1921)
- April 8
  - Blase Bonpane, human rights activist (b. 1929)
  - Robert Forguites, politician (b. 1938)
  - Samuel "Bay" Taylor, baseball player (b. 1928)
- April 9
  - Elwyn Berlekamp, mathematician (b. 1940)
  - Richard E. Cole, air force officer (b. 1915)
  - James D. Hudnall, comic book writer (b. 1957)
  - Marilynn Smith, professional golfer (b. 1929)
  - Charles Van Doren, writer and editor (b. 1926)
- April 10 – Earl Thomas Conley, country music singer-songwriter (b. 1941)
- April 11 – Wayne Pomeroy, politician (b. 1923)
- April 12 – Georgia Engel, actress (b. 1948)
- April 13
  - Donald Ault, literary scholar (b. 1942)
  - Mark Connolly, politician (b. 1955)
  - Quentin Fiore, graphic designer (b. 1919)
  - S. Thomas Gagliano, politician (b. 1931)
  - Paul Greengard, Nobel neuroscientist (b. 1925)
  - Bud Konheim, fashion executive (b. 1935)
- April 14
  - David Brion Davis, historian (b. 1926)
  - Anne Lewis, lawyer (b. 1962)
  - John MacLeod, basketball coach (b. 1937)
  - Gene Wolfe, science fiction and fantasy writer (b. 1931)
- April 15
  - Warren Adler, author (b. 1927)
  - Jerry Clack, classics scholar (b. 1926)
  - Owen Garriott, astronaut (b. 1930)
  - Louise H. Kellogg, geophysicist (b. 1959)
  - Elaine Rapp, sculptor (b. 1927)
  - Winston L. Shelton, inventor and entrepreneur (b. 1922)
- April 16
  - Dale Denno, politician (b. 1950)
  - Kent Harris, songwriter and record producer (b. 1930)
  - Fay McKenzie, actress (b. 1918)
  - Pete Peterson, baseball player and general manager (b. 1929)
- April 17
  - Chet Coppock, broadcast journalist and sports talk personality (b. 1948)
  - Frederick Hemke, saxophonist (b. 1935)
  - James V. Schall, Jesuit Roman Catholic priest, teacher and writer (b. 1927)
- April 18
  - Samuel H. Gruber, marine biologist (b. 1938)
  - Don Melnick, biologist and conservationist (b. 1953)
  - Ira Neimark, retail executive (Bergdorf Goodman) (b. 1921)
  - Eddie Tigner, blues keyboardist, singer and songwriter (b. 1926)
  - Lorraine Warren, demonologist and paranormal investigator (b. 1926)
- April 20
  - Reggie Cobb, football player (b. 1968)
  - David V. Picker, film executive and producer (b. 1931)
  - Jayne Wrightsman, philanthropist and fine arts collector (b. 1919)
- April 21
  - Steve Golin, film producer (b. 1954)
  - David A. Hamburg, psychiatrist (b. 1925)
  - Ken Kercheval, actor (b. 1935)
  - Joyce Steele, baseball player (b. 1935)
- April 22
  - Patricia Battin, librarian (b. 1929)
  - Robert L. Butler, lawyer and politician (b. 1926)
  - Deborah Cook, operatic soprano (b. 1938)
  - Jim Dunbar, radio program director (b. 1929)
  - John L'Heureux, author (b. 1934)
  - William Levy, writer (b. 1939)
  - Andy O'Donnell, basketball player (b. 1924)
  - Dave Samuels, percussionist (b. 1948)
  - Greg Theakston, comics artist (Mad) (b. 1953)
- April 23
  - Henry W. Bloch, businessman and philanthropist (b. 1922)
  - Edward Brooks, politician (b. 1942)
  - Denton Lotz, Baptist minister (b. 1938)
  - Mark Medoff, playwright (b. 1939)
  - Johnny Neumann, basketball player (b. 1950)
  - Nils John Nilsson, computer scientist (b. 1932)
  - Pablo Ramirez, skateboarder (b. 1992)
  - John Shorter Stevens, politician (b. 1933)
  - Charity Sunshine Tillemann-Dick, 35, soprano and presenter (b. 1983)
  - David Winters, English-American actor, dancer, choreographer, producer, director and screenwriter (b. 1939)
- April 24
  - Chris Albertson, journalist, writer, and record producer (b. 1931)
  - Benson K. Buffham, intelligence official (b. 1919)
  - Johnny Green, football player (b. 1937)
  - Martin Kilson, political scientist (b. 1930)
  - Dennis Stanford, archaeologist (b. 1942)
- April 25
  - John Havlicek, basketball player (b. 1940)
  - Larry "Flash" Jenkins, actor (b. 1955)
  - Manuel Lujan Jr., politician (b. 1928)
- April 26
  - Jimmy Banks, soccer player (b. 1964)
  - Jessie Lawrence Ferguson, actor (b. 1942)
  - Anthony J. Hilder, surf music producer, radio host and conspiracy film maker (b. 1935)
  - Frederick Niels Larsen, religious leader (b. 1932)
  - Ken Rothman, politician (b. 1935)
  - Mae Schmidle, politician (b. 1927)
- April 27
  - Bart Chilton, civil servant (b. 1960)
  - Teva Harrison, Canadian-American writer and cartoonist (b. 1976)
  - Ruth Macrides, historian (b. 1949)
  - Joe T. Wood, politician (b. 1922)
- April 28
  - Damon Keith, judge (b. 1922)
  - Richard Lugar, politician (b. 1932)
  - John Singleton, film director, screenwriter and producer (b. 1968)
- April 29
  - Doug Adair, television news anchor (b. 1929)
  - Eldon Bargewell, army general (b. 1947)
  - Franklin M. Fisher, economist (b. 1934)
  - Donald Lan, politician (b. 1930)
  - George Litto, film producer and talent agent (b. 1930)
  - Gino Marchetti, football player (b. 1925)
  - Ellen Tauscher, politician (b. 1951)
  - James D. Wright, sociologist (b. 1947)
- April 30
  - Peter Mayhew, English-American actor (b. 1944)
  - Robert R. Spitzer, agricultural researcher and educator (b. 1922)
  - Joseph D. Stewart, military officer (b. 1942)

== May ==
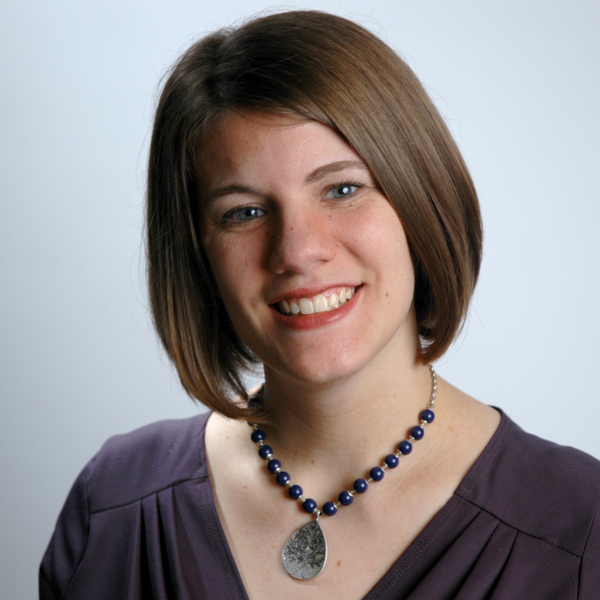
Rachel Held Evans

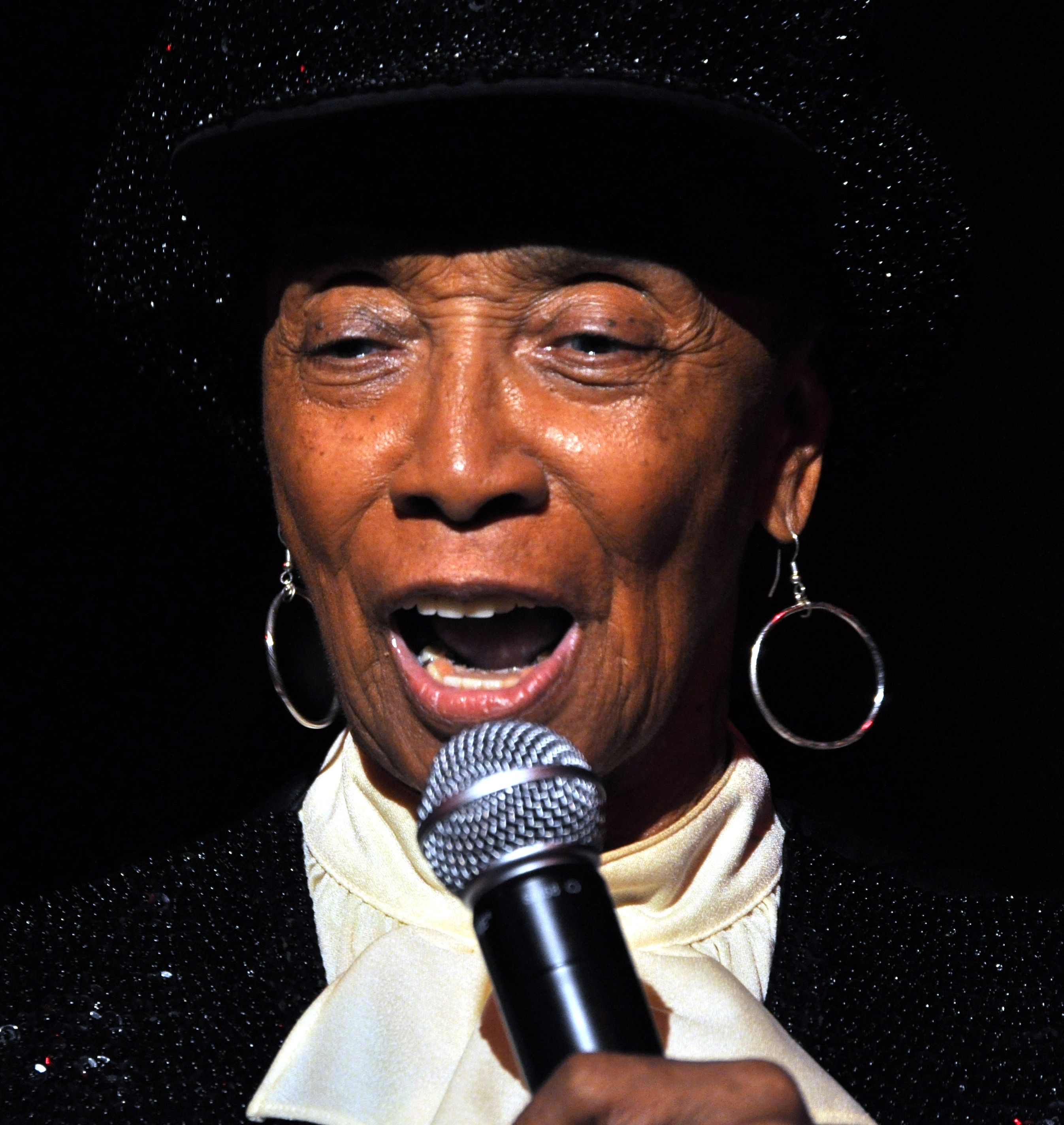
Norma Miller

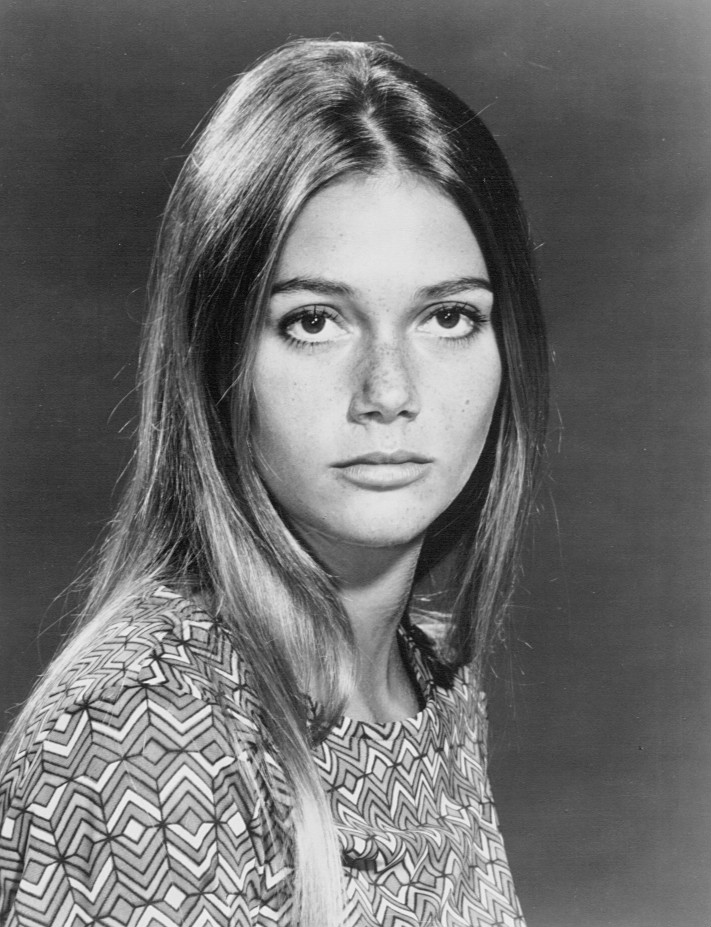
Peggy Lipton

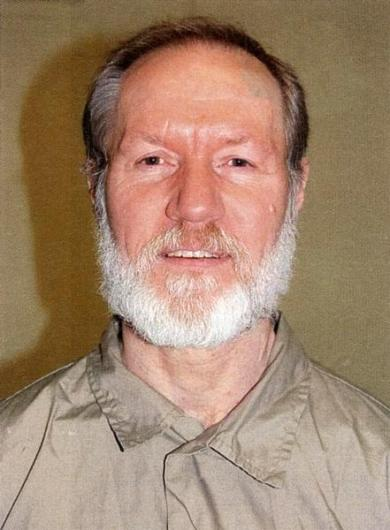
Thomas Silverstein

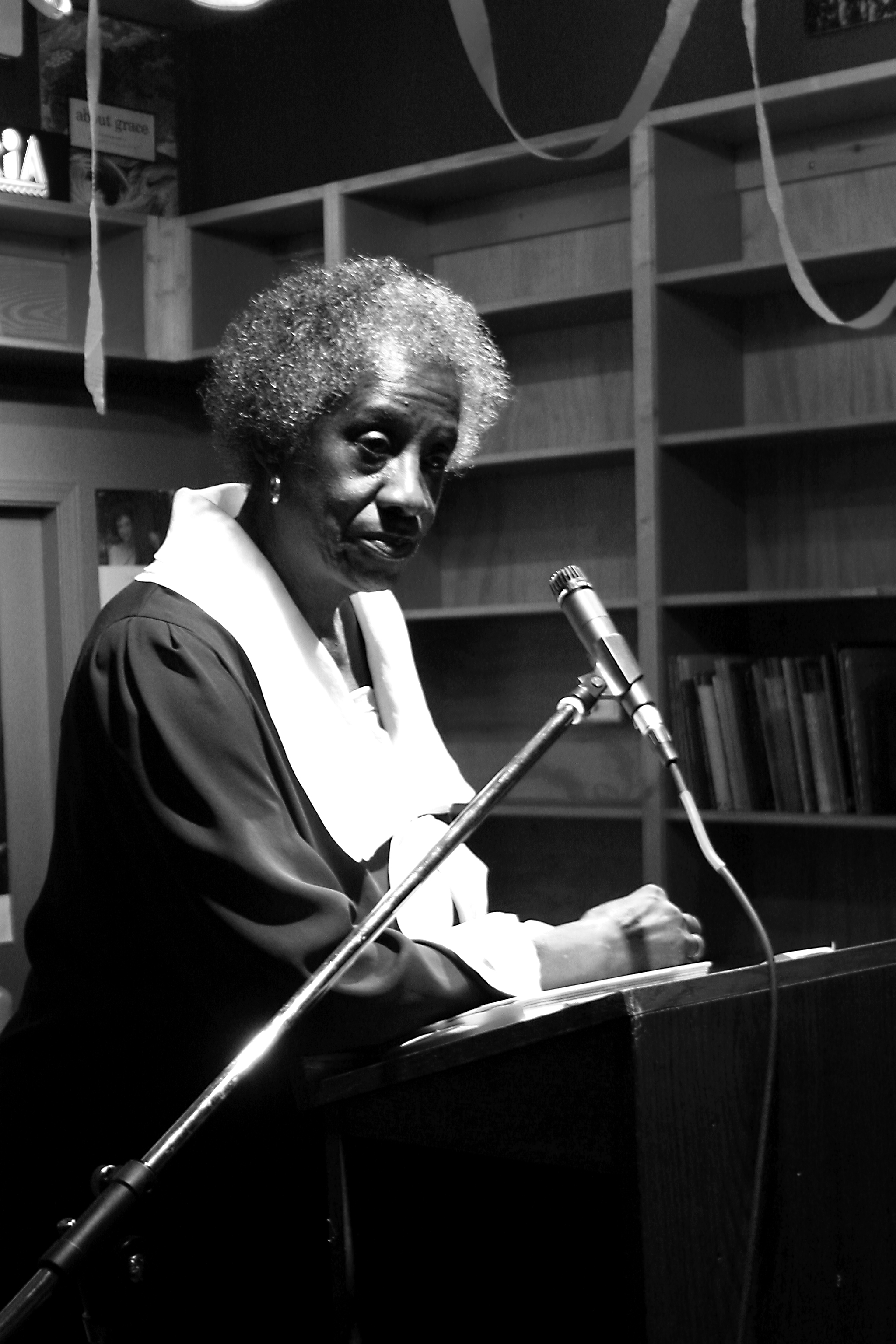
Unita Blackwell

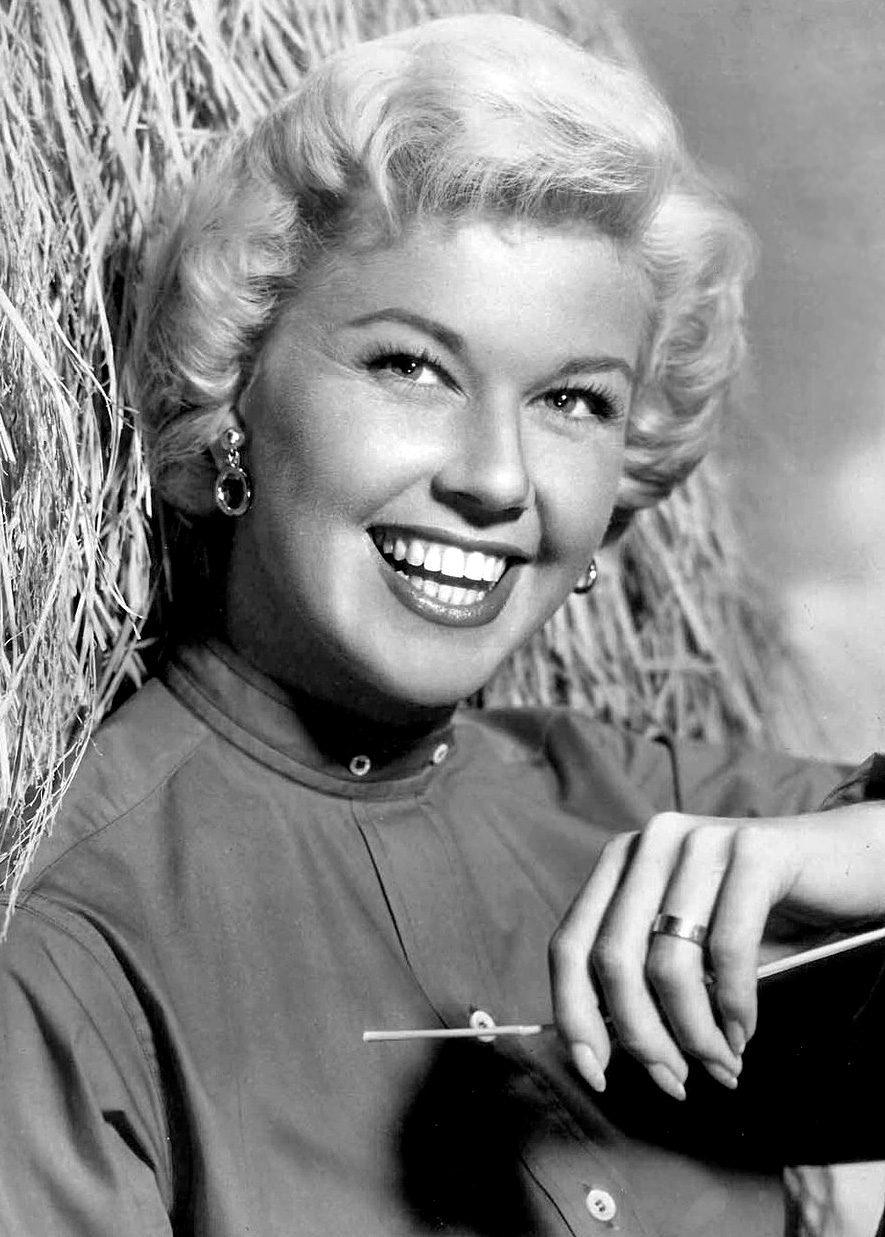
Doris Day

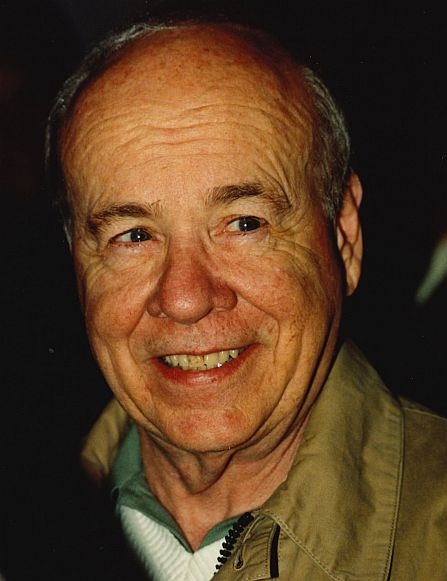
Tim Conway

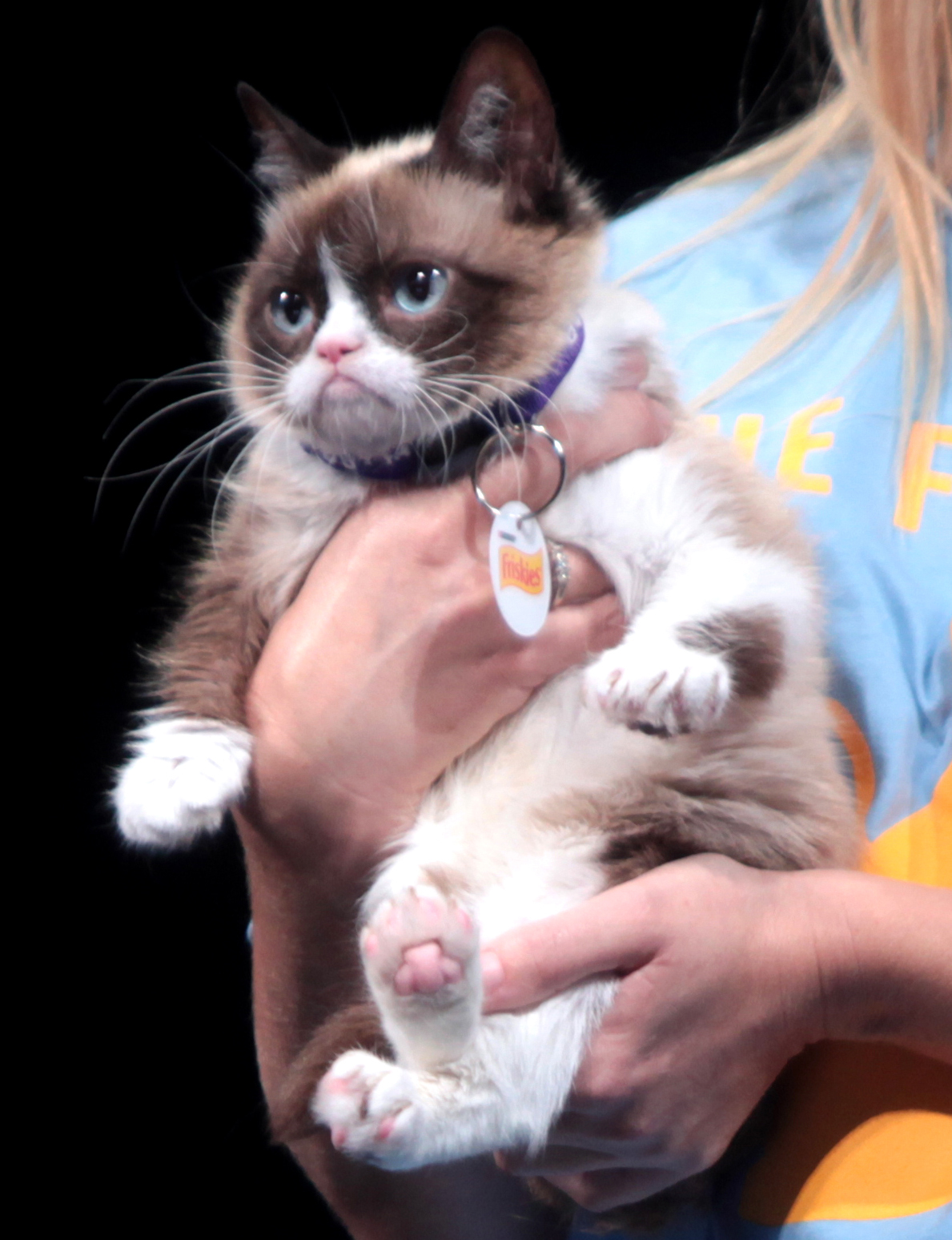
Grumpy Cat

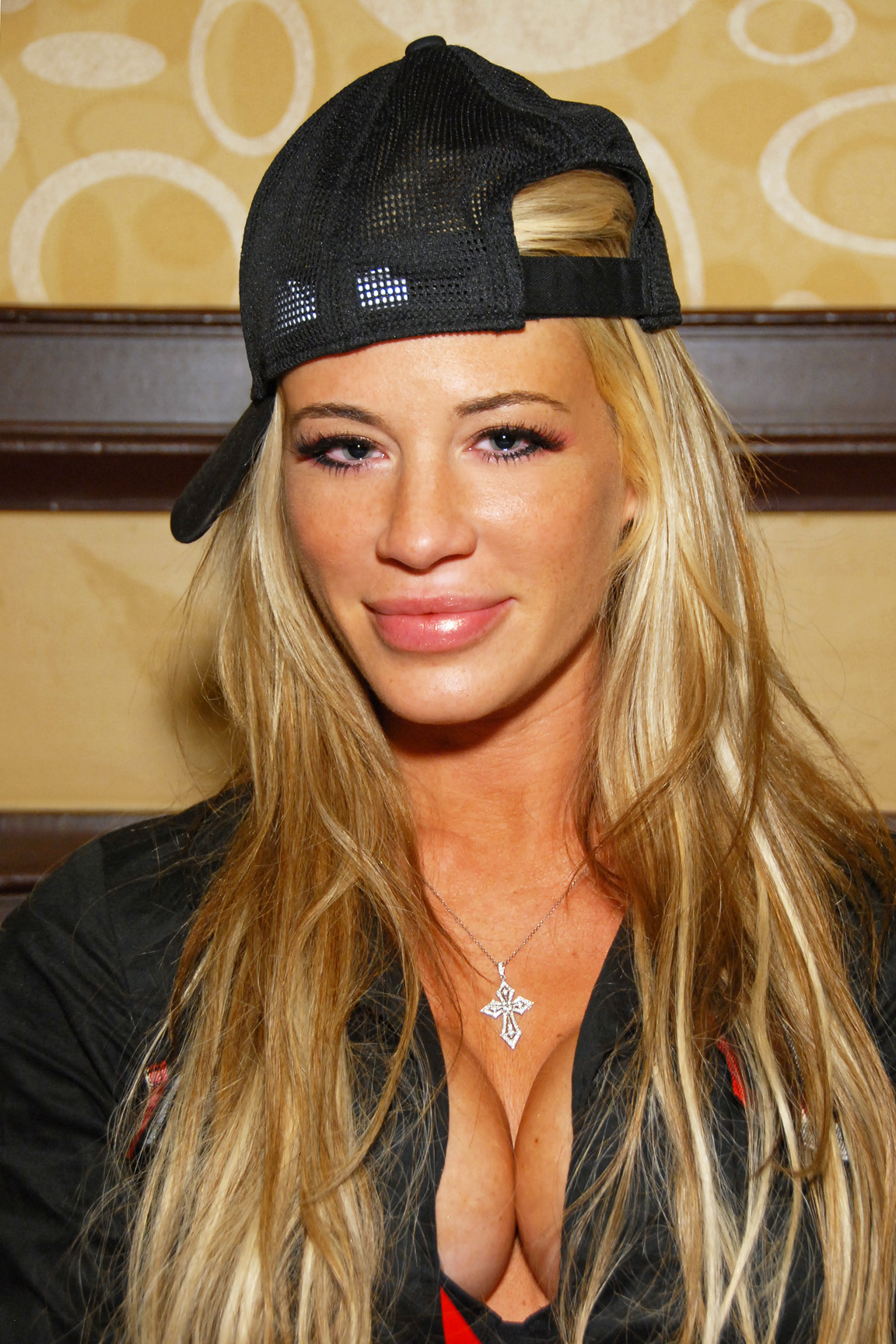
Ashley Massaro

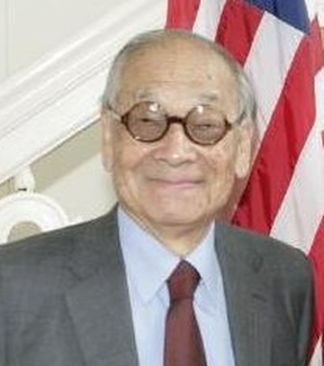
I. M. Pei

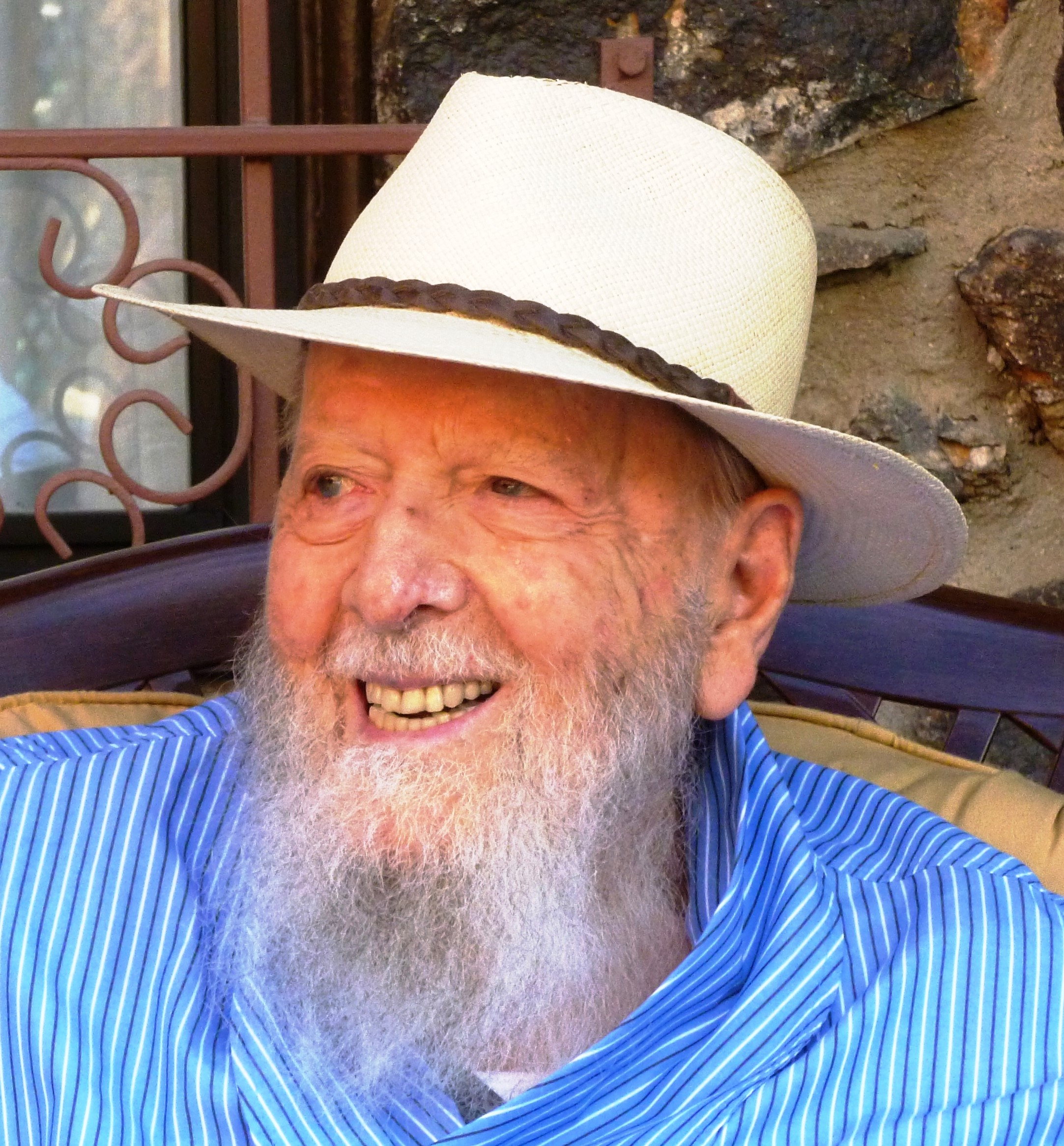
Herman Wouk

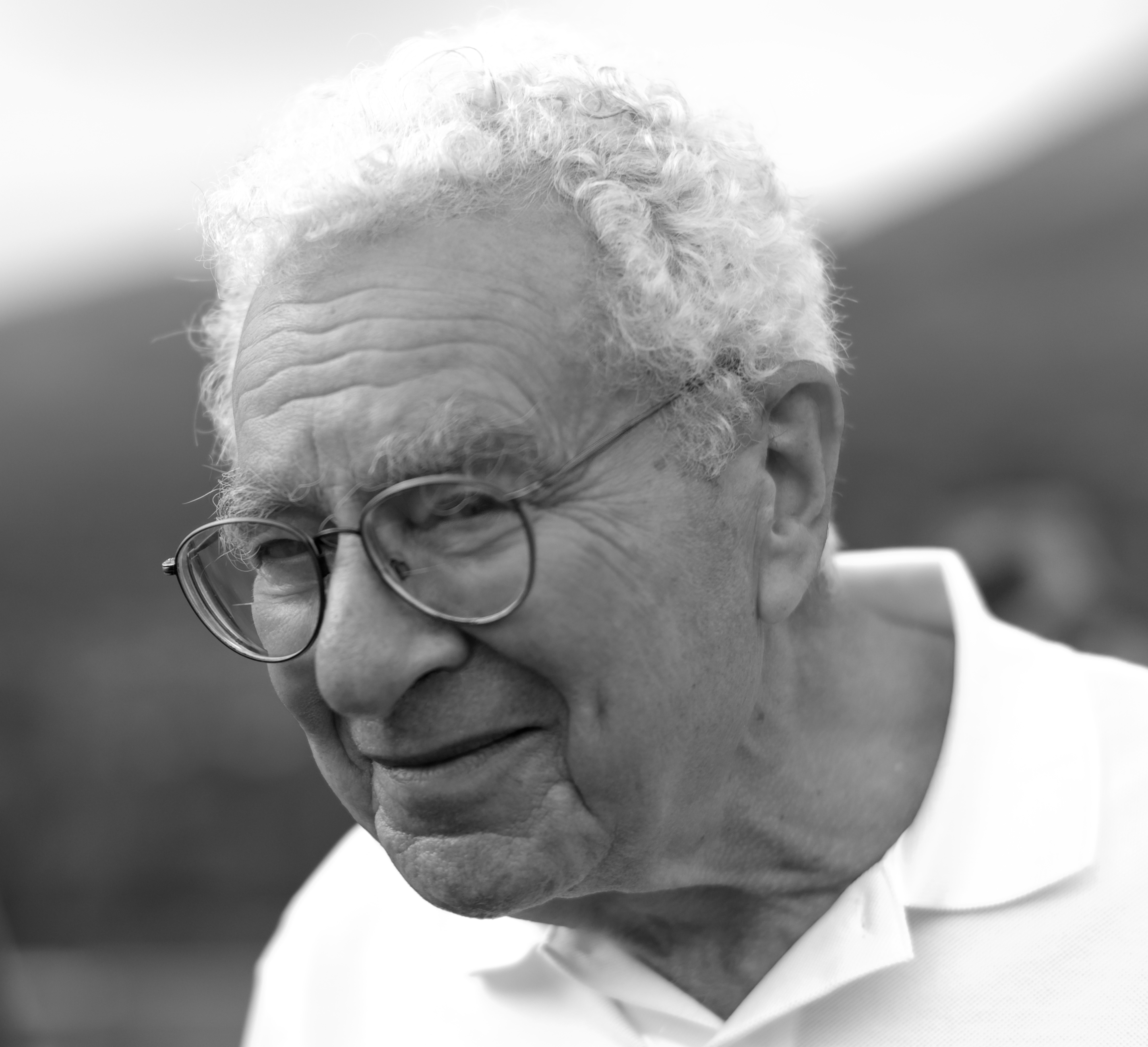
Murray Gell-Mann

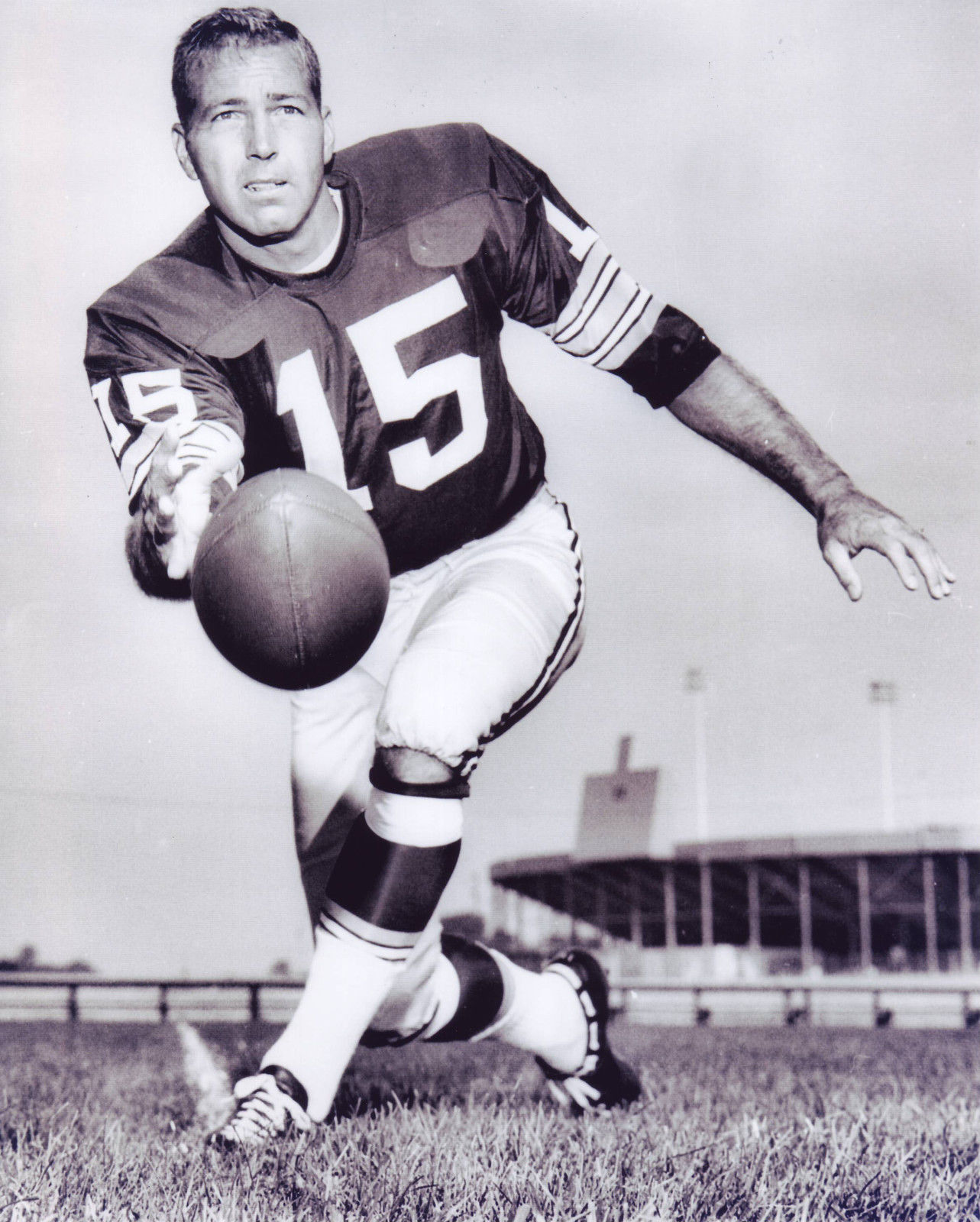
Bart Starr

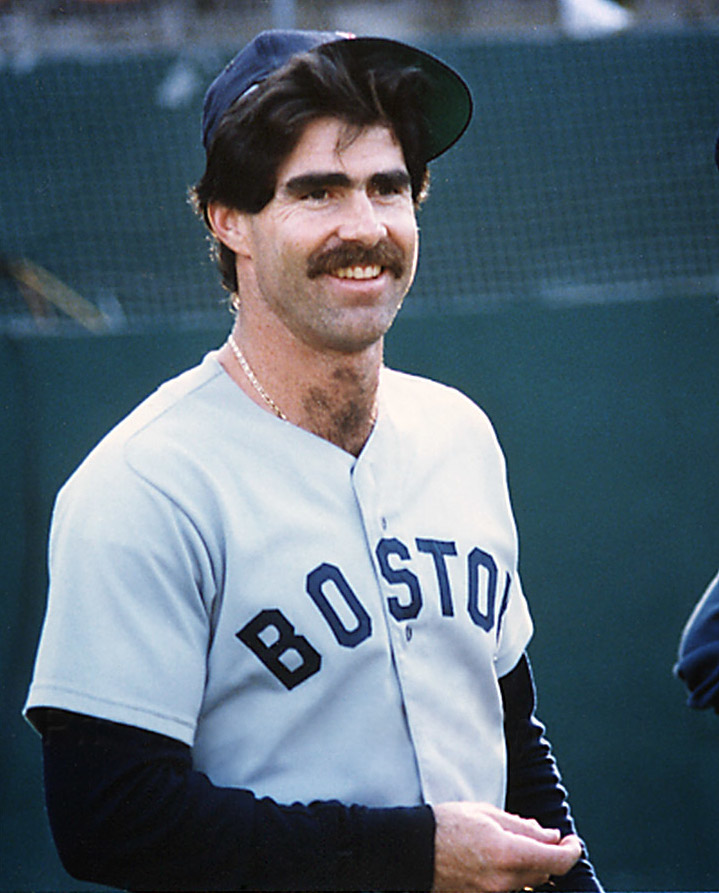
Bill Buckner

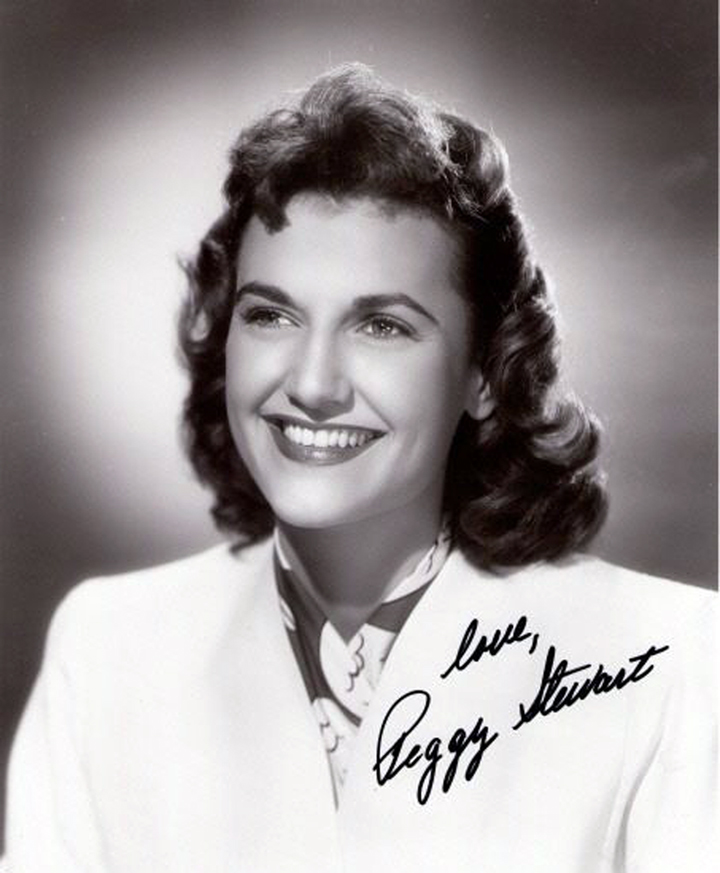
Peggy Stewart

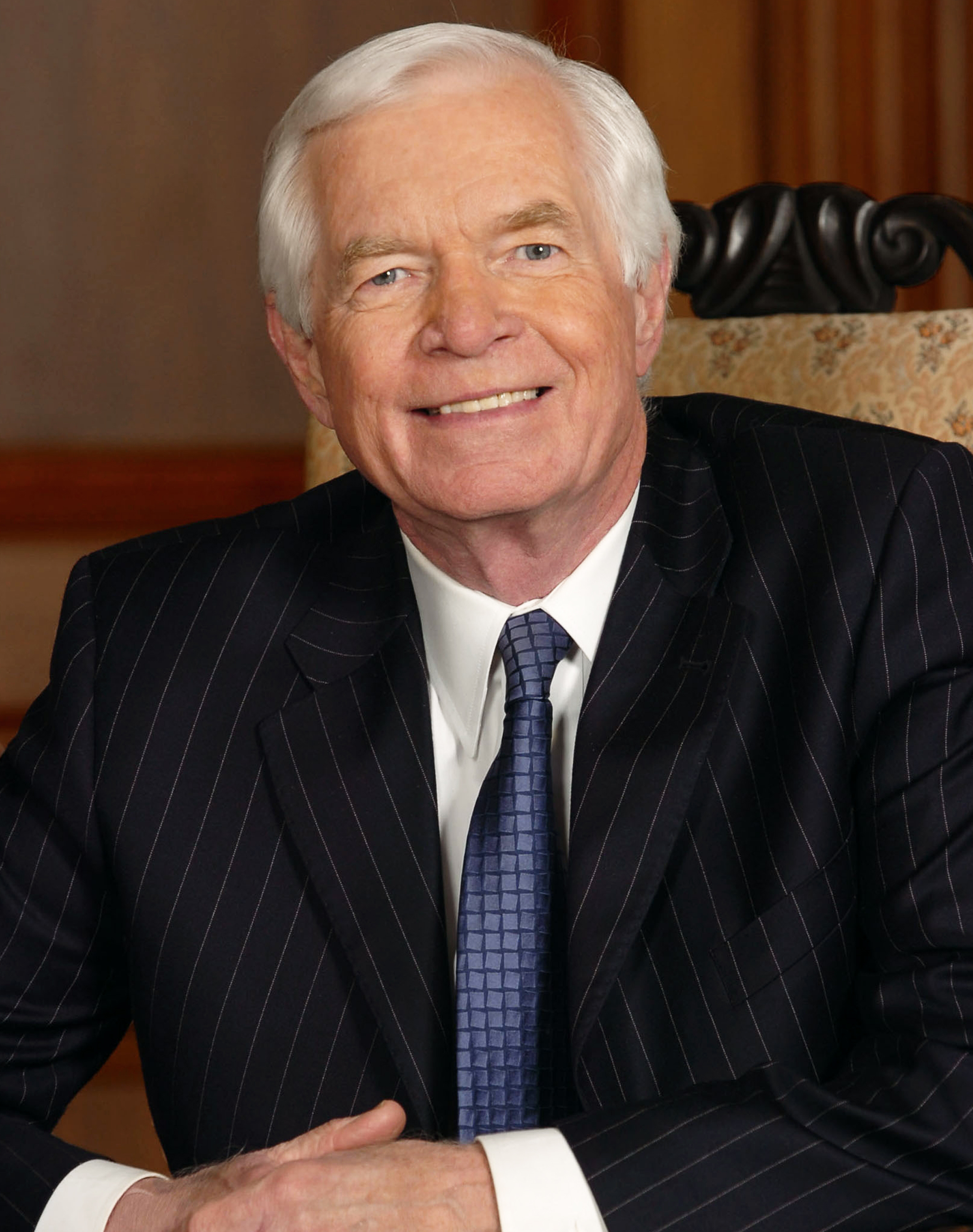
Thad Cochran

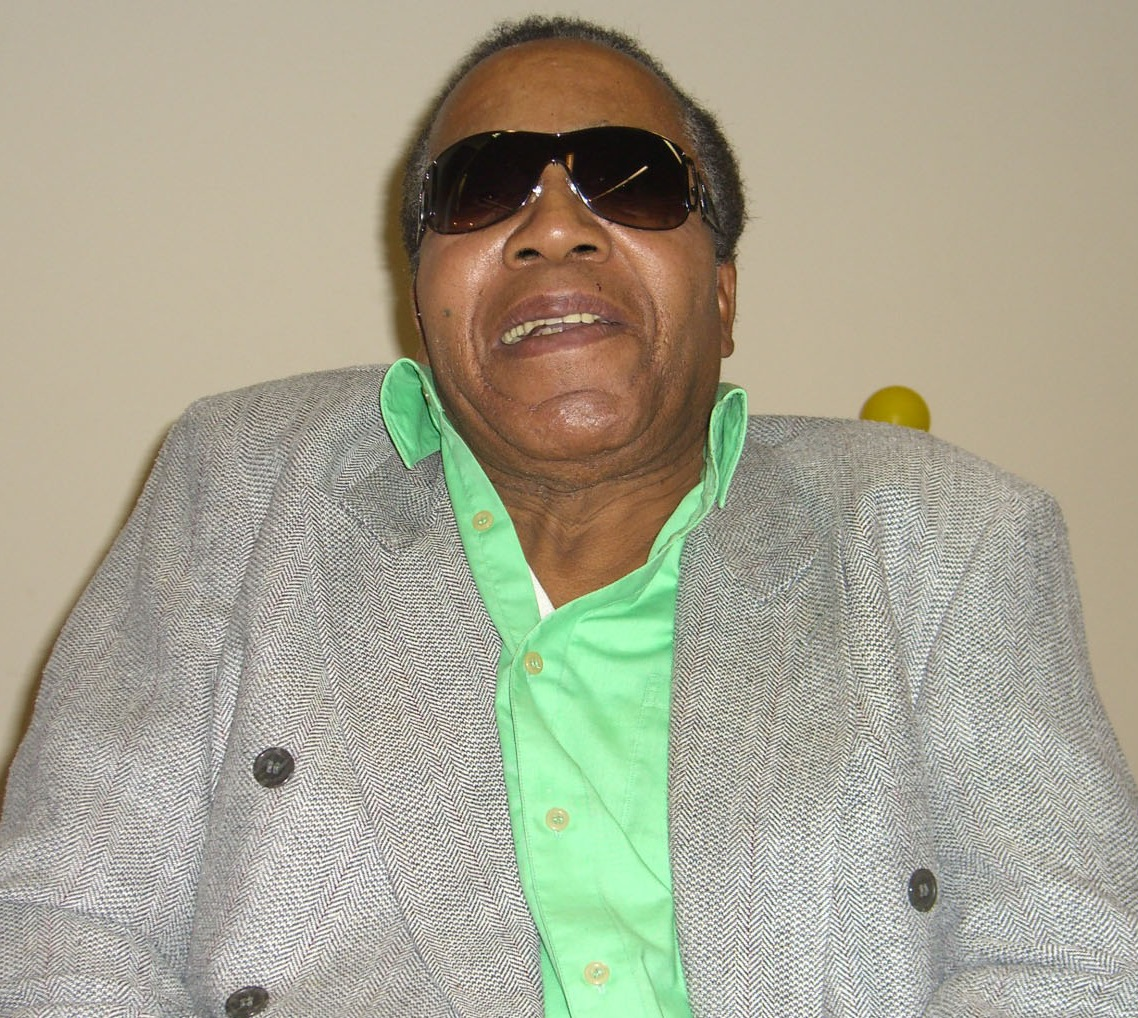
Frank Lucas

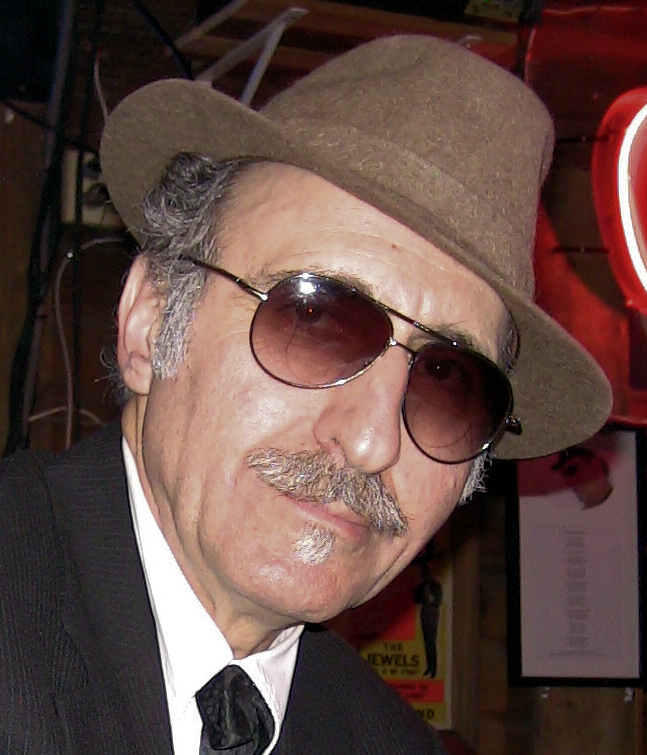
Leon Redbone

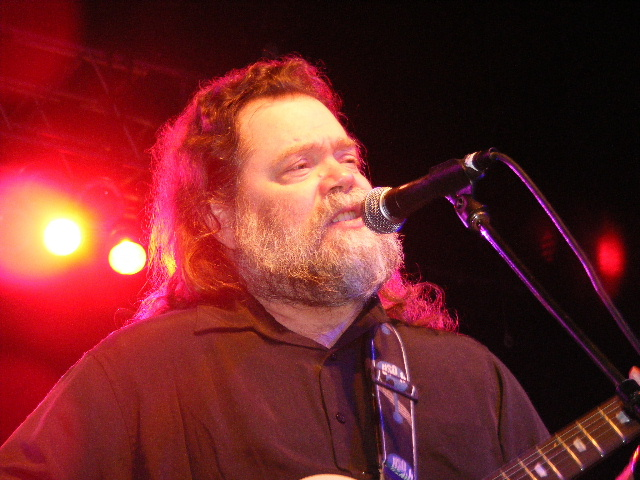
Roky Erickson

- May 1
  - Mary Doakes, educator (b. 1936)
  - Kurt Lang, German-born social scientist (b. 1924)
- May 2
  - Susan Beschta, punk rock musician, lawyer, and judge (b. 1952)
  - Larry Dick, football player (b. 1955)
  - Frank Ivancie, businessman and politician (b. 1924)
  - Chris Reccardi, animator, storyboard artist, cartoon director and musician (b. 1964)
  - Gloria Schiff, fashion editor and model (b. 1928)
  - John Starling, bluegrass musician (b. 1940)
  - Warren W. Wiersbe, biblical scholar and pastor (b. 1929)
- May 3
  - Richard Brown, lawyer (b. 1932)
  - Bill Gompers, football player (b. 1928)
  - Andy Jick, sports announcer (b. 1952)
  - Chuck Kinder, novelist (b. 1942)
  - Bob Zeman, football player and coach (b. 1937)
- May 4
  - J. R. Cobb, musician (b. 1944)
  - Rachel Held Evans, Christian columnist, blogger and author (b. 1981)
  - Thomas Hynes, politician and lawyer (b. 1938)
  - Jumpin Jackie Jackson, basketball player (b. 1940)
  - MacArthur Lane, football player (b. 1942)
  - Ray Peters, baseball player (b. 1946)
  - Ruth Anna Putnam, philosopher (b. 1927)
  - Tyrone Thompson, politician (b. 1967)
- May 5
  - Frank Brilando, racing cyclist (b. 1925)
  - Lewis A. Fidler, politician (b. 1956)
  - Norma Miller, dancer, actress and author (b. 1919)
  - Barbara Perry, actress and singer (b. 1921)
- May 6
  - Dan Cordtz, business correspondent (b. 1926)
  - John Lukacs, Hungarian-American historian (b. 1924)
  - Jimmy Satterfield, football coach (b. 1939)
  - George O. Zimmerman, Polish-American physicist (b. 1934)
- May 7
  - Kendrick Castillo, student who intervened during the 2019 STEM School Highlands Ranch shooting (b. 2000 or 2001)
  - Larry Hanley, union leader (b. 1956)
  - Robert Pear, journalist (b. 1949)
  - Roberta L. Raymond, actress and open housing activist (b. 1938)
- May 8
  - Jim Fowler, zoologist and television host (b. 1930)
  - Luther Jennings, singer (Jackson Southernaires) (b. 1932)
  - Robert McEliece, mathematician and engineering professor (b. 1942)
  - David Montgomery, baseball executive (b. 1946)
  - Wendell Nedderman, academic administrator (b. 1921)
- May 9
  - Daniel H. Bays, historian (b. 1941)
  - Martin Canin, pianist (b. 1930)
  - Preston Epps, musician (b. 1930)
  - Clement von Franckenstein, actor (b. 1944)
  - Allene Roberts, actress (b. 1928)
  - Mark Rubinstein, financial engineer (b. 1944)
  - Alvin Sargent, screenwriter (b. 1927)
- May 10
  - Fleming Begaye Sr., World War II Navajo code talker (b. 1921)
  - Bert Cooper, boxer (b. 1965)
  - Wiley Young Daniel, senior judge (b. 1946)
  - Warren H. Phillips, journalist and publisher (b. 1926)
  - Dick Tomey, football coach (b. 1938)
  - James Tuck, archaeologist (b. 1939)
- May 11
  - Peggy Lipton, actress and model (b. 1946)
  - Robert D. Maxwell, combat soldier, recipient of the Medal of Honor (b. 1920)
  - Thomas Silverstein, convicted murderer, Aryan Nations leader (b. 1952)
  - Sol Yaged, jazz clarinetist (b. 1922)
- May 12
  - Elsa Patton, reality television personality (b. 1934)
  - Gene Romero, motorcycle racer (b. 1947)
  - Bill K. Williams, politician (b. 1943)
  - Bill Workman, politician (b. 1940)
- May 13
  - Unita Blackwell, civil rights activist (b. 1933)
  - Jerome Callet, music teacher and instrument designer (b. 1929)
  - Doris Day, actress and singer (b. 1922)
  - Stanton T. Friedman, American-Canadian nuclear physicist and ufologist (b. 1934)
- May 14
  - Lutz Bacher, artist (b. 1943)
  - Tim Conway, actor and comedian (b. 1933)
  - Grumpy Cat, internet celebrity cat (b. 2012)
  - Robert Bruce Propst, senior judge (b. 1931)
  - Leon Rausch, singer (b. 1927)
  - Alice Rivlin, politician (b. 1931)
  - Michael Rossmann, German-American physicist and microbiologist (b. 1930)
  - Mike Wilhelm, musician (b. 1941)
- May 15
  - Rob Babcock, basketball executive (b. 1953)
  - Chuck Barksdale, singer (The Dells) (b. 1935)
  - Bobby Diamond, actor and attorney (b. 1943)
  - Georgie Anne Geyer, syndicated newspaper columnist (b. 1935)
  - George L. Kelling, criminologist and professor (b. 1935)
  - Charles Kittel, physicist (b. 1916)
  - Frank F. Ledford Jr., military doctor, Surgeon General of the United States Army (1988–1992) (b. 1934)
  - Rod Tam, politician (b. 1953)
- May 16
  - Steve Duemig, golfer and sports media personality (b. 1954)
  - Ashley Massaro, professional wrestler, television personality, and model (b. 1979)
  - I. M. Pei, Chinese-American architect (b. 1917)
  - Bob Schloredt, football player and coach (b. 1939)
- May 17
  - John Warlick McDonald, diplomat (b. 1921)
  - Eric Moore, musician (b. 1951)
  - Herman Wouk, author (b. 1915)
- May 18
  - Melvin Edmonds, R&B singer (After 7) (b. 1953)
  - Austin Eubanks, motivational speaker, survivor of the Columbine High School massacre (b. 1982)
  - John Payne, football coach (b. 1932)
  - Justin Ponsor, comic book artist (b. 1977)
  - Guenther Roth, sociologist (b. 1930)
  - Sammy Shore, comedian and actor (b. 1927)
- May 19
  - William W. Caldwell, judge (b. 1925)
  - George Chaump, football player and coach (b. 1935)
  - Bert J. Harris Jr., politician (b. 1919)
  - Ronnie Young, politician (b. 1947)
- May 20
  - Sandy D'Alemberte, lawyer and administrator (b. 1933)
  - Charles C. Pattillo, Air Force lieutenant general (b. 1924)
  - Ronnie Virgets, writer and reporter (b. 1942)
- May 21
  - James O. Bass, politician (b. 1910)
  - Lawrence Carroll, Australian-American painter (b. 1954)
  - Fred Fox, musician (b. 1914)
  - Ernest Graves Jr., Army lieutenant general (b. 1924)
  - Donald West VanArtsdalen, judge (b. 1919)
  - John A. Yngve, lawyer and politician (b. 1924)
- May 22
  - Theresa Burroughs, civil rights activist (b. 1929)
  - Tony Gennari, Italian-American basketball player ([b. 1942)
  - Kwame Kenyatta, politician (b. 1955)
- May 23
  - Shirley Brannock Jones, judge (b. 1925)
  - Bobby Joe Long, serial killer (b. 1953)
  - Bill Yoast, high school football coach (T. C. Williams High School), depicted in Remember the Titans (b. 1924)
- May 24
  - Curtis Blake, businessman and philanthropist (b. 1917)
  - Murray Gell-Mann, Nobel physicist (b. 1929)
  - Edmund Morris, presidential biographer (b. 1940)
  - John Pinto, politician (b. 1924)
- May 25
  - Rod Bramblett, sportscaster (b. 1965)
  - Joseph Anthony Galante, Roman Catholic prelate (b. 1938)
  - Anthony Graziano, consigliere (Bonanno crime family) (b. 1940)
  - LaSalle D. Leffall Jr., surgeon and oncologist (b. 1929)
- May 26
  - Leann Birch, developmental psychologist (b. 1946)
  - Everett Kinstler, artist (b. 1926)
  - Richard P. Matsch, judge (b. 1930)
  - Bart Starr, football player and coach (b. 1934)
- May 27
  - Robert L. Bernstein, publisher and activist (b. 1923)
  - Bill Buckner, baseball player (b. 1949)
  - Roger O. Hirson, dramatist and screenwriter (b. 1926)
  - Tony Horwitz, journalist and author (b. 1958)
- May 28
  - Horace Belton, football player (b. 1955)
  - Carmine Caridi, actor (b. 1934)
  - Dennis Etchison, author and editor (b. 1943)
  - Willie Ford, soul singer (The Dramatics) (b. 1950)
  - John Gary Williams, R&B singer (The Mad Lads) (b. 1945)
- May 29
  - Errett Callahan, archaeologist (b. 1937)
  - Tony DeLap, artist (b. 1927)
  - Tony Glover, blues harmonicist (b. 1939)
  - Roy Jeffs, sexual abuse victim (b. 1992)
  - Peggy Stewart, actress (b. 1923)
  - Jackie Winters, politician (b. 1937)
- May 30
  - Patricia Bath, ophthalmologist and inventor (b. 1942)
  - Thad Cochran, politician (b. 1937)
  - Frank Lucas, drug trafficker (b. 1930)
  - Leon Redbone, Cypriot-American singer-songwriter, guitarist and actor (b. 1949)
- May 31
  - David M. Ainsworth, politician (b. 1955)
  - Roky Erickson, rock singer-songwriter and musician (b. 1947)
  - Jimmy Martin, politician (b. 1938)
  - Le Anne Schreiber, sports editor (b. 1945)

== June ==
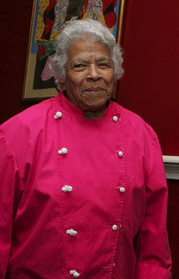
Leah Chase

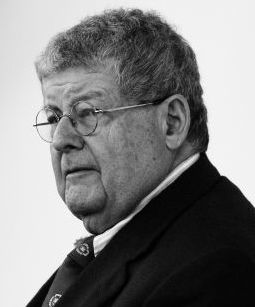
Stanley Tigerman

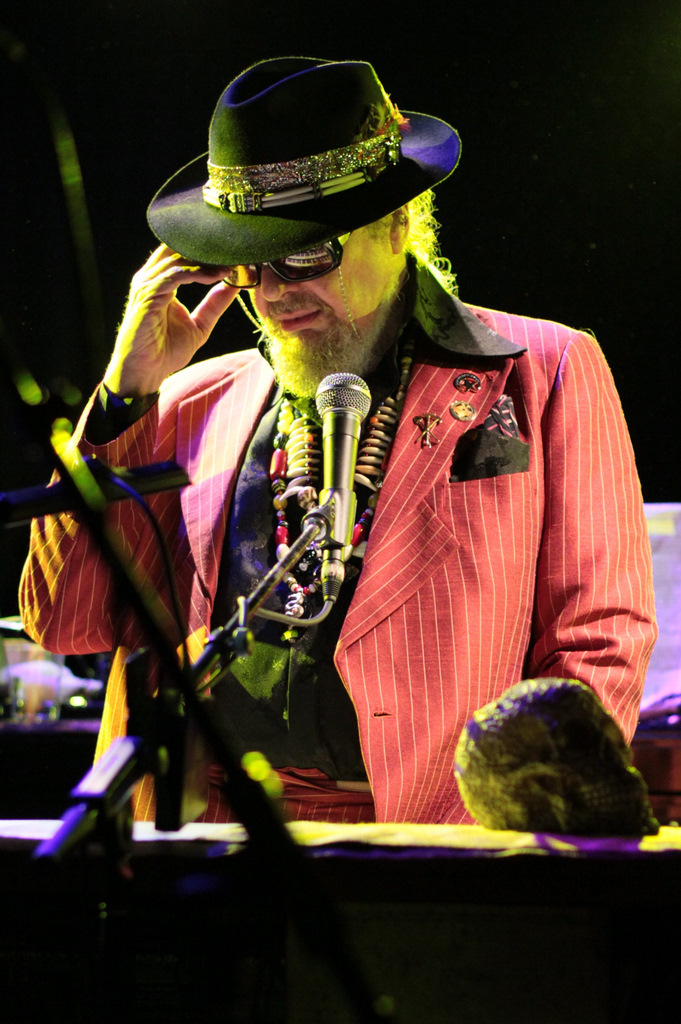
Dr. John

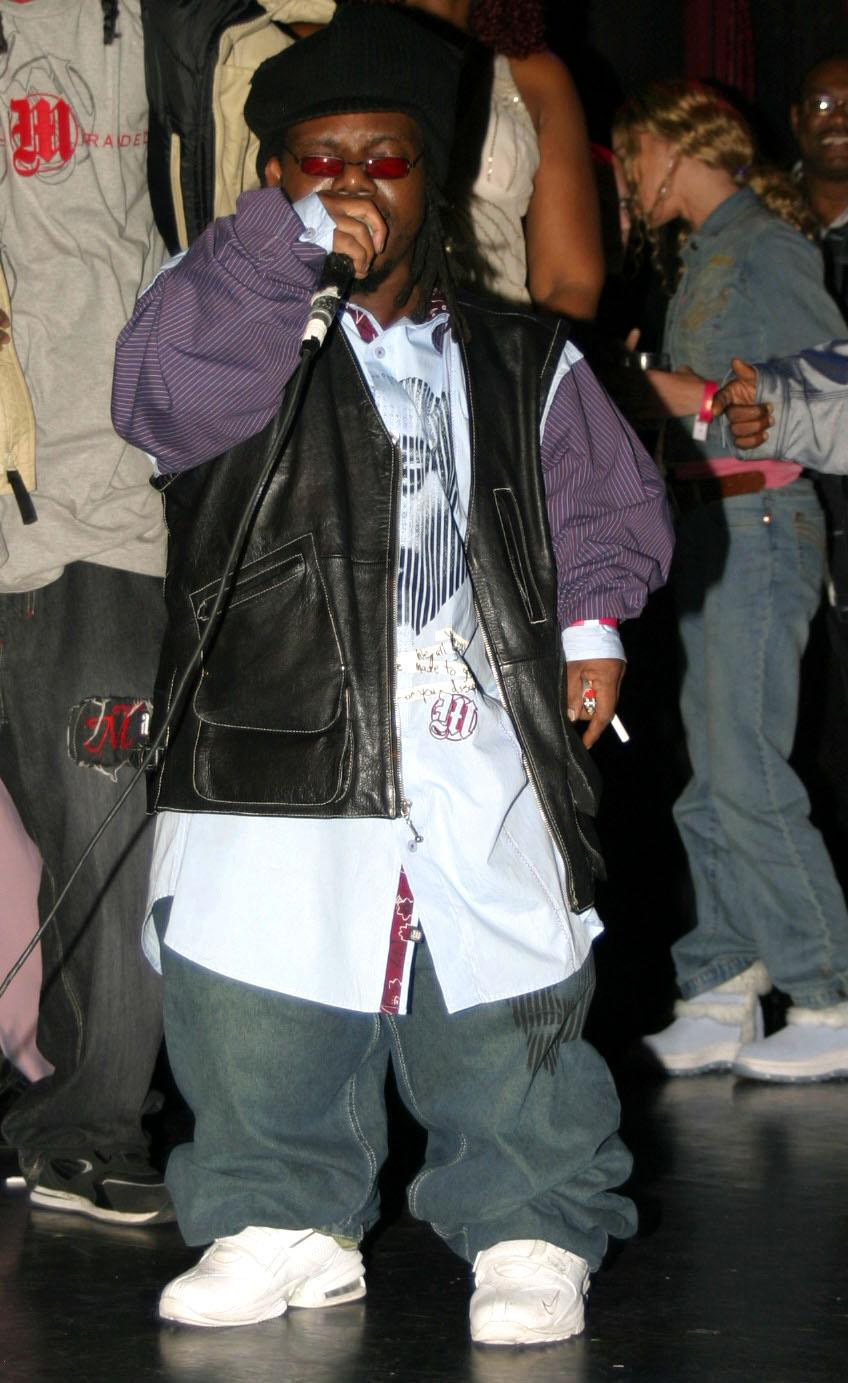
Bushwick Bill

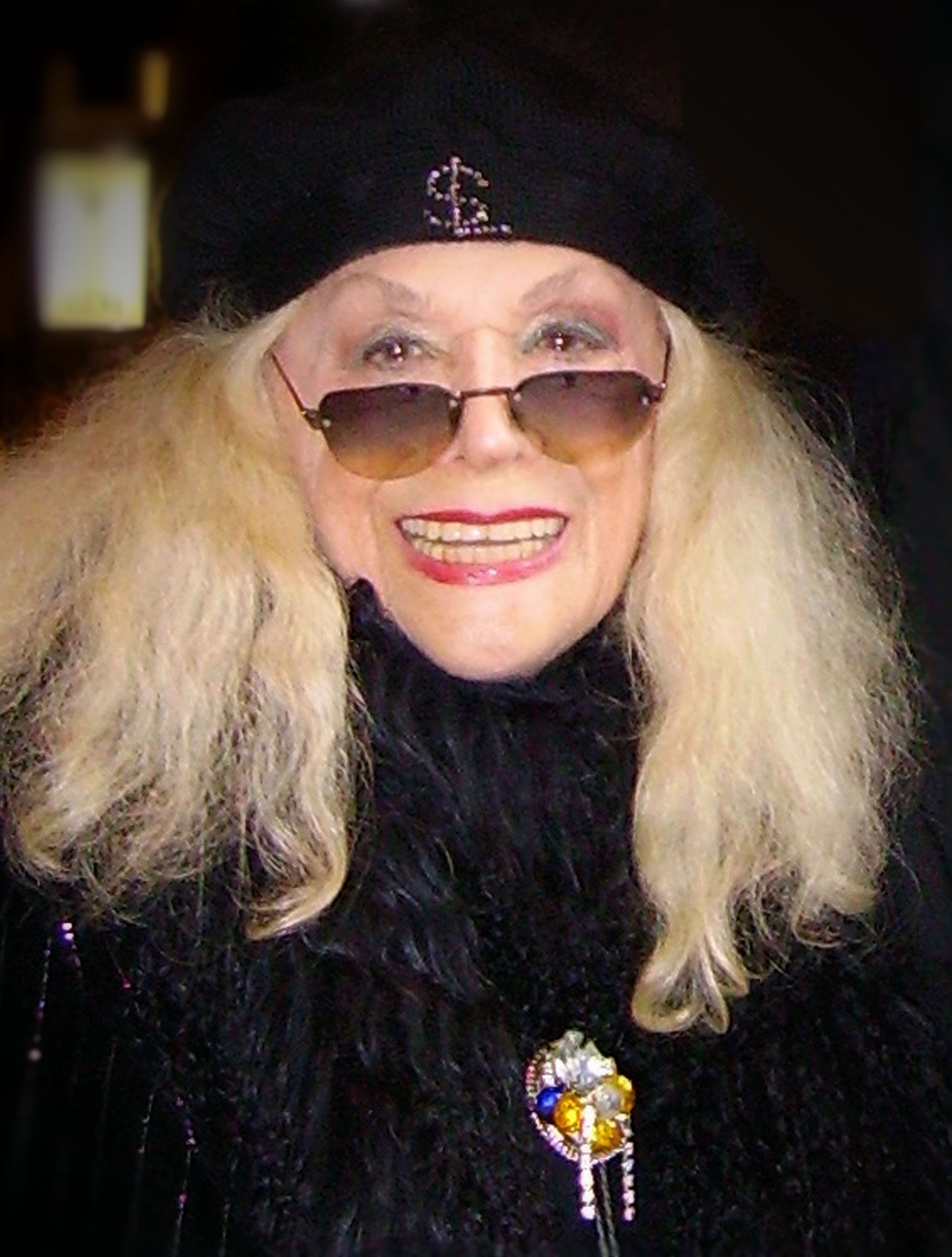
Sylvia Miles

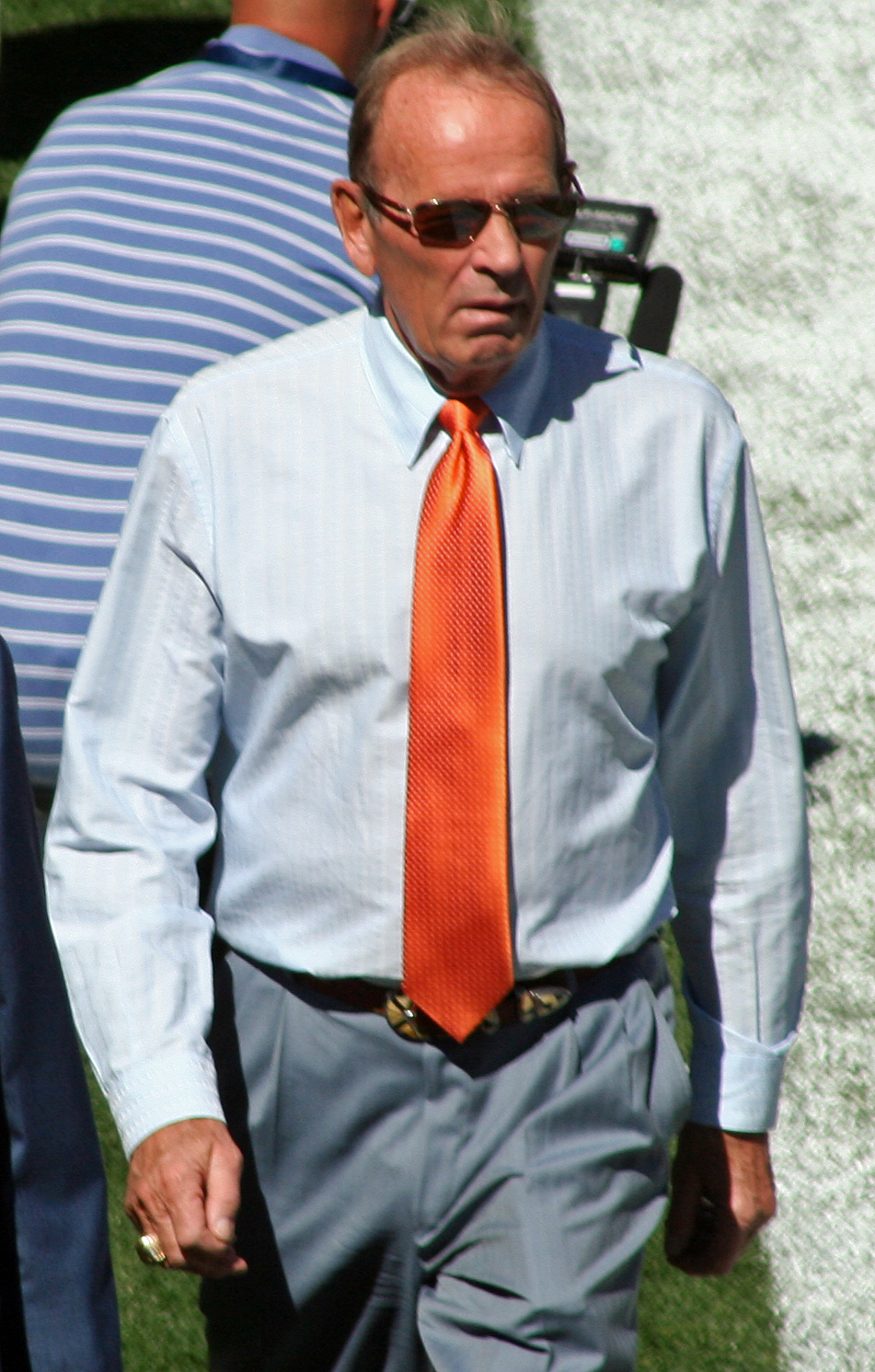
Pat Bowlen

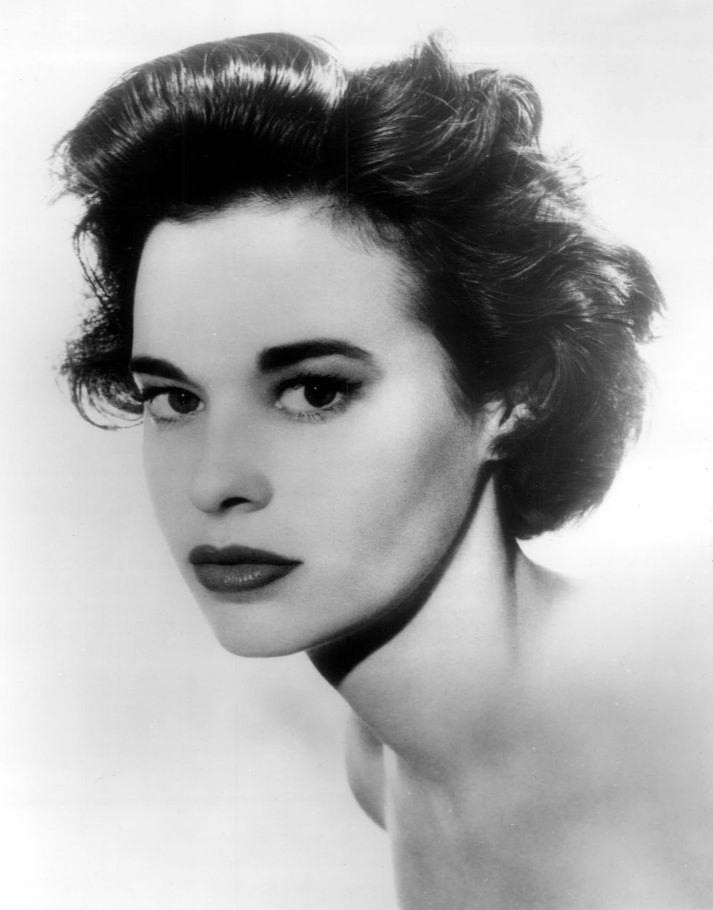
Gloria Vanderbilt

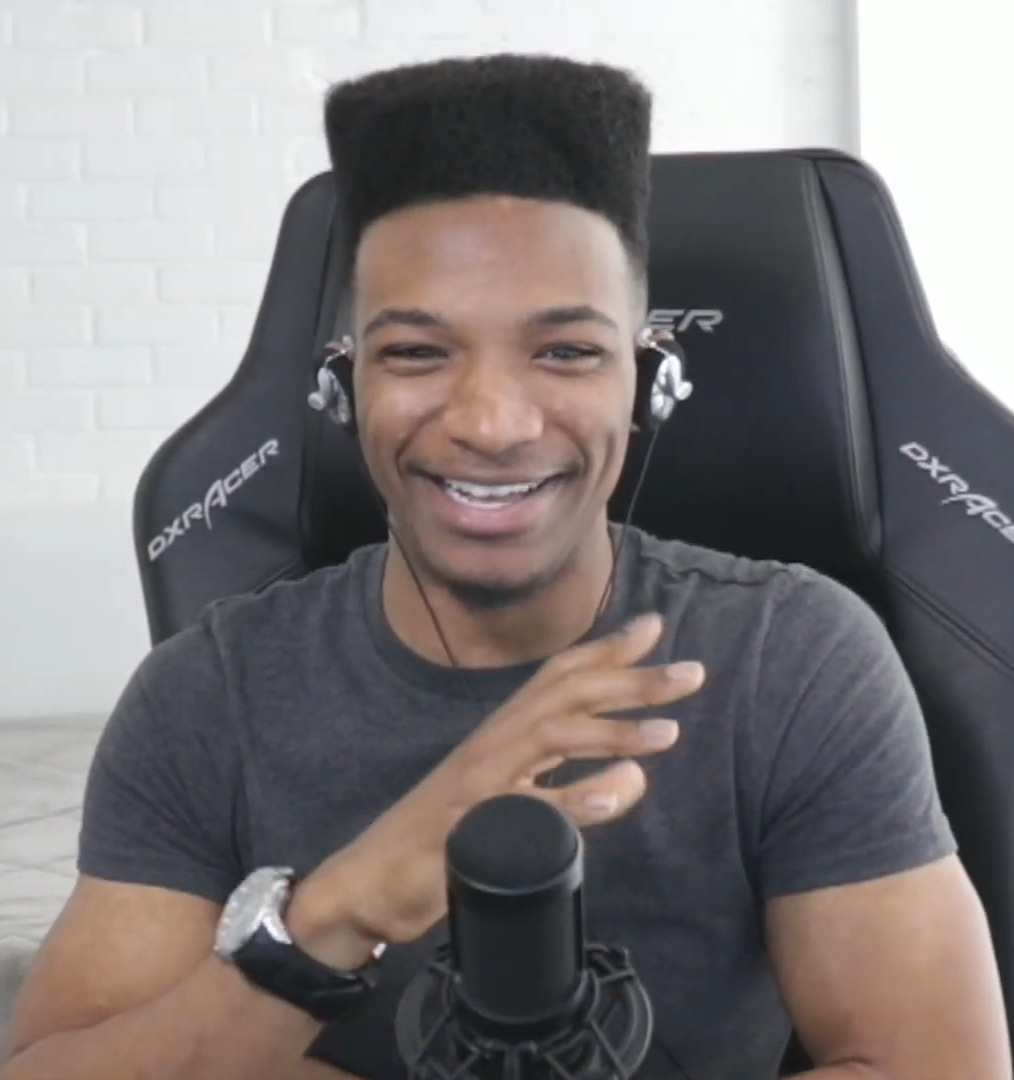
Etika

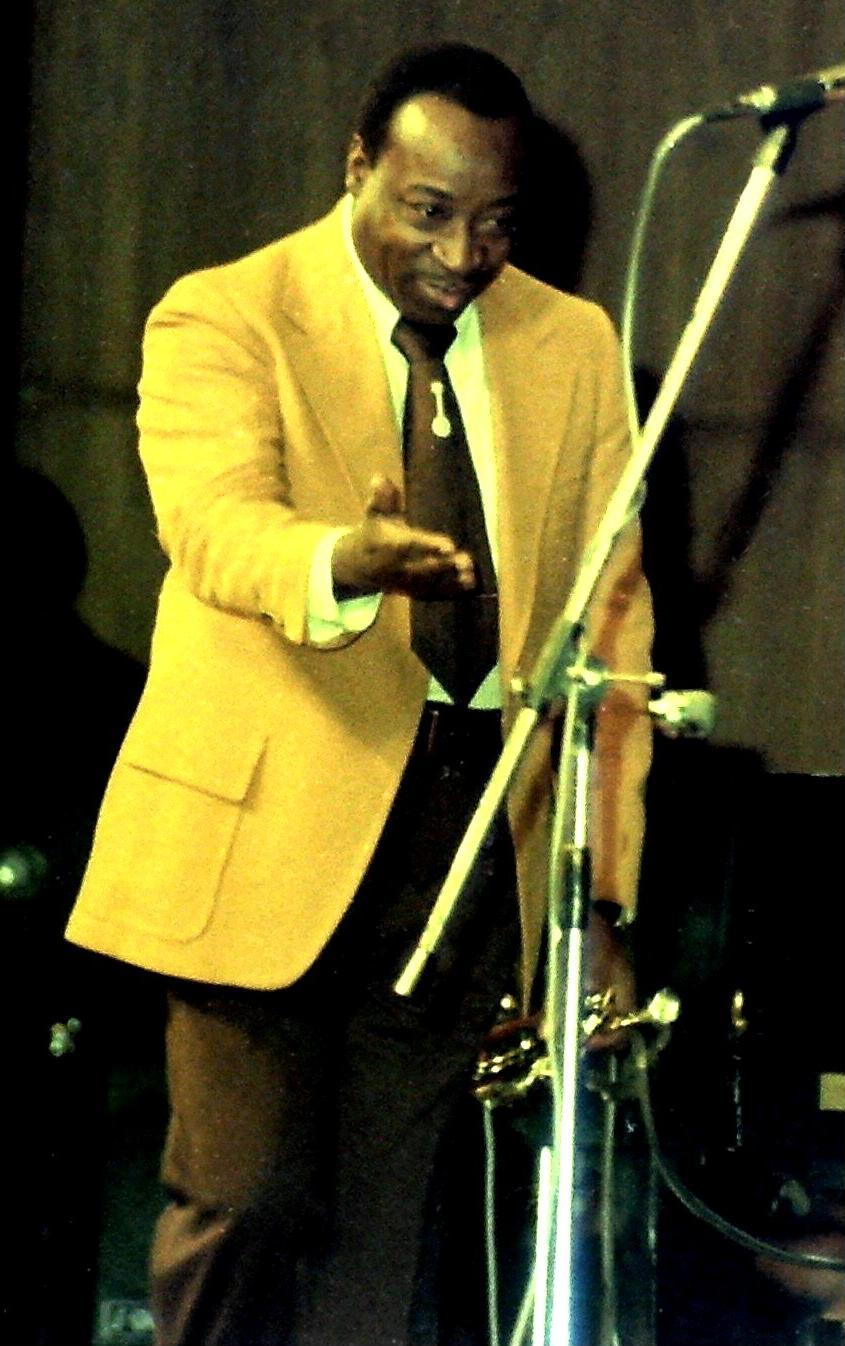
Dave Bartholomew

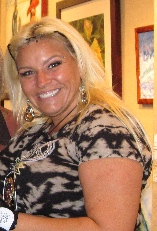
Beth Chapman

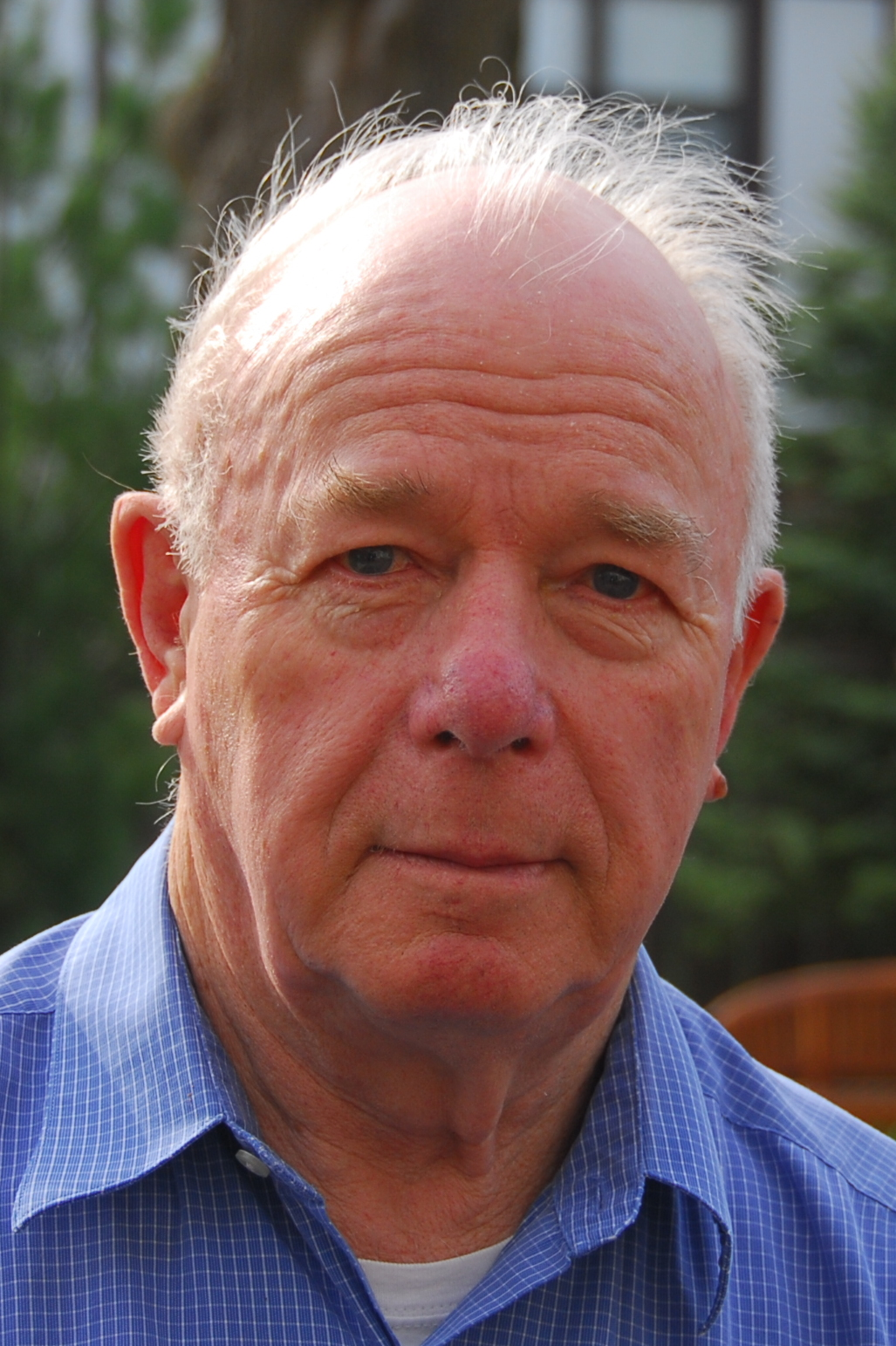
David Binder

- June 1
  - Camille Billops, sculptor, filmmaker, and printmaker (b. 1933)
  - Leah Chase, chef and restaurateur (b. 1923)
- June 2
  - Donald M. Fraser, politician (b. 1924)
  - Jacob W. Gruber, anthropologist, archaeologist, historian and educator (b. 1921)
  - Henry T. Lynch, physician and cancer researcher (b. 1928)
  - Lowell North, sailor and sailmaker (b. 1929)
  - Don Pederson, politician (b. 1928)
- June 3
  - Ellen Bree Burns, judge (b. 1923
  - Stanley Tigerman, architect (b. 1930)
- June 4
  - Keith Birdsong, illustrator (b. 1959)
  - Linda Collins-Smith, politician (b. 1962)
  - Billy Gabor, basketball player (b. 1922)
  - Joe Overstreet, painter and activist (b. 1933)
  - Herbert Sandler, billionaire banker and philanthropist (b. 1931)
- June 5
  - Robert Earle, game show host (b. 1926)
  - Jonathan Nichols, politician (b. 1965)
- June 6
  - John Gunther Dean, diplomat (b. 1926)
  - Maida Heatter, pastry chef (b. 1916)
  - Dr. John, singer-songwriter and musician (b. 1941)
- June 7
  - Noémi Ban, Hungarian-born public speaker and Holocaust survivor (b. 1922)
  - Tony Rodham, businessman, brother of Hillary Clinton (b. 1954)
- June 8
  - Spencer Bohren, singer-songwriter and guitarist (b. 1950)
  - Adelaide M. Cromwell, sociologist (b. 1919)
  - Arthur Frackenpohl, classical composer (b. 1924)
  - Eric Patterson, football player (b. 1993)
- June 9
  - Bushwick Bill, Jamaican-American rapper (b. 1966)
  - William D. Wittliff, screenwriter and photographer (b. 1940)
- June 10
  - Elizabeth Barrett-Connor, epidemiologist (b. 1935)
  - Chuck Glaser, country singer (Tompall & the Glaser Brothers) (b. 1936)
  - Paul Sinegal, zydeco and blues guitarist and singer (b. 1944)
  - Sherman Utsman, racing driver (NASCAR) (b. 1932)
- June 11
  - Martin Feldstein, economist (b. 1939)
  - Gabriele Grunewald, middle-distance runner (b. 1986)
  - Velvel Pasternak, Canadian-born Jewish musicologist (b. 1933)
- June 12
  - Gary Burrell, businessman and philanthropist (b. 1937)
  - Wilbert J. McKeachie, psychologist (b. 1921)
  - Sylvia Miles, actress (b. 1924)
  - Bob Mitchell, baseball player (b. 1932)
  - Ray Rigby, politician (b. 1923)
- June 13
  - Pat Bowlen, football team owner (b. 1944)
  - Edwin Michael Kosik, federal judge (b. 1924)
  - Joyce Pensato, painter (b. 1941)
- June 15
  - David Esterly, woodcarver and writer (b. 1944)
  - Larry Foss, baseball player (b. 1936)
  - Susannah Hunnewell, editor and publisher (b. 1966)
  - Charles A. Reich, academic and writer (b. 1928)
- June 16
  - Alan Brinkley, political historian (b. 1949)
  - Bishop Bullwinkle, pastor (b. 1948)
  - Charles Ginnever, sculptor (b. 1931)
  - Suzan Pitt, painter, animator, and film director (b. 1943)
  - Francine Shapiro, psychologist (b. 1948)
- June 17
  - Andrew Anderson, basketball player (b. 1945)
  - Darwin Hindman, politician (b. 1933)
  - Robert Therrien, sculptor (b. 1947)
  - Gloria Vanderbilt, artist, fashion designer (b. 1924)
- June 18
  - Stephen Blaire, Roman Catholic prelate (b. 1941)
  - Donald E. Hines, politician (b. 1933)
  - Milton Quon, animator (b. 1913)
  - Patrick Smith, kickboxer and mixed martial artist (b. 1963)
  - Gerry Spiess, single-handed sailor (b. 1940)
- June 19
  - Etika, model and YouTuber (b. 1990)
  - Philip Geier, advertising executive (b. 1935)
  - Jack Renner, audio engineer and record label executive (b. 1935)
- June 21
  - Susan Bernard, actress and author (b. 1948)
  - Jan Meyers, politician (b. 1928)
  - Elliot Roberts, music manager and record executive (b. 1943)
  - Peter Selz, German-born art historian (b. 1919)
- June 22
  - Jerry Carrigan, drummer and record producer (b. 1943)
  - Judith Krantz, romance novelist (b. 1928)
  - Robert V. Levine, social psychologist (b. 1945)
- June 23
  - Dave Bartholomew, musician, bandleader and songwriter (b. 1918)
  - Spiro Malas, opera and theatre singer and actor (b. 1933)
  - Jack Rudolph, football player (b. 1938)
- June 24
  - Jeff Austin, bluegrass mandolinist and singer (b. 1974)
  - Billy Drago, actor (b. 1946)
  - Al Ogletree, baseball coach (b. 1930)
- June 25
  - Tony Barone, basketball coach (b. 1946)
  - Ken Behring, real estate developer and football team owner (b. 1928)
- June 26
  - Fletcher Benton, sculptor (b. 1931)
  - Beth Chapman, bounty hunter and reality television personality (b. 1967)
  - Manuel Real, judge (b. 1923)
  - Peter Westergaard, classical composer (b. 1931)
  - Max Wright, actor (b. 1943)
- June 27
  - Ben Barenholtz, film producer and distributor (b. 1935)
  - John Czawlytko, professional wrestler (b. 1963)
  - Don Frerichs, politician (b. 1931)
  - Justin Raimondo, journalist and libertarian theorist (b. 1951)
- June 28
  - Paul Benjamin, actor (b. 1938)
  - Judith Poxson Fawkes, tapestry weaver (b. 1941)
- June 29
  - Gary Duncan, rock guitarist and singer (b. 1946)
  - Stewart Greene, advertising executive (b. 1928)
  - Jim Reed, racing driver (b. 1926)
  - Whitney North Seymour Jr., politician and attorney (b. 1923)
- June 30
  - David Binder, British-born journalist and writer (b. 1931)
  - Mitchell Feigenbaum, physicist (b. 1944)
