= Deaths in April 2019 =

The following is a list of notable deaths in April 2019.

Entries for each day are listed alphabetically by surname. A typical entry lists information in the following sequence:

- Name, age, country of citizenship at birth, subsequent country of citizenship (if applicable), reason for notability, cause of death (if known), and reference.

== April 2019 ==
=== 1 ===
- Dixie Allen, 84, American politician, member of the Ohio House of Representatives (1998–2006).
- Enrique Álvarez Conde, 67, Spanish academic (King Juan Carlos University), lung cancer.
- Giacomo Battaglia, 54, Italian comedian, complications from a stroke.
- Thomas N. Burnette, 74, American lieutenant general.
- Bill Butchart, 85, Australian Olympic middle-distance runner.
- Sardar Fateh Buzdar, 79–80, Pakistani politician, member of the Provincial Assembly of the Punjab (1985–1988, 2002–2013).
- Caravelli, 88, French conductor and composer (And Satan Calls the Turns).
- Dimitar Dobrev, 87, Bulgarian wrestler, Olympic champion (1960).
- Michael William Feast, 92, British-born South African astronomer.
- Gustav Hanson, 84, American Olympic biathlete.
- Sinethemba Jantjie, 30, South African footballer (Free State Stars), traffic collision.
- Joan Jones, 79, American-born Canadian civil rights activist.
- Francisco Massiani, 74, Venezuelan writer and painter.
- Bucky McConnell, 90, American basketball player (Milwaukee Hawks).
- Vonda N. McIntyre, 70, American science fiction author (Dreamsnake, The Crystal Star), pancreatic cancer.
- Frank E. Moore, 85, American politician, member of the Pennsylvania House of Representatives (1969–1970).
- Vladimir Orloff, 90, Romanian-Canadian cellist and music teacher.
- Yisroel Avrohom Portugal, 95, American rabbi, Rebbe of Skulen (since 1982).
- Ruth-Margret Pütz, 89, German coloratura soprano.
- Rafael Sánchez Ferlosio, 91, Spanish writer, Cervantes Prize winner (2004).
- Dilip Sarkar, 61, Indian politician, liver and kidney disease.
- Ron Sweed, 70, American television host, heart attack.
- Joseph Ubalde, 34, Filipino weatherman (AksyonTV), news producer (GMA News) and columnist (The Manila Times).
- Vodka, 14, Japanese racehorse, laminitis.
- S. Pierre Yameogo, 63, Burkinabé film director and screenwriter (Delwende).

=== 2 ===
- Matoug Adam, 93, Libyan politician, Minister of Tourism (1968–1969) and Interior (1969).
- Rovshan Almuradly, 64, Azerbaijani actor, director and screenwriter, heart attack.
- Lorraine Branham, 66, American newspaper editor and academic administrator, uterine cancer.
- Herman Braun-Vega, 85, Peruvian painter.
- Rick Elias, 64, American musician (A Ragamuffin Band), brain cancer.
- Kim English, 48, American house and gospel singer-songwriter, kidney failure.
- Michael Fahy, 68, Irish politician, Galway County Councilor (since 1979).
- Martin Fido, 79, British crime writer, fall.
- Benjamin D. Hall, 87, American geneticist.
- Ken Hay, 85, American religious leader, founder of The Wilds Christian Association.
- Bill Heine, 74, British radio broadcaster (BBC Radio Oxford), leukaemia.
- Jón Helgason, 87, Icelandic politician, MP (1974–1995), Minister of Justice (1983–1987) and Agriculture (1987–1988).
- Harry Judge, 90, English educational theorist.
- Mahendran, 79, Indian film director (Mullum Malarum, Nenjathai Killathe, Kamaraj) and actor.
- Jamshid Mashayekhi, 84, Iranian actor (Brick and Mirror, The Fateful Day, Abadan).
- John Oddo, 66, American jazz pianist and music arranger.
- Choidoryn Övgönkhüü, 76, Mongolian Olympic judoka (1972).
- Roger Paris, French slalom canoeist.
- Margarita Prentice, 88, American politician.
- Liliane Sprécher, 92, French Olympic athlete (1948).
- Rosemarie Springer, 98, German Olympic equestrian (1960).
- Donald L. Totten, 86, American politician.
- Sergio Valdés, 85, Chilean footballer (Universidad Católica, national team), leukaemia.
- Franz Weber, 91, Swiss environmentalist.
- Don Williamson, 85, American businessman (Brainerd International Raceway) and politician, mayor of Flint, Michigan (2003–2009), complications of respiratory illness.
- Giuseppe Zorzi, 81, Italian racing cyclist.

=== 3 ===
- Ferdinando Bologna, 93, Italian art critic.
- Mary Borgstrom, 102, Canadian potter and ceramist.
- Meyer Brownstone, 96, Canadian anti-poverty activist (Oxfam Canada).
- Aleksey Buldakov, 68, Russian actor (The Guard, Peculiarities of the National Hunt, Hitler Goes Kaput!), blood clot.
- Philip Furia, 75, American author.
- Alina Kabata-Pendias, 89, Polish chemist and academic, specialist in biogeochemistry and soil science.
- Guo Kun, 83, Chinese Antarctic explorer, director of the Great Wall Station and the Chinese Arctic and Antarctic Administration.
- Daryl Hecht, 66, American judge, member of the Iowa Supreme Court (2006–2018), melanoma.
- Einar Iversen, 88, Norwegian jazz pianist and composer.
- Brian Kinwald, 45, American radio control car driver.
- Jacqueline Lichtenstein, 72, French philosopher and art historian.
- Billy Mainwaring, 78, Welsh rugby union player (Aberavon, Bridgend, national team).
- Julia Nicol, 62-63, South African LGBT rights activist and librarian.
- Gabriel Piroird, 86, French Roman Catholic prelate, Bishop of Constantine (1983–2008).
- Maurice Pon, 97, French lyricist.
- Carmelita Pope, 94, American actress (A Streetcar Named Desire).
- W. Wesley Pue, 64, Canadian lawyer.
- Shawn Smith, 53, American singer, songwriter and musician (Brad, Satchel, Pigeonhed), torn aorta and high blood pressure.
- Jerzy Wójcik, 88, Polish cinematographer.

=== 4 ===
- Cesare Cadeo, 72, Italian television presenter and journalist.
- T. T. Clayton, 88, American attorney.
- Alberto Cortez, 79, Argentine singer and songwriter, gastric haemorrhage.
- Georgiy Daneliya, 88, Russian film director and screenwriter, People's Artist of the USSR (1989), acute respiratory and heart failure.
- Đồng Sĩ Nguyên, 96, Vietnamese military officer and politician, Deputy Prime Minister (1982–1991).
- Ralph Garafola, 89, American artist and literary crtitc.
- Ray Harper, 91, New Zealand rugby union executive (Rugby Southland) and manager (national team), bone cancer.
- Roberta Haynes, 91, American actress (Return to Paradise, High Noon, Gun Fury).
- Mike Jakubo, 71, Canadian ice hockey player (Los Angeles Sharks, Fort Wayne Komets, Virginia Wings), complications from Alzheimer's disease.
- Barry Malkin, 80, American film editor (The Godfather Part II, Big, Rumble Fish).
- Thompson Mann, 76, American swimmer, Olympic champion (1964).
- Marilyn Mason, 93, American concert organist and academic (University of Michigan).
- Mildred Milliea, 89, Canadian Elsipogtog linguist.
- Ivan Mrázek, 93, Czech Olympic basketball player (1948, 1952), European champion (1946) and coach.
- Alessandro Pizzorno, 95, Italian sociologist.
- Arthur Polonsky, 93, American painter.
- Louis Rosenblum, 95, American research scientist and activist.
- Shridhar Sathe, 68, Indian-born American food scientist.
- Albin Siwak, 86, Polish politician.
- Myer Skoog, 92, American basketball player (Minneapolis Lakers).
- Chuck Walling, 89, American actor (The Bold and the Beautiful, Days of Our Lives).
- Iola Williams, 83, American politician.
- John Winneke, 81, Australian judge.

=== 5 ===
- Anandavally, 67, Indian actress (Amba Ambika Ambalika, Sree Murukan, Swarna Gopuram) and voice actress.
- Lionel R. Boucher, 88, American politician, member of the New Hampshire House of Representatives (1984–1990).
- Sydney Brenner, 92, South African biologist, Nobel Prize laureate (2002).
- Julio Cotler, 86, Peruvian anthropologist.
- Roger DeJordy, 81, Canadian ice hockey player (Hershey Bears).
- Ib Glindemann, 84, Danish jazz composer and bandleader.
- Herb Goldberg, 81, German-born American psychologist and author.
- Nikolay Kovalyov, 69, Russian politician, Director of the Federal Security Service (1996–1998).
- Nina Lagergren, 98, Swedish activist, co-founder of the Raoul Wallenberg Academy.
- Gianfranco Leoncini, 79, Italian footballer (Juventus, Atalanta, national team), leukaemia.
- Pastor López, 74, Venezuelan singer-songwriter, stroke.
- Ly Tong, 73, Vietnamese-American anti-communist activist, lung failure.
- Trevor McKee, 81, New Zealand Thoroughbred trainer (Sunline).
- Samuel Pilafian, 69, American tuba player, colon cancer.
- Alwin Plank, 88, Austrian Olympic ski jumper.
- Lasse Pöysti, 92, Finnish actor.
- John Quarmby, 89, English actor (Fawlty Towers, K-9 and Company, A Christmas Carol).
- William Lee Rayborn, 82, American politician.
- Keith Tate, 74, English boxer, stomach cancer.
- Elriesa Theunissen-Fourie, 25, South African cricketer (national team), traffic collision.
- Thomas Vietorisz, 93, Hungarian-born American economist.
- Davey Williams, 66, American avant-garde guitarist (Curlew) and music critic (Birmingham News), cancer.
- Wowaka, 31, Japanese Vocaloid producer and vocalist, heart failure.

=== 6 ===
- Pete Adams, 67, American football player (Cleveland Browns).
- Shirin Akiner, 75, Uzbek academic.
- Romus Burgin, 96, American World War II veteran and author.
- Paul J. Coleman, 87, American space scientist.
- Jack Corrin, 87, Manx jurist and politician, First Deemster (1988–1998).
- Louis Crump, 102, American politician, member of the Texas Senate (1959–1967).
- Jim Glaser, 82, American country music artist ("You're Gettin' to Me Again"), heart attack.
- Richard Green, 82, American sexologist and psychiatrist.
- Fritz Hollings, 97, American politician, member of the U.S. Senate (1966–2005), Governor of South Carolina (1959–1963).
- Lin Mingyu, 81, Chinese politician, Party Secretary of Haikou, Vice Chairman of Hainan People's Congress and CPPCC.
- Olli Mäki, 82, Finnish boxer, European amateur champion (1959), complications from Alzheimer's disease.
- Lloyd McDermott, 79, Australian rugby union player (national team), nation's first indigenous barrister.
- Jean Namotte, 84, Belgian politician, Wallonia MP (1995–2004) and handball player.
- Michael O'Donnell, 90, British physician, journalist, author and broadcaster.
- Russ Pomeroy, 91, American football player.
- Nadja Regin, 87, Serbian actress (From Russia with Love, Goldfinger, Runaway).
- George Edward Rueger, 89, American Roman Catholic prelate, Auxiliary Bishop of Worcester (1987–2005).
- Tele Samad, 74, Bangladeshi actor and comedian.
- Ángel Sertucha, 88, Spanish footballer (Osasuna, Athletic Bilbao, Sabadell).
- Mike Sheppard, 82, American baseball coach (Seton Hall Pirates).
- Marshall M. Sloane, 92, American entrepreneur.
- A. K. C. Sundaravel, 70, Indian politician, MLA (1991–1996), traffic collision.
- David J. Thouless, 84, British physicist, Nobel Prize laureate (2016).

=== 7 ===
- Peter Armstrong, 83, Australian rugby league player (St. George Dragons).
- Claire Ball, 77, American politician, member of the Ohio House of Representatives (1973–1982).
- Hugo Ballesteros Reyes, 88, Chilean politician, Senator (1969–1977) and Deputy (1957–1965), ambassador to the United Nations, brain cancer.
- Philip B. Benefiel, 95, American politician.
- Joe Bertony, 97, French-born Australian spy and engineer.
- Michael E. Busch, 72, American politician, Speaker (since 2003) and member of the Maryland House of Delegates (since 1987), pneumonia and nonalcoholic steatohepatitis.
- Seymour Cassel, 84, American actor (Faces, The Royal Tenenbaums, Dick Tracy), complications from Alzheimer's disease.
- Cho Yang-ho, 70, South Korean businessman (Korean Air, Hanjin).
- John William Ditter Jr., 97, American jurist, Senior Judge of the United States District Court for the Eastern District of Pennsylvania (since 1986).
- Polly Fleck, 86, Canadian poet.
- Tom Innes, 74, American computer scientist.
- Arie Irawan, 28, Malaysian golfer.
- Jean Paul Jacob, 81–82, Brazilian-American computer scientist.
- Wilbert Keon, 83, Canadian heart surgeon and politician, Senator (1990–2010).
- Víctor Manzanilla Schaffer, 94, Mexican politician and diplomat, Governor of Yucatán (1988–1991), Senator and Deputy, Ambassador to China and North Korea.
- Willie McPheat, 76, Scottish footballer (Sunderland, Hartlepool United, Airdrieonians).
- William B. Murray, 84, American opera baritone.
- Mya-Lecia Naylor, 16, English actress (Millie Inbetween, Cloud Atlas), hanged by misadventure.
- Neil D. Opdyke, 86, American geologist, heart failure.
- Luis Fernando Páez, 29, Paraguayan footballer, traffic collision.
- Sandy Ratcliff, 70, English actress (EastEnders).
- Billy Rosen, 90, American bridge player, winner of the Bermuda Bowl (1954).
- Tetsuhide Sasaki, 73, Japanese Olympic weightlifter.
- Ahmet Şenol, 93, Turkish Olympic wrestler (1948, 1952).
- Lodune Sincaid, 45, American mixed martial artist (WEC, PFC, The Ultimate Fighter 1).
- L. Eugene Smith, 97, American politician, member of the Pennsylvania House of Representatives (1963–1968, 1969–1986).
- Al Staley, 90, Canadian ice hockey player (New York Rangers).
- Jim Whiteside, 94, American politician.
- Jan Wraży, 75, Polish footballer (GKS Katowice, Valenciennes, national team).
- Xiong Zhaoren, 107, Chinese major general.

=== 8 ===
- Sheikh Abdul Aziz, Bangladeshi politician, Minister of Information (1973).
- Blase Bonpane, 89, American human rights activist.
- Clive Cohen, 73, English Anglican priest.
- Akwasi Evans, 70, American journalist and civil rights activist.
- Robert Forguites, 80, American politician, member of the Vermont House of Representatives (since 2015).
- Rex Garrod, 75, British roboteer (Brum, Robot Wars) and television presenter (The Secret Life of Machines), complications from Alzheimer's disease.
- Leif Haraldseth, 89, Norwegian trade unionist and politician, Minister of Local Government (1986–1987).
- Huang Yihe, 85, Chinese television director, created the CCTV New Year's Gala
- Navtej Hundal, Indian actor (Khalnayak, Tere Mere Sapne, Uri: The Surgical Strike).
- Josine Ianco-Starrels, 92, Romanian-born American art curator.
- Saad Jassim, 59, Iraqi footballer.
- Vasily Likhachyov, 67, Russian politician.
- Héctor del Mar, 76, Argentine-born Spanish professional wrestling commentator (WWE)
- Sir Alexander Reid, 3rd Baronet, 86, English aristocrat and public servant.
- Gaston Rousseau, 93, French racing cyclist.
- Roger Schofield, 82, British historian.
- Samuel "Bay" Taylor, 90, American baseball player (Kansas City Monarchs).
- Turgeon, 33, French racehorse, Cartier Champion Stayer (1991).
- Anzac Wallace, 76, New Zealand actor (Utu) and trade unionist, cancer.

=== 9 ===
- Bob Beckett, 83, Canadian ice hockey player (Boston Bruins, Providence Reds).
- Elwyn Berlekamp, 78, American mathematician.
- Richard E. Cole, 103, American air force officer, last surviving member of the Doolittle Raid.
- L. Perry Curtis, 86, American historian.
- Tiffany Day, 29, Australian Olympic judoka.
- Pieter de Lange, 93, South African academic, chairman of the Afrikaner Broederbond (1984–1994).
- Rod Galt, 67, Australian footballer (St Kilda, Carlton), stroke.
- Nikolai Gorbachev, 70, Belarusian sprint canoeist, Olympic (1972) and world champion (1974).
- Paul Hollander, 86, Hungarian-born American sociologist.
- James D. Hudnall, 61, American comic book writer (Espers).
- Kenneth L. Karst, 89, American legal scholar.
- Bhima Mandavi, 40, Indian politician, MLA (since 2019), bombing.
- K. M. Mani, 86, Indian politician, member of the Kerala Legislative Assembly (since 1965).
- Robert Pennock, 82, Canadian politician.
- Héctor Rivera Pérez, 85, Puerto Rican Roman Catholic prelate, Auxiliary Bishop of San Juan de Puerto Rico (1979–2009).
- Marilynn Smith, 89, American Hall of Fame golfer, Titleholders champion (1963, 1964).
- Charles Van Doren, 93, American academic, writer and television quiz contestant, part of the 1950s quiz show scandals.

=== 10 ===
- Werner Bardenhewer, 90, German Roman Catholic priest and humanitarian, Dean of Wiesbaden (1974–1996).
- Randall C. Berg Jr., 70, American attorney, Executive Director of the Florida Justice Institute (1978–2018), amyotrophic lateral sclerosis.
- Drupad Borgohain, 77, Indian politician, MP (1998–2004), kidney disease.
- Art Broback, 88, American politician, member of the Washington House of Representatives (1983–1985, 1991–1993).
- Earl Thomas Conley, 77, American country music singer-songwriter ("Holding Her and Loving You"), cerebral atrophy.
- Peter Corey, 72, British writer and actor.
- Gilbert Dubier, 87, French Olympic wrestler (1960).
- Tim Halliday, 73, British herpetologist.
- Keith Harrison, 73, Canadian novelist.
- Barbara Marx Hubbard, 89, American non-fiction writer.
- Irwin L. Jacobs, 77, American investor (Genmar Holdings, Fishing League Worldwide, Watkins Incorporated), suicide by gunshot.
- Raj Kumar Kapoor, 87, Indian actor (Hanste Zakhm, Dostana, Yeh Nazdeekiyan), producer (Oonche Log), director (Fauji).
- Walter White, 67, American football player (Kansas City Chiefs), pancreatic cancer.
- Estrella Zeledón Lizano, 89, Costa Rican politician, First Lady (1978–1982).

=== 11 ===
- Thomas A. Abercrombie, 68, American writer, liver cancer.
- Alexander V. Acebo, 91, American politician.
- Don Arnott, 83, Zimbabwean cricketer.
- Can Bartu, 83, Turkish basketball player (Fenerbahçe, national team) and footballer (national team).
- Geoffrey Chew, 94, American theoretical physicist.
- Ian Cognito, 60, British stand-up comedian, heart attack.
- Lewis Cooper, 81, Australian cricketer.
- Howard Copeland, 75, American politician, member of the Virginia House of Delegates (1981–1995), chordoma.
- Vijay Dev, 78, Indian academic.
- Dina, 62, Portuguese singer, pulmonary fibrosis.
- Stanley H. Fox, 90, American politician.
- Henryk Grotowski, 70, Polish Olympic field hockey player.
- Al Hester, 86, American author and academic.
- Tom Leehane, 91, Australian rules footballer (Carlton, Essendon).
- Héctor Menacho, 90, Peruvian Olympic rower.
- Jorge Menéndez, 67, Uruguayan doctor and politician, Minister of Defence (2016–2019).
- Monkey Punch, 81, Japanese manga artist (Lupin the Third), pneumonia.
- Bill Nelsen, 78, American football player (Pittsburgh Steelers, Cleveland Browns).
- Una-Mary Parker, 89, British journalist and novelist.
- Stanley Plumly, 79, American poet, multiple myeloma.
- Wayne Pomeroy, 96, American politician.
- Scott Sanderson, 62, American baseball player (Chicago Cubs, Montreal Expos, Los Angeles Angels), agent and broadcaster, cancer.
- Satan's Angel, 74, American exotic dancer, pneumonia.
- Dmitri Savitski, 75, Russian writer and poet.
- Osamu Sekita, Japanese animator (Hero Tales, Beyblade, Mobile Suit Gundam).
- Peter Smedley, 76, Australian businessman, Chairman of Arrium.
- Gary Stewart, 62, American music executive and archivist (Rhino Records, Apple Inc.).
- Max van Weezel, 67, Dutch journalist, pancreatic cancer.

=== 12 ===
- Ivor Broadis, 96, English footballer (Carlisle United, national team).
- Amos Bullocks, 80, American football player (Dallas Cowboys, Pittsburgh Steelers, BC Lions).
- André Bureau, 83, Canadian lawyer and communications executive.
- Italo Casali, 78, Sammarinese Olympic sports shooter (1972, 1976).
- Alajdin Demiri, 64, Albanian politician.
- Georgia Engel, 70, American actress (The Mary Tyler Moore Show, Open Season, Everybody Loves Raymond).
- Forrest Gregg, 85, American Hall of Fame football player (Green Bay Packers) and coach (Cincinnati Bengals, Cleveland Browns), complications from Parkinson's disease.
- Ronald Paul Herzog, 76, American Roman Catholic prelate, Bishop of Alexandria (2005–2017).
- Ric Holt, 78, Canadian computer scientist.
- Robert F. Inger, 98, American herpetologist.
- Abel Leal, 79, Colombian baseball player.
- John McEnery, 75, British actor (Romeo and Juliet, Nicholas and Alexandra, The Land That Time Forgot).
- Norrie Muir, 70, Scottish mountaineer.
- Lindsay Parsons, 73, English football player (Bristol Rovers, Torquay United) and coach (Stoke City).
- Paul Rawlinson, 56, British lawyer, head of Baker McKenzie (since 2016).
- Tommy Smith, 74, English footballer (Liverpool, national team), dementia.
- Carol Thomas, South African gynecologist.

=== 13 ===
- Francisca Aguirre, 88, Spanish poet, Premio Nacional de las Letras Españolas winner (2018).
- Donald Ault, 76, American literary scholar.
- Ron Austin, 90, Australian LGBT rights activist.
- D. Babu Paul, 78, Indian civil servant, multiple organ failure.
- Gerry Becker, 68, American actor (Spider-Man, Man on the Moon, Eraser), complications from diabetes.
- Rodolfo Francisco Bobadilla Mata, 86, Guatemalan Roman Catholic prelate, Bishop of Huehuetenango (1996–2012).
- Tony Buzan, 76, English author and educational consultant.
- Wally Carr, 64, Australian boxer, cancer.
- Neus Català, 103, Spanish Resistance fighter, Holocaust survivor and political activist.
- Mark Connolly, 63, American politician, brain hemorrhage.
- Michael Coper, 72, Australian legal scholar (Australian National University).
- Quentin Fiore, 99, American graphic designer.
- S. Thomas Gagliano, 87, American politician, member of the New Jersey Senate (1978–1989).
- Norman Garwood, 73, English production designer (Brazil, Glory, Hook).
- Paul Greengard, 93, American neuroscientist, Nobel Prize laureate (2000).
- Kwame Gyekye, 79, Ghanaian philosopher.
- Marsha Hanen, 82, Canadian academic, Vice Chancellor of the University of Winnipeg (1989–1999), non-Hodgkin's lymphoma.
- Michael L. Hess, 76, American cardiologist.
- Winifred Jordan, 99, British Olympic sprinter (1948).
- Norio Kaifu, 75, Japanese astronomer, director-general of the National Astronomical Observatory (2000–2006), president of the IAU (2012–2015), pancreatic cancer.
- Bud Konheim, 84, American businessman, injuries sustained in fall.
- Bamapada Mukherjee, 97, Indian politician.
- Billy Myers, 95, Canadian football player (Toronto Argonauts).
- Mamman Nasir, 89, Nigerian judge, President of the courts of appeals (1978–1992).
- Anne Patrizio, British LGBT rights activist.
- Galen Rathbun, 74, American behavioral ecologist, melanoma.
- Paul Raymond, 73, English keyboardist and guitarist (Plastic Penny, UFO, Savoy Brown), heart attack.
- J. K. Rithesh, 46, Indian actor and politician, heart attack.
- S. K. Shivakumar, 66, Indian space scientist, complications from jaundice.
- Ján Starší, 85, Slovak ice hockey player and coach.
- LeRoy Washburn, 84, Canadian politician, member of the Legislative Assembly of New Brunswick (1974–1982).
- Lydia Wideman, 98, Finnish cross-country skier, Olympic champion (1952).
- Yvette Williams, 89, New Zealand Hall of Fame athlete, Olympic (1952) and Commonwealth (1950, 1954) champion.

=== 14 ===
- Bibi Andersson, 83, Swedish actress (The Seventh Seal, Wild Strawberries, Persona), complications from a stroke.
- Giuseppe Ciarrapico, 85, Italian politician and football executive, Senator (2008–2013) and President of A.S. Roma (1991–1993).
- Colin Collindridge, 98, English footballer (Sheffield United, Nottingham Forest).
- David Brion Davis, 92, American historian.
- Elma Davis, 51, South African lawn bowler, shot.
- Denis Dupéré, 70, Canadian ice hockey player (Toronto Maple Leafs, Washington Capitals, St. Louis Blues).
- Rusdi Genest, 84-85, Canadian sculptor.
- Stephen L. Harris, 82, American biblical scholar.
- Nand Lal, 74, Indian politician.
- Abdallah Lamrani, 72–73, Moroccan footballer (FAR Rabat, national team), Olympics (1972).
- Anne Lewis, 56, American lawyer, cancer.
- Ronald G. Lewis, 77, American social worker and activist.
- John MacLeod, 81, American basketball coach (Phoenix Suns, Notre Dame), complications from Alzheimer's disease.
- Mirjana Marković, 76, Serbian politician and fugitive from justice, pneumonia.
- Hessel Miedema, 90, Dutch art historian.
- Dmitri Nabokov, 42, Russian ice hockey player (Krylya Sovetov Moscow, Chicago Blackhawks, New York Islanders).
- Jacek Namieśnik, 69, Polish chemist, rector of Gdańsk University of Technology.
- Gene Wolfe, 87, American science fiction (The Book of the New Sun) and fantasy writer (Soldier of Sidon), Nebula (1974, 1981) and multi-Locus Award winner, heart disease.

=== 15 ===
- Warren Adler, 91, American author (The War of the Roses, Random Hearts), liver cancer.
- Gustavo Arias Murueta, 95, Mexican painter, sculptor and poet.
- Jerry Clack, 92, American classics scholar.
- Marcelo Dascal, 78, Brazilian-born Israeli philosopher and linguist.
- Owen Garriott, 88, American astronaut (Skylab 3).
- Sithembile Gumbo, 56, Zimbabwean politician, MP for Lupane, traffic collision.
- Rex Harry, 82, Australian cricketer (Victoria).
- Lloyd James, 82, Bermudian cricketer.
- Louise H. Kellogg, 59, American geophysicist.
- Aleksandar Kostov, 81, Bulgarian football player (Levski Sofia, national team) and coach (AS Marsa).
- Malky McCormick, 76, Scottish cartoonist, vascular dementia.
- Sir Roger Moate, 80, British politician, MP (1970–1997), cancer.
- Sol Pais, 18, American student, subject of a FBI manhunt, suicide by gunshot.
- Don Perry, 89, Canadian ice hockey player (New Haven Blades) and coach (Los Angeles Kings).
- Quinzinho, 45, Angolan footballer (Alverca, Xiamen Lanshi, national team), heart attack.
- Elaine Rapp, 91, American sculptor.
- Les Reed, 83, English songwriter ("It's Not Unusual", "Delilah", "The Last Waltz").
- José María Rico, 84, Costa Rican lawyer, First Gentleman (2010–2014), complications from Alzheimer's disease.
- P. N. Shankar, 74, Indian fluid dynamicist.
- Winston L. Shelton, 96, American inventor and entrepreneur.
- Noel Starblanket, 72, Canadian politician, chief of the National Indian Brotherhood (1976–1980).
- Roland Andrew Sweet, 79, American mathematician and computer scientist.
- J. Michael Yates, 81, Canadian poet and author.

=== 16 ===
- Vladimir Boltyansky, 93, Russian mathematician.
- Aidan Brady, 79, Irish rugby union player.
- Ricardo Chibanga, 76, Mozambican bullfighter.
- Francis Croissant, 83–84, French archaeologist and art historian.
- Jörg Demus, 90, Austrian pianist.
- Dale Denno, 68, American politician, member of the Maine House of Representatives (2016–2019), lung cancer.
- Ahmad Eghtedari, 93–94, Iranian teacher, lawyer and writer, complications from lung and kidney deficiencies.
- Guro Fjellanger, 55, Norwegian politician, Minister of the Environment (1997–2000).
- Jose Mari Gonzales, 80, Filipino actor and politician, pneumonia.
- Kent Harris, 88, American songwriter ("Shoppin' for Clothes") and record producer, cancer.
- Len Hoogerbrug, 89, Dutch-born New Zealand architect.
- Kiyoshi Kawakubo, 89, Japanese voice actor (Gurren Lagann, Bubblegum Crisis).
- Bill LeCaine, 81, Canadian ice hockey player (Pittsburgh Penguins).
- Pietro Marascalchi, 87, Italian Olympic wrestler.
- Abraham D. Mattam, 96, Indian Syro-Malabar Catholic hierarch, Bishop of Satna (1968–1999).
- Fay McKenzie, 101, American actress (Down Mexico Way, Heart of the Rio Grande, Breakfast at Tiffany's).
- Ignace Murwanashyaka, 55, Rwandan militant, leader of the Democratic Forces for the Liberation of Rwanda.
- Bazilije Pandžić, 101, Croatian historian, archivist and orientalist.
- Harding Peterson, 89, American baseball player and general manager (Pittsburgh Pirates).
- Valentin Plătăreanu, 82, Romanian actor and director.
- Juan Francisco Rodríguez, 68, Spanish European bantamweight champion boxer (1978).
- Charles Joel Stone, 82, American statistician and mathematician.
- Edward Streator, 88, American diplomat.
- Suzanne Twelftree, 62, Australian Paralympic wheelchair tennis player and powerlifter (1992, 2000).
- Xia Suisheng, 94, Chinese surgeon, pioneer in organ transplantation.
- Mountaineers killed in the Howse Peak avalanche:

- Hansjörg Auer, 35, Austrian.
- David Lama, 28, Austrian.
- Jess Roskelley, 36, American.

=== 17 ===
- Donald Aronson, 89, American mathematician.
- Cathy Barton, 63, American folk musician.
- Tony Bird, 74, Malawian-born South African singer-songwriter.
- Peter Cartwright, 78, New Zealand lawyer, viceregal consort (2001–2006).
- Chet Coppock, 70, American broadcast journalist (WMAQ, WSNS-TV) and sports talk personality (Sporting News Radio), traffic collision.
- George Finkel, 82, American TV sports producer and director.
- Juliann Bluitt Foster, 80, American dentist.
- Alan García, 69, Peruvian sociologist and politician, President (1985–1990, 2006–2011), suicide by gunshot.
- Frederick Hemke, 83, American saxophonist.
- Ryszard Kaja, 57, Polish graphic artist.
- Norman Jacobsen, 89, Canadian politician.
- Kazuo Koike, 82, Japanese manga artist (Lone Wolf and Cub, Lady Snowblood), pneumonia.
- Timothy Lawson-Cruttenden, 64, British solicitor.
- Ya'akov Nehoshtan, 93, Israeli politician and diplomat, member of the Knesset (1969–1974), ambassador to the Netherlands (1982–1985).
- Folagbade Olateru Olagbegi III, 77, Nigerian ruler, Olowo of Owo (since 1999).
- Sir Clive Rose, 97, British diplomat.
- James V. Schall, 91, American Jesuit Roman Catholic priest, teacher and writer.
- Pieter Verhoeff, 81, Dutch film director (The Dream, The Sunday Child, The Moving True Story of a Woman Ahead of Her Time).
- Alex Weil, 67, American filmmaker (One Rat Short).

=== 18 ===
- Bita do Barão, 86, Brazilian pai-de-santo, religious leader
- John Bowen, 94, British novelist and dramatist.
- Ken Buehler, 99, American basketball player (Sheboygan Red Skins, Fort Wayne Zollner Pistons).
- Richard Dickinson Chambers, 84, British chemist.
- Victoria Cook, 85-86, American archer, heart attack.
- Con de Lange, 38, South African-born Scottish cricketer (Northamptonshire, national team), brain tumour.
- Pat Dwyer, 72, English boxer.
- Ivo Frosio, 89, Swiss footballer (Grasshoppers, Lugano, national team).
- Samuel H. Gruber, 80, American marine biologist.
- Jamil Jalibi, 89, Pakistani linguist, writer and academic administrator, vice-chancellor of the University of Karachi (1983–1987).
- H. M. Jayawardena, 69, Sri Lankan composer and musician.
- Andrew Mallard, 56, British-born Australian ex-prisoner, wrongfully convicted of murder, hit-and-run.
- William F. McCauley, 87, American vice admiral.
- Lyra McKee, 29, Northern Irish journalist, shot.
- Don Melnick, 65, American biologist and conservationist.
- Hasibul Islam Mizan, 62, Bangladeshi film director.
- Ira Neimark, 97, American retail executive (Bergdorf Goodman).
- Kate Nicholson, 89, English painter.
- Jennifer Phipps, 87, Canadian actress.
- Iča Putrih, 77, Slovene comedian.
- Eddie Tigner, 92, American blues keyboardist, singer and songwriter.
- Andreas Ugland, 93, Norwegian ship's engineer.
- Willem Hendrik Velema, 89, Dutch theologian.
- Lorraine Warren, 92, American paranormal investigator and author, subject of The Conjuring.
- Siegmar Wätzlich, 71, German footballer (Dynamo Dresden, East Germany national team), Olympic bronze medalist (1972).
- Zheng Guo'en, 89, Chinese filmmaker and educator.

=== 19 ===
- Martin Böttcher, 91, German composer, arranger and conductor.
- Chitrabhanu, 96, Indian religious leader.
- Zora Dirnbach, 89, Croatian journalist and writer.
- Hindraj Divekar, 65, Indian musician.
- Cally Gault, 91, American football coach.
- Renald Knysh, 87, Belarusian artistic gymnastics coach.
- William Krehm, 105, Canadian Trotskyist activist and Spanish Civil War veteran.
- Philip Liner, 93, British-born New Zealand radio broadcaster (National Radio).
- MC Sapão, 40, Brazilian singer-songwriter, pneumonia.
- Michael Lyons, 75, British sculptor.
- Massimo Marino, 59, Italian television presenter and actor.
- Gwen Marston, 82, American quilter.
- Roy Mugerwa, 77, Ugandan physician.
- Yuriy Pimenov, 61, Russian rower, Olympic silver medalist (1980).
- Francis Sanziri, 62, Ghanaian military officer, heart attack.
- Patrick Sercu, 74, Belgian cyclist, Olympic champion (1964).
- Rodolfo Severino Jr., 82, Filipino diplomat, Secretary-General of the ASEAN (1998–2002), ambassador to Malaysia (1989–1992), complications from Parkinson's disease.
- Elmer Sprague, 94-95, American philosopher.
- Peter Stoddart, 84, English cricketer (Marylebone Cricket Club).
- Kawaski Trawick, 32, African American trainer and dancer.
- Verena Wagner Lafferentz, 98, German Wagner family member.
- Xiao Yang, 80, Chinese judge, President of the Supreme People's Court (1998–2008), Minister of Justice (1993–1998).
- Okiharu Yasuoka, 79, Japanese politician, Minister of Justice (2000, 2008), pancreatic cancer.
- Michael Yorke, 80, British Anglican priest, Dean of Lichfield (1999–2005).

=== 20 ===
- Carl S. Adams, 101, American politician.
- Bed Prakash Agarwal, 83, Indian politician, Odisha MLA (1974–1980, 1990–1995, 2000–2004, since 2009).
- Enrico Alberto, 85, French-Italian footballer.
- Rolf Amrein, 89, Swiss Olympic sailor (1968, 1972).
- Joe Armstrong, 68, British computer scientist, designer of Erlang.
- Jarosław Biernat, 58, Polish footballer (Eintracht Frankfurt, SG Union Solingen, SpVgg Bayreuth).
- Luděk Bukač, 83, Czech ice hockey player and manager (Sparta Praha).
- Reggie Cobb, 50, American football player (Tampa Bay Buccaneers, Green Bay Packers, New York Jets), heart attack.
- Peter Colotka, 94, Slovak academic, lawyer and politician, Prime Minister of the Slovak Socialist Republic (1969–1988).
- Terence Dolan, 76, Irish lexicographer.
- Joyce Evans, 89, Australian photographer.
- Bazlul Karim Falu, 68, Bangladeshi politician.
- Monir Shahroudy Farmanfarmaian, 96, Iranian artist.
- Brian Fentiman, 72, British rower, liver cancer.
- Ernie Fischer, 88, American Olympic wrestler (1956).
- Karl Grob, 72, Swiss footballer (Zürich, national team), heart failure.
- Charlie Kelsall, 98, Welsh footballer.
- Galina Kmit, 87, Russian photographer.
- Braulio Lara, 30, Dominican baseball player (SK Wyverns), traffic collision.
- Kiyonomori Masao, 84, Japanese sumo wrestler, pneumonia.
- Pedro Matrona, 91, Curaçaoan Olympic footballer (1952).
- S. Muthiah, 89, Indian historian.
- Amar Pal, 96, Indian folk singer, heart attack.
- David V. Picker, 87, American film executive (United Artists, Paramount Pictures) and producer (The Jerk), complications from colon cancer.
- Mavis Pusey, 90, Jamaican-born American abstract artist.
- Jacqueline Saburido, 40, Venezuelan-American anti-drunk driving campaigner, cancer.
- Phil Solomon, 65, American experimental filmmaker, complications following surgery.
- Doreen Spooner, 91, British photographer.
- Atli Heimir Sveinsson, 80, Icelandic composer.
- Pranita Talukdar, 83–84, Indian academic, politician, social worker, Assam Legislative Assembly (1967–1978).
- Valdiram, 36, Brazilian footballer (CR Vasco da Gama), beaten.
- Claud Walker, 84, American politician.
- John Whitworth, 74, British poet.
- Jayne Wrightsman, 99, American philanthropist and fine arts collector.
- Wu Yili, 87–88, Chinese-Singaporean pianist.
- David Zafer, 85, British-born Canadian violinist.

=== 21 ===
- Suzanne Carrell, 96, French-born American educator.
- Hannelore Elsner, 76, German actress (Student of the Bedroom, The Black Forest Clinic, Die Kommissarin), cancer.
- Violeta Gindeva, 72, Bulgarian actress and academic (Plovdiv University "Paisii Hilendarski").
- Steve Golin, 64, American film producer (Spotlight, Eternal Sunshine of the Spotless Mind, The Revenant), Oscar winner (2016), cancer.
- Duncan Green, 93, British military officer.
- David A. Hamburg, 93, American psychiatrist, ischemic colitis.
- Aminul Haque, 76, Bangladeshi politician, MP (1991–2006), Minister of Posts and Telecommunications (2001–2006), liver cancer.
- Zahran Hashim, 33, Islamist militant, suicide bombing.
- Heidi Hetzer, 81, German entrepreneur and world tour rally driver.
- Polly Higgins, 50, Scottish environmentalist, cancer.
- Sigurður Jónsson, 96, Icelandic Olympic swimmer (1948).
- Horst Kassner, 81, German motorcycle road racer.
- Ollie Keller, 90, American football player and coach.
- Ken Kercheval, 83, American actor (Dallas, Network, The Seven-Ups), pneumonia.
- Harry Marks, 88, American broadcast designer, co-founder of TED.
- Richard P. Matty, 86, American politician.
- Shantha Mayadunne, Sri Lankan chef, bombing.
- Terence Mitchell, 89, British archaeologist and scholar.
- Abu Saleh Mohammad Saeed, 73, Bangladeshi politician.
- Shivlal Sharma, 80, Indian politician, MLA (1985–1990), cardiac arrest.
- Joyce Steele, 83, American baseball player (Kalamazoo Lassies).
- Lucy C. Turnbull, 87, American classicist.
- Amelia Vargas, 91, Cuban actress (Arroz con Leche, The Phantom of the Operetta, Cleopatra Was Candida) and dancer.
- John Wells-Thorpe, 90, English architect, Parkinson's disease.
- Frances Winfield, 77, American author.

=== 22 ===
- Patricia Battin, 89, American librarian.
- Krasimir Bezinski, 57, Bulgarian footballer (CSKA Sofia, Portimonense, national team), colorectal cancer.
- Robert L. Butler, 92, American lawyer and politician, Mayor of Marion, Illinois (1963–2018).
- Deborah Cook, 80, American operatic soprano, Alzheimer's disease.
- Jim Dunbar, 89, American radio program director (KGO).
- Henry Rice Guild, 90, American lawyer.
- Heather Harper, 88, Northern Irish soprano, Grammy winner (1980, 1985).
- Huang Zhanyue, 92, Chinese archaeologist (Mausoleum of the Nanyue King).
- Stanisław Jędryka, 85, Polish film director (The Impossible Goodbye).
- Simon Kaipuram, 65, Indian Roman Catholic prelate, Bishop of Balasore (since 2013).
- Ventseslav Konstantinov, 78, Bulgarian writer, aphorist and translator.
- John L'Heureux, 84, American author, complications from Parkinson's disease.
- Lê Đức Anh, 98, Vietnamese military officer and politician, Chief of the General Staff (1986–1987), Minister of Defence (1987–1992) and President (1992–1997), complications from a stroke.
- William Levy, 80, American writer.
- Billy McNeill, 79, Scottish football player (Celtic, national team) and manager (Aberdeen), dementia.
- Andy O'Donnell, 94, American basketball player.
- John Quinn, 78, Canadian professional wrestler (NWA, WWWF).
- Dave Samuels, 70, American percussionist (Spyro Gyra).
- Tserendonoin Sanjaa, 82, Mongolian Olympic wrestler.
- Greg Theakston, 65, American comics artist (Mad).
- František Xaver Thuri, 79, Czech composer.
- Oiva Toikka, 87, Finnish glass designer.
- Julio Toresani, 51, Argentine football player (River Plate, Boca Juniors) and manager (Colón), suicide by hanging.

=== 23 ===
- Philip Abbott, 74, American political scientist.
- László Balogh, 61, Hungarian Olympic sport shooter, traffic collision.
- Henry W. Bloch, 96, American businessman and philanthropist, co-founder of H&R Block.
- Edward Brooks, 76, American politician, member of the Wisconsin State Assembly (2009–2018), leukemia.
- Matthew Buckland, 44, South African internet entrepreneur and businessman, cancer.
- Earl Edwards, 82, American songwriter ("Duke of Earl").
- Wendelin Enders, 96, German politician, MP (1967–1987).
- Mario Fabbrocino, 76, Italian mobster.
- Fermo Favini, 83, Italian football player and executive.
- Viggo Fossum, 69, Norwegian politician.
- Della Godfrey, Indian politician, MLA (1994–2004).
- Charles Gheerbrant, 94, French politician, Deputy (1993–1997), Mayor of Saint-Nicolas (1973–2001).
- Max Golser, 78, Austrian Olympic ski jumper (1968, 1972).
- Joseph Gryzik, 91, Polish-born American soccer player (A.A.C. Eagles).
- George Haigh, 103, English footballer (Stockport County).
- Jean, 98, Luxembourgish royal, Grand Duke (1964–2000), pulmonary infection.
- Edward Kelsey, 88, English actor (The Archers, Danger Mouse, Wallace & Gromit: The Curse of the Were-Rabbit).
- Denton Lotz, 80, American Baptist minister, Secretary of the Baptist World Alliance (1988–2007).
- Mark Medoff, 79, American playwright (When You Comin' Back, Red Ryder?, Children of a Lesser God) and screenwriter, Tony winner (1980), complications from a fall.
- Voja Mirić, 86, Serbian actor (Death and the Dervish).
- Juan José Muñante, 70, Peruvian footballer (Universitario, Pumas, national team), lung cancer.
- Johnny Neumann, 68, American basketball player (Memphis Tams, Virginia Squires, Los Angeles Lakers), cancer.
- Nils John Nilsson, 86, American computer scientist.
- Tadeusz Pluciński, 92, Polish actor (Westerplatte, Stawka większa niż życie, Czterdziestolatek).
- Lorenzo Quinteros, 73, Argentine actor (Man Facing Southeast, A Wall of Silence, Valentín).
- Pablo Ramirez, 26, American skateboarder, traffic collision.
- Terry Rawlings, 85, British film editor (Alien, Blade Runner, Chariots of Fire), heart failure.
- José Rizo Castellón, 74, Nicaraguan politician, economist and lawyer, Vice President (2002–2005).
- Jotindra Nath Roy, 84, Indian politician, MLA (1991-2006).
- Peter Skipper, 61, English footballer (Hull City), complications from a stroke.
- Scott W. Sloan, 64, Australian civil engineer and academic.
- John Shorter Stevens, 85, American politician, member of the North Carolina House of Representatives (1969–1976).
- Charity Sunshine Tillemann-Dick, 35, American soprano and presenter, idiopathic pulmonary hypertension.
- Alan G. Thomas, 92, British materials scientist.
- David Winters, 80, English-American actor and choreographer (West Side Story).
- Johan Witteveen, 97, Dutch politician and economist, Deputy Prime Minister (1967–1971), Managing Director of the IMF (1973–1978).

=== 24 ===
- Saleh Ahmed, 83, Bangladeshi actor (Srabon Megher Din, Aguner Poroshmoni).
- Chris Albertson, 87, American journalist, writer, and record producer.
- Françoise Barrière, 76, French composer.
- Stanley S. Bergen Jr., 89, American physician and academic administrator.
- Benson K. Buffham, 99, American intelligence official, Deputy Director of the National Security Agency (1974–1978).
- Johnny Green, 81, American football player (Buffalo Bills, New York Jets, Toronto Argonauts).
- Hubert Hahne, 84, German racing driver, dementia.
- Martin Kilson, 88, American political scientist.
- Francisco Lerma Martínez, 74, Spanish-born Mozambican Roman Catholic prelate, Bishop of Gurué (since 2010).
- Abbassi Madani, 88, Algerian Islamic militant and politician, President of the Islamic Salvation Front (1989–1992).
- Eckhard Mannischeff, 75, German Olympic fencer.
- Jean-Pierre Marielle, 87, French actor (Cookies, Without Apparent Motive, The Da Vinci Code).
- Zoran Marojević, 76, Serbian basketball player, Olympic silver medalist (1968).
- Sergey Pogorelov, 44, Russian handball player, Olympic champion (2000).
- Feargal Quinn, 82, Irish businessman and politician, founder of Superquinn, Senator (1993–2016).
- Dick Rivers, 74, French rock and roll singer (Les Chats Sauvages), cancer.
- Conrado San Martín, 98, Spanish actor (The Princess of the Ursines, The Colossus of Rhodes, Riders of the Dawn).
- John Simpson, 85, English Anglican priest, Dean of Canterbury (1986–2000).
- Dennis Stanford, 76, American archaeologist.
- Babill Stray-Pedersen, 76, Norwegian physician.
- Michael Wolf, 64, German photographer.

=== 25 ===
- Vidya Sagar Chaudhary, 85, Indian politician.
- Josip Ćuk, 83, Yugoslav Olympic sports shooter.
- Michiro Endo, 68, Japanese musician (The Stalin), pancreatic cancer.
- Povl Falk-Jensen, 98, Danish resistance member during World War II.
- Alberto Giovannini, 63–64, Italian economist.
- Gregory Gray, 59, Northern Irish singer-songwriter (Rosetta Stone).
- Tom Gray, 74, American Olympic speed skater.
- Robbert de Greef, 27, Dutch road racing cyclist, heart attack.
- Svante Grundberg, 75, Swedish actor and comedian (Sällskapsresan, Göta kanal eller Vem drog ur proppen?).
- John Havlicek, 79, American Hall of Fame basketball player (Boston Celtics), complications from Parkinson's disease.
- Kurohimeyama Hideo, 70, Japanese sumo wrestler, pneumonia.
- Larry "Flash" Jenkins, 63, American actor (Ferris Bueller's Day Off, Fletch, The White Shadow), heart attack.
- Dirceu Krüger, 74, Brazilian footballer (Coritiba), heart attack.
- Michael Lavery, 84, Northern Irish barrister.
- Manuel Lujan Jr., 90, American politician, Secretary of the Interior (1989–1993), member of the U.S. House of Representatives (1969–1989).
- Faty Papy, 28, Burundian footballer (MVV Maastricht, Bidvest Wits, national team), heart attack.
- Sir Nigel Seely, 95, English aristocrat.
- Morton Sosland, 93, American businessman.
- Paloma Tortajada, 49, Spanish broadcaster and journalist.
- Peter Vander Pyl, 85, Canadian Olympic hockey player (1964).

=== 26 ===
- Abdul-Latif Arabiyat, 86, Jordanian politician, Speaker of the House of Representatives (1990–1993).
- Jimmy Banks, 54, American soccer player (Milwaukee Wave, national team) and coach (Milwaukee School of Engineering), pancreatic cancer.
- Elina Bystritskaya, 91, Russian actress (Unfinished Story, And Quiet Flows the Don, All Remains to People), People's Artist of the USSR (1978).
- Bruce Carmichael, 85, Canadian ice hockey player (Vancouver Canucks).
- Zé do Carmo, 85, Brazilian ceramist, heart attack.
- Nasser Farbod, 96, Iranian political activist and military officer, Chief of Staff (1979).
- Jessie Lawrence Ferguson, 76, American actor (Prince of Darkness, Darkman, Boyz n the Hood).
- Nancy Fouts, 74, American artist.
- Fu Xinqi, 100, Chinese architect, academic, and painter.
- Thomas A. Hanna, 92, American politician.
- Verna Hart, 58, American artist, seizure.
- Anthony J. Hilder, 84, American surf music producer, radio host and conspiracy film maker.
- Eric Kent, 99, Australian politician, member of the Victorian Legislative Council (1970–1976, 1979–1985).
- Anil Kumar Koneru, Indian film producer (Sriramachandrulu, Radha Gopalam, Allari Bullodu), cancer.
- Frederick Niels Larsen, 87, American religious leader, President of the Remnant Church of Jesus Christ of Latter Day Saints.
- Colette Lorand, 96, Swiss opera singer.
- Sir David McNee, 94, Scottish police officer, Commissioner of the Metropolitan Police (1977–1982).
- Lotte Newman, 90, British physician.
- Petar Omčikus, 92, Serbian painter.
- Steven Paul, 64, British Olympic fencer (1980, 1984, 1992) and stuntman (Die Another Day), fall.
- Ken Rothman, 83, American politician, Lt. Governor of Missouri (1981–1985), member (1963–1981) and Speaker of the Missouri House of Representatives (1977–1981).
- Richard Ryscavage, 74, American sociologist and political philosopher.
- Mae Schmidle, 91, American politician, member of the Connecticut House of Representatives (1981–1991).
- Ellen Schwiers, 88, German actress (When the Bells Sound Clearly, The Inheritance of Bjorndal, God's Thunder).
- Reijo Taipale, 79, Finnish singer, dementia.
- C. K. Tedam, 93, Ghanaian teacher and politician.

=== 27 ===
- Adrian Brown, 89, British stage and television director and producer (Top Secret, No Hiding Place, Emergency – Ward 10).
- Bart Chilton, 58, American civil servant, Commissioner of the Commodity Futures Trading Commission (2007–2014), pancreatic cancer.
- Edward Fraenkel, 91, German-born British mathematician.
- Teva Harrison, 42, Canadian-American writer and cartoonist, breast cancer.
- Dan LaRose, 80, American football player (Detroit Lions).
- Gerald James Larson, 81, American indologist.
- Aleksey Lebed, 64, Russian military officer and politician, Head of the Republic of Khakassia (1997–2009), internal bleeding.
- Ruth Macrides, 69, American historian.
- Jack de Mello, 102, American composer.
- Jerzy Moes, 83, Polish actor.
- María de los Ángeles Moreno, 74, Mexican politician, Secretary of Fisheries (1988–1991).
- Negasso Gidada, 75, Ethiopian politician, President (1995–2001).
- Jón Karl Sigurðsson, 87, Icelandic Olympic alpine skier (1952).
- Vasanthi Stanley, 56, Indian politician, MP (2008–2014).
- Gene Stephens, 86, American baseball player (Boston Red Sox).
- Mahfuz Ullah, 69, Bangladeshi journalist and environmentalist, heart and lung failure.
- Joseph Ward, 76, English tenor.
- Joe T. Wood, 96, American politician, member of the Georgia House of Representatives (1966–1989).

=== 28 ===
- Anisur Rahman Anis, 78, Bangladeshi actor.
- William S. Banowsky, 83, American preacher and academic, President of Pepperdine University (1971–1978) and the University of Oklahoma (1978–1984).
- Bruce Bickford, 72, American animator (Baby Snakes, The Dub Room Special, The Amazing Mr. Bickford).
- Caroline Bittencourt, 37, Brazilian model, drowned.
- Sylvia Bretschneider, 58, German politician, member of the Landtag of Mecklenburg-Vorpommern (since 1994), cancer.
- Wayson Choy, 80, Canadian writer (The Jade Peony, All That Matters).
- Dan Conners, 78, American football player (Oakland Raiders).
- Dax Cowart, 71, American attorney, complications from leukemia and liver cancer.
- Lothar Geisler, 82, German footballer (VfL Bochum, Borussia Dortmund).
- Zaki al-Ghul, 92–93, Palestinian politician.
- Daniel Horlaville, 73, French footballer (Paris, Rouen, national team).
- Thomas Jessell, 67, American biochemist, neurodegenerative disease.
- Damon Keith, 96, American judge, member of the U.S. Court of Appeals for the Sixth Circuit (since 1977), complications from leukemia and cardiovascular disease.
- Barry Latman, 82, American baseball player (Chicago White Sox, Cleveland Indians, Houston Astros).
- Maria LaYacona, 92, American-born Jamaican photographer.
- Jo Sullivan Loesser, 91, American actress (The Most Happy Fella), heart failure.
- Richard Lugar, 87, American politician, U.S. Senator (1977–2013), mayor of Indianapolis (1968–1976), complications from CIDP.
- Karol Modzelewski, 81, Polish historian, writer, politician and academic.
- Genrikh Novozhilov, 93, Soviet and Russian aircraft designer.
- Maurício Peixoto, 98, Brazilian engineer and mathematician.
- Alejandro Planchart, 83, Venezuelan-born American musicologist.
- Otto Rogers, 83, Canadian painter.
- Bernt Rougthvedt, 62, Norwegian historian and crime writer, cancer.
- Stephen O. Saxe, 89, American graphic designer and art historian.
- Bettina Schmidt, 58, German Olympic luger.
- John Singleton, 51, American film director and television producer (Boyz n the Hood, 2 Fast 2 Furious, Snowfall), stroke.
- Sir William Slack, 94, British surgeon.
- Jah Stitch, 69, Jamaican reggae singer.
- Menachem Mendel Taub, 96, Israeli Hasidic rebbe and Holocaust survivor.

=== 29 ===
- Carlo Maria Abate, 86, Italian auto racing driver.
- Lee K. Abbott, 71, American writer, cancer.
- Doug Adair, 89, American television news anchor (WKYC, WCMH).
- Eldon Bargewell, 71, American army general, commander of Delta Force, lawnmower rollover.
- Stevie Chalmers, 83, Scottish footballer (Celtic, national team).
- Albert-Marie de Monléon, 82, French Roman Catholic prelate, Bishop of Pamiers (1988–1999) and Meaux (1999–2012).
- René Dybkær, 93, Danish Olympic fencer (1948, 1952).
- Tom Ellis, 86, American journalist and television news anchor (WBZ-TV, WCVB-TV, New England Cable News), cancer.
- Franklin M. Fisher, 84, American economist.
- George W. Homsey, 93, American architect.
- Vijaykumar Khandre, 60, Indian politician, MLA (1989–1999), cardiac arrest.
- Jamsrangiin Ölzii-Orshikh, 52, Mongolian Olympic racing cyclist (1992).
- Nelli Korbukova, 57, Russian canoeist.
- Grigori F. Krivosheev, 89, Russian military historian.
- Wojciech Królikowski, 92, Polish physicist.
- Donald Lan, 88, American politician, Secretary of State of New Jersey (1977–1982).
- George Litto, 88, American film producer and talent agent, complications from aortic stenosis.
- Betty Lockwood, Baroness Lockwood, 95, British political activist and life peer, Member of the House of Lords (1978–2017).
- Gino Marchetti, 93, American Hall of Fame football player (Baltimore Colts), pneumonia.
- John Llewellyn Moxey, 94, British film director (The City of the Dead, Foxhole in Cairo, Circus of Fear).
- Les Murray, 80, Australian poet.
- José Rodrigues Neto, 69, Brazilian footballer (Flamengo, Ferro Carril Oeste, national team), thrombosis.
- Makoto Ogino, 59, Japanese manga artist (Spirit Warrior), kidney failure.
- Su Yu-chang, 78, Chinese martial artist, scholar and physician.
- Josef Šural, 28, Czech footballer (Slovan Liberec, Sparta Prague, national team), traffic collision.
- Ellen Tauscher, 67, American politician, Under Secretary for Arms Control and International Security Affairs (2009–2012), member of the U.S. House of Representatives (1997–2009), complications from pneumonia.
- John Trevett, 76, English cricketer.
- James D. Wright, 71, American sociologist.
- Werner Zimmer, 89, German Olympic wrestler.

=== 30 ===
- Anémone, 68, French actress (Santa Claus Is a Stinker, The Grand Highway), César winner (1988), lung cancer.
- Silvina Bosco, 52, Argentine actress, cancer.
- Beth Carvalho, 72, Brazilian samba singer (Estação Primeira de Mangueira).
- Chuck Cecil, 96, American broadcaster.
- Luis del Cerro, 94, Spanish Olympic sport shooter.
- Luciano Comaschi, 87, Italian football player (Brescia, Napoli) and manager.
- Mike Doyle, 78, American surfer.
- Dunaden, 13, French racehorse, Melbourne Cup winner (2011), complications of a paddock accident.
- Max Evans, 88, Australian politician.
- Ahmed Fagih, 76, Libyan writer.
- Russ Gibb, 87, American music promoter (MC5, Ted Nugent, Iggy Pop), heart failure.
- Fitzroy Gordon, 65, Jamaican-born Canadian radio broadcaster (CKFG-FM).
- Boon Gould, 64, English musician (Level 42).
- Robert J. T. Joy, 90, American colonel and physician.
- Nurit Karlin, 80, Israeli cartoonist.
- Art Kunkin, 91, American journalist.
- Luis Maldonado Venegas, 62, Mexican politician, Deputy (2015–2018).
- Peter Mayhew, 74, English-American actor (Star Wars), heart attack.
- S. P. Y. Reddy, 68, Indian politician, MP (since 2004), lung infection.
- Robert R. Spitzer, 96, American agricultural researcher and educator.
- Joseph D. Stewart, 77, American military officer, melanoma.
- Erika Strasser, 85, Austrian Olympic javelin thrower.
