= Ann Lewis (disambiguation) =

Ann Lewis (born 1937), is American political advisor.

Ann or Anne Lewis may also refer to:

== In arts and media ==
- Ann Lewis (musician) (born 1956), Japanese singer
- Ann Lewis (artist), multidisciplinary activist artist
- Ann Lewis Hamilton, American television producer and writer
- Annie Lewis (c. 1869–1896), American soubrette of light operas and musical comedies
- Anne Lewis (writer), see Tir na n-Og Award
- Anne Lewis Johnson from POV

== Others ==
- Ann Lewis (barrel racer), world champion barrel racer
- Ann Clwyd (born 1937), née Lewis, politician
- Anna Lewis (suffragette) (1889–1976), British suffragette awarded the Hunger Strike Medal
- Anne Lewis (attorney), American attorney
- Anna Lewis (1885–1961), teacher, historian, writer, and Choctaw Nation citizen
- Annie May Alston Lewis (1917–2006), American theological librarian

== Fiction ==
- Anne Lewis, a character in the Robocop franchise portrayed by Nancy Allen

== See also ==
- Lewis (surname)
