= Nanka Serkedzhieva =

Bulgarian military officer

- Born: 22 September 1925; Plovdiv, Bulgaria
- Died: 4 December 2012 (aged 87); Sofia, Bulgaria
- Occupation: Police officer
- Known for: The first woman in Bulgarian ministry of internal affairs

Nanka Serkedzhieva (1925–2012) was a Bulgarian officer who was the second woman in Bulgaria to reach the rank of Major General. During her career in State Security, Nanka received a total of 9 awards, making her one of the most awarded female officers in Bulgaria.

== Life ==
Nanka Dincheva Serkedzhieva was born 22 September 1925 in Plovdiv, Bulgaria. She attended high school in Plovdiv until 1943 when she was discharged after breaking school rules.

She joined the Bulgarian Communist Party in 1944.

In 1945, Serkedzhieva continued her education at Plovdiv University, but only briefly because she decided to drop out due to pregnancy.

In 1950 she joined the Ministry of internal affairs as a police officer and soon had been assigned to the political police. The most prestigious among her medals and awards were "Red Flag" and "Red Star", along with "Hero of Socialist Labour".

Nanka Serkedzhieva died in Sofia on 5 December 2012.

== Military awards ==
- 1953 – Fight Medal
- 1956 – "Red Flag" Communist award
- 1964 – Award "9th of September 1944" 1st degree
- 1967 – Ministry of internal affairs medal 1st degree
- 1969 – Public security & service medal
- 1974 – Award 1st degree – Republic of Bulgaria
- 1975 – Award 1st degree – Republic of Bulgaria
- 1985 – Hero of Socialist Labour award
- 1986 – Award 9 September 1944 1st degree

== Military ranks ==
- 1947 – Militia Lieutenant
- 1951 – State Security Major
- 1956 – State Security Lieutenant Colonel
- 1975– State Security Major General
