= Enrique Álvarez =

Enrique Álvarez may refer to:

- Enrique Álvarez Conde (1952–2019), Spanish academic
- Enrique Álvarez Córdova (1930–1980), assassinated Salvadoran politician and statesman
- Enrique Álvarez del Castillo, Mexican politician, governor of Jalisco (1983–1988)
- Enrique Álvarez Diosdado (1910–1983), Spanish actor
- Enrique Álvarez Félix (1934–1996), Mexican actor

== See also ==
- Enrique Alférez (1901–1999), Mexican-American artist
