= Ronald Lewis =

Ronald or Ron Lewis may refer to:

- Ronald G. Lewis (1941–2019), first Native American to receive a Ph.D. in the field of social work
- Ronald Lewis (actor) (1928–1982), Welsh actor
- Ronald Lewis (British politician) (1909–1990), British politician
- Ronald Lewis (rugby league), rugby league footballer of the 1940s and 1950s
- Ronald Lewis (baritone) (1916–1967), Welsh opera singer
- Ronald F. Lewis (born 1966), United States Army general
- Butch Lewis (Ronald Everett Lewis, 1946–2011), American boxing promoter and manager
- Ron Lewis (basketball) (born 1984), basketball player for the Ohio State University
- Ron Lewis (offensive lineman) (born 1972), American football offensive lineman in the NFL
- Ron Lewis (wide receiver) (born 1968), American football wide receiver in the NFL
- Ron Lewis (born 1946), U.S. Representative from Kentucky
