= Violeta Gindeva =

Bulgarian actress (1946–2019)

- from 1971 film "Daughter-in-Law"
- Born: June 14, 1946; Sliven
- Died: April 21, 2019 (aged 72); Sofia
- Education: Krastyo Sarafov National Academy for Theatre and Film Arts
- Occupations: Actress and politician

Violeta Panayotova Gindeva (Bulgarian: Виолета Гиндева; June 14, 1946 – April 21, 2019) was a Bulgarian actress.

== Life ==
Gindeva was born in Sliven in 1946. She studied drama under professor Zhelcho Mandadzhiev and professor Grisha Ostrovski at the Krastyo Sarafov National Academy for Theatre and Film Arts. She graduated in 1968.

In 1971, she was among leading actors who appeared in the controversial TV film Demonat na imperiyata ("The Demon of the Empire"). The film about national hero Vasil Levski had a daring "western (genre)"western" style story, which was nearly dropped after protests of how it poked fun at the Turkish army.

In the early 1970s Gindeva was fired by Alexander Getman when she refused to have an abortion so she can continue acting at the National Theatre. She later returned to the theatre, but she was fired by Vasil Stefanov in 1993. She said this was because she objected to the policy of retiring older actors. It was her view that actors of any age are always worthy and necessary.

After some difficult times as an actress, she turned to politics, and she was elected as the deputy mayor of Pazardzhik from 2003 to 2007. After about 20 years away from acting, she returned to acting at the Bulgarian National Theatre. She was cast in Rositsa Obreshkova's version of the American comedy play Moon Over Buffalo by Ken Ludwig two years before she died in Sofia in 2019. In 2018 she started teaching at the University of Plovdiv with Michael Botevski as her assistant.

== Films ==
- "Black Angels"
- "The Adventures of Avakum Zakhov"
- "The Daughter in Law", 1971
- "The Demon of the Empire", 1971 (for TV)
- "The Prince", 1970
- "The Wedding of John Assen", 1975
