= The Fat Cat Sat on the Mat =

Book by Nurit Karlin

The Fat Cat Sat on the Mat is a 1996 American children's book authored and illustrated by Nurit Karlin. Published by HarperCollins, the book is an early-reader rhyming story that stresses the ability to read words of specific structure, such as "at". The plot regards a large cat that refuses to get off a mat, despite bribery attempts from a furious rat.
