= Anil Kumar Koneru =

Indian film producer (died 2019)

- Died: 26 April 2019; Hyderabad, India
- Occupation: Film producer

Anil Kumar Koneru (died April 26, 2019) was an Indian film producer who produced many Telugu films.

== Biography ==
Koneru produced Allari Bullodu in 2005. He also produced films like Sriramachandrulu, Ottesi Chepthunna and Radha Gopalam.

Koneru died of cancer in a Hyderabad hospital on 26 April 2019.

== Selected filmography ==
- Sriramachandrulu (2003)
- Ottesi Chepthunna (2003)
- Radha Gopalam (2005)
- Allari Bullodu (2005)
