= Norrie Muir =

Scottish mountain climber and first ascentionist (1948–2019)

Norrie Muir (1948 – 12 April 2019) was a Scottish climber and prolific first ascentionist.

Muir attended Waverley Senior Secondary School in Knightswood from 1961 to 1965, then served his apprenticeship as a ship draughtsman in John Brown's, Clydebank from 1965 to 1970.

He was a member of the exclusive Creagh Dhu mountaineering club, and with Stevie Docherty and George Adam formed a group known as the "Steam Team". He was particularly active during the 1970s and 1980s, when he made over 30 first ascents in Scotland in both summer and winter. He made the first free ascent, and second overall ascent, of King Kong (E2) on Carn Dearg Buttress on Ben Nevis with "Big" Ian Nicholson in June 1970, and two days later the pair climbed Heidbanger (E1). Muir returned seven years later to climb the true start with Arthur Paul, with whom he also did many of his winter routes, including the classic "Silver Tear", a spectacular icefall on Beinn Bhàn in the North-West Highlands. In 1977 the pair contributed four new winter ascents on Ben Nevis, including Minus One Buttress (VI,6) and Rubicon Wall (V,5) via the 1933 Hargreaves Route, and in January 1978 they made the first winter ascent of Psychedelic Wall (VI,5) in challenging weather conditions.

== Bibliography ==
- Jeff Connor, Creagh Dhu Climber (1999) ISBN 0-948153-54-7
- Ken Crocket, Ben Nevis ISBN 0-907521-16-9
