= Nancy Fouts =

American sculptural artist and graphic designer (1945–2019)

Nancy Fouts (born 23 April 1945, Seattle, died 26 April 2019) was a sculptural artist and graphic designer.

In the late 1980s she managed the Fouts and Fowler gallery, with her then husband, designer Malcolm Fowler. Her first solo show as an artist was at Angela Flowers gallery on Lisle Street, Soho, in 1970, and more recently was regularly exhibited at Pertwee, Anderson and Gold, in Soho. In 2018 the Down the Rabbit Hole exhibition at Flowers gallery, Mayfair, coincided with the publication of a monograph.

She regularly showed with the Gervasuti Foundation at the Venice Biennale (2009–17).

== Personal life ==
In 1967, she and Malcolm had founded the Shirt Sleeve advertising studio, which included campaigns for Silk Cut, British Airways, Benson & Hedges and Virgin.

Nancy was the daughter of John and Margaret Fouts. Aged 16 she was sent to a finishing school in Pont Street, Chelsea, called the Three Wise Monkeys. In 1963, marrying Malcolm the year before, she went to Chelsea School of Art to begin a BA in graphic design, then did her master’s at the Royal College of Art. During that time she worked painting shop fronts in Carnaby Street. Following her graduation, Nancy Fouts won many awards, including a D&AD gold award for a campaign for the Post Office (1973). Its best known collaboration was the 1986 Tate Gallery by Tube poster, in which the London Underground map was reproduced in trails of oil paint squeezed from a tube.

The couple opened Fouts and Fowler in 1989, exhibiting their own work and that of other artists until it closed after they divorced in 1995. Thereafter Nancy focused on her own artwork.

Her home and studio was in Camden Town, a former Victorian gothic vicarage, where she lived with her long-term partner, Sophie Jegado.

Nancy was survived by her two grown children Bo & Ben.
