= Jim Whiteside =

American politician (1924–2019)

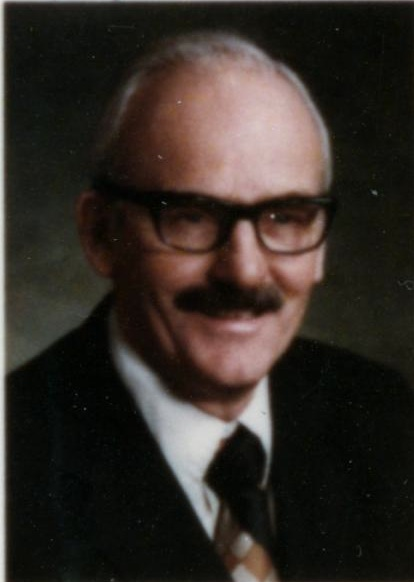
- Whiteside in 1977

Member of the Washington House of Representatives for the 14th district
- In office 1975–1981

Personal details
- Born: April 15, 1924 Yakima, Washington, United States
- Died: April 7, 2019 (aged 94)
- Party: Republican
- Spouse: Shirley
- Occupation: businessman

James Hunter Whiteside (April 15, 1924 – April 7, 2019) was an American politician in the state of Washington. He served the 14th district from 1975 to 1981.
