= Florida Justice Institute =

U.S. nonprofit organization

- Formation: 1978
- Headquarters: Downtown, Miami, Florida
- Executive Director: Michael J. Langley
- Website: fji.law

The Florida Justice Institute (FJI) is a nonprofit public interest law firm in Miami, Florida. It was established in 1978 by Roderick Petry and Randall C. Berg Jr. The institute has been dedicated to improving conditions in Florida's prison system and has initiated numerous class action lawsuits toward this end. Berg is past president of the Florida ACLU. Berg also served on Governor Lawton Chiles' Transition Criminal Justice Task Force and is the past Chairman of the Corrections Committee.

The Florida Justice Institute is led by Executive Director Michael J. Langley and is staffed by attorneys who handle major, systemic civil rights litigation throughout the state of Florida. FJI litigates primarily on behalf of those incarcerated in Florida's prisons and jails. These types of cases include wrongful death, deliberate indifference to serious medical need, unconstitutional conditions of confinement, excessive force, failure to protect, First Amendment (including free speech, censorship, and religious freedom), disability discrimination, and others. FJI also conducts litigation for non-incarcerated victims of housing discrimination, disability discrimination, police misconduct, and engages in various other forms of impact litigation, education, and advocacy for the poor and disenfranchised.

FJI also previously operated the Volunteer Lawyers' Project for the Southern District of Florida, a pro bono project that helps low-income, pro se litigants obtain pro bono attorneys for civil cases. FJI and the Volunteer Lawyers' Project are both housed in office space donated by the law firm of Carlton Fields.

In 2007 the institute settled the Parilla v. Eslinger strip search class action lawsuit. In 2001 the institute collaborated with the Florida ACLU to protect the voting rights of Florida's poor and disenfranchised. In 1996 the institute advocated for Blacks and Hispanics who were being discriminated against in the housing market. In 2000 the institute was instrumental in eliminating Florida's Amendment 2, which would have enshrined the death penalty in the state's Constitution. The Florida Justice Institute regularly collaborates with WriteAPrisoner.com and Prison Legal News to advocate for prisoners' rights.
