= Rusdi Genest =

Canadian sculptor (born 1939)

- Born: 1939; Sherbrooke, Quebec
- Died: 14 April 2019 (aged 79–80)
- Known for: Sculptor
- Notable work: Art integration to architecture

Rusdi Genest RCA (1939 – 14 April 2019) was a Quebec sculptor known for his symbolic surrealistic art bronzes by the lost-wax casting process and his hand-pressed mural reliefs in fine art papermaking. He was inducted into the Royal Canadian Academy of Arts (RCA) in 2013.

== Education and teaching ==
Genest earned an MFA from the Université du Québec à Montréal. He studied art at the École nationale supérieure des Beaux-Arts (ENSBA), the École nationale supérieure des arts appliqués et des métiers d'art (ENSAAMA) in Paris, and the California State University, Long Beach. He was a professor at the Université du Québec à Chicoutimi (UQAC), Saguenay and at the Sadie Bronfman School of fine arts in Montréal. He previously taught courses at the California State College, Sonoma, the Boston and the Cambridge Centers for Adult Education.

Genest was awarded subsidies and research grants by the Quebec Ministry of Culture and Communications.

== Honors and awards ==
In June 2013, Genest was inducted into the Royal Canadian Academy of Arts. He has received awards from the Minister of Interior of the Republic of Italy, Art Credo, Toronto, Canada, the Governor of the Province of Ravenna, Italy. He earned a medal from the Salon des Arts et des Lettres de Paris Sud, France, the Monterey and the Mill Valley Festivals of the Arts, Ca., USA.

== Art integration to architecture ==
- Centre d'accueil Mgr Victor Tremblay (Details), Chicoutimi, Qc
- Centre d'accueil Beaumanoir (Second art), Saguenay, Qc
- Centre d'accueil Cité des Prairies, Montréal, Qc.

== Works in public collections ==
Smithsonian Institution in Washington DC, Museo Dantesco of Ravenna in Italy, State Museum of Berlin, the British Museum of London (Medals), Museum of Wroclaw in Poland, Residence of the " Délégué Général du Québec " in Paris, the Canadian Cultural Center, Paris, Library and Archives Canada, Ottawa, and AMSA in New York.

== Artworks ==
Genest's works have been exhibited in Canada, England, Finland, France, Germany, Hungary, Italy, Japan, Poland, Portugal, United States, Sweden and Switzerland. He designed a medallion for the American Medallic Sculptural Association.

== Summary of solo exhibitions ==
- Montréal, Qc, Can Gallery, Bernard, " So goeth the Cosmos " 2010
- Québec, Qc, Canada, Linda Verge Gallery, " Fugues in folly " 2007
- Montréal, Qc, Galerie Bernard, " Fugues en folie " 2006
- Montréal, Qc, Georges Laoun Gallery at the Museum, " Explosivities & Time stasis " 2002
- Montréal, Qc, Galerie Bernard, " Explosivitées et Temps d'arrêts " 2001
- Québec, Qc, Galerie Linda Verge, " Tissus Civilisations, Textures d'Humanités " 1999
- Spokane, WA, US, Lorrinda Knight Gallery, " Bronze sketches & Paper manuscripts " 1995
- Toronto, Canadian Exchange Tower, " Whimsical Serenades for Strewn Ceremonials " 1994
- Montréal, Can, John Abbott Gallery, " Rusdi Genest, Bronze, Stoneware & Paper art " 1992
- Chicoutimi, Qc, Art Society's Virtual Space, " Affichages Sculpturaux, Clameurs et Visions " 1982
- Montréal, Qc, University of Québec Gallery, " Affichages Sculpturaux, Clameurs et Visions " 1981
- Montréal, Qc, Galerie d'art Les deux B, " Proximiser un devenir par passages intensifs " 1979
- Montréal, Qc, Galerie Saint-Denis, " Mites et Mythes, bronzes cires perdues, dessins récents " 1978
- Montréal, Qc, Galerie Balcon des Images, " L'univers ésotérique féminin " 1977
- Paris, France, Canadian student residence, Cité universitaire, " Stylized feminin forms " 1972
- Monterey, California, USA, Matrix Gallery, " Magical sketches in bronze " 1970
- Carmel, California, USA, Tantamount Art Theatre, " Magical sketches in bronze " 1969
- Hollywood, Ca., USA, Pan American Cultural Society, " Opera del sculptor Genesto " 1967
- Beverly Hills, California, USA, Setay Gallery, " Lost wax cast bronze sculptures " 1966

== Bibliography ==
- Bernard Michel, " Rusdi Genest: Calendrier de la vie artistique », (ISBN 2-9807711-3-9) 2006
- Andre Seleanu, " Rusdi Genest: Master of Narrative », The Medal # 42, Spring 2003, p. 32
- Andre Seleanu, " Les engrenages allégoriques Rusdi Genest ", Vie des Arts, No. 183, été 01, p. 53
- Andre Seleanu, " À faire, une œuvre de Rusdi Genest ", Espace Sculpture, Vol.5, # 2, hiver 1989, p. 22
