= Matoug Adam =

Libyan politician (1926–2019)

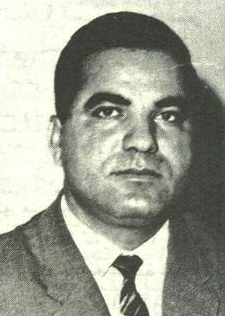
Adam in 1968

Matoug Adam (Arabic: معتوق آدم الرقعي; 1926 – 2 April 2019) was a Libyan politician, civil servant and poet. He served as the Libyan minister of tourism from January 1968 to June 1969. He then served as the last interior minister of the Kingdom of Libya from June 1969 to 31 August 1969, when the royal government was overthrown by Muammar Gaddafi.

In June 1969, Adam was appointed Interior Minister of Libya. He held the office until 31 August 1969, when the royal government was overthrown during the 1969 Libyan coup d'état led by Muammar Gaddafi. Adam was arrested and imprisoned in September 1969 by the Gaddafi government. He spent two years in prison before his release.

Adam died on 2 April 2019, at the age of 93.
