= Don Melnick =

Don J. Melnick (June 2, 1953 – April 18, 2019) was an environmental biologist and conservationist. He held the position of Thomas Hunt Morgan Professor of Conservation Biology at Columbia University, where he was also professor of anthropology and biological sciences.

He served as the founding Executive Director of the Center for Environmental Research and Conservation (CERC), a consortium of organizations including Columbia, the American Museum of Natural History, the New York Botanical Garden, the Wildlife Conservation Society, and the EcoHealth Alliance. He also served as co-chair of the United Nations Millennium Task Force on Environmental Sustainability, charged with reporting on the Millennium Development Goals for global environmental sustainability to the Secretary General.

Melnick received his Ph.D. in Physical Anthropology from Yale in 1981, and became one of Columbia's youngest tenured faculty members, as well as the youngest person ever to serve as chair of Columbia's Anthropology Department. For six years (1988-1994), he lived in one of Columbia's undergraduate dormitories as faculty-in-residence. He died at the age of 65 in 2019.
