= Thomas Vietorisz =

Hungarian-born American economist (1926–2019)

- Born: February 4, 1926; Budapest, Hungary
- Died: April 5, 2019 (aged 93); New Canaan, Connecticut, U.S.
- Education: MIT
- Occupation: Economist

Thomas Adam Vietorisz (February 4, 1926 – April 5, 2019) was a Hungarian-born American economist who specialized in urban planning.

== Education ==
Vietorisz completed his undergraduate studies at Budapest, Basel, and Zurich. In 1948, he received a Master of Science degree in Chemical Engineering and in 1956, a doctorate degree in economics from the Massachusetts Institute of Technology (MIT).

== Career ==
=== Teaching ===
From 1963 to 1995, Vietorisz worked in the graduate faculty of The New School for Social Research in New York City. He held the position of department chair in 1977; senior lecturer from 1990 to 1994 and Professor Emeritus from 1995. From 1996, he was an adjunct Professor at Columbia University. Vietorisz also worked as an adjunct professor at Cornell University, Ithaca, New York from 1970 to 1973 and from 1977 onwards.

=== Economics ===
Vietorisz worked in the field of applied and theoretical economics. An early example of his theoretical contribution is his method to quantize for priority ordering of projects in planning. Another example is his theory of "Decentralization in NonConvex System" that was highlighted in Econometrica. The aim was to represent a two-level planning and decision-making system within the traditional Edgeworth box diagram, but extended for non-convex analysis.

An example of a practical suggestion Vietorisz makes is discussed in his challenge of the substitution-based theory for setting the US minimum wage which came under discussion in the forum of the journal Challenge. In that forum, McCulloch raised the question as to where the other factors of production will come from to support an increase in the minimum wage. Vietorisz proposed that there were historic precedents to show that government-assisted loans were a possible source, and that in the case of the agricultural sector, there was no shortage of land since some was being taken out of cultivation through subsidy programs. In short, McCulloch argued from the neoclassical perspective; Vietorisz, from the Dual Labor Market and Moral perspectives. The two different paradigms to view the issue of minimum wage are still being reconciled in the literature.

== Death ==
Thomas Vietorisz died in New Canaan, Connecticut on April 5, 2019, at the age of 93.

== Selected papers ==
- "Planning and Political Economy" in Social Research 1983, Summer 50:2 p. 469 - 484.
- "Epilogue: The Hieroglyph of Production" in Nell E. A. (Ed.) Growth, Profits, and Property Cambridge University Press, New York, 1980, p. 303 - 304.
- "Economic Policy Design: Principles and Urban Applications" in Eastern Economic Journal 1974, January 1:1.
- "We Need a $3.50 Minimum Wage" in Challenge 1973 May - June p. 49 - 62.
- "Quantized Preferences and Planning by Priorities" in American Economic Review May, 1970.
- "Decentralization and Project Evaluation under Economies of Scale and Indivisibilities" in Industrialization and Productivity New York, 1968, United Nations, Bulletin 12, p. 25 - 58.
- "Locational Choices in Planning" in Millikan M. (Ed.) National Economic Planning, New York, National Bureau of Economic Research and Columbia University Press 1967 p. 69 - 128.
- "Pre-Investment Data Summary for the Chemical Industry" in Industrialization and Productivity, New York, 1966. United Nations, Bulletin 10 p. 7 - 56.
- "Industrial Development Planning Models with Economies of Scale and Indivisibilities" in Regional Science Association Papers and Proceedings 1964 vol. 12 p. 157 - 192.
- "Preliminary Bibliography for Industrial Development Programming, Chemical and Related Industries" in Industrialization and Productivity, New York, 1963 United Nations bulletin 6 p. 67 - 77.
- "The Potential of the Computer and High-Speed Information Processing Techniques for Industrial Development" in Science, Technology and Development U.S. Government Printing Office, Washington DC 1963, vol. 4 p. 103 - 117.
- "Preliminary Bibliography for Industrial Development Programming, Part I: Industries in General" in Industrialization and Productivity, New York, 1962. United Nations bulletin 5 p. 68 - 82.
