= Henry Rice Guild =

American lawyer (1928–2019)

Henry Rice Guild (October 22, 1928 – April 22, 2019) was an American lawyer and director of the Pioneer Fund (1948–1974).

According to the Pioneer Fund biography, he was a lieutenant in the United States Navy in World War I. He graduated Harvard College and Harvard Law School. He practiced at Herrick Smith, Boston.

Guild was a trustee of Massachusetts General Hospital, a director Audubon Society, chair of the Greater Boston Community Fund, and chair of the Massachusetts Department of Public Welfare.
