= Zheng Guo'en =

Chinese film theorist, cinematographer, director, and educator (1930–2019)

- Born: January 1930
- Died: 18 April 2019 (aged 89)

Academic work
- Discipline: film
- Institutions: Beijing Film Academy

Zheng Guo'en (Chinese: 郑国恩; January 1930 – 18 April 2019) was a Chinese film theorist, cinematographer, director, and educator. A longtime professor at Beijing Film Academy, he trained many prominent Chinese filmmakers including Zhang Yimou. He received the Lifetime Achievement Award at the 27th Golden Rooster and Hundred Flowers Film Festival in 2018.

== Biography ==
Zheng was born in January 1930 in Anda, Heilongjiang, China. He entered the Northeast Film Studio as a trainee in 1948 and worked as a cinematographer at the studio after completing his training. He entered Northeast Normal University in 1951 and graduated three years later with a degree in Russian language.

From 1954 to 1956, he worked and trained at Mosfilm in the Soviet Union. After returning to China in 1956, he began teaching at Beijing Film Academy. From 1962 to 1964, he spent another two years in the Soviet Union to further his studies at the All-Union State Institute of Cinematography.

After the disruptions of the Cultural Revolution, Zheng served as deputy chair and later chair (after 1984) of the Department of Cinematography of Beijing Film Academy. His students included Zhang Yimou, Gu Changwei, Hou Yong, Wang Xiaolie, and Zhang Huijun.

In 1999, Zheng went to Chengdu and helped establish the cinematography department at Sichuan Film and Television University. He was named an honorary professor at the university.

Zheng co-directed the film At the Foot of the Icy Mountain (1984) and was the cinematographer for A Girl's Tomb (1982) and Red Waves in the Blue Sea (1975), among others.

In November 2018, he received the Lifetime Achievement Award at the 27th Golden Rooster and Hundred Flowers Film Festival (中国金鸡百花电影节).

Zheng died on 18 April 2019 in Beijing, at the age of 89.
