= Rovshan Almuradly =

Azerbaijani film director, screenwriter, and actor (1954–2019)

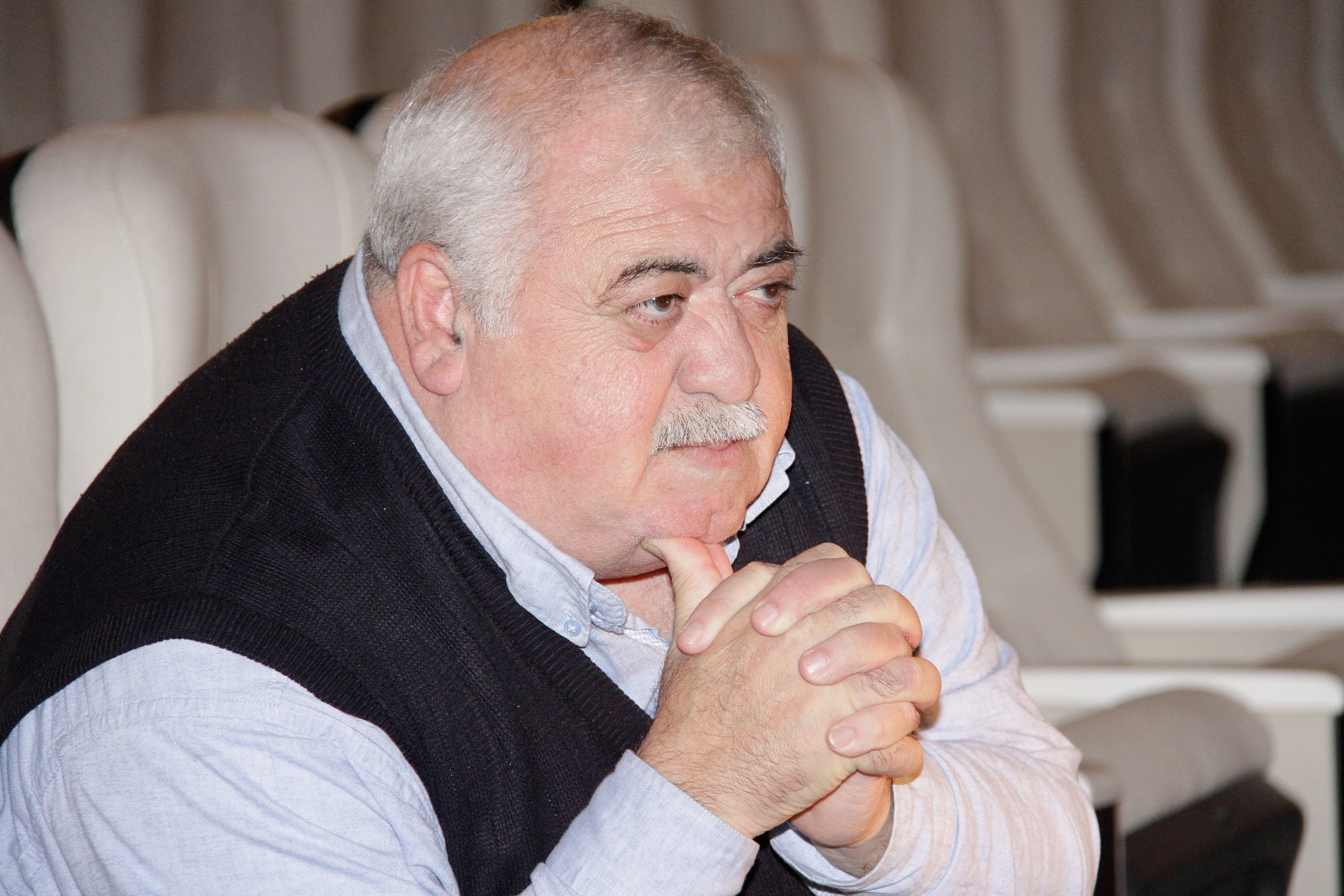
- Born: 19 April 1954; Baku, Azerbaijan
- Died: 2 April 2019 (aged 64); Sumqayit, Azerbaijan
- Occupations: Film director, screenwriter and actor

Rovshan Almuradly (19 April 1954 – 2 April 2019) was an Azerbaijani film director, screenwriter and actor.

== Biography ==
In 1976, he graduated at the Azerbaijan State Institute of Arts named after MA Aliev, after which he served as an actor in the theaters of the Azerbaijan SSR.

In 1987 he graduated from the Institute of Advanced Studies at the Ministry of Culture of the USSR (Moscow) with a degree in drama direction.

In 1987-1988 he was director of the Sumgait Theater. G. Arablinsky, while in 1988-1990 he was Chief director of the Mingechaur Theater. M. Davidova. In 1990–2003 he worked as a director of AZ.TV, Azerbaijan Telefilm. Since 2005 he was the director of the Academic National Theater of Azerbaijan (Baku). He died of heart attack on 2 April 2019.
