= Ricardo Chibanga =

Mozambican bullfighter (1942–2019)

Personal information
- Born: 8 November 1942
- Died: 16 April 2019 (aged 76)

Sport
- Sport: Bullfighting
- Rank: Matador

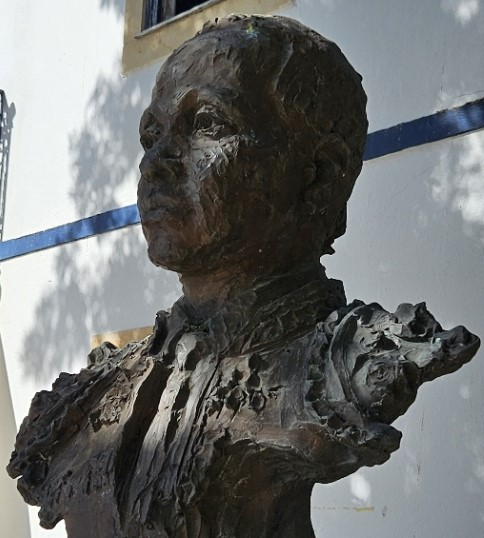
Bust of Ricardo Chibanga, Golegã, 2020

Ricardo Chibanga (8 November 1942 – 16 April 2019) was a Mozambican bullfighter and the first Bantu African bullfighter.

Chibanga was one of seven children of a pastry shop owner in Lourenço Marques, Mozambique. He began frequenting a local bullring at age nine, and became involved in promoting bullfighting to tourists. In 1960 he accepted an invitation to a bullfighting festival in Lisbon; after observing fights by Diamantino Viseu and Manuel dos Santos], he decided to stay, and was hired to care for fighting bulls. He began performing as a bullfighter by 1968, as a member of the entourage of Armando Soarez. He made his matador debut in 1971 in Seville, becoming the "first of African descent to perform professionally in the sport".

As a matador Chibanga was noted for his colourful costumes and dancing. He toured around the world and his audience included Orson Welles, Salvador Dalí, and Pablo Picasso. After his retirement in 1999 he owned a bullring in Golegã, Portugal, where he died in 2019.
