= Randall C. Berg Jr. =

American attorney (1949–2019)

Randall Challen Berg Jr.
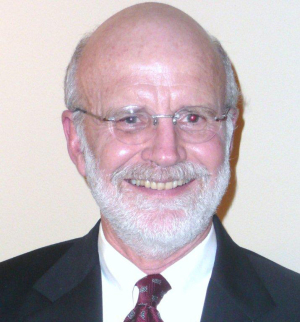
- Born: January 17, 1949
- Died: April 10, 2019 (aged 70)
- Occupation: Lawyer
- Known for: Executive Director of the Florida Justice Institute

Randall Challen Berg Jr. (January 17, 1949 – April 10, 2019) was an American attorney.

== Biography ==
Berg was born to Randall Challen Berg and Margaret Baker Berg. He spent most of his childhood in Jacksonville, Florida, graduating from Robert E. Lee High School in 1967. He attended the University of North Carolina at Chapel Hill, graduating in 1971 with a bachelor's degree in political science with a minor in English. He served three years in the U.S. Navy, stationed out of Treasure Island, California, achieving the rank of lieutenant junior grade. Berg attended George Mason University School of Law, graduating in 1978. He married his wife Carol in 1978 and then moved to Miami to start the Florida Justice Institute (FJI). He had a son, Randall Challen Berg III, who was born in 1987.

Berg was the executive director of the Florida Justice Institute, a public interest law firm in Miami which he established in 1978. He has conducted and been involved in numerous individual and class action lawsuits that strive to improve conditions in Florida's prison and jails. He was chairman of the Corrections Committee of The Florida Bar, and president of the ACLU of Florida. He served on Florida Governor Chiles' Transition Criminal Justice Task Force, and several legislative committees dealing with criminal justice and corrections issues. He has been an adjunct professor of law at the University of Miami School of Law, and directs the Volunteer Lawyers' Project for the U.S. District Court for Florida's Southern District. He worked to develop the United States' first Interest on Lawyers’ Trust Account (IOLTA) program in Florida, and then assisted in establishing IOLTA programs nationwide and defending its constitutionality as the executive director of the National IOLTA Clearinghouse. IOLTA has created over $5 billion nationwide to primarily fund legal services for the poor

In November 2018, he and FJI were named to the Daily Business Review's 2018 Most Effective Lawyers list for their public interest work in securing treatment for prisoners infected with hepatitis C.

Berg retired at the end of 2018, two years after initially being diagnosed with ALS. He was proud of the 40 years of work fighting "for the rights of the downtrodden, disabled, disenfranchised and even the despised."

On April 10, 2019, the Florida Justice Institute announced that Berg had died from complications of ALS.

On June 8, 2023, Jacksonville University established the Randall C. Berg Jr. College of Law Deanship. This endowed deanship was given in honor of Randall by his brother Gilchrist Berg.
