= Claud Walker =

American politician (1934–2019)

Claud LaDale Walker (May 11, 1934 – April 20, 2019) was an American politician.

Claud Walker was one of thirteen children born to parents Leilus and Ruby of Pell City, Alabama. He met Louise Thompson in Mobile, whom he married, and later moved to Montgomery. Walker worked for the Saladmaster Corporation, was a Baptist minister, and served in the Alabama House of Representatives from 1986 to 1994.
