= Sriramachandrulu =

- DVD Cover
- Directed by: Srikanth I
- Screenplay by: Srikanth I
- Story by: Janardhan Maharshi
- Produced by: Srikanth I Anil Kumar Koneru
- Starring: Rajendra Prasad; Sivaji; Rambha; Raasi; Sindhu Menon; Brahmanandam; Kovai Sarala
- Cinematography: Srinivas Paidala
- Edited by: Mohan-Rama Rao
- Music by: Ghantadi Krishna
- Production company: Sindhura Creations
- Release date: 7 November 2003
- Running time: 155 minutes
- Country: India
- Language: Telugu

Sriramachandrulu is a 2003 Indian Telugu-language comedy film produced by Srikanth I and Anil Kumar Koneru and directed by Srikankh I. Starring Rajendra Prasad, Sivaji, Rambha, Raasi, Sindhu Menon, Brahmanandam and Kovai Sarala, with music composed by Ghantadi Krishna. The film was a hit at the box office. This was Rambha's final Telugu film to date as a leading actress.

== Cast ==
- Rajendra Prasad as Sriram
- Sivaji as Chandram
- Rambha as Sundari Devi
- Raasi as Sailaja
- Sindhu Menon as Pallavi
- Brahmanandam as Rambabu
- Kovai Sarala as Savitri
- M. S. Narayana as Driver
- Venu Madhav as Perfect Paramkusam
- Mallikarjuna Rao as Inspector
- Raghu Babu
- Krishna Bhagawan as Sundari's Secretary
- Kondavalasa as Nithin
- Shakeela as Srikanya
- Gundu Hanumantha Rao
- Gowtham Raju
- Ramjagan
- Jenny

== Soundtrack ==
Sriramachandrulu

Film score by Gantadi Krishna
- Released: 15 October 2003
- Recorded: 2003
- Genre: Soundtrack
- Length: 26:26
- Label: Supreme Music
- Producer: Ghantadi Krishna

Music was composed by Ghantadi Krishna and released by Supreme Music Company. The audio launch took place at Taj Banjara on 15 October 2003 with Srikanth, Kiran Rathod and Tammareddy Bharadwaja as the chief guests.

| No. | Title | Lyrics | Singer(s) | Length |
|---|---|---|---|---|
| 1. | "Palavellila" | Taidala Bapu | Hariharan, Sadhana Sargam | 5:02 |
| 2. | "Jabili Lekapote" | Bompem Jayasurya | Udit Narayan, Nithya Santoshini | 4:59 |
| 3. | "Sogasari Jana" | Maddela Shivakumar | Kumar Sanu, Sridevi | 5:04 |
| 4. | "Pellamante Kaadoi" | Sahithi | Nishma, Sridevi | 3:55 |
| 5. | "Di Di Dikki" | Taidala Bapu | KK, Sunitha Sarathy | 4:07 |
| 6. | "Pellam Mata Vinte" | Sahiti | Ghantadi Krishna, Srinivas, Ramakrishna, Ravikumar | 3:06 |
| Total length: | | | | 26:26 |
