= Tom Leehane =

Australian rules footballer (1928–2019)

Personal information
- Full name: Thomas James Leehane
- Born: 14 February 1928
- Died: 11 April 2019 (aged 91)
- Original teams: East Brunswick YCW / North Melbourne CBC
- Height: 180 cm (5 ft 11 in)
- Weight: 83 kg (183 lb)
- Position: Defender

Playing career^{1}
Years	Club	Games (Goals)
1948–1949	Carlton	1 (0)
1950–1951	Essendon	7 (0)
Total		8 (0)
- ^{1} Playing statistics correct to the end of 1951.

Thomas James Leehane (14 February 1928 – 11 April 2019) was an Australian rules footballer who played with Carlton and Essendon in the Victorian Football League (VFL).

Leehane started out at Carlton in 1945, playing for the thirds. He only played one senior game for them, in the 1948 VFL season. After not featuring in the 1949 season, Leehane crossed to Essendon and appeared in four games in 1950 and another three in 1951.

In 1952, Leehane played with Port Melbourne and was member of their 1953 premiership team. The following year he captain-coached Boort to a premiership and would also coach St Arnaud to a premiership in 1958.
