= Xia Suisheng =

Chinese surgeon (1924–2019)

- 夏穗生
- Born: April 19, 1924; Yuyao, Zhejiang, China
- Died: April 16, 2019 (aged 94)
- Education: Tongji Medical College; Huazhong University of Science and Technology
- Occupation: Surgeon
- Known for: Organ transplant pioneer

Xia Suisheng (Chinese: 夏穗生; 19 April 1924 – 16 April 2019) was a Chinese surgeon and pioneer in organ transplantation.

== Biography ==
Xia was born in April 1924 in Yuyao, Zhejiang, China. He attended high school in Shanghai, and studied at Tongji Medical College, which moved from Shanghai to Wuhan in the early 1950s. After graduation, he became a surgeon at Tongji Hospital in Wuhan.

In 1963, American surgeon Thomas Starzl performed the world's first human liver transplantation, but the core techniques were not disclosed. In 1972, Xia began experimenting with liver transplantation on dogs. He and his colleagues spent five years performing 130 dog liver transplants.

On 30 December 1977, Xia performed a successful human liver transplant on a woman with late-stage liver cancer. Soon after, he performed a liver transplant on a male patient, who survived for a then-record 264 days.

He later researched transplantation of other organs. He successfully performed China's first pancreas transplantation in 1984, China's first spleen transplantation in 1989, and Asia's first successful multiple abdominal organ transplantation in 1995.

Xia established China's first organ transplant research institute at Tongji Hospital. He educated 44 doctoral students, 24 master's students, and 1 postdoctoral researcher.

Xia died on 16 April 2019, three days before his 95th birthday. He donated his corneas as well as 1 million yuan to Tongji Hospital for medical research.
