= Michael Lavery =

Northern Irish barrister (died 2019)

Charles Michael Lavery QC
- Born: June 10, 1934
- Died: April 25, 2019
- Occupation: Barrister

Charles Michael Lavery QC (died April 2019) was a Northern Irish barrister who was active in the Bloody Sunday Inquiry.

Lavery was born on June 10, 1934, in Portadown, County Armagh, Northern Ireland. He pursued his higher education at Trinity College, Dublin, where he obtained his Bachelor of Laws (LLB) degree. He later earned a Master of Laws (LLM) degree from Queen’s University, Belfast.

In recognition of his contributions to the legal field, Lavery was appointed as a Queen's Counsel in 1971, denoted by the initials "QC" after his name.
