= Stephen O. Saxe =

Stephen O. Saxe (1930 – April 28, 2019, in White Plains) was an American graphic designer and historian of printing.

The son of Leonard Spier Saxe, a relative and attorney for Ira Gershwin, and his wife Helen, he studied at Harvard College and Yale Drama School before becoming a theatre and television set designer and then a book designer and artist for Harcourt Brace. His wife was Patricia Singleton Saxe.

A historian and writer on the history of printing, he was a co-founder of the American Printing History Association. After his death, his printing history collection was donated by his estate to the Rochester Institute of Technology and his theatre collection to Yale Drama School.
