= Eckhard Mannischeff =

German fencer (1943–2019)

Personal information
- Born: 30 August 1943 Wismar, Mecklenburg, Germany
- Died: 24 April 2019 (aged 75)

Sport
- Sport: Fencing

Eckhard Mannischeff (30 August 1943 – 24 April 2019) was a German fencer. He competed for East Germany in the team épée event at the 1972 Summer Olympics.
