= Alberto Giovannini =

Italian macroeconomist and financial economist (1955–2019)

Dr. Alberto Giovannini
- Born: 1955; Bologna, Italy
- Died: April 25, 2019; Ferrara, Italy
- Spouse: Patrizia Cavazzini

Academic background
- Education: Massachusetts Institute of Technology University of Bologna
- Doctoral advisor: Rudiger W. Dornbusch

Academic work
- Discipline: Macroeconomics, Financial economics

Alberto Giovannini (1955 – 25 April 2019) was an Italian Macroeconomist and Financial Economist. His career spanned roles in academia, public and private organizations, and his contributions to monetary policy and financial market infrastructure in the European Union (EU) were particularly notable. He died on 25 April 2019.

== Education ==
Giovannini graduated in economics from the University of Bologna. He obtained his Ph.D. in economics from Massachusetts Institute of Technology in 1984.

== Career ==
Giovannini taught finance and economics at Columbia Business School, and was also a fellow of the National Bureau of Economic Research (NBER) and of the Centre for Economic Policy Research (CEPR). In 1995 he joined Long-Term Capital Management as senior advisor and strategist. He served as Programme Director at CEPR. One of the earliest CEPR Research Fellow appointees, he authored 17 CEPR Discussion Papers in the period 1986–2010, on various topics in international macroeconomics and financial markets. He also collaborated on 6 CEPR Reports in the period 1989–2009. The reports reflected on monetary policies, and were influential, particularly the ones on the financial integration of and the monetary policy directions in Europe.

Giovannini was called in 1993 to head the International Debt Office at the Italian Treasury by Mario Draghi who was then general director of the Treasury. He was instrumental in Italy's return to the international issuers' market with a successful debt issue. He served as chair of the Group on Cross-border Clearing and Settlement Arrangements in the EU, formed in 1996 by the European Commission. He was also a Member of the Advisory Scientific Committee for the European Systemic Risk Board when it was created in 2011.

Giovannini published a book, The Debate on Money in Europe in 1994, foreshadowing the adoption of a common currency, the Euro across Europe.

Giovannini has also advised the International Monetary Fund (IMF) and the World Bank, besides being a member of a number of company boards, including the Italian energy company ENEL and the European bond trading platform MTS. He was an independent director of the board of Salini Impregilo from 2012 until 2015 when he was appointed chairman of the board.

== Personal life ==
Giovannini was an avid mountain climber. He considered his scaling of the Tofana di Rozes south wall, along the Alvera-Pompanin route as his best achievement as a climber.

His wife Patrizia Cavazzini is an art historian. He left behind 3 children, Tommaso, Federico and Camilla.

== Bibliography ==
- Jul 2010: Central Banks and the Financial System (with Francesco Giavazzi)
- Nov 2008: Why the European Securities Market is Not Fully Integrated
- Aug 1993: International Evidence on Tradables and Nontradable Inflation
- Mar 1993: The Determinants of Realignment Expectations Under the EMS - Some Empirical Regularities (with Zhaohui Chen)
- Dec 1992: Currency Substitution (with Bart Turtelboom); abstract
- Feb 1992: Bretton Woods and Its Precursors - Rules Versus Discretion in the History of International Monetary Regimes; abstract
- Jan 1992: Estimating Expected Exchange Rates Under Target Zones (with Zhaohui Chen)
- Nov 1991: The Currency Reform as the Last Stage of Economic and Monetary Union - Some Policy Questions
- Oct 1991: Monetary Policy in the Open Economy (with Rudiger Dornbusch)
