= J. Michael Yates =

Canadian author (1938–2019)

- Born: Joel Michael Yates; April 10, 1938; Fulton, Missouri, U.S.
- Died: April 15, 2019 (aged 81); Vancouver, Canada
- Education: University of Missouri; University of Michigan
- Occupations: Corrections officer playwright
- Writing career
- Genres: Fiction; Poetry
- Website: www.jmichaelyates.com/index.php

Joel Michael Yates (April 10, 1938 – April 15, 2019), known as J. Michael Yates, was a Canadian poet, dramatist, fiction writer, and corrections officer.

== Early life and career ==
Yates was born in Fulton, Missouri and raised in Germany. He did graduate degrees at the Universities of Missouri and Michigan, and received an honorary doctorate from Ohio University. Yates emigrated to Vancouver, British Columbia in 1966.

Yates was a widely published author of poetry, fiction, drama, translations, and philosophical essays. He edited several anthologies and founded and edited several literary magazines. His work has been translated into most of the western languages and several of the eastern ones and his drama for radio, television, and stage have been produced both nationally and internationally. His last rank as a university professor was Distinguished Professor.

He won many literary prizes including the Major Hopwood Awards (both poetry and drama the same year) and the Lifetime Achievement Award in the Arts and Sciences from University of Missouri, The Look of Books (for Volvox: Poetry from the Unofficial Languages of Canada in English Translation), The Olympic Arts Award for Schedules of Silence.

He was also a logger, a powder monkey, a motorcycle racer, a broadcasting executive, a broadcaster, an advertising executive, a print salesman, a commercial photographer, a publisher. He retired after seventeen years as a Maximum Security Prison Guard and SWAT team member, and taught languages, history of ideas, and science with his wife in their home in Vancouver.

== Death ==
Yates died on April 15, 2019, at his home in Vancouver. He was survived by his wife and two stepsons.

== Bibliography ==
=== Poetry ===
- Spiral of Mirrors - 1967
- Hunt in an Unmapped Interior - 1967
- Cantacle for Electronic Music - 1967
- Parallax - 1971
- The Great Bear Lake Meditations - 1971 ISBN 0-88750-028-5
- Nothing Speaks for the Blue Moraines - 1973
- Breath of the Snow Leopard - 1974
- The Qualicum Physics - 1975
- Esox Nobilior Non Esox Lucius - 1978
- Fugue Brancusi - 1983
- Insel: The Queen Charlotte Islands Meditations - 1983
- Various Northern Meditations - 1984
- The Completely Collapsible Portable Man - 1984
- Schedules of Silence - 1986 ISBN 0-88978-188-5
- During - 1999
- Hongyun: New and Collected Shorter Poems 1955-2005 - 2005 ISBN 1-4208-2771-5

=== Fiction ===
- Man in the Glass Octopus - 1968
- Fazes in Elsewhen - 1976
- Torque - 1988 ISBN 0-88978-191-5
- Torpor: Collected Fiction, 1960-1987 - 1989 ISBN 0-921870-00-0

=== Fiction and drama ===
- The Abstract Beast - 1971

=== Drama ===
- Night Freight - 1975

=== Non-fiction ===
- Line Screw: Memoir of a Prison Guard - 1994

=== Anthologies ===
- Light Like a Summons - 1990

== Awards ==
- International Broadcasting Award, 1960 and 1961
- Major Hopwood Award for Poetry and Drama from the University of Michigan, 1964
- Look of Books Award, 1972
- Lifetime Achievement Award in the Arts and Sciences from the University of Missouri
- The Writer's Choice Award, 1988
- The Vancouver Award for Line Screw [1994]
