= Galina Kmit =

Soviet and Russian photographer (1921–2019)

- Born: Galina Vasilievna Radysh; 16 December 1921; Odessa, USSR
- Died: 20 April 2019 (aged 97); Moscow, Russia
- Known for: Photography
- Movement: soviet art, photojournalism

Galina Vasilievna Kmit (Russian: Галина Васильевна Кмит; 16 December 1921 – 20 April 2019) was a Soviet and Russian photographer, photo artist, photo correspondent. Honored Art worker of the Russian Federation.

== Biography ==
Galina was born in Odessa in the family of Ukrainian writer Vasyl Radysh.

For many years she worked in the APN / RIA Novosti. She was a member of the Union of Cinematographers and Journalists of Russia, an academician, a member of the Russian-Italian Research Academy Ferroni, a corresponding member of the National Academy of Cinematic Arts and Sciences. Yuri Luzhkov, Oleg Tabakov, Vyacheslav Tikhonov, Stanislav Govorukhin, Elena Yakovleva, Nikita Mikhalkov and many others became the heroes of her photographs.

Her husband was Leonid Kmit, a Soviet theater and film actor, People’s Artist of the RSFSR. From this marriage, the daughter Irina (born 1948) is a screenwriter, actress, novelist, and journalist.

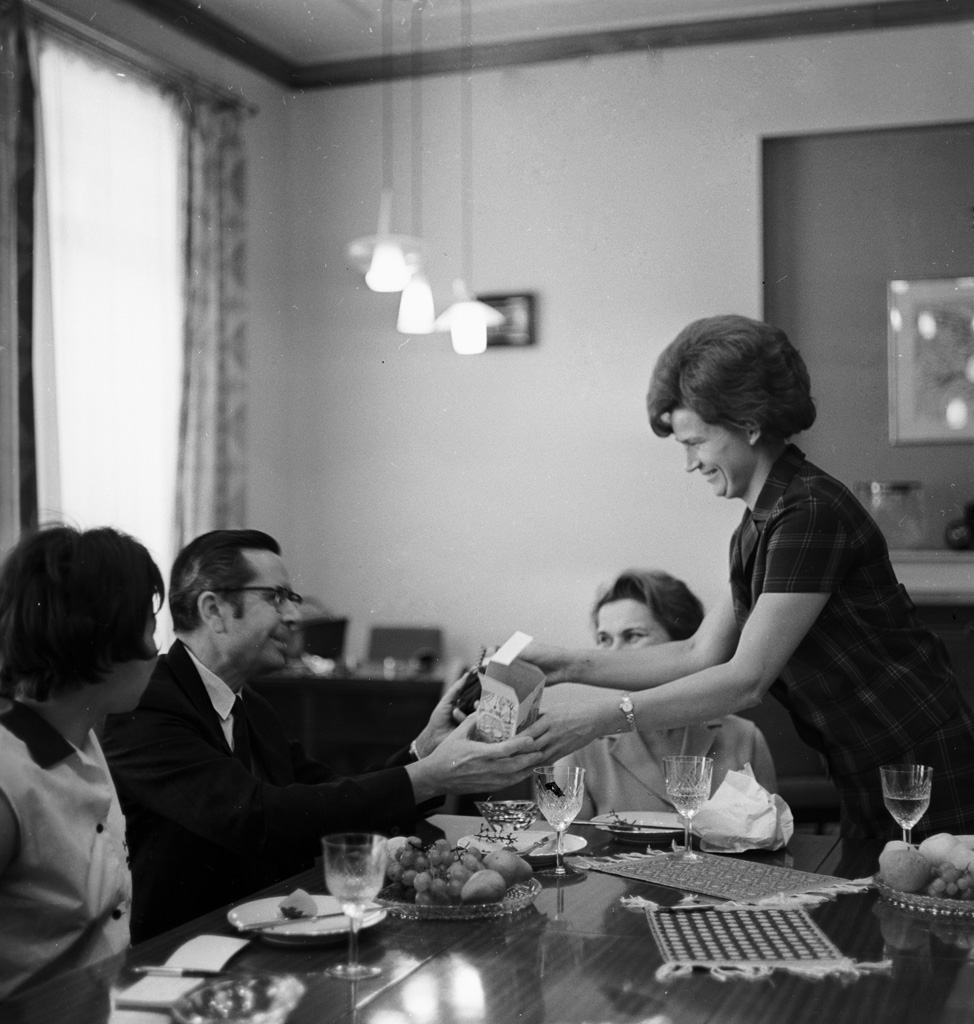
Valentina Tereshkova giving present to Mr. Camp. Photographed by Galina Kmit
