= Roland Andrew Sweet =

American mathematician and computer scientist (1940–2019)

Roland Andrew Sweet (March 14, 1940, in St. Petersburg, Florida – April 15, 2019) was an American mathematician and computer scientist.

He is known for his software contributions exploiting computer vectorization on Cray super computers including CRAYFISHPAK, multigrid solvers for elliptic problems, vectorized versions of the fast Fourier transforms, parallelized versions of the cyclic reduction algorithm, preconditioned conjugate gradient methods and numerous others.

== Research and career ==
He was a son of Fred and Blanche (Aubin) Sweet. After graduating from St. Petersburg High School in 1958, he served for two years in the U.S. Navy. He studied at St. Petersburg Junior College and then obtained a BS in Mathematics from Florida State University in 1963. He obtained Ph.D. from the Computer Science department at Purdue University in 1967, supervised by John Stanley Maybee, and he joined the Computer Science Department at Cornell University in 1967 as an associate professor. He joined the University of Colorado's Mathematics Department as a tenure-track professor in 1970. At that time he was consulting at the National Center for Atmospheric Research. He received tenure in 1974 and continued to teach as an associate professor until 1980. He left to take a position at the National Bureau of Standards in Gaithersburg, Maryland. Two years later he transferred to a position at the National Bureau of Standards Labs in Boulder and rejoined the Mathematics Department at University of Colorado in Denver as a full professor and Director of the Computational Mathematics Group. He retired from the university in 1996. In 1998 he moved to Seattle to work on a digital image compression project for a small start-up firm, LizardTech, and later to McKinney, Texas, where he worked on programming and software projects.
