= Lloyd James (cricketer) =

Bermudian cricketer (1937–2019)

Personal information
- Full name: Lloyd James
- Born: 27 January 1937; Bermuda
- Died: 13 April 2019 (aged 82)
- Batting: Right-handed
- Bowling: Right-arm medium-fast

Domestic team information
- Years: Team
- 1971/72: Bermuda

Career statistics
Competition	First-class
Matches	1
Runs scored	10
Batting average	5.00
100s/50s	–/–
Top score	8
Balls bowled	–
Wickets	–
Bowling average	–
5 wickets in innings	–
10 wickets in match	–
Best bowling	–
Catches/stumpings	–/–
- Source: CricketArchive, 13 October 2011

Lloyd James (27 January 1937 – 15 April 2019) was a Bermudian cricketer.

James was born in Bermuda. He was a right-handed batsman and right-arm medium-fast bowler. He played one first-class match for Bermuda, against New Zealand in 1972. It was the maiden first-class match to be played by the Bermuda cricket team.
