= Morton Sosland =

American businessman (1925–2019)

Morton Sosland (May 7, 1925 – April 25, 2019) was an American businessman.

Sosland, grandson of Jewish emigres from Czarist Russia, was a prominent Kansas City businessman who died in April 2019. Born in 1925, he began working for the Sosland Publishing Company in 1947, serving as the company's publisher and editor for several decades. A graduate of Southwest High School, Sosland entered Harvard University in 1942. After his first year of study, however, he left school to enlist in the U.S. Army. Sosland served in WWII under General Patton during the Battle of the Bulge. He returned to Harvard University in 1946 to complete his coursework in business and economics. After marrying Estelle Glatt, he came back to Kansas City in 1947.

== Food industry ==
Sosland had a long career in the grain and food publishing business. At 22, he joined the Sosland Publishing Company, a firm specializing in trade journals started by his father David and uncle Samuel. The company, founded in 1922, printed news and information about agricultural forecasts, food trends, and global consumer markets. Sosland rose through company ranks eventually creating much of the editorial content for several of the company magazines, including their very influential flagship, Milling and Baking News. By the 1970s, Sosland was an internationally known authority on food markets and global politics.

== Kansas City Involvement ==
Morton and Estelle Sosland were extremely involved in the Kansas City community including support of several Jewish community organizations, as well as the Midwest Research Institute (now MRI Global), Menorah Medical Center, and especially, the Nelson-Atkins Museum of Art. The 2009 gift of their personal collection of Native American art formed the foundation for the museum's native arts gallery. Most famously (and controversially), the Sosland's commissioned the Shuttlecocks, the now iconic oversized badminton birdies that grace the lawn of the Nelson-Atkins. When first unveiled, the sculptures, created by artists Claes Oldenburg and Coosje van Bruggen, were panned by critics. Said one local newspaper editor, the birdies are "so offensively silly looking that they simply have to be included in any article about Kansas Citians being played as saps." Today, these sculptures are an important part of the visual landscape of the city.

Of his community support, Sosland reported, "I was brought up to feel that we all owe something to the world around us." In 1954, he started the Sosland Foundation serving as its president for many years. He also served on the boards of many local foundations including those "with a considerable Kansas City presence including H&R Block, Inc., Commerce Bancshares, Inc., ERC Corporation, Hallmark Cards, Inc., Kansas City Southern Industries, Stilwell Financial, Inc., and Trans World Airlines. He also was a member of the board of Brown Shoe Co., Inc., Ingredient Technology Corp., TW Services, Inc., and Continental Grain Co." In recognition of his service, Sosland received numerous awards and recognition. In 1975, he was selected as "Mr. Kansas City" by the Greater Kansas City Chamber of Commerce. He also received the Chancellor's Medal from the University of Missouri—Kansas City and induction into the Academy of Missouri Squires in 1987. In 2002, he received the Leader in Agriculture Award and in 2006, he was in the first class of the Baking Hall of Fame.

In the UK Morton and Estelle Sosland maintained a home in Sussex for many years, and supported diverse charities including Glyndebourne, and also helped the British Museum acquire nearly 200 works.

Of Sosland's noted importance to his home community, one leader remarked that, "We are humbled by what he accomplished in his many decades as a civic leader and how he raised the level of what Kansas City is."
