= Elaine Rapp =

American sculptor, educator, and art therapist (1927–2019)

- Rapp in 1967
- Born: October 27, 1927
- Died: April 15, 2019 (aged 91); Great Neck, New York
- Occupations: sculptor, educator, art therapist

Elaine Rapp (October 27, 1927 – April 15, 2019) was an American sculptor, educator, and art therapist. She was known for her role in the resurgence of direct stone sculpture, and especially for her international stone-carving workshops.

== Biography ==
Rapp grew up in the Bronx, married after graduating from high school, and had a daughter, Stephanie. When her daughter was six, Rapp continued her education, and eventually ended up at the Art Students League of New York under the tutelage of sculptors John Hovannes and William Zorach. While studying sculpture, Rapp also began a lifelong interest in humanistic psychology, and after a successful one-woman gallery exhibit, she would devote most of her career to combining the two disciplines.

The exhibit, held in January 1967 at New York’s Bodley Gallery, featured twenty-six of Rapp’s sculptures, in marble, limestone, alabaster, and other stones, all of them hand-carved with hammer and chisel. All but eight pieces were sold to private collectors and museums, including a bust purchased by the Evansville Museum of Art in Indiana.

Three years later, Rapp launched her stone-carving workshops, first in her Manhattan loft, and subsequently in Mexico, Canada, and England. In 1971, she began teaching at Pratt Institute in Brooklyn, New York, became a registered art therapist in 1975, and was later on board certified. She also became a full member of the New York Institute for Gestalt Therapy, after receiving training from co-founder Laura Perls.

Rapp believed that stone sculpture and Gestalt therapy were congruent, because both dealt with “what’s emerging.” This philosophy informed her stone-carving workshops, which were attended by students who in many cases were artistic novices. Contending that “I could teach anybody to carve a stone,” Rapp once filled a gymnasium at Pratt with over a hundred students, and got each of them to produce a stone sculpture in a matter of hours.

Rapp ceased her workshops in the mid-nineties, and retired from Pratt in 2005.

Rapp died in Great Neck, New York, on April 15, 2019, at the age of 91.
