= Annie May Alston Lewis =

American religious librarian

- Born: November 26, 1917
- Died: March 9, 2006 (aged 88)
- Occupation: Theological Librarian

Academic background
- Education: B.A., B.S., A.M., M.A.
- Alma mater: Harding University, George Peabody College, University of Chicago

Annie May Alston Lewis (November 26, 1917—March 9, 2006) was a theological librarian affiliated with the Churches of Christ. She earned a B.A. in English from Harding College in 1939, a B.S. in Library Science from George Peabody College in 1943, an A.M. from the University of Chicago in 1952, and an M.A. from Harding Graduate School of Religion in 1967. Lewis was assistant professor of English at Harding College, 1944–47; Librarian at Harding College, 1947–54 and 1956–62; and Librarian at the Harding Graduate School of Religion, 1962–1983.

== Early life ==
Annie May Alston was born in Henning, Tennessee, November 26, 1917. She attended David Lipscomb College for two years and then graduated from Harding College, now Harding University, in 1939 with a degree in English. Alston taught in public schools for several years and completed a B.S. in library science at George Peabody College in 1943.

In 1944 Alston began teaching English at Harding College and served as head librarian there from 1947 to 1952. During these years in the summers, she worked on and completed an A.M. from the University of Chicago in 1952. After a leave of absence, she returned to Harding and was the head librarian from 1956 to 1962.

In 1962 Alston moved to Memphis, Tennessee, to become the head librarian at the Harding University Graduate School of Religion, now Harding School of Theology. While working full-time as librarian, she completed an M.A. at the Graduate School in 1967.

On November 23, 1978, Alston married Jack P. Lewis, fellow professor at the Harding Graduate School of Religion.

== Professional career ==
When Annie May Alston Lewis became the librarian at Harding Graduate School of Religion in 1962, she became the first theological librarian among the churches of Christ. She built the holdings of the L.M. Graves Library from some 5,000 volumes and 82 periodical subscriptions to nearly 69,000 volumes and 582 periodical subscriptions. She developed a course to help students improve writing and research skills and to familiarize them with the basic research tools in theology.

Lewis served in leadership roles in professional organizations: president of the Arkansas Library Association, charter member and leader in the Tennessee Theological Library Association and Christian College Librarians, member and officer in the Memphis Area Library Council, and a member of the American Theological Library Association. She was listed in Who's Who in America, Who's Who of American Women, and Outstanding Educators of America.

Lewis taught women's Bible classes for more than 30 years and spoke at numerous university lectureships and women's programs for more than 40 years.

== Honors and awards ==
Lewis became the first woman to be honored as a distinguished alumna by Harding College in 1968. She and Jack P. Lewis were joint recipients of Harding University's Distinguished Service Award in 1979 and again in 1998. They were joint recipients of the Exemplary Service Award at the Harding Graduate School in 2004. Lewis was the only person twice honored as alumna of the year by Harding Graduate School, first in 1993 and again posthumously in April 2006.

In 1975 Lewis received the 20th Century Christian Literature award. Lewis and her husband jointly received the Distinguished Christian Service Award from Pepperdine University in 1992 and the Distinguished Work and Practical Christian Service Award from Freed-Hardeman University in 1998.

In 2009 Still Living by Faith: A Collection of Lectures was published posthumously to honor her lifetime of teaching.

In 2012 Harding University honored Lewis by naming an apartment building in her memory in Legacy Park, a new housing development for students.
