= Enrique Álvarez Conde =

Spanish academic (1952–2019)

Enrique Álvarez Conde (1952 – 1 April 2019) was a Spanish academic.

He was born in the town of Matilla de Arzón, located in the province of Zamora, in 1952. He graduated in law from the University of Valladolid (UVA). He worked as an assistant professor of political law in the center between 1974 and 1976. This year he got his doctorate in law at UVA.

He also taught at the University of Alicante, at the Autonomous University of Madrid and at the University of Alcalá de Henares. In 1987 he obtained the chair at the University of Valencia. In 1992 the first edition of his Constitutional Law manual was published, that with more than 15 editions, it became one of the books with greater edition of his Handbook of Constitutional Law was published. which saw 15 editions in the following 25 years.

In 1996, after the arrival of the Popular Party (PP) to the presidency of the Government, he was appointed general director of the National Institute of Public Administration (INAP), a position he held until 1999. That same year he became a professor at the King Juan Carlos University (URJC). In 2001 he was put in charge of the new Institute of Public Law (IDP), a satellite organization of the URJC, with great autonomy.

== Caso Cifuentes ==
Involved in the so-called Caso Cifuentes, he affirmed in April 2018 having ordered -according to Álvarez Conde, on the demand of the Rector Javier Ramos- the reconstruction [sic] on April 21, 2018 of an act of the defense of the Master's Thesis that allegedly Cristina Cifuentes would have performed on July 2, 2012 at the Vicálvaro campus of the URJC. A few days later the URJC announced the suspension of Álvarez Conde as director of the IDP.

Shortly after, he was summoned by the magistrate's court number 51 of Madrid to declare as imputed by a presumed crime of documentary falsification. He was prosecuted as presumed brain of the plot in November 2018. He died on 1 April 2019, of lung cancer.
