= Lotte Newman =

British physician

Lotte Newman (22 January 1929-26 April 2019) was a British physician and second female president of the Royal College of General Practitioners.

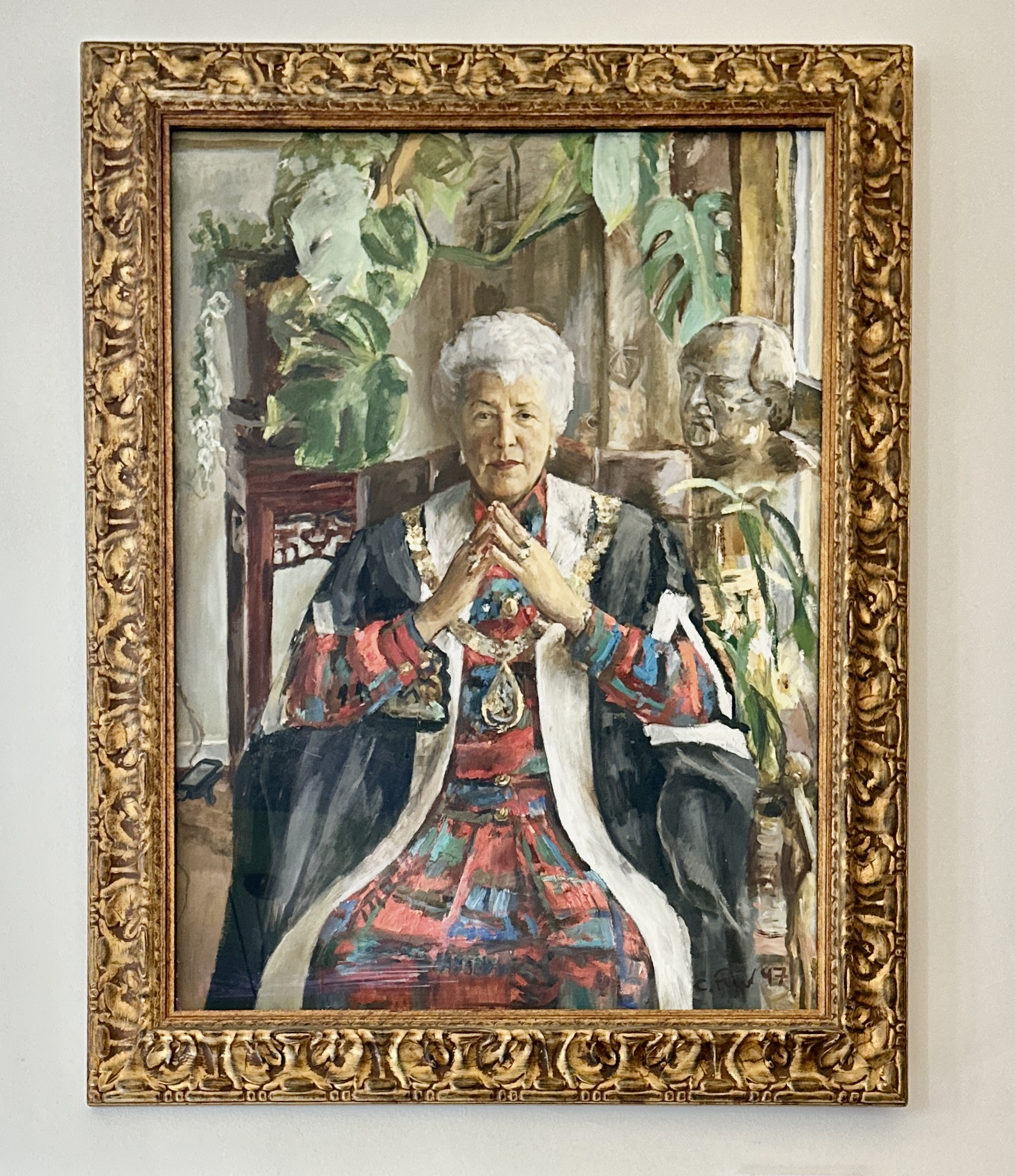
Lotte Newman portrait
