= Matilla de Arzón =

Coordinates: 42°06′N 5°38′W

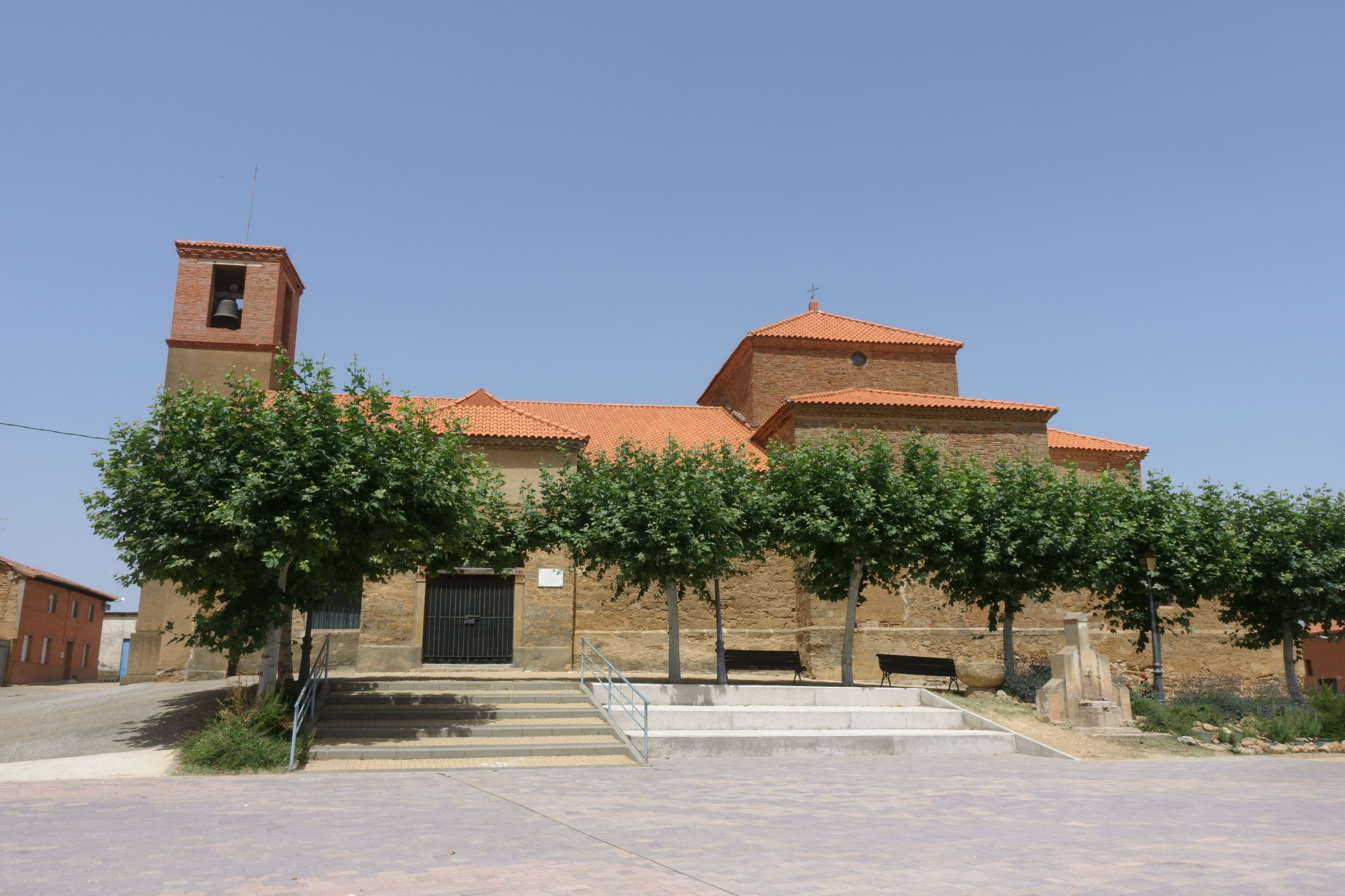
- Interactive map of Matilla de Arzón
- Country: Spain
- Autonomous community: Castile and León
- Province: Zamora
- Municipality: Matilla de Arzón

Government
  - Mayor: Consuelo Morán Astorga

Area
  - Total: 30 km^{2} (12 sq mi)

Population (2025-01-01)
  - Total: 150
  - Density: 5.0/km^{2} (13/sq mi)
- Time zone: UTC+1 (CET)
  - Summer (DST): UTC+2 (CEST)
- Website: Official website

Matilla de Arzón is a municipality located in the province of Zamora, Castile and León, Spain. According to the 2004 census (INE), the municipality has a population of 246 inhabitants.
