= Carol Thomas (gynaecologist) =

South African gynecologist (died 2019)

Carol Thomas (died 12 April 2019) was a South African gynaecologist who founded iMobiMaMa and theWomanSpace. She became the first woman to chair the South African Menopause Society in 2016.

Thomas was honoured by the Planned Parenthood Association of South Africa for "Selfless Dedication and Commitment to Reproductive and Sexual Health and Rights".

The daughter of Gilbert Thomas and Madge Petersen, Thomas studied at the University of Cape Town. Initially barred from studying medicine due to Apartheid laws, she registered for a BSc before transferring. She qualified with a MBChB in 1983. Her Master of Medicine dissertation won the SJ Behrman Prize for excellence in 1994.

Thomas worked at Groote Schuur Hospital for 24 years until 2010. She co-edited The South African Women’s Health Book and served as women's health activist since the 1980s. She also advised the Government of South Africa on Policy Guidelines and Development for Reproductive Health.

Thomas led the IPPF (International Planned Parenthood Federation) team to assess reproductive health services in Tanzania, and represented the South African branch at the IPPF World Assembly in the Philippines in 1995.

She founded iMobiMaMa, a mobile service providing health advice to pregnant women. She practiced from theWomanSpace in Claremont, Cape Town, with surgical attachment to Kingsbury Hospital.

Thomas died of complications following a double lung transplant on 12 April 2019. In 2020 the first Carol Thomas Memorial Lecture was given at the SA Society of Obstetricians and Gynaecologists' 39th national congress where Thomas was also honoured with a posthumous lifetime achievement award.
