= Duncan Green (British Army officer) =

Officer in the Indian army and Gurkha regiment

Brigadier Duncan Ross Green CBE, MC (1925–2019) was an officer of the British and Indian armies, who led Gurkhas against the Indonesian incursion into Malaysia.
