= Nurit Karlin =

Israeli cartoonist (1938–2019)

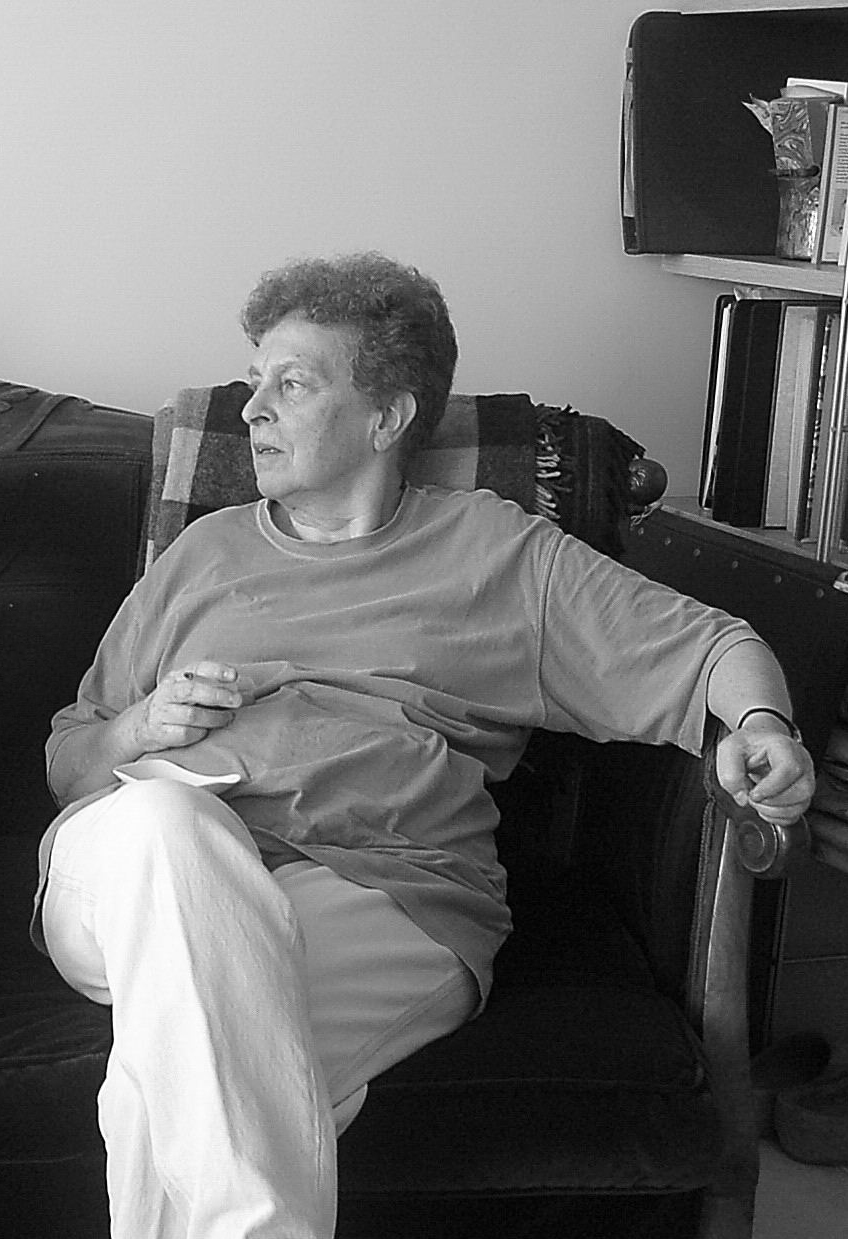
- Nurit Karlin, 2007
- Native name: נורית קרלין
- Born: 26 December 1938
- Died: 30 April 2019
- Language: Hebrew

Nurit Karlin (Hebrew: נורית קרלין; 26 December 1938 - 30 April 2019) was an Israeli cartoonist, known for her cartoons in The New Yorker.

Karlin joined The New Yorker as a regular cartoonist in 1974 and worked there for fourteen years.

She wrote the 1996 children's book The Fat Cat Sat on the Mat.
