= Shridhar Sathe =

American academic (1950–2019)

- Born: October 30, 1950; Pune, Maharashtra, India
- Died: April 4, 2019 (aged 68); Tallahassee, Florida, United States of America
- Citizenship: Indian (before 2000) and American (after 2000)
- Education: Utah State University; Institute of Chemical Technology
- Spouse: Sandhya Sathe (m. 1984-2019, his death)
- Children: 1
- Scientific career
- Fields: Protein biochemistry, food allergy, food science
- Workplaces: Florida State University; University of Arizona; Purdue University
- Thesis: Investigations on the Great Northern beans (Phaseolus vulgaris L.) : protein functionality, antinutrients, flatus factors, fermentation, and carbohydrates (May 1981)
- Doctoral advisor: D.K. "Chip" Salunkhe

Shridhar Krishna Sathe (October 30, 1950 – April 4, 2019) was an Indian-born American scientist who was a distinguished professor of food science at Florida State University. He is widely cited as an authority on the role of proteins in food allergy.

== Early life and education ==
Sathe was born on October 30, 1950, in Pune, Maharashtra, India, to Krishna Sathe, a clerk, and Kumudini Sathe (Née: Varna Damle,) a homemaker. The oldest of three sons, Sathe split his time between his immediate family and a relative's house growing up. He became familiar with different types of foods and agriculture thanks to exposures to farm life in his childhood and youth. These early life exposures are likely to have contributed to his eventual career choice. He was in the top five percent of his high school class and a National Merit Scholar.

He obtained bachelor's degrees in chemistry and food technology, and a master's in food technology, all at the University Department of Chemical Technology (then part of University of Bombay, now Institute of Chemical Technology). He moved to the US in 1977 and earned a PhD from Utah State University in 1981.

== Career ==
Sathe began his academic career as a postdoc first at University of Arizona in Tucson, Arizona (1981–1985), and then at Purdue University in West Lafayette, Indiana (1986–1988). He joined Florida State University in 1988, where he remained for the rest of his life. He was named the Robert O. Lawton Distinguished Professor and Hazel K. Stiebling Professor of Food Science at FSU. He was naturalized as a US citizen in 2000.

His research program was focused on identifying tree nut allergy proteins, developing antibody-based enzyme linked immunosorbent assays (ELISAs) for their detection and quantification, and identifying and characterizing epitopes in tree nut allergenic proteins. Sathe served on USDA NRICGP and EPA FQPA review panels (among others,) several national committees of the Institute of Food Technologists (IFT), and was a frequently sought reviewer by scientific journals in food science and technology. He was an elected fellow of the IFT and also served on the editorial boards of Journal of Food Science, Journal of Agriculture and Food Chemistry, Journal of Food Biochemistry, LWT-Food Science and Technology, Plant Foods for Human Nutrition, and Korean Food Science and Biotechnology. In addition, he was a distinguished teaching professor and graduate advisor. Sathe also served as a pre-health advisor for undergraduate students.

== Illness and death ==
In addition to growing up without ready access to clean water, Sathe was a smoker from the time he was 14 until the time he was 49. In 2012, Sathe was first hospitalized with mouth cancer and a subsequent heart attack. He survived the illnesses, only to have them both recur in 2016.

Sathe died in 2019 of bile duct cancer. After his death, there were confirmed cases of cancer among professors who had never smoked and who had worked in the same building, and floor, Sathe worked in at Florida State University. An environmental health investigation concluded that no evidence of abnormal exposure to chemicals was found.
