= Ronald G. Lewis =

Native American social worker (1941–2019)

- Born: December 3, 1941; Muskogee, Oklahoma, U.S.
- Died: April 14, 2019 (aged 77); Columbia, South Carolina, U.S.
- Education: University of Denver
- Occupation: Social worker
- Children: 3

Ronald Gene Lewis (December 3, 1941 – April 14, 2019) was the first American Indian to receive a PhD in the field of social work (which he received from the University of Denver) in 1974, was declared a NASW Social Work Pioneer, and has become known as the “Father of American Indian Social Work.”

In addition, he was the first American Indian tenured in the University of Wisconsin System, first American Indian Full Professor in the field of Social Work, and first American Indian to hold the position of "Dean" in Canada.

Born in Muskogee, Oklahoma, Lewis had his first academic appointment in 1975 at the University of Oklahoma's School of Social Work. From there Lewis was tenured at the University of Wisconsin–Milwaukee, Arizona State University, and at the Saskatchewan Indian Federated College as Dean. Additionally, Lewis has guest lectured across the country at universities for 30 years.

Beyond the academic world, Lewis was a psychiatric social worker who developed mental health programs for American Indians at the Tahlequah and Claremore Indian Hospitals in Oklahoma and later for the state of Oklahoma. As the director of the Indian Liaison Office at the Fitzsimons Medical Hospital in Aurora, Colorado, he worked with returning American Indian Vietnam veterans. Lewis also trained hospital and medical personnel about culturally appropriate services for American Indians. Always a political activist, during this time Lewis was also at the Wounded Knee Incident in 1973 and the Alcatraz takeover.

Landmark legislation concerning culturally appropriate services for American Indian people is an important part Lewis’s work. Well known as a leading expert on American Indian social problems, he has published extensively on federal policy in Indian Country, child abuse and neglect, and alcoholism and the American Indian (which became a special report to the U.S. Congress in 1980). He and his work also contributed to the creation of the Indian Child Welfare Act in 1978. Lewis has made contributions to American Indian issues at every level, including meetings with U.S. presidents, reports to Congress, and creating curriculum at universities.

Lewis died from cancer in Columbia, South Carolina, on April 14, 2019, at the age of 77.
