= Anne Lewis (attorney) =

American attorney (died 2019)

Anne W. Lewis (died 2019) was an American Republican attorney in Georgia. Lewis was known for leading redistricting efforts, campaign finance, and litigation related to voter ID laws on behalf of the Georgia Republican Party. Lewis had been a partner at the law firms Strickland Brockington Lewis and Taylor English. Lewis was an at-large delegate at the 2016 Republican National Convention.
