= Plovdiv University "Paisii Hilendarski" =

Public university in Plovdiv, Bulgaria

- Пловдивски университет „Паисий Хилендарски“
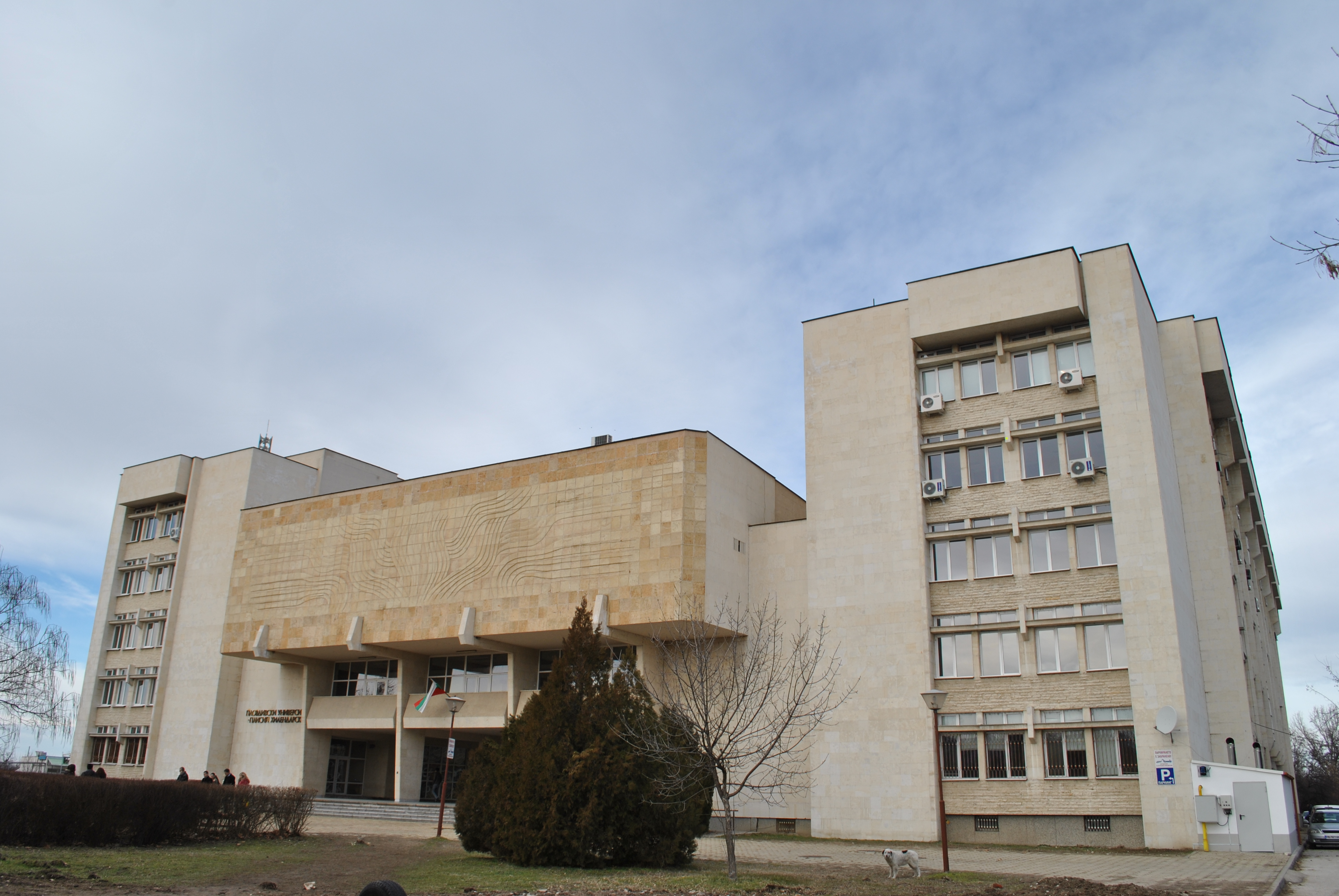
- Type: Public
- Established: 1962
- Academic staff: 561
- Students: 18,000
- Location: Plovdiv, Bulgaria; 42°8′17″N 24°45′3″E
- Website: www.uni-plovdiv.bg/

The University of Plovdiv "Paisii Hilendarski" (Bulgarian: Пловдивски университет „Паисий Хилендарски“), also known as The Paisii Hilendarski University of Plovdiv, is a university located in Plovdiv, Bulgaria. It was founded in 1962 and has nine faculties.

== History and profile ==
Plovdiv University, named in honor of the Bulgarian historian Paisii Hilendarski (known as Saint Paisius of Hilendar in English), is the city’s leading cultural and scientific institution. It is the largest institution of higher education in southern Bulgaria and the third largest Bulgarian university, after St. Kliment Ohridski University of Sofia and St. Cyril and St. Methodius University of Veliko Tarnovo.

In 1945 the University of Plovdiv was inaugurated by a Decree of the Regents’ Council of August the 4th, promulgated the same year in the State Gazette of August 20, structured in two faculties: Medicine and Agriculture and Forestry, which in July 1961 was reorganized as Higher Teacher-Training Institute of Natural and Mathematical Sciences. The institute was promoted to university status by government decree on 12 January 1972, when it took its present name “Paisiy Hilendarski” Plovdiv University.

In 1973, it became the first higher institution in Plovdiv to offer language and literature studies, offering B.A. degrees in Bulgarian and Russian Languages and Literature. Soon after, a program in Slavonic Languages and Literature (with specialization in Czech Language and Literature) was added. A degree in Education was offered for the first time in 1984, Law degree programs were introduced in 1992, and Economics degree programs were launched in 1994.

Today the University of Plovdiv is a true university by international standards, since it provides training to students in the four major fields of higher education: natural sciences, humanities, social sciences, and economics. “Paisiy Hilendarski” Plovdiv University has been institutionally accredited by National Certification and Accreditation Board (Protocol No. 1 of 15 February 2001). Over 7,500 full-time and 5,000 part-time students are enrolled in the programs and courses by the university’s nine faculties. The full-time teaching staff consists of 34 full professors, 167 associate professors and 360 assistant professors.

The university also comprises a Technical College in Smolyan as well as two branches outside of Plovdiv: a Smolyan branch, successor to the Teacher Training Institute opened in 1962 as part of the old Bulgarian tradition in teacher training, and a branch in Kardzhali, successor of semi-Pedagogical Institute "L.Karavelov" - Kardzhali founded in 1961.

== Organization ==
The nine faculties in which the university is divided into are:

- Faculty of Biology
- Faculty of Economics and Social Science
- Faculty of Mathematics and Informatics
- Faculty of Education ('Faculty of Pedagogics')
- Faculty of Physics
- Faculty of Languages and Literature ('Faculty of Philology')
- Faculty of Philosophy and History
- Faculty of Chemistry
- Faculty of Law

== See also ==
- List of colleges and universities
