= 2019 in Brazil =

Events in the year 2019 in Brazil.

== Incumbents ==
=== Federal government ===
- President: Jair Bolsonaro
- Vice President: Hamilton Mourão

=== Governors ===
- Acre: Gladson Cameli
- Alagoas: Renan Filho
- Amapa: Waldez Góes
- Amazonas: Wilson Lima
- Bahia: Rui Costa
- Ceará: Camilo Santana
- Espírito Santo: Renato Casagrande
- Goiás: Ronaldo Caiado
- Maranhão: Flávio Dino
- Mato Grosso: Mauro Mendes
- Mato Grosso do Sul: Reinaldo Azambuja
- Minas Gerais: Romeu Zema
- Pará: Helder Barbalho
- Paraíba: João Azevêdo
- Paraná: Ratinho Júnior
- Pernambuco: Paulo Câmara
- Piauí: Wellington Dias
- Rio de Janeiro:
  - Luiz Fernando Pezão (until 1 January)
  - Wilson Witzel (from 1 January)
- Rio Grande do Norte: Fátima Bezerra
- Rio Grande do Sul: Eduardo Leite
- Rondônia: Marcos Rocha
- Roraima: Antonio Denarium
- Santa Catarina: Carlos Moisés
- São Paulo: João Doria
- Sergipe: Belivaldo Chagas
- Tocantins: Mauro Carlesse

=== Vice governors ===
- Acre: Wherles Fernandes da Rocha
- Alagoas: José Luciano Barbosa da Silva
- Amapá: Jaime Domingues Nunes
- Amazonas: Carlos Alberto Souza de Almeida Filho
- Bahia: João Leão
- Ceará: Izolda Cela
- Espírito Santo: Jacqueline Moraes da Silva
- Goiás: Lincoln Graziane Pereira da Rocha
- Maranhão: Carlos Brandão
- Mato Grosso: Otaviano Olavo Pivetta
- Mato Grosso do Sul: Murilo Zauith
- Minas Gerais: Paulo Brant
- Pará: Lúcio Dutra Vale
- Paraíba: Lígia Feliciano
- Paraná: Darci Piana
- Pernambuco: Luciana Barbosa de Oliveira Santos
- Piaui: Regina Sousa
- Rio de Janeiro:
  - Francisco Dornelles (until 1 January)
  - Cláudio Castro (starting 1 January)
- Rio Grande do Norte: Antenor Roberto
- Rio Grande do Sul: Ranolfo Vieira Júnior
- Rondônia: José Atílio Salazar Martins
- Roraima: Frutuoso Lins Cavalcante Neto
- Santa Catarina: Daniela Cristina Reinehr
- São Paulo: Rodrigo Garcia
- Sergipe: Eliane Aquino Custódio
- Tocantins: Wanderlei Barbosa

== Events ==
=== January ===
- January 1: Jair Bolsonaro is sworn in as the 38th President of Brazil.
- January 4: The federal government sends National Forces to Ceará, after a wave of attacks carried out by criminal organizations.
- January 8: Brazil formally withdraws from the UN's Global Compact for Migration pact, however, Brazilian Foreign Minister Ernesto Araújo says that the country will continue to accept Venezuelan refugees.
- January 25: A mining dam owned by Vale, collapses in Brumadinho, Minas Gerais, after suffering a catastrophic failure. 259 people are officially declared dead and 11 others are reported missing.
- January 26: Israeli Prime Minister Benjamin Netanyahu authorizes the deployment of a military group from the Israel Defense Forces to assist in search for survivors in Brumadinho, Minas Gerais.
- January 30: After 124 years, writer Ângela Gutiérrez becomes the first woman to preside over the Academia Cearense de Letras (Cearense Academy of Letters).

=== February ===
- February 1: Rodrigo Maia is reelected President of Chamber of Deputies.
- February 2: Davi Alcolumbre is elected President of Senate.
- February 6: Heavy rain hits Rio de Janeiro, leaving six people dead and two missing.
- February 8: A fire at the Flamengo youth academy in Rio de Janeiro, leaves ten people dead and three injured.
- February 11:
  - Journalist and news anchor Ricardo Boechat, along with his pilot, is killed in a helicopter crash in São Paulo.
  - A fire hits a Bangu lodge, where three people are taken to the hospital.
  - A fire hits the Belo Monte Dam.
  - A supermarket catches fire in Jacaré, Rio de Janeiro, leaving two people with minor injuries.
- February 13: The Supreme Federal Court debate on the criminalization of homophobia and transphobia in Brazil.
- February 17: Four children are dead after a landslide in Mauá, São Paulo.

=== March ===
- March 11: Heavy rain in São Paulo causes flooding and blocks access roads, resulting in 12 deaths and 4 injuries.
- March 13:
  - Two former military police officers are arrested for the murders of Marielle Franco and her driver Anderson Gomes. One of the suspects was arrested at home, in a Rio de Janeiro gated community where President Jair Bolsonaro also resides.
  - Two men, ages 17 and 25, kill seven people and wound 11 others at a school with a revolver and knife in Suzano, São Paulo. Among those killed are five students and two faculty members. The two shooters commit suicide afterwards. Police find a crossbow, Molotov cocktails, and a "suitcase with wires" at the scene.
- March 21: Former President Michel Temer and former Rio de Janeiro Governor Moreira Franco are arrested in Rio de Janeiro as part of an investigation into corruption.

=== April ===
- April 7: Musician Evaldo Rosa dos Santos and recyclable material collector Luciano Macedo are murdered in a drive-by shooting by Brazilian Army soldiers in Rio de Janeiro. Initially, it was reported that eighty shots had hit the vehicle, but the Judiciary Military Police later determine that the correct number was two hundred and fifty-seven.
- April 8: Unusual rain causes landslides, flooding and at least 10 deaths in Rio de Janeiro.
- April 25: President Jair Bolsonaro signs a law revoking daylight saving time in Brazil.

=== May ===
- May 11: A gambler wins R$289,420,865 in the Mega-Sena 2150 draw, which is the biggest prize in the history of regular contests (excluding the Mega da Virada draws).
- May 27: A small plane crashes in Estância, Sergipe, killing three people, including singer Gabriel Diniz.

=== June ===
- June 13: The Supreme Federal Court approves the criminalization of homophobia per the Racism Law.
- June 20: Three million evangelicals gather in São Paulo for the "March for Jesus" event.

=== July ===
- July 7: Brazil defeats Peru 3-1, to win the 2019 Copa America. This is Brazil's ninth Copa America trophy.
- July 29: Rival gangs battle for five hours, during a prison riot in Pará. At least 52 people are killed, including sixteen beheadings.

=== August ===
- August 20: A bus is hijacked on the Rio-Niterói bridge. The hijacking ends after police shoot and kill the hijacker.
- August 30: Oil stains appear on ten beaches in Paraíba, according to mapping data compiled by the Brazilian Institute of Environment and Renewable Natural Resources (Ibama). The oil spill would eventually worsen in October.

=== October ===
- October 15: Nine people are killed after a residential building collapses in Fortaleza.

=== November ===
- November 9: Former President Luiz Inácio Lula da Silva is released by judicial decision after 580 days in prison. This is after a Supreme Federal Court decision, that ended mandatory imprisonment of convicted criminals after their first appeal fail.
- November 12: President Jair Bolsonaro forms his new party Alliance for Brazil.
- November 23: Authorities name Carlos Eduardo dos Santos as the main suspect in the Killing of Rachel Genofre in November 2008.

=== December ===
- December 26: A group known as the "Popular Nationalist Insurgency Command of the Large Brazilian Integralist Family" claim responsibility for a firebombing at the headquarters of comedic group Porta dos Fundos in Rio de Janeiro.

== Arts and culture ==
- 2018–19 Brazil network television schedule
- List of Brazilian films of 2019

== Sports ==
- 2019 in Brazilian football

== Deaths ==
=== January ===
- January 8: José Belvino do Nascimento, 86, Roman Catholic prelate, Bishop of Itumbiara (1981–1987) and Divinópolis (1989–2009).
- January 9: Óscar González-Quevedo, 88, Spanish-born Brazilian Jesuit priest and parapsychologist, heart disease.
- January 15: Edyr de Castro, 72, actress (Roque Santeiro, Por Amor, Cabocla), and singer, multiple organ failure.
- January 28: Antônio Petrus Kalil, 93, criminal, pneumonia.

=== February ===
- February 6: Jairo do Nascimento, 72, footballer (Corinthians, Coritiba), kidney cancer.
- February 10: Daniel Silva dos Santos, 36, footballer, cancer.
- February 11: Ricardo Boechat, 66, Argentine-born Brazilian journalist (O Globo, O Dia, Jornal do Brasil), helicopter crash.
- February 13: Bibi Ferreira, 96, actress (Leonora of the Seven Seas, The End of the River) and singer.
- February 16: Silvestre Luís Scandián, 87, Roman Catholic prelate, Bishop of Araçuaí (1975–1981) and Archbishop of Vitória (1984–2004).
- February 19: João Paulo dos Reis Veloso, 87, economist, Minister of Planning (1969–1979), president of the Institute of Applied Economic Research (1969).
- February 23: Douglas, 51, Brazilian-born Swedish scarlet macaw actor (Pippi in the South Seas).
- February 25:
  - Waldo Machado, 84, footballer.
  - Paulo Nogueira Neto, 96, environmentalist, Secretary of the Environment (1974–1986).
  - Nelson Zeglio, 92, footballer (Sochaux, CA Paris).

=== March ===
- March 11: Coutinho, 75, football player and manager, heart attack.
- March 12: Eurico Miranda, 74, chairman of Vasco da Gama and politician.
- March 17: João Carlos Marinho, 83, writer (O Gênio do Crime).
- March 26: Rafael Henzel, 45, sports broadcaster, survivor of LaMia Flight 2933 crash, heart attack.

=== April ===
- April 7: Jean Paul Jacob, 81–82, Brazilian-American computer scientist.
- April 15: Marcelo Dascal, 78, Brazilian-born Israeli philosopher and linguist.
- April 19: MC Sapão, 40, singer, pneumonia.
- April 20: Valdiram, 36, footballer (CR Vasco da Gama), beaten.
- April 25: Dirceu Krüger, 74, footballer (Coritiba), heart attack.
- April 26: Zé do Carmo, 85, ceramist, heart attack.
- April 28:
  - Caroline Bittencourt, 37, model, drowned.
  - Maurício Peixoto, 98, engineer and mathematician.
- April 29: José Rodrigues Neto, 69, footballer, thrombosis.
- April 30: Beth Carvalho, 72, samba singer (Estação Primeira de Mangueira).

=== May ===
- May 14: Urbano José Allgayer, 95, Roman Catholic prelate, Bishop of Passo Fundo (1982–1999).
- May 18: Ney da Matta, 52, football manager (Ipatinga, Brasiliense, CRAC), pancreatitis.
- May 25: Lady Francisco, 84, actress.
- May 27: Gabriel Diniz, 28, singer and composer, plane crash.

=== June ===
- June 2: Luisinho Lemos, 67, footballer, heart attack.
- June 8: Andre Matos, 47, singer (Viper, Angra, Shaman), heart attack.
- June 9: Rafael Miguel, 22, actor (Chiquititas), shot.
- June 17: Moacyr Grechi, 83, Roman Catholic prelate, Archbishop of Porto Velho (1998–2011).
- June 22: Thalles, 24, football player (Vasco da Gama, Ponte Preta), traffic collision.
- June 28: Mário Jorge da Fonseca Hermes, 92, basketball player.

=== July ===
- July 6: João Gilberto, 88, singer-songwriter.
- July 10: Paulo Henrique Amorim, 77, journalist.
- July 28: Ruth de Souza, 98, actress.

=== August ===
- August 2: Gildo Cunha do Nascimento, 79, footballer (Palmeiras, Flamengo, Paranaense).
- August 9: Altair Gomes de Figueiredo, 81, footballer (Fluminense, national team).
- August 12: João Carlos Barroso, 69, actor, pancreatic cancer.
- August 23: Kito Junqueira, 71, actor (Eternamente Pagú) and politician.
- August 25: Fernanda Young, 49, novelist, screenwriter and actress (Os Normais), cardiac arrest.
- August 26: Walmir Alberto Valle, 81, Roman Catholic prelate, Bishop of Zé Doca (1991–2002) and Joaçaba (2003–2010), cancer.

=== September ===
- September 1: Alberto Goldman, 81, MP (1979–2006), Minister of Transport (1992–1993) and Governor of São Paulo (2010–2011), cancer.
- September 15: Roberto Leal, 67, Portuguese-Brazilian singer, skin cancer.
- September 28: Franco Cuter, 79, Italian-born Brazilian Roman Catholic prelate, Bishop of Grajaú (1998–2016).

=== October ===
- October 8: Serafim Fernandes de Araújo, 95, Roman Catholic cardinal, Archbishop of Belo Horizonte (1986–2004), complications from pneumonia.
- October 13: Elias James Manning, 81, American-born Brazilian Roman Catholic prelate, Bishop of Valença (1990–2014).
- October 24: Walter Franco, 74, singer and composer, stroke.
- October 25: Mário Sabino, 47, Olympic judoka (2000, 2004), shot.
- October 30: Ercílio Turco, 81, Roman Catholic prelate, Bishop of Limeira (1989–2002) and Osasco (2002–2014), cancer.

=== November ===
- November 1: Ary Kara, 77, Deputy (1983–2007), cancer.
- November 3: Girônimo Zanandréa, 83, Roman Catholic prelate, Coadjutor Bishop (1987–1994) and Bishop of Erexim (1994–2012).
- November 17: Tuka Rocha, 36, race car driver, plane crash.
- November 20: Fábio Barreto, 62, film director (Lula, Son of Brazil, O Quatrilho), complications from a traffic collision.
- November 22:
  - Gugu Liberato, 60, television presenter, fall.
  - Henry Sobel, 75, Portuguese-born Brazilian-American reform rabbi, cancer.

=== December ===
- December 5: Antônio Evanil da Silva, 84, footballer (Vasco da Gama).
- December 7: Altamira Cecília dos Santos, 96, Candomblé high priestess.
- December 19: Francisco Brennand, 92, painter and sculptor, respiratory infection.
- December 20: Zilda Cardoso, 83, actress
- December 28: Nilcéa Freire, 66, academic and politician, cancer.

== See also ==
- 2019 Pan American Games
