= Zé do Carmo =

Zé do Carmo may refer to:

- Zé do Carmo (ceramist), José do Carmo Souza (1933–2019), Brazilian ceramist
- Zé do Carmo (footballer), José do Carmo Silva Filho (born 1961), Brazilian football midfielder
