= Zeglio =

Zeglio is an Italian surname. Notable people with the surname include:

- Nelson Zeglio (1926–2019), Brazilian footballer
- Primo Zeglio (1906–1984), Italian film director and writer
- Renzo Pasquale Zeglio Agresta (born 1985), known as Renzo Agresta, Brazilian fencer
