= Cristiano Vale =

Brazilian politician (born 1970)

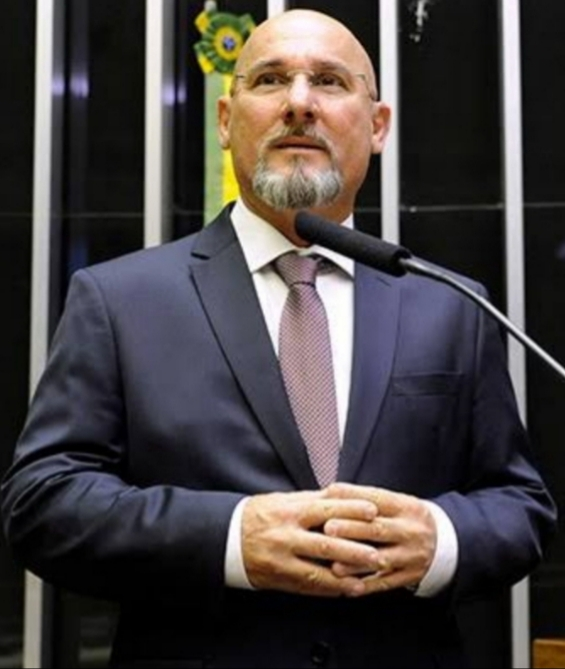
- Vale in 2021

Member of the Chamber of Deputies
- In office 1 February 2019 – 31 January 2023
- Constituency: Pará

Personal details
- Born: 10 April 1970 (age 56)
- Party: Progressistas (since 2022)
- Parent: Anivaldo Vale (father)
- Relatives: Lúcio Vale (brother)

Cristiano Dutra Vale (born 10 April 1970) is a Brazilian politician. He has served as mayor of Viseu since 2023, having previously served from 2009 to 2016. From 2019 to 2023, he was a member of the Chamber of Deputies.
