= Diocese of Grajaú =

Catholic ecclesiastical territory

Diocese of Grajaú Dioecesis Graiahuensis Diocese de Grajaú

Catholic
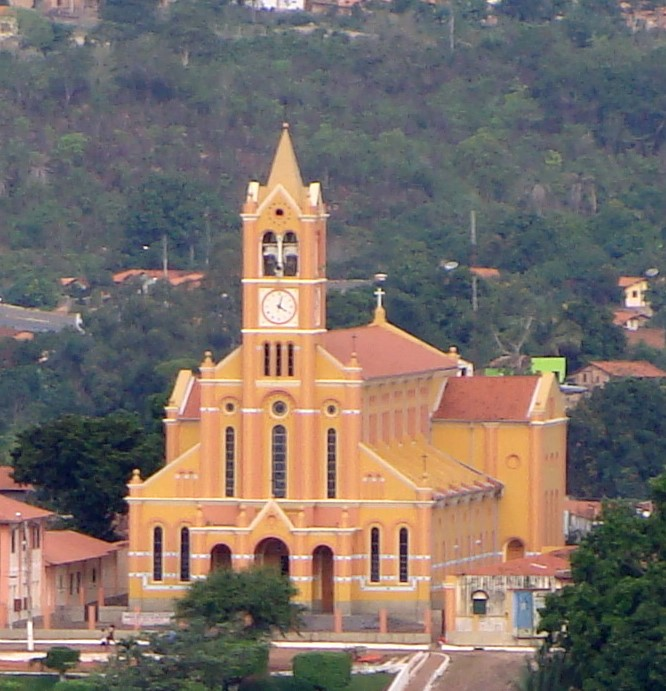
- Cathedral

Location
- Country: Brazil
- Metropolitan: Archdiocese of São Luís do Maranhão
- Headquarters: Grajaú, Maranhão, Brazil

Statistics
- Area: 38,742 km^{2} (14,958 sq mi)
- Population: Total; Catholics: (as of 2023); 434,038; 313,304 (72.2%)
- Parishes: 21

Information
- Denomination: Catholic Church
- Sui iuris church: Latin Church
- Rite: Roman Rite
- Established: 10 February 1922; 104 years ago
- Cathedral: Catedral Nosso Senhor do Bonfim e São José, Grajaú
- Patron saint: Saint Joseph

Current leadership
- Pope: Leo XIV
- Bishop: Giuseppe Luigi Spiga
- Metropolitan Archbishop: Gilberto Pastana de Oliveira
- Bishops emeritus: Serafino Faustino Spreafico, O.F.M.Cap.

The Roman Catholic Diocese of Grajaú (Latin: Dioecesis Graiahuensis) is a diocese located in the city of Grajaú in the ecclesiastical province of São Luís do Maranhão in Brazil.

== History ==
- 10 February 1922: Established as Territorial Prelature of São José do Grajaú from the Archdiocese of São Luís do Maranhão
- 4 August 1981: Promoted as Diocese of São José do Grajaú
- 9 October 1984: Renamed as Diocese of Grajaú

== Leadership ==
=== Ordinaries ===
Prelates of São José do Grajaú (Roman Rite)

- Roberto Julio Colombo, O.F.M.Cap. (18 December 1924 – 8 November 1927)
- Emiliano Giuseppe Lonati, O.F.M.Cap. (10 January 1930 – 19 February 1966), retired
- Adolfo Luís Bossi, O.F.M.Cap. (19 February 1966 – 22 August 1970), resigned
- Valentino Giacomo Lazzari, O.F.M.Cap. (18 May 1971 – 4 August 1981 see below)

Bishops of São José do Grajaú (Roman Rite)

- Valentino Giacomo Lazzari, O.F.M.Cap. (see above 4 August 1981 – 6 January 1983)
- Tarcísio Sebastião Batista Lopes, O.F.M.Cap. (4 April 1984 – 9 October 1984 see below)

Bishops of Grajaú (Roman Rite)

- Tarcísio Sebastião Batista Lopes, O.F.M.Cap. (see above 9 October 1984 – 19 December 1986), appointed Bishop of Ipameri, Goiás
- Serafino Faustino Spreafico, O.F.M.Cap. (13 May 1987 – 2 November 1995), resigned
- Franco Cuter, O.F.M.Cap. (21 January 1998 – 7 December 2016), retired
- Rubival Cabral Britto, O.F.M.Cap. (7 December 2016 – 13 March 2024), appointed Bishop of Bom Jesus da Lapa, Bahia
- Giuseppe Luigi Spiga (17 February 2025 – Present)

=== Coadjutor bishop ===
- Adolfo Luís Bossi, O.F.M.Cap. (1958-1966), succeeded
