= Caroline Bittencourt =

Brazilian model and television presenter (1981–2019)

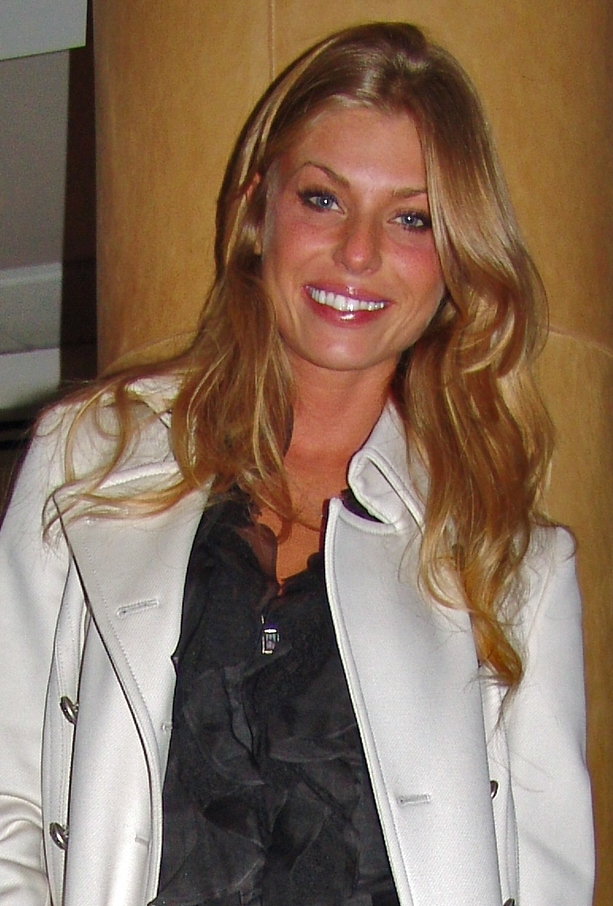
- Bittencourt in 2010
- Born: 13 December 1981; São Paulo, Brazil
- Died: 28 April 2019 (aged 37); Ilhabela, São Paulo, Brazil
- Occupations: Model; television presenter
- Years active: 1997–2019
- Children: 1
- Modeling information
- Height: 1.77 m (5 ft 10 in)
- Hair color: Blond
- Eye color: Blue
- Agency: OxygenModels (São Paulo)

Caroline Bittencourt (December 13, 1981 – April 28, 2019) was a Brazilian model and television presenter.

== Career ==
In 1997, at the age of fifteen, Bittencourt began her career as a model. Bittencourt had lived in Italy and modelled for designers including Valentino Garavani and Roberto Cavalli. On television, she worked for RedeTV! Bittencourt was a reporter for the Top Report and on RecordTV in the Hoje em Dia programme.

== Filmography ==
=== Television ===
| Year | Title | Role | Notes |
|---|---|---|---|
| 2005–07 | Top Report | Reporter | |
| 2008 | Hoje em Dia | Reporter | Quadro: Sete Segredos |
| 2013–2017 | Programa Amaury Jr. | Reporter | |

=== Internet ===
| Year | Title | Role |
|---|---|---|
| 2011–13 | What We Wonder | TV host |

=== Cinema ===
| Year | Title | Role |
|---|---|---|
| 2004 | Olga | Secretary |

== Personal life ==
Isabelle Bittencourt is her daughter. On January 26, 2019, Bittencourt married businessman Jorge Sestini in a ceremony in São Miguel dos Milagres.

=== Disappearance and death ===
Caroline Bittencourt disappeared on the afternoon of 28 April 2019, around 4.30 p.m., when she was taking a boat trip in Ilhabela, on the coast of state of São Paulo. During a strong storm in the area, the boat capsized, throwing those onboard into the sea. Caroline tried to save her dogs, moving further away from the boat, but drowned. The body of the model was later found by a civilian vessel that was aiding the search for her, near Cigarras Beach, in São Sebastião, about four kilometres from the place where the boat had disappeared. Bittencourt's father said "I jumped in the water to take the body away."

In May 2019, Sestini was indicted for manslaughter, for even though he had thrown himself into the sea to save his wife without success, he was accused of taking a risk when he decided to set out in the boat even though he knew that bad weather was expected that day. However, in September 2019, the public prosecutor of São Paulo asked the court to close the police investigation, citing a lack of clear evidence that the accused's actions were the proximate cause of Bittencourt's death, and suggesting that "the consequences affecting the investigated (wife's death) have proven to be more harmful than any penalty [that could be] imposed".
