= List of Brazilian films of 2019 =

This is a list of films produced in Brazil in 2019.

Title	Director	Cast (Subject of documentary)	Genre	Release date	Notes
Bacurau	Juliano Dornelles, Kleber Mendonça Filho	Sônia Braga	Action		Jury Prize (Cannes Film Festival)
Divino Amor	Gabriel Mascaro	Dira Paes	Drama		
A Vida Invisível	Karim Aïnouz	Carol Duarte, Fernanda Montenegro	Drama		
Turma da Mônica: Laços	Daniel Rezende		Adventure		
