= Lúcio Vale =

Brazilian politician (born 1972)

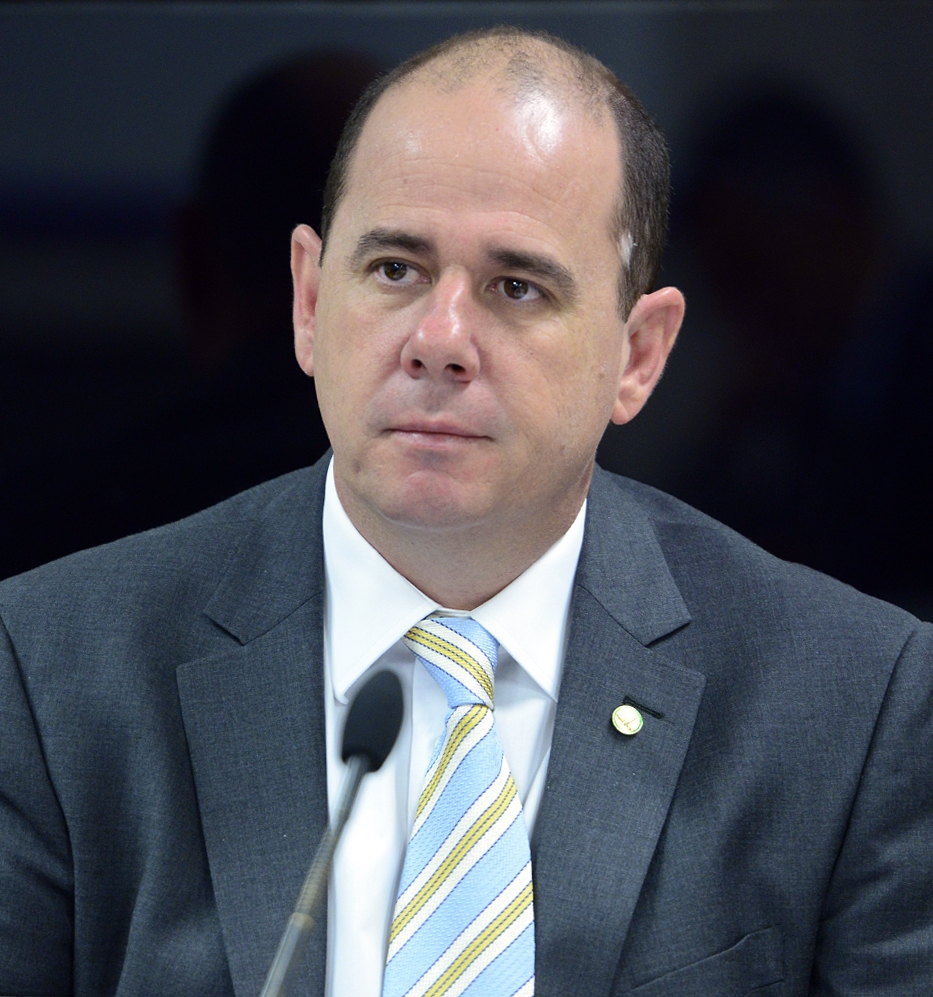
- Vale in 2015

Member of the Chamber of Deputies
- In office 1 February 2007 – 31 December 2018
- Constituency: Pará

Personal details
- Born: 27 December 1972 (age 53)
- Party: Independent (since 2021)
- Parent: Anivaldo Vale (father)
- Relatives: Cristiano Vale (brother)

Lúcio Dutra Vale (born 27 December 1972) is a Brazilian politician. From 2007 to 2018, he was a member of the Chamber of Deputies. From 2019 to 2021, he served as vice governor of Pará. He is the son of Anivaldo Vale and the brother of Cristiano Vale.
