= Grajaú, Maranhão =

Grajaú
- Municipality
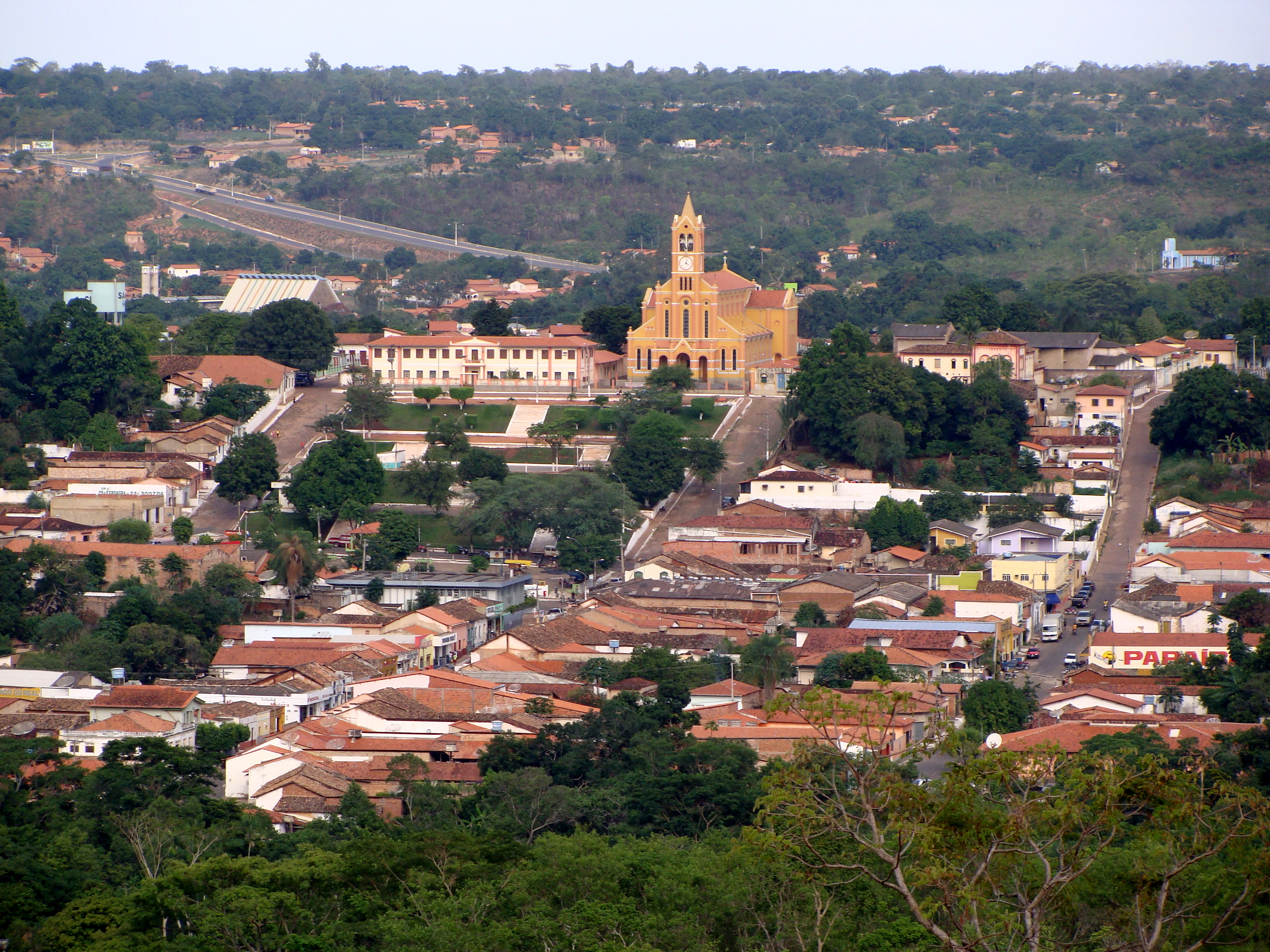
- View of Grajaú, Maranhão

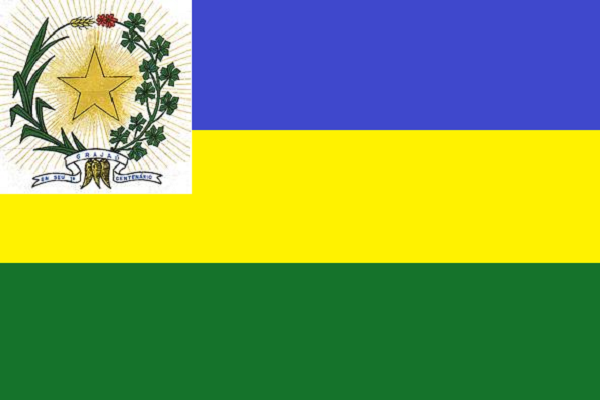
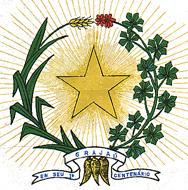
- Flag Coat of arms

- Location in Maranhão state

- Location in Brazil
- Coordinates: 5°49′8″S 46°8′20″W
- Country: Brazil
- Region: Northeast
- State: Maranhão

Area
  - Total: 8,864 km^{2} (3,422 sq mi)

Population (2020)
  - Total: 70,065
  - Density: 7.904/km^{2} (20.47/sq mi)
- Time zone: UTC-03:00 (BRT)

Grajaú is a municipality in the Brazilian state of Maranhão. Founded on 29 April 1811, its population in 2020 was of 70,065. The total area is 8,864 km^{2}.

It is one of the most important city in the south of the State. In Grajaú are located several industries of Plaster of Paris, as well as gypsum mining for other purposes (drywall, etc.). The city is the seat of the Roman Catholic Diocese of Grajaú.

== Climate ==
Climate data for Grajaú (1981–2010)
Month	Jan	Feb	Mar	Apr	May	Jun	Jul	Aug	Sep	Oct	Nov	Dec	Year
Mean daily maximum °C (°F)	31.2 (88.2)	30.8 (87.4)	30.9 (87.6)	31.4 (88.5)	32.2 (90.0)	32.8 (91.0)	33.6 (92.5)	34.7 (94.5)	35.2 (95.4)	34.1 (93.4)	33.0 (91.4)	31.9 (89.4)	32.7 (90.9)
Mean daily minimum °C (°F)	21.3 (70.3)	21.2 (70.2)	21.7 (71.1)	21.4 (70.5)	20.1 (68.2)	18.4 (65.1)	17.2 (63.0)	17.6 (63.7)	19.9 (67.8)	21.1 (70.0)	21.2 (70.2)	21.3 (70.3)	20.2 (68.4)
Average precipitation mm (inches)	184.7 (7.27)	213.9 (8.42)	243.5 (9.59)	171.5 (6.75)	41.8 (1.65)	17.0 (0.67)	2.2 (0.09)	7.3 (0.29)	37.5 (1.48)	53.5 (2.11)	100.8 (3.97)	133.9 (5.27)	1,207.6 (47.54)
Average precipitation days (≥ 1.0 mm)	12	14	16	12	5	2	0	1	2	5	7	12	88
Mean monthly sunshine hours	136.2	119.9	134.1	169.3	217.7	244.8	265.8	253.1	215.5	167.0	144.6	135.5	2,203.5
Source: Instituto Nacional de Meteorologia
