= Evaldo Rosa case =

Shooting of Evaldo Rosa
- Native name: Caso Evaldo Rosa
- Date: April 7, 2019
- Location: Guadalupe, Rio de Janeiro
- Also known as: Case of the 80 gunshots
- Type: Homicide
- Deaths: 2
- Accused: Lieutenant Ítalo da Silva Nunes Romualdo, Sergeant Fábio Henrique Souza Braz da Silva and soldiers Gabriel Christian Honorato, Matheus Santanna Claudino, Leonardo Delfino Costa, Marlon Conceição da Silva, João Lucas da Costa Gonçalo, Leonardo Oliveira de Souza, Gabriel da Silva de Barros Lins and Vítor Borges de Oliveira

The Case Evaldo Rosa, also known as the Case of the 80 gunshots, refers to the homicide of musician Evaldo Rosa dos Santos and recyclable material collector Luciano Macedo, which occurred on April 7, 2019, in the city of Rio de Janeiro. At 2:40 pm (BRT), Evaldo was driving a Ford Ka with five occupants down Camboatá Road when Brazilian Army soldiers opened fire. Evaldo was shot and died on the spot. Passenger Sérgio Gonçalves was wounded and Luciano, who was passing by and tried to help, was also shot and died eleven days later. The occupants of the vehicle and witnesses stated that the soldiers started firing abruptly, from behind, without any previous signaling or warning, and did not stop firing even after the musician's pregnant wife and son left the car. According to the Judicial Military Police, the military fired 257 rifle shots. 62 pierced the car.

The Eastern Military Command claimed that the military, on regular patrol, had encountered a robbery in the vicinity and that the victims initiated the exchange of fire. In the same note, it said that an innocent passerby had been the victim of the shooting. Later, the EMC published another note, stating that it had found inconsistencies in the statements of the military personnel, who were removed. Ten of the twelve military personnel in the detachment had their arrest decreed. One of them was released in a custody hearing held at the 1st Audit of the Military Justice on April 10, 2019 and the others on May 23, by decision of the Superior Military Court.

According to documents surveyed by Agência Pública, the military did not conduct regular patrols, but participated in "Operation Muquiço," in which the Army unconstitutionally acted as a public security force (since the 2018 decree guaranteeing law and order had already expired).

== Crime ==
On Sunday afternoon, April 7, 2019, Evaldo's car, which was passing along Camboatá Road, was shot at by rifle shots fired by nine Brazilian Army soldiers. Initially, it was reported that eighty shots had hit the vehicle, but the Military Judiciary Police later determined that the correct number was two hundred and fifty-seven. Evaldo's wife, his seven-year-old son, a family friend, and his father-in-law, who managed to get out of the car before most of the shots were fired, were also in the car.

Initially, it was thought that the victim was a burglar, based on the statements of the military personnel involved. However, after investigation by the Eastern Military Command, the idea was refuted and the military officers responsible were arrested in flagrante delicto. Since then, the case has also been investigated by the Homicide Police.

== Investigation ==
After the Eastern Military Command certified the inconsistency of the statements, ten of the twelve soldiers were heard and had their arrests decreed. For Leonardo Salgado, delegate of the Rio de Janeiro Homicide Police Station, "everything indicates that the military shot when they mistook the car for a robbery". In an interview to Globo, the delegate said that no weapon had been found and that the victimized family was, in fact, normal.

On the same day of the occurrence, the Civil Police found evidence for a flagrant arrest, since the action was incongruous with a possible self-defense due to the number of shots fired. The family friend, who was inside the car, challenged the Army's claim, stating that there was no signaling before the shooting, and that even as the passengers left, they continued firing. Concurring with the family friend's version, Luciana Nogueira, the musician's wife, reported that the military acted in a cold way, even with the egress of the car.

On April 10, 2019, the military's arrest became preventive detention. During a Military Justice custody hearing, it was found that the shots were fired without an obvious threat. Defense Minister Fernando Azevedo e Silva said that the case will be investigated and those responsible will be indicted. Only Soldier Leonardo Delfino Costa claimed not to have fired shots and may be removed from the investigation. In June 2019, a decision by the National Council of Public Prosecutors (CNMP) determined that the Federal Public Prosecutor's Office (MPF) would no longer investigate the case, leaving the investigation to be exclusive to the Military Public Prosecutor's Office (MPM). The decision generated criticism.

== Repercussion ==
The shooting of Evaldo Rosa was covered in several national and international media outlets, including the BBC, The Guardian, The Daily Telegraph, and a publication on Clarín.

On the other hand, newspapers like CartaCapital, Estadão, and the HuffPost Brasil publications highlighted the silence of the President of the Republic Jair Bolsonaro in relation to what happened. Otávio Rêgo Barros, a spokesperson for the Presidency of the Republic, reported that Bolsonaro showed no sorrow for the case. Wilson Witzel, governor of Rio de Janeiro, considered the military action a "grotesque error" and commented that he would await the outcome of the investigations, "it is not his place to attribute any consideration to the fact."

On April 12, 2019, six days after Evaldo's death, Bolsonaro commented on the case, saying, "The Army didn't kill anyone, no, the Army belongs to the people. We cannot accuse the people of being murderers, no. There was an incident, there was a death, we regret the death of the hardworking, honest citizen, the responsibility is being ascertained."

On the 18th, Luciano Macedo died as a result of shots fired by the military while trying to rescue Evaldo and his family. The musician was taken to Hospital Carlos Chagas, but he did not resist his injuries.

Two years after the homicide, Luciana Nogueira, Evaldo's widow, fears that the case will be forgotten and both she and her 10-year-old son (2021) are on antidepressants and psychological counseling.

== Trial ==
The trial in the Military Court was scheduled for April 7, 2021, but was postponed due to the COVID-19 pandemic in Rio de Janeiro, and was postponed to for October 13, 2021. Eight military personnel were sentenced to between 28 and 31 years in a closed prison regime in the early morning hours of October 14, 2021.
