= Marcelo Dascal =

Israeli philosopher and linguist (1940–2019)

- מרסלו דסקל
- Born: 1940; São Paulo, Brazil
- Died: April 15, 2019; Kiryat Ono, Israel
- Education: University of São Paulo (Philosophy and Electrical Engineering); Aix-en-Provence (Linguistics and Epistemology); Hebrew University of Jerusalem (Ph.D.)
- Occupations: Philosopher, Linguist
- Years active: 1967–2019
- Employer: Tel Aviv University
- Known for: Philosophy of language, Pragmatics, Study of controversies
- Notable work: Contributions to pragmatics and philosophy of language
- Title: Professor of Philosophy
- Board member of: President, New Israeli Philosophical Association; President, International Association for the Study of Controversies

Marcelo Dascal (Hebrew: מרסלו דסקל; 1940 in São Paulo – 15 April 2019 in Kiryat-Ono, Israel) was a Brazilian-born Israeli philosopher and linguist, who was a professor of philosophy at Tel Aviv University since 1967. He also served as Dean of the Lester and Sally Entin Faculty of Humanities from 1995 to 2000.

== Academic career ==
Marcelo Dascal graduated from a philosophy and electrical engineering faculty at the University of São Paulo, Brazil. He studied linguistics and epistemology in Aix-en-Provence (France) and obtained his Ph.D. at the Hebrew University of Jerusalem, under the supervision of Yehoshua Bar-Hillel.

In Israel he became a teacher at the Hebrew University of Jerusalem and Ben-Gurion University of the Negev. At this university he founded and led the Department of Philosophy. Starting from 1967 he taught at Tel Aviv University, where he became a full professor in 1991.

Abroad, he taught at different well-known educational institutions such as the University of São Paulo, Brasília, Campinas and Unisinos (Brazil), Lisboa (Portugal), Lugano (Switzerland), Massachusetts (Amherst), California (Berkeley), Monash (Melbourne, Australia), UNAM and UAM (Mexico), Ecole des Hautes Etudes en Sciences Sociales (Paris), Université de la Sorbonne Nouvelle (Paris III), Università degli Studi di Bologna (Italy), and others.

In addition to his undergraduate teaching, he supervised thirteen completed Ph.D. dissertations.

He took part in many scientific meetings all around the world, often being invited as a keynote speaker.

He was a member of the board of many scientific associations and journals and the President of the New Israeli Philosophical Association and of the International Association for the Study of Controversies.

He held research positions at the universities of Indiana, Stuttgart, Bochum, Technische Univ. Berlin, UNED (Madrid) and the Centre d'Etudes de la Philosophie Moderne (CNRS, Paris), and conducted research on the pragmatics of native languages in the Amazon area. In 1985–1986 he was a Fellow of the Netherlands Institute of Advanced Studies (Wassenaar) and in 1994–1995 he was a Fellow of the Institute for Advanced Studies, The Hebrew University of Jerusalem. In the winter term of 2002/3, he was granted the Leibniz Professorship at the Institute for Advanced Studies of Leipzig University (Germany), where he was the first Leibniz scholar to hold this position.

== Research areas ==
In 1995/6 Dascal coordinated in Jerusalem an international research project called "Leibniz the Polemicist", which was aimed to find new ways to develop an understanding of the importance of debate in shaping knowledge. It was inspired in Leibniz's eclectic and pluralistic approach, according to which knowledge arises out of the synthesis of the "grains of truth" present in every doctrine, a synthesis that is to be achieved through rational controversy governed by a notion of rationality not reducible to logical deduction and yet not arbitrary. One of the results of this project was the creation of the International Association for the Study of Controversies (IASC, read I ASK). The association has conducted since 1996 yearly workshops and conferences.

Another result was a joint German-Israeli research project on the evolution of scientific, philosophical and theological controversies in the 17th and 18th centuries. This project received a three-year grant (1999–2001) from the German-Israeli Foundation. It was conducted by a team of ten Israeli and German Post-Doctoral and Doctoral researchers, and published four reports.

Dascal has published several articles on the topic, and co-founded (along with Gerd Fritz) a new book series called "Controversies", whose first three volumes were published in 2005.

=== Leibniz and the history of modern philosophy ===
Dascal was a Leibniz scholar. He published La Sémiologie de Leibniz (Paris, 1978), Leibniz: Language, Signs and Thought (Amsterdam, 1987), and co-edited Leibniz and Adam (Tel Aviv, 1991) which was selected by the Leibniz Gesellschaft as a special gift for its members. He published many articles on Leibniz, his contemporaries, and his influence. Dascal was co-founder of the Israel Leibniz Association (in Hebrew: Agudat Leibniz Israel) and a member of the Leibniz Association of America and of the Leibniz Gesellschaft.

In his earlier work, Dascal focused mainly on Leibniz's philosophy of language, and established the now accepted view that natural languages and other semiotic systems play, for Leibniz, a crucial role in our mental life, and therefore cannot be overlooked in understanding his epistemology. In his last work, Dascal emphasised the fact that, alongside Leibniz's well known and advertised idea of a formal semiotic system, the "Universal Characteristic", which would be the ideal tool for human cognition, based on a strictly deductive or "calculation" model of rationality, Leibniz was also concerned with those aspects of rational thought and action which were not accountable for in terms of such a model. Accordingly, he developed a model of what came to be known later as "soft" rationality. Dascal conducted intensive research on this rather underestimated aspect of Leibniz's rationalism.

=== Theory of Controversies ===
Dascal considered the study of polemic exchanges a neglected element of historical and philosophical discourses. His contribution, termed Theory of Controversies employed a tripartite categorization: 1. a relatively peaceful Discussion that occurs within a joint framework and terminate upon the discovery of an error made by one side (or both). 2. a heated Dispute, typified by the lack of a joint framework and a focus on the achievement of a 'victory,' that often ends with better understanding of 'borderlines.' 3. a long, inconclusive Controversy when the parties challenge each other's patterns of thought but also respect them, leading to discoveries and innovations.

DOne of the upshots of this project has been the creation of the International Association for the Study of Controversies (IASC, read I ASK). The Association has conducted since 1996 yearly workshops and conferences.

=== Philosophy of language, pragmatics and cognitive science ===
In the philosophy of language, Dascal's work focused on the theory of language use, i.e., pragmatics. He contributed both to sociopragmatics and to psychopragmatics (a concept he created), as well as securing a proper philosophical foundation for these two branches and for their distinction from other components of a theory of meaning. His contributions to the cognitive sciences are closely related with his work on the mental use of language.

He published Pragmatics and the Philosophy of Mind (Amsterdam, 1983), and edited the relevant volume of the Enciclopedia IberoAmericana de Filosofia, (Madrid, 1999) and Misunderstanding (a special issue of the Journal of Pragmatics, 1999). He also co-edited the trilingual, two volume, two-thousand page Philosophy of Language: A Handbook of Contemporary Research (Berlin, 1992, 1995), and, more recently; Negotiation and Power in Dialogic Interaction. A Portuguese translation of his book Interpretation and Understanding (2003) was published in 2006.

In order to foster the study of the relationship between the use of language (and other semiotic systems) and cognition (and other kinds of mental life) Dascal founded and edited the interdisciplinary journal Pragmatics & Cognition (Amsterdam). Since 2005, the journal publishes an annual Special Issue devoted to Cognition & Technology.

== Personal life ==
He lived in Israel since 1965. He was married to Varda. They had 3 children - Hagit, Shlomit and Tamar and eight grandchildren - Adi, Lior, Ohad, Noga, Jonathan, Gilead, Almog, and Naomi. .

== Published works ==
- Interpretation and Understanding, Philadelphia: John Bejamins, 2003
