= São Miguel dos Milagres =

Municipality of Alagoas, Brazil

- Municipality of Alagoas, Brazil
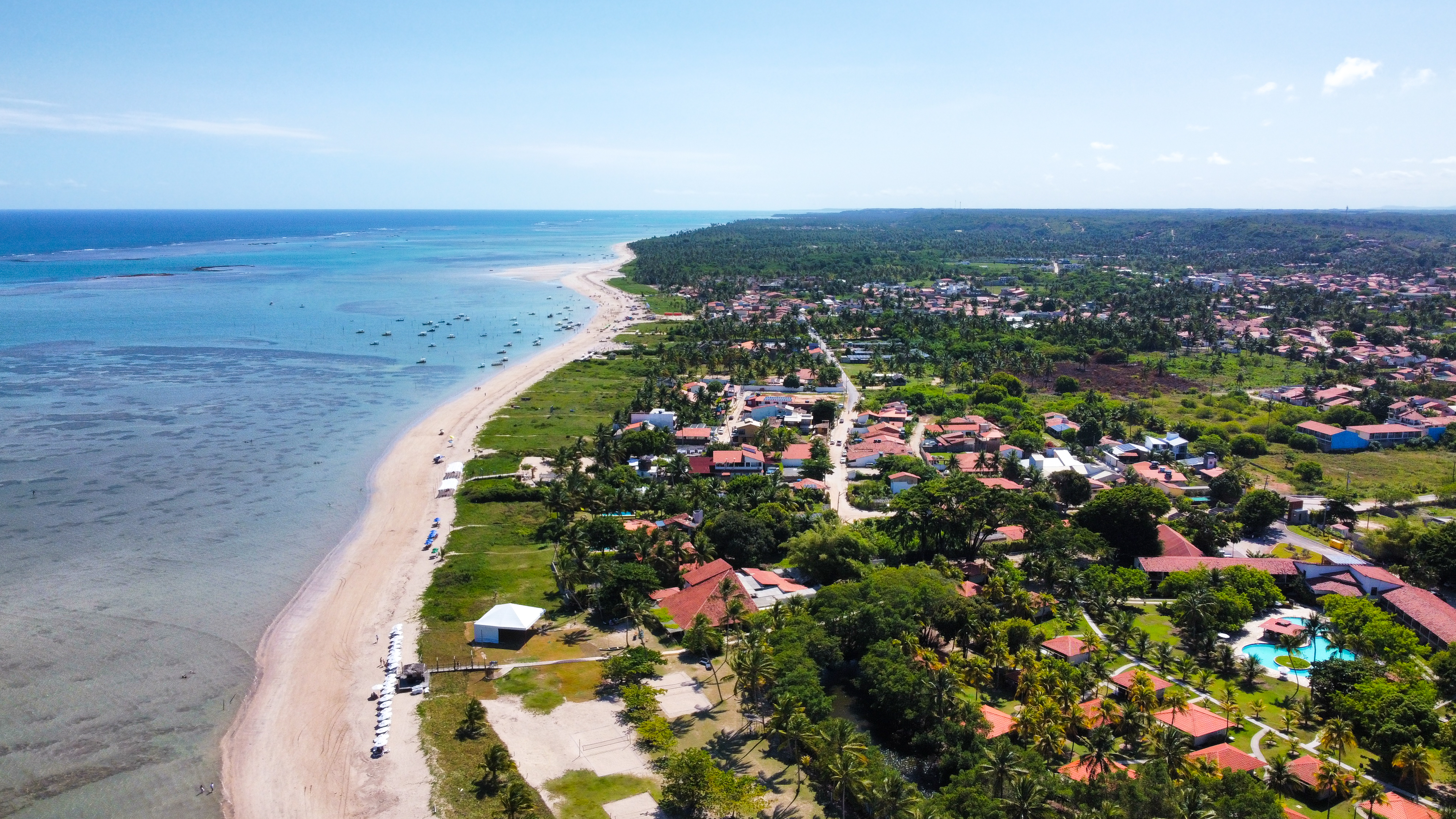
- Aerial view of the hotel area of Porto da Rua in São Miguel dos Milagres

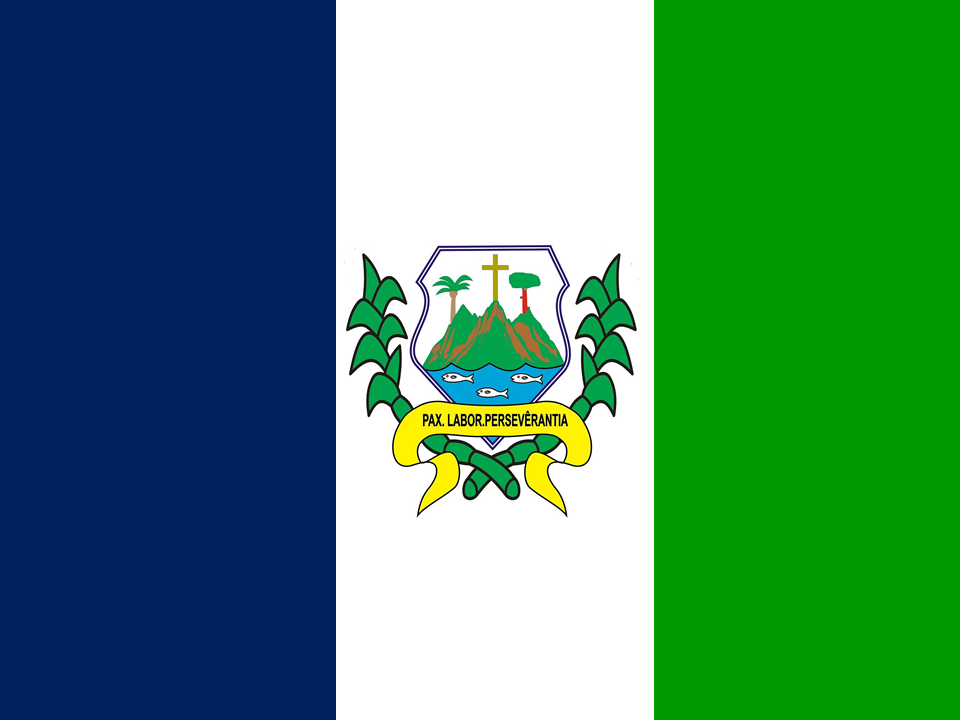
- Flag
- Etymology: Means in Brazilian Portuguese "Saint Michael of Miracles", named after Saint Michael the Archangel whose statue was found by a fisherman on a beach which had purported healing powers
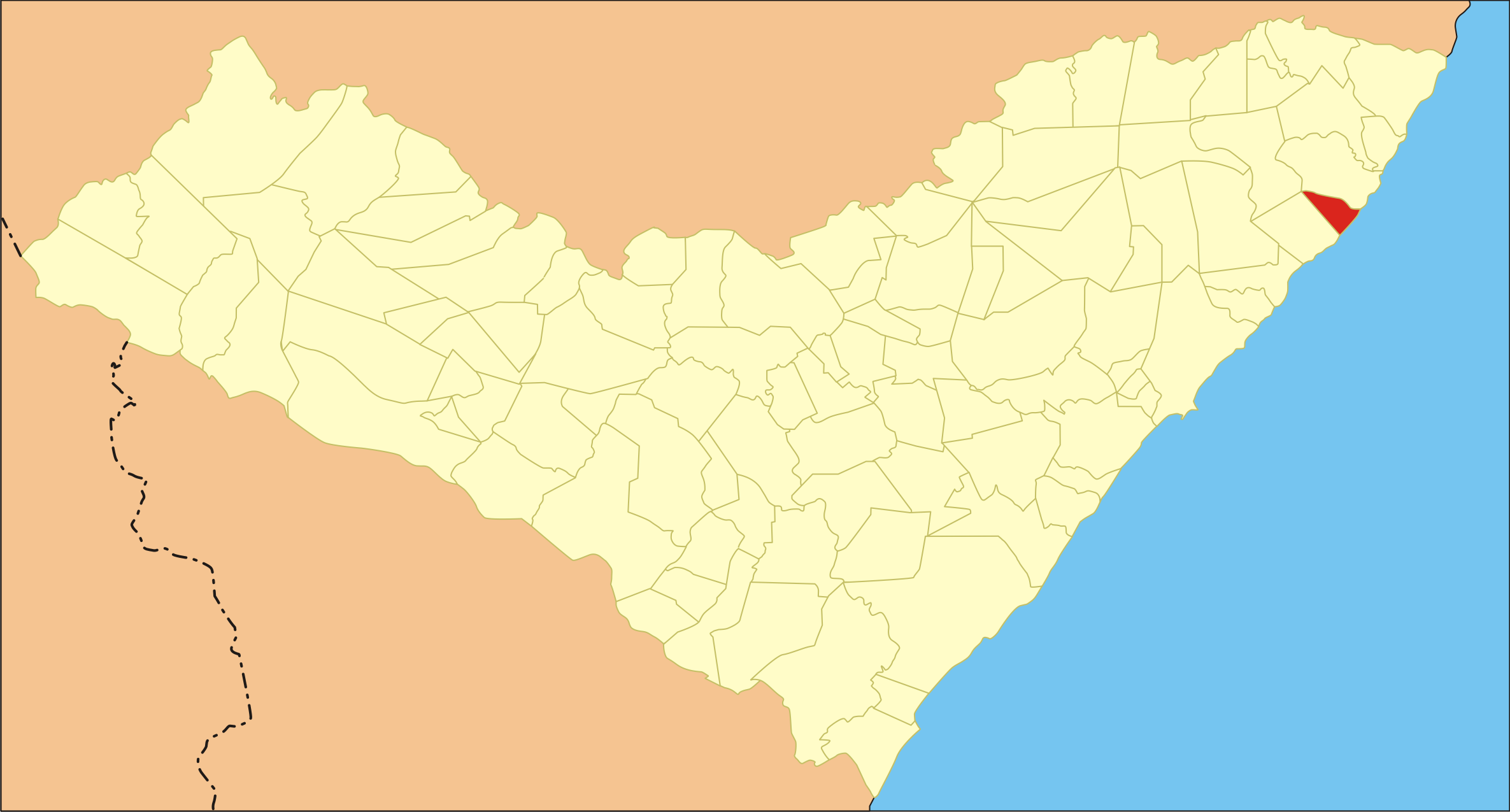
- Location of São Miguel dos Milagres in Alagoas

- Location within Brazil Location within South America
- Coordinates: 9°15′57″S 35°22′22″W
- Country: Brazil
- Region: Northeast
- State: Alagoas
- Founded: 7 June 1960

Government
  - Mayor: Jadson Lessa dos Santos (MDB) (2025-2028)
  - Vice Mayor: Jario Antonio dos Santos (PDT) (2025-2028)

Area
  - Total: 76.731 km^{2} (29.626 sq mi)
- Elevation: 5 m (16 ft)

Population (2022)
  - Total: 8,482
  - Density: 110.54/km^{2} (286.3/sq mi)
- Demonym: Milagrense or Miguelense (Brazilian Portuguese)
- Time zone: UTC-03:00 (Brasília Time)
- Postal code: 57940-000
- HDI (2010): 0.591 – medium
- Website: saomigueldosmilagres.al.gov.br

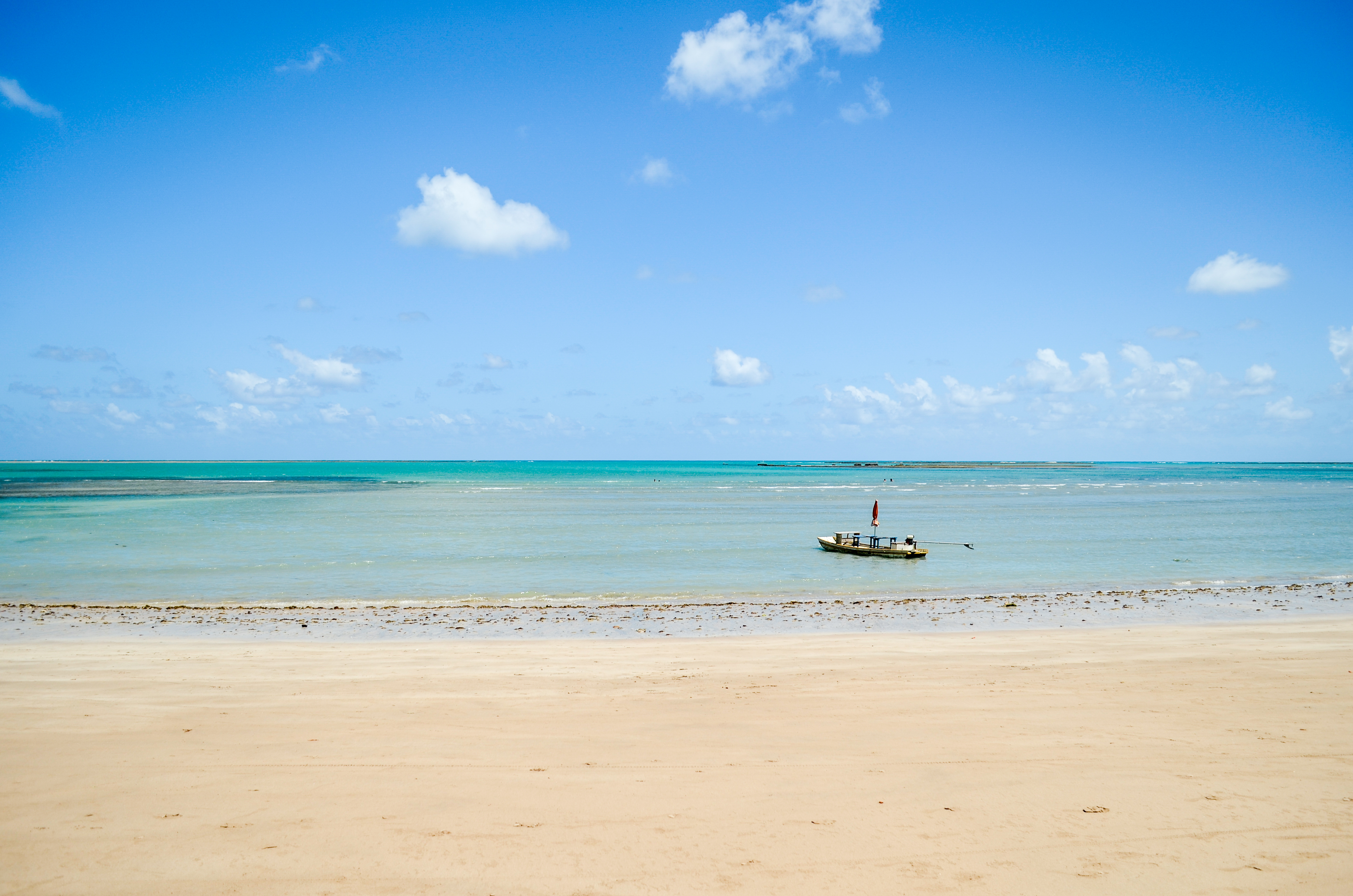
Sāo Miguel dos Milagres

São Miguel dos Milagres (Central northeastern portuguese pronunciation: [ˈsɐ̃w miˈɡɛw ˈdʊɦ miˈlɐɡɾi]) is a municipality located in the northern coast of the Brazilian state of Alagoas. Its population was 8,013 (2020) and its area is 65 km^{2} (25 sq mi).

== Gallery ==
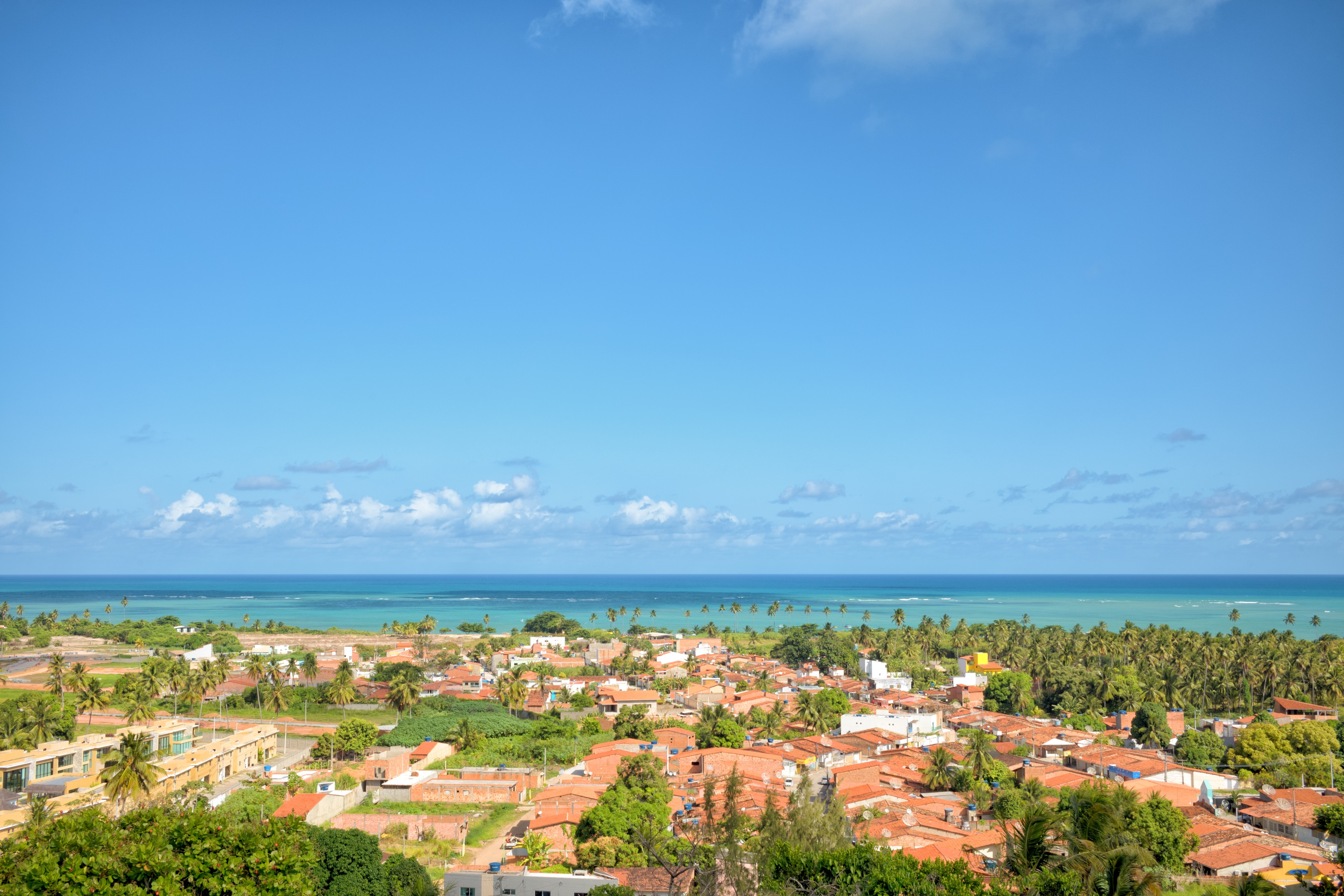
Aerial view of São Miguel dos Milagres from a scenic lookout

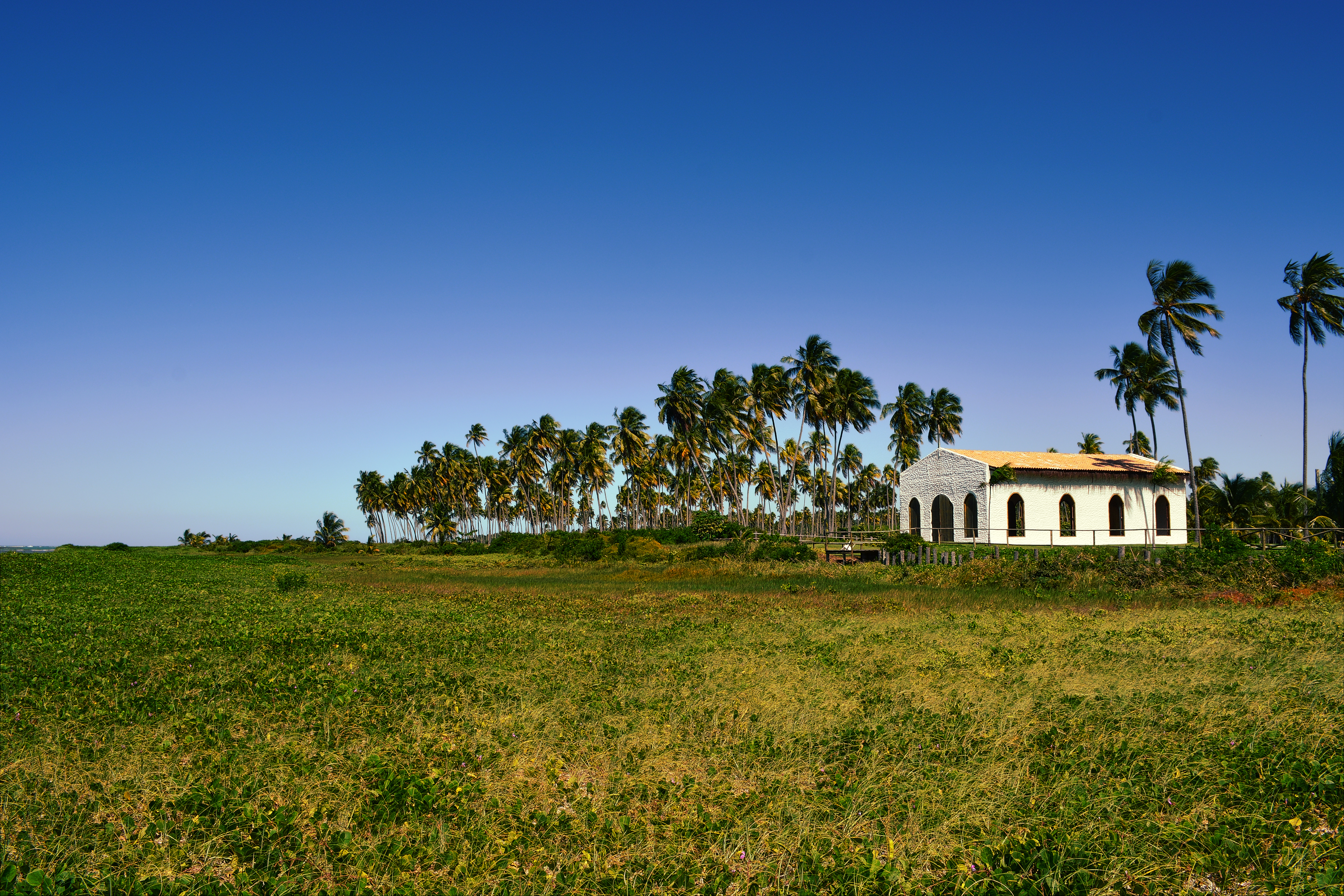
Milagres Chapel

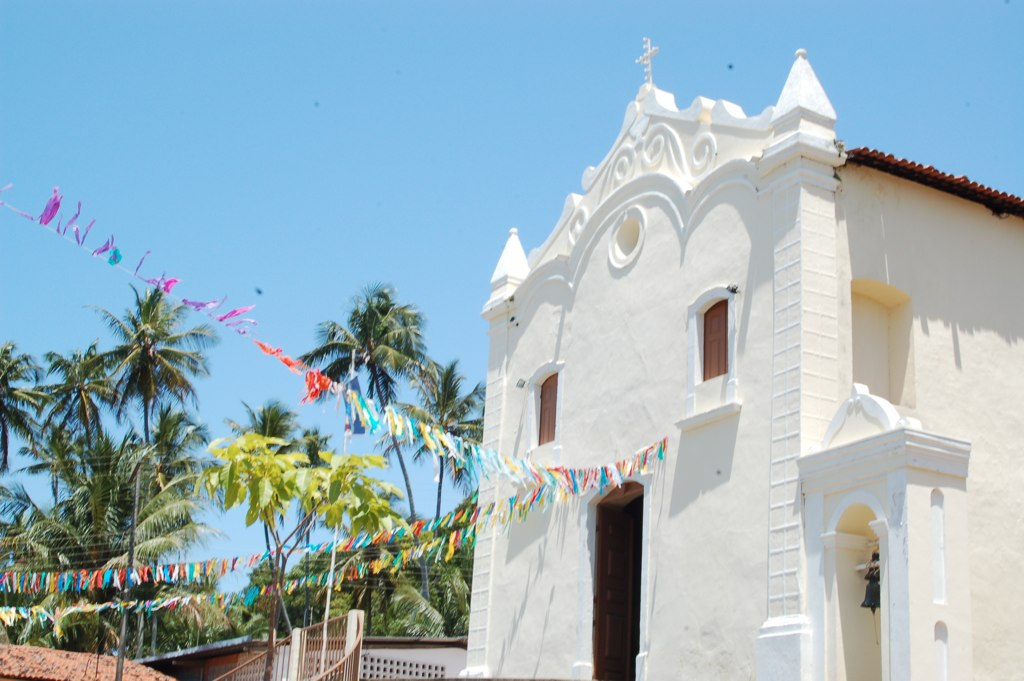
Parish of Our Lady Mother of the People Church

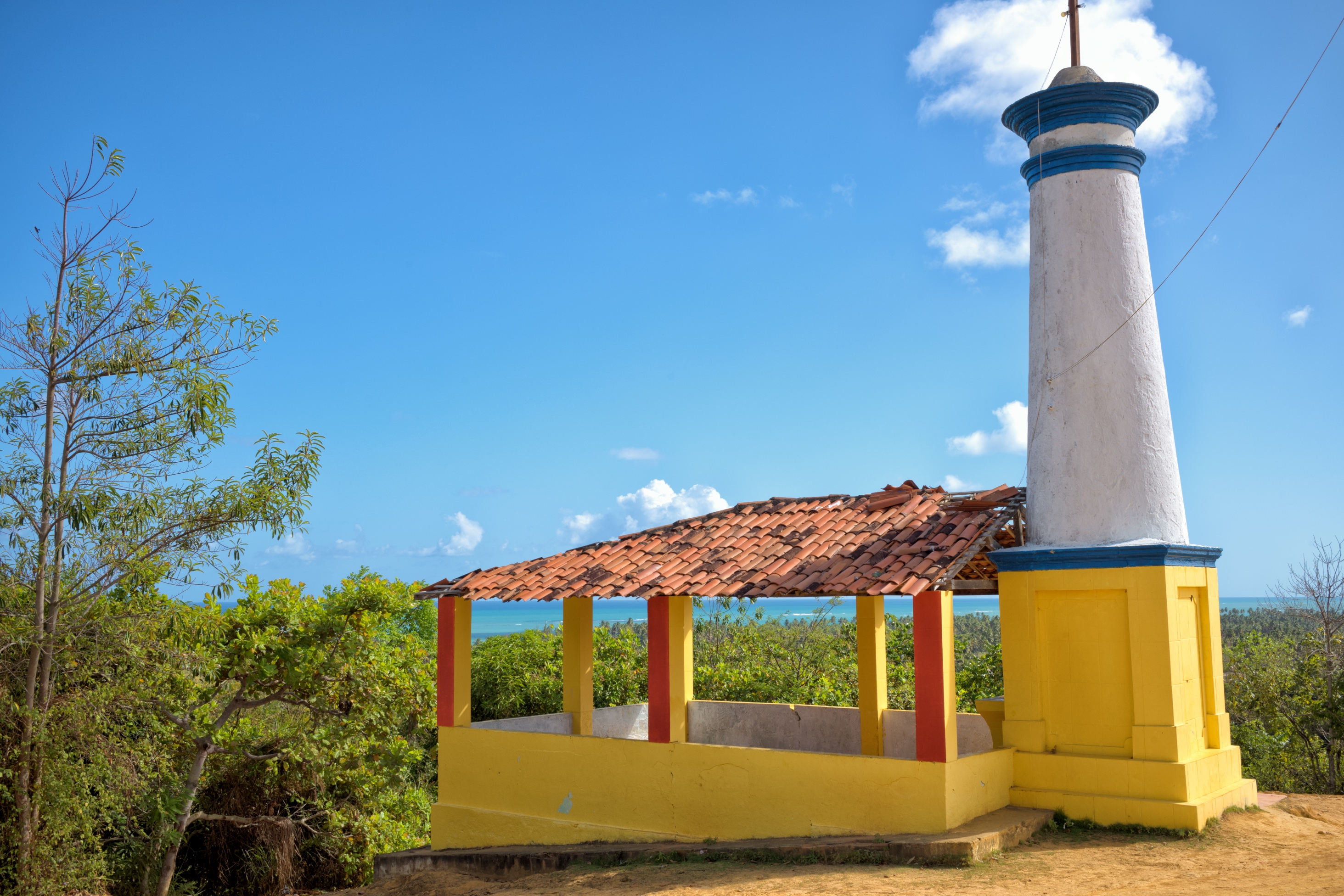
Cruzeiro Scenic Lookout

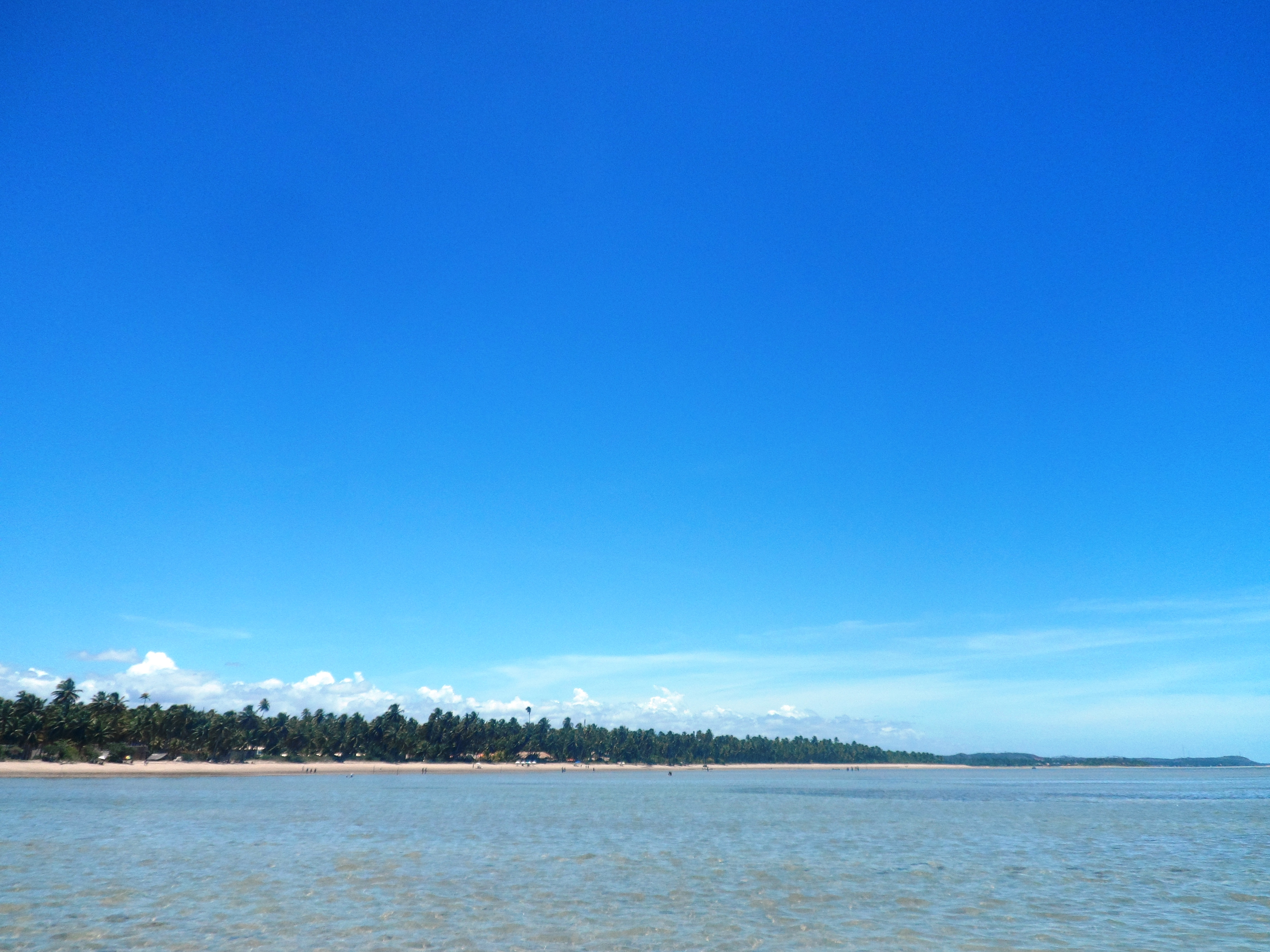
Beach in São Miguel dos Milagres

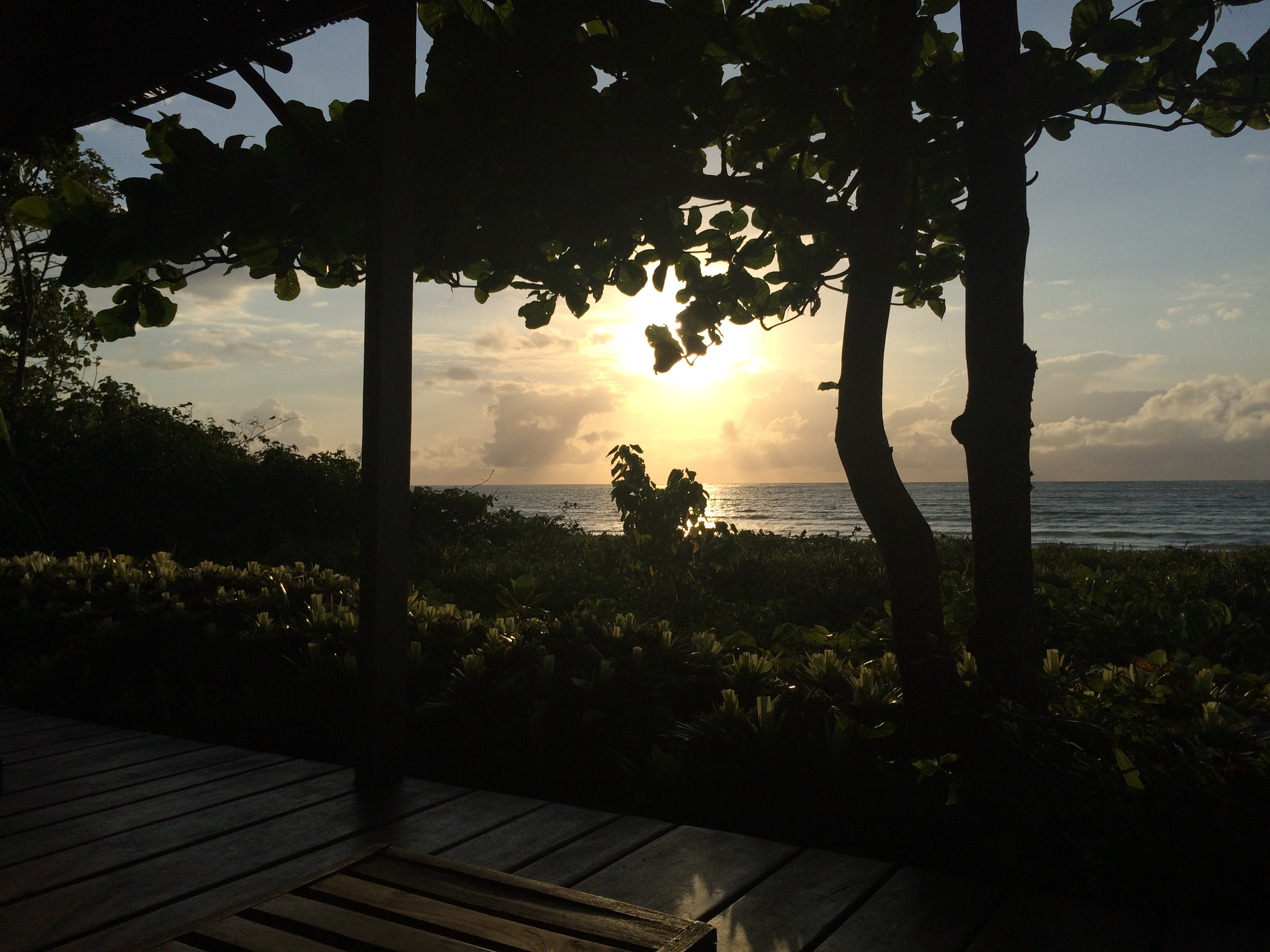
Sunrise in São Miguel dos Milagres

São Miguel dos Milagres Beach

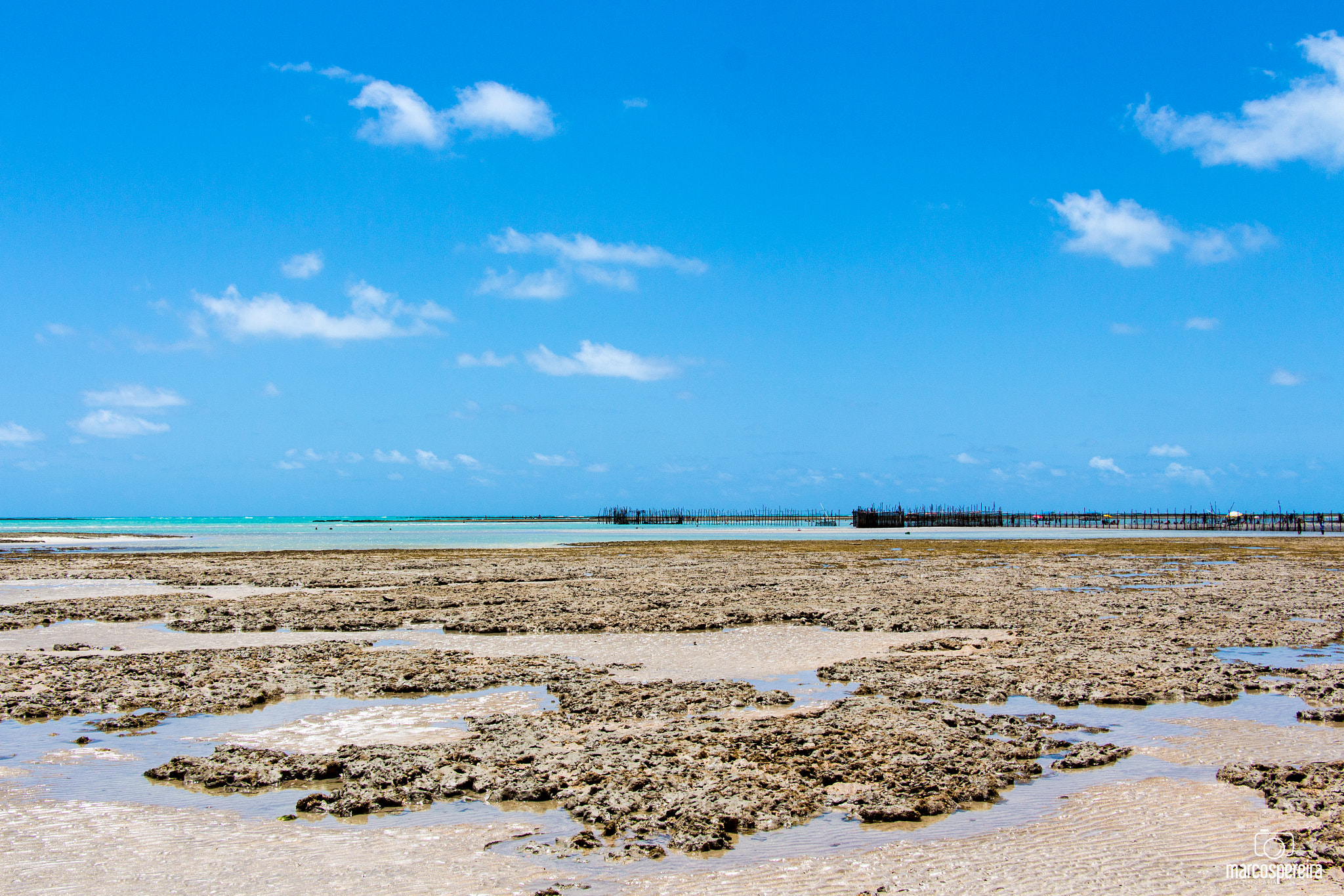
São Miguel dos Milagres Beach

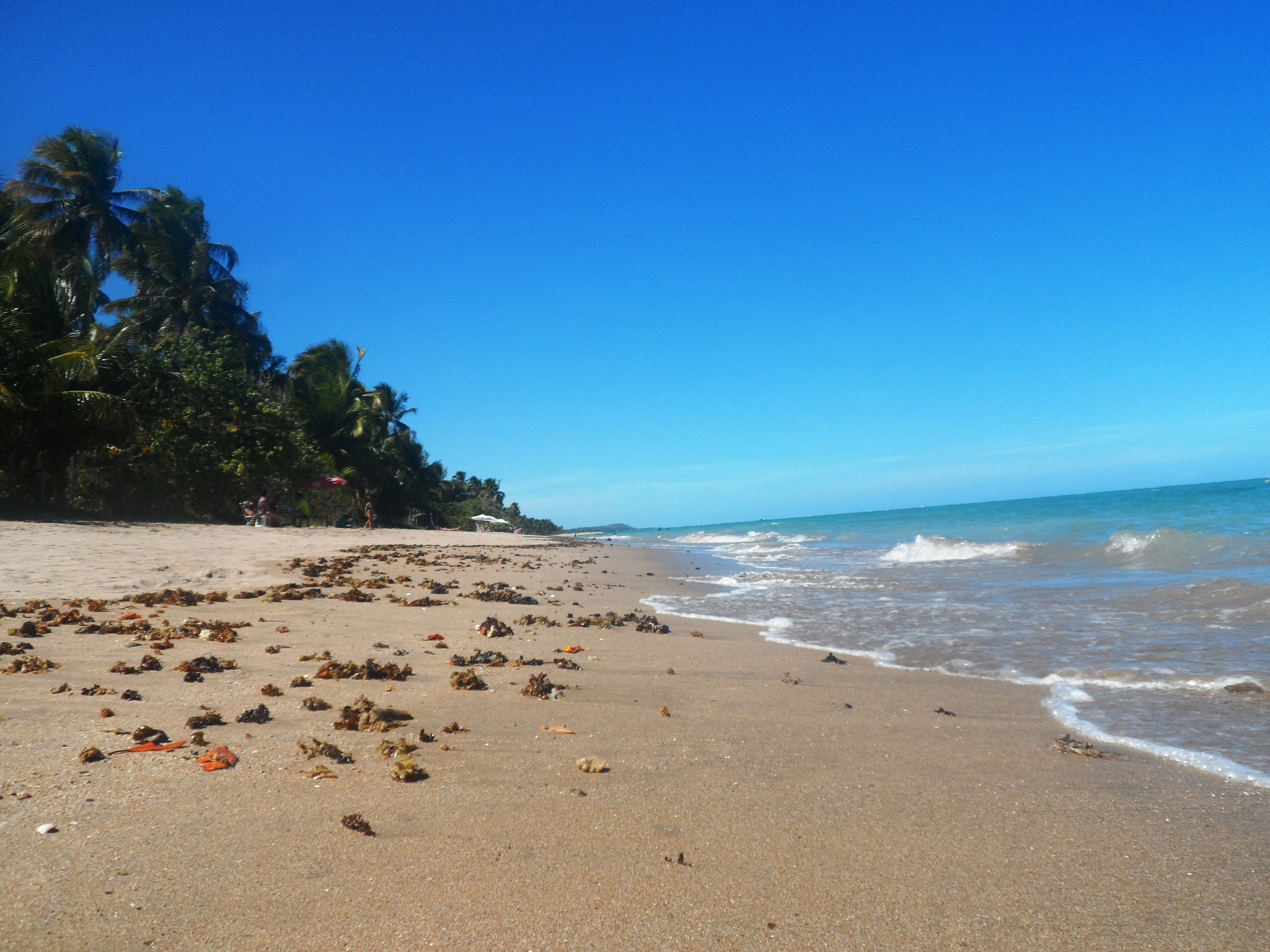
Beach in São Miguel dos Milagres

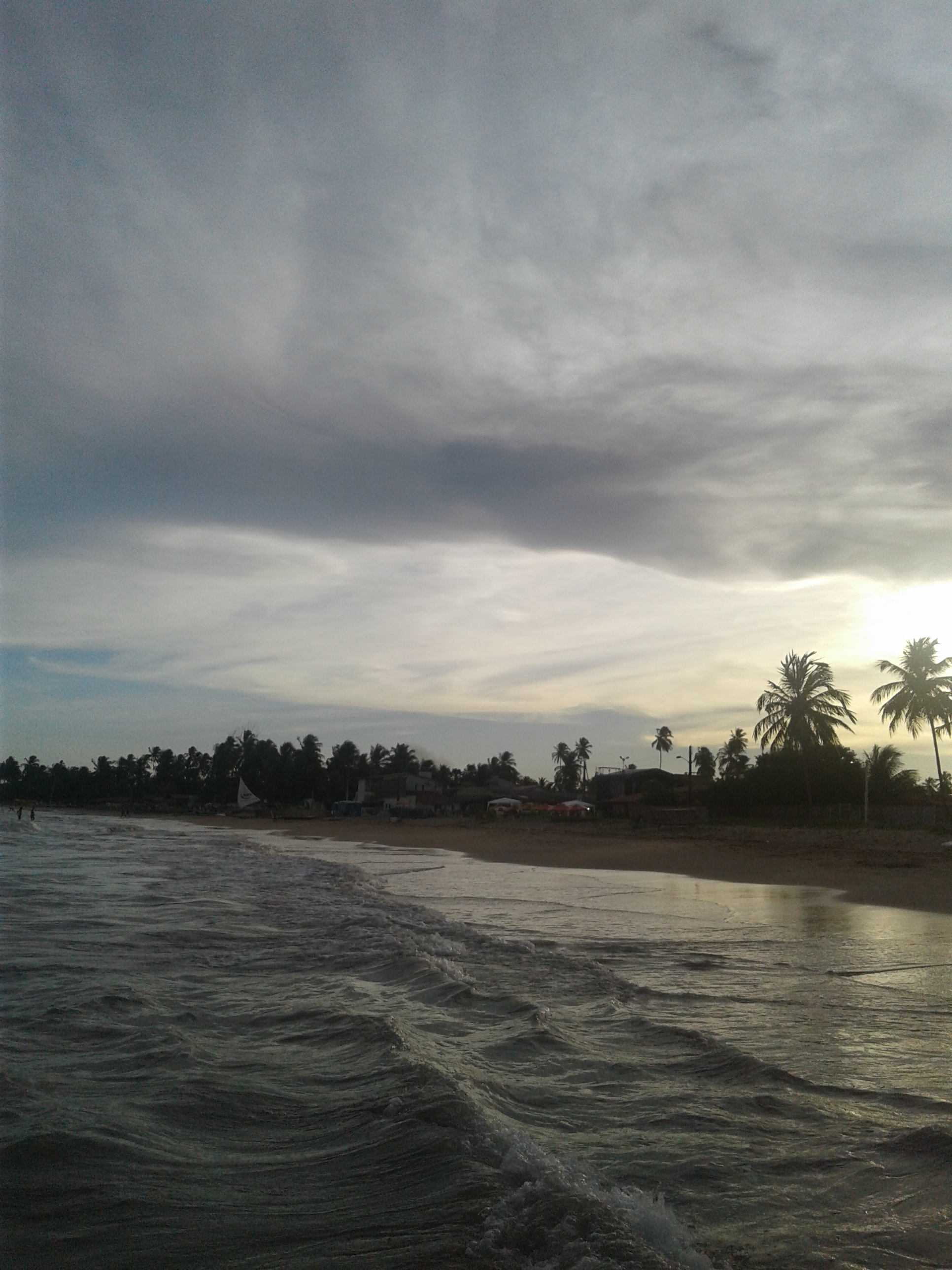
Beach in São Miguel dos Milagres

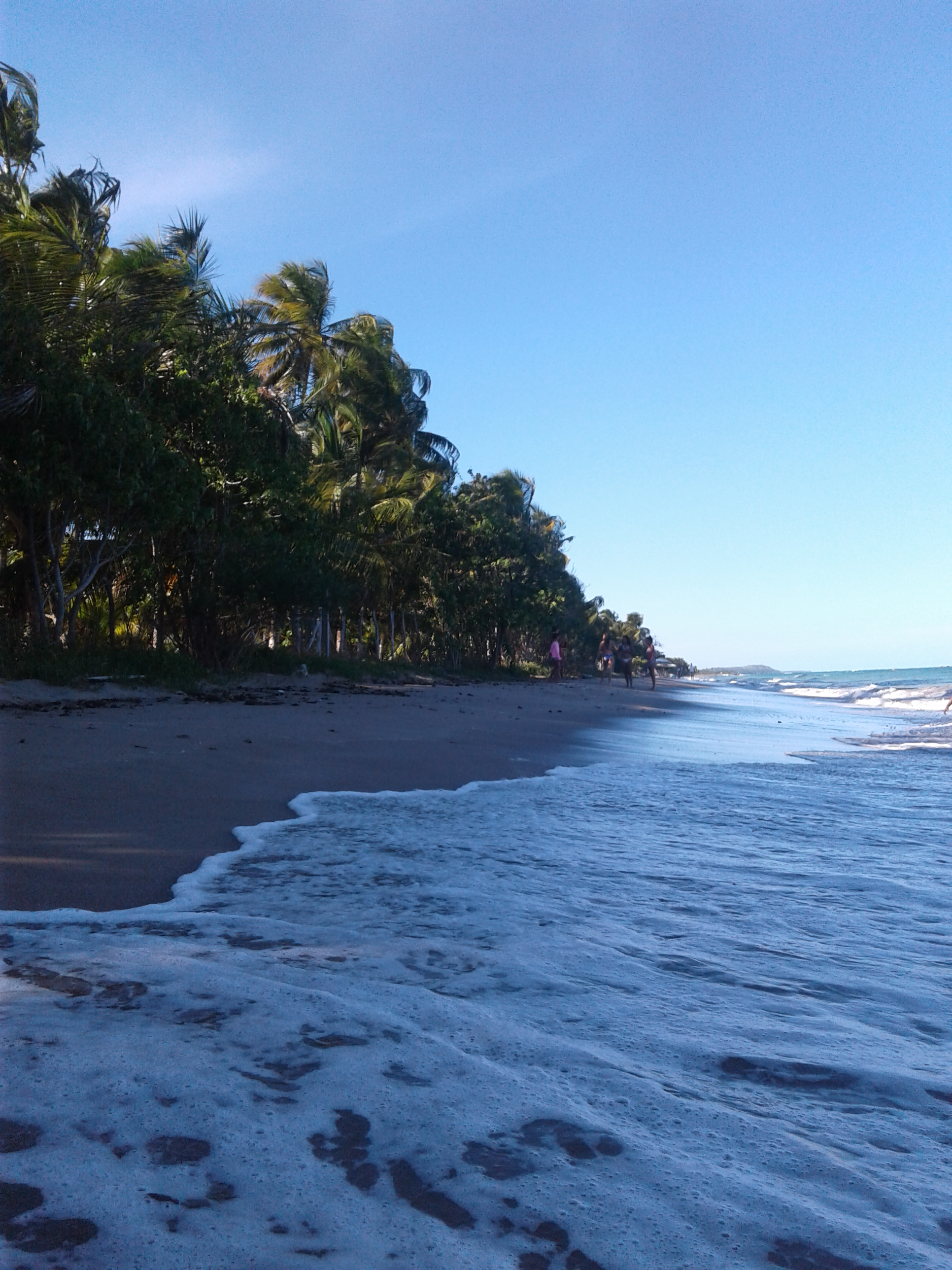
Beach in São Miguel dos Milagres

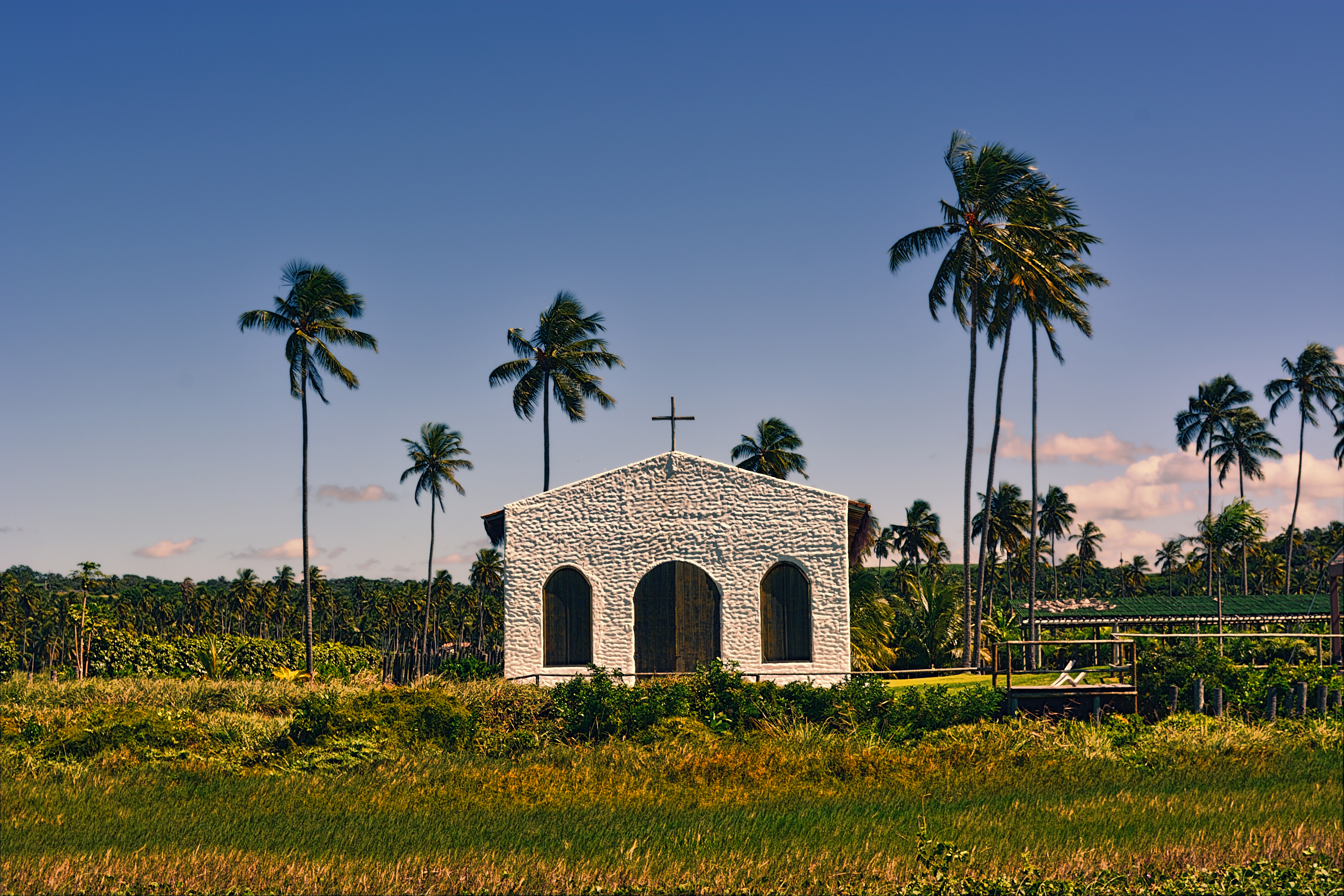
Milagres Chapel

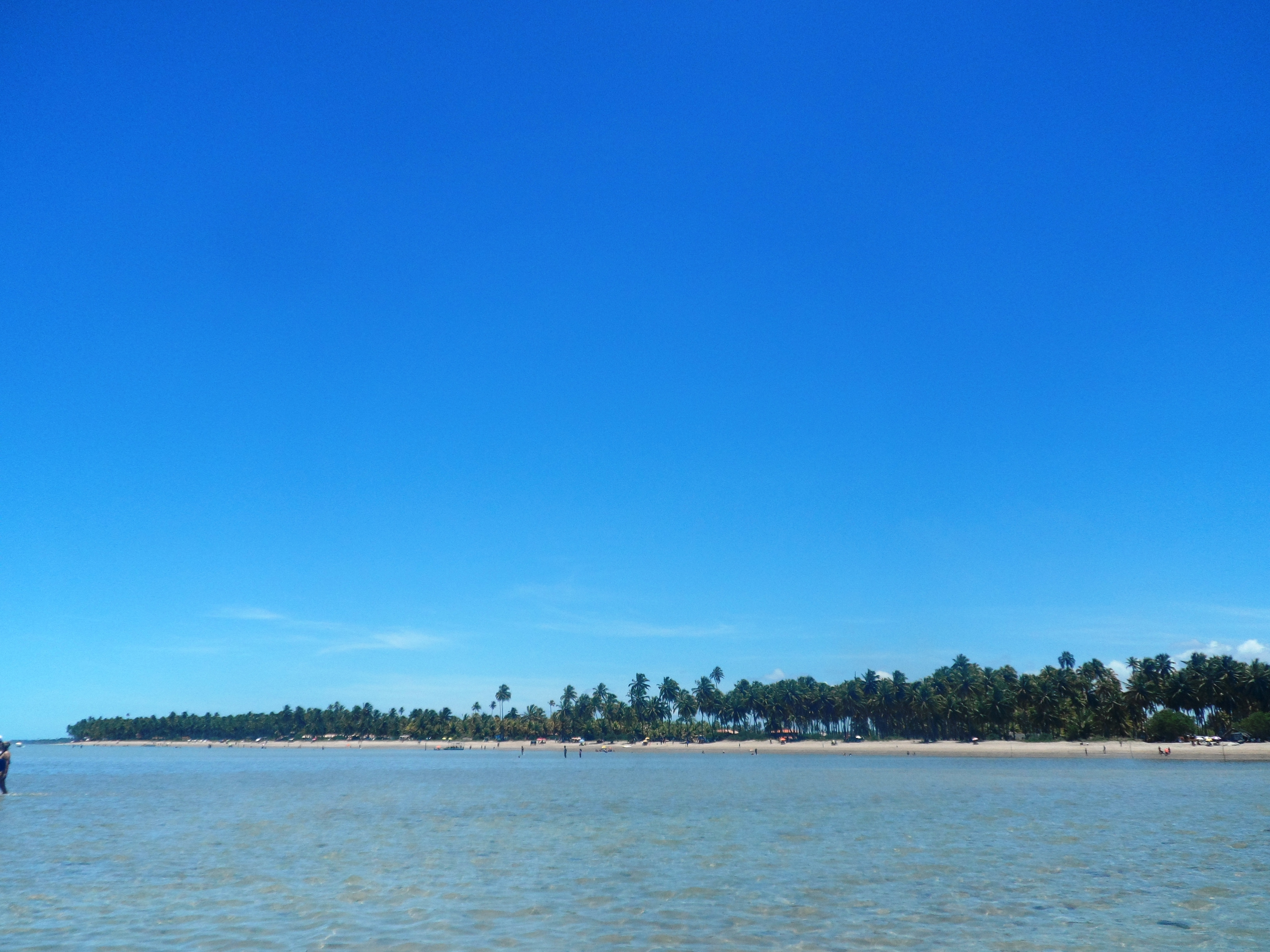
Porto da Rua Beach

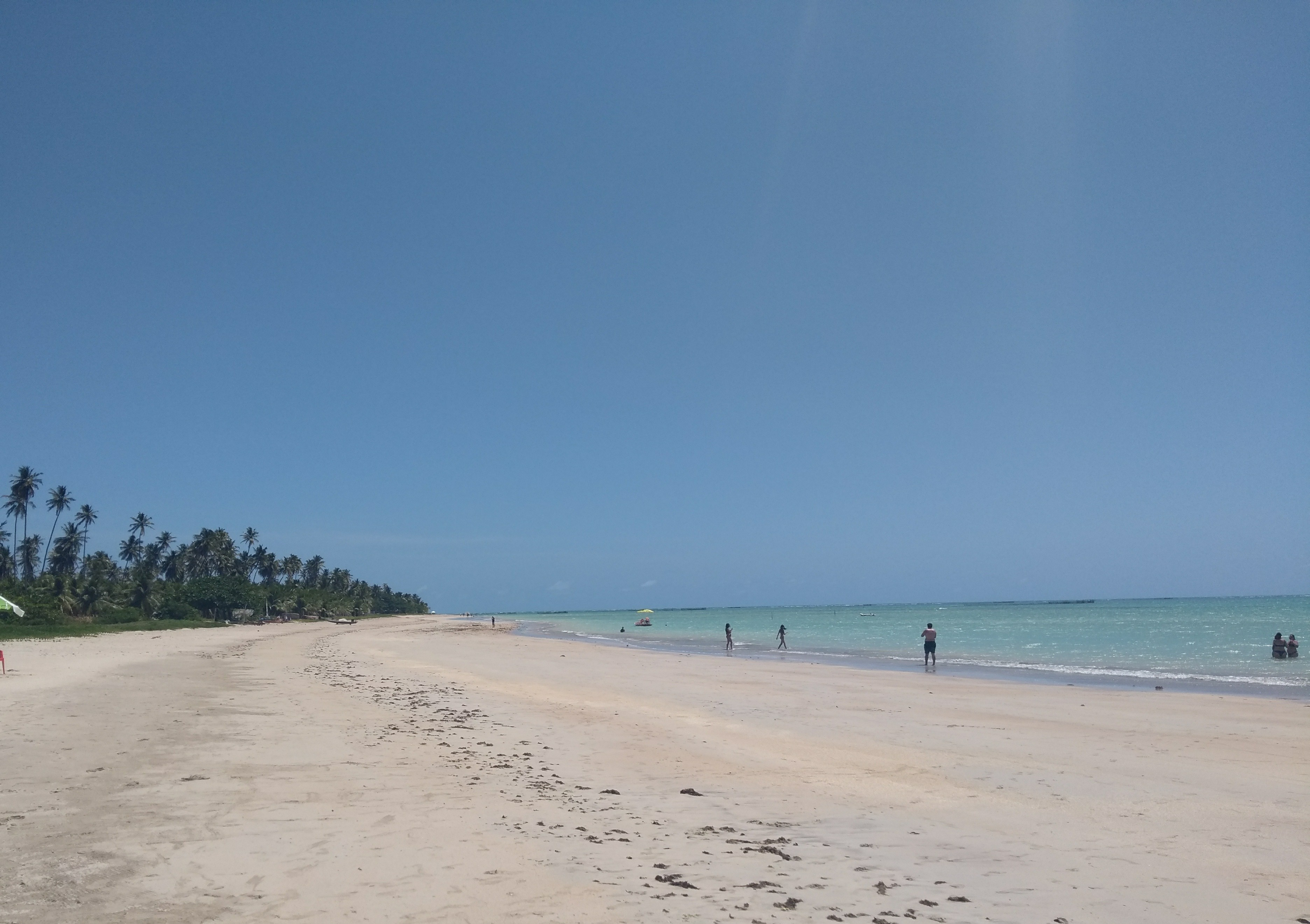
Riacho Beach

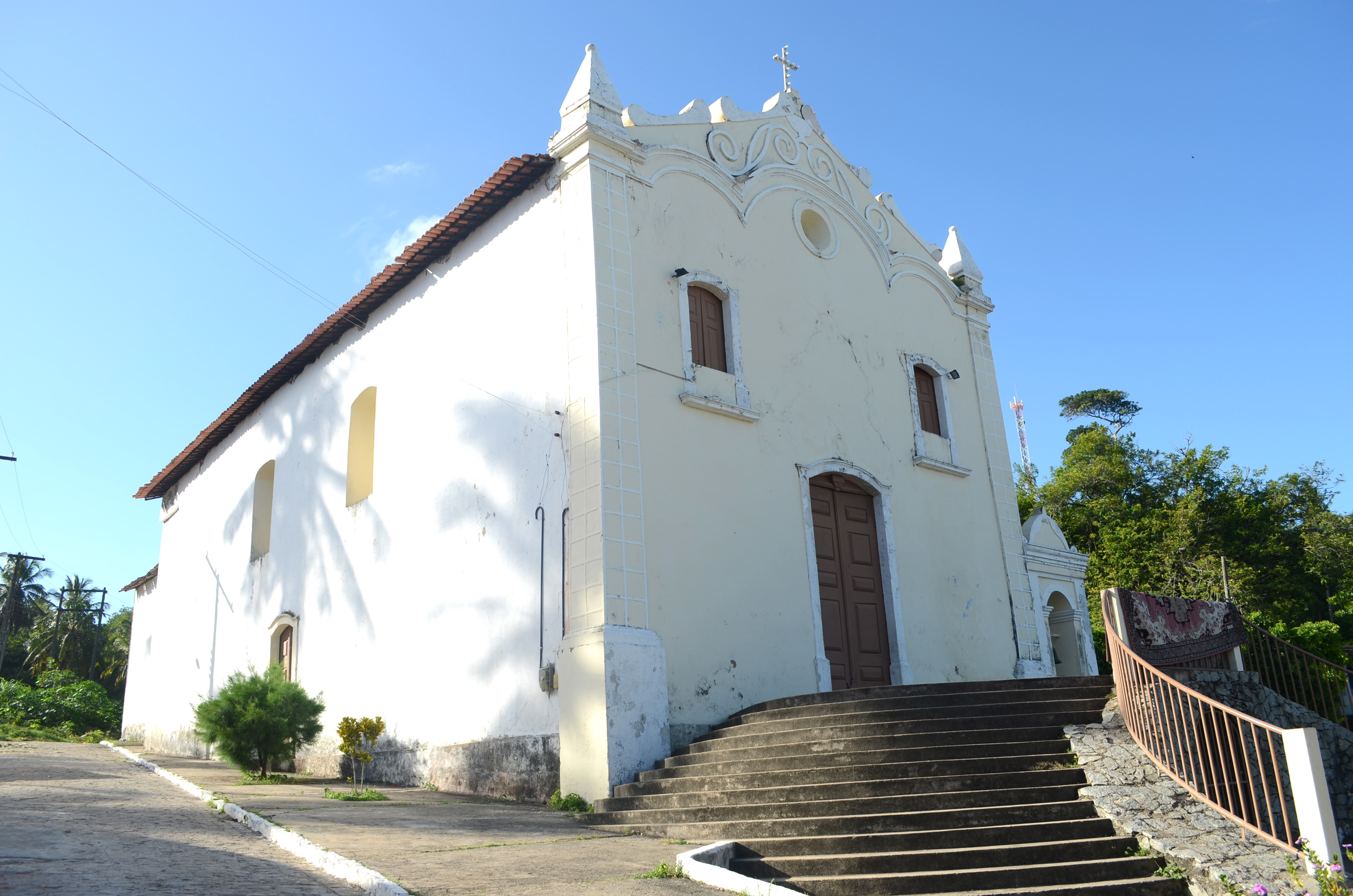
Parish of Our Lady Mother of the People Church

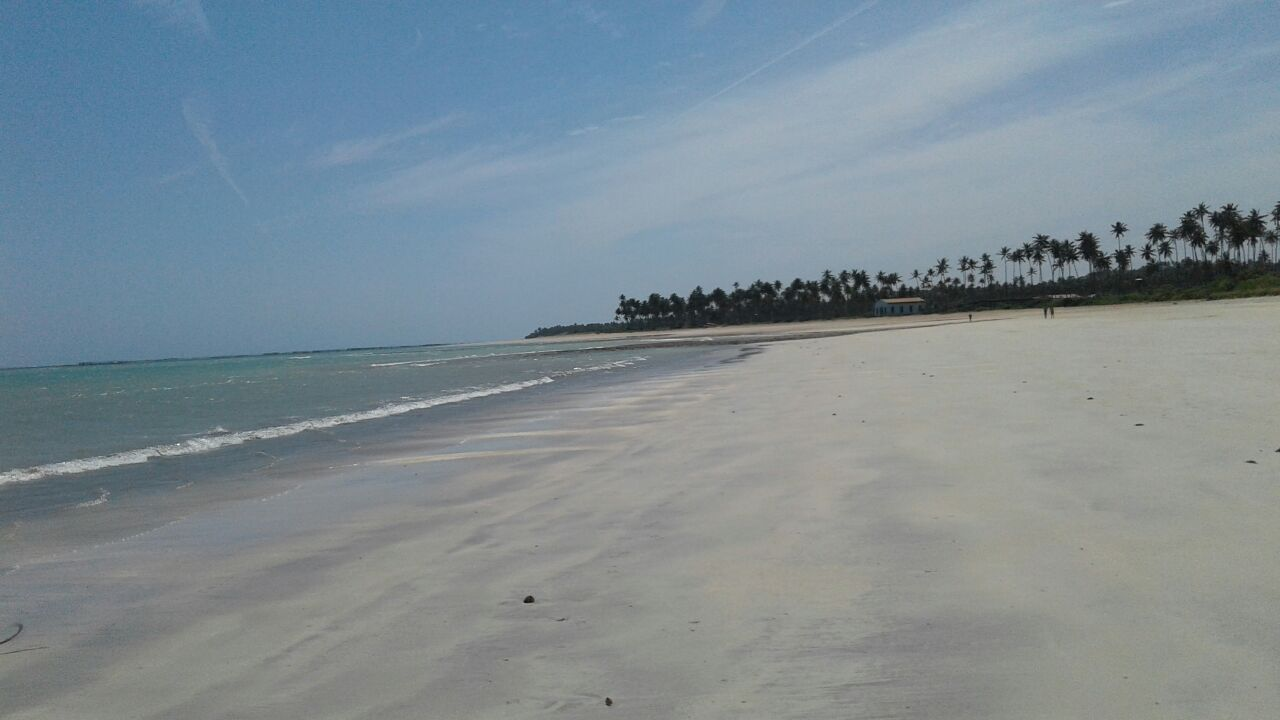
Riacho Beach

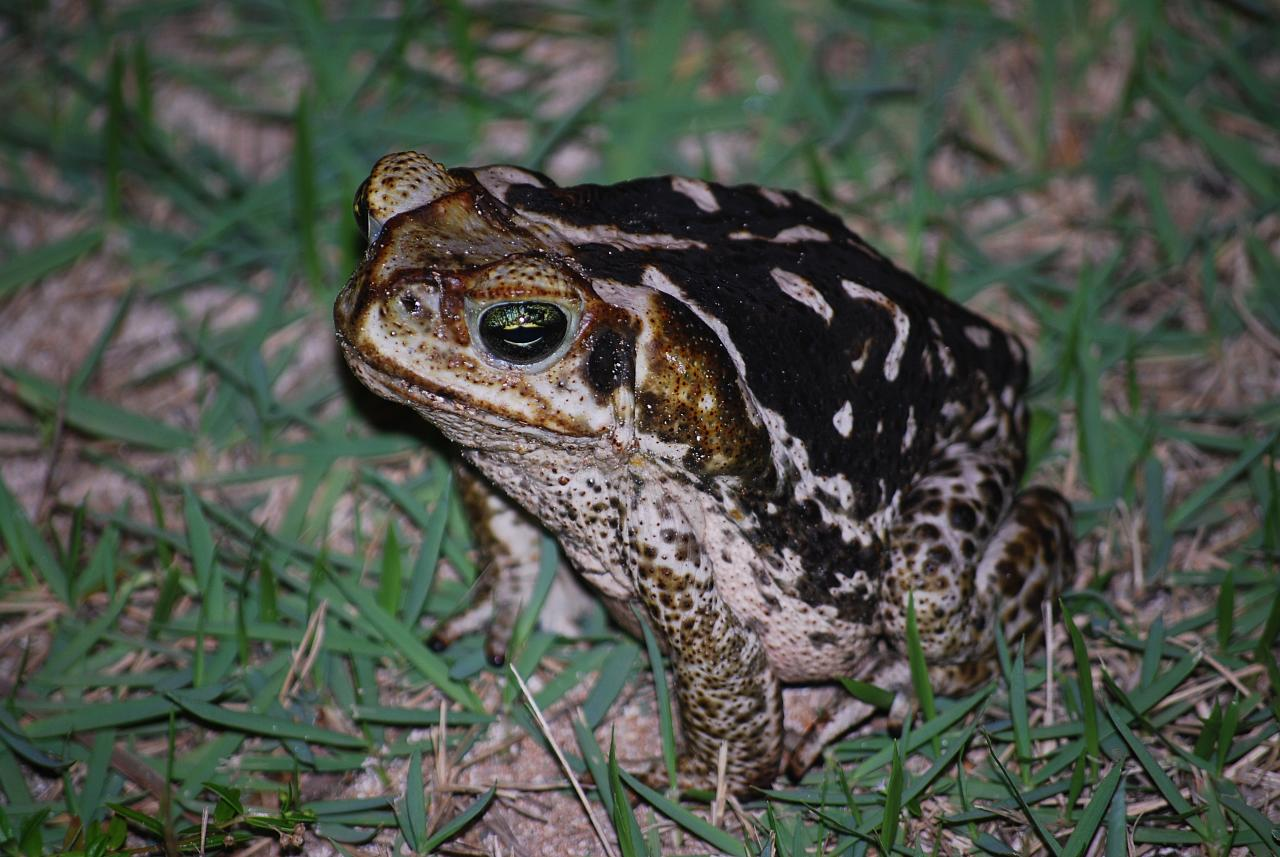
Frog or toad in São Miguel dos Milagres

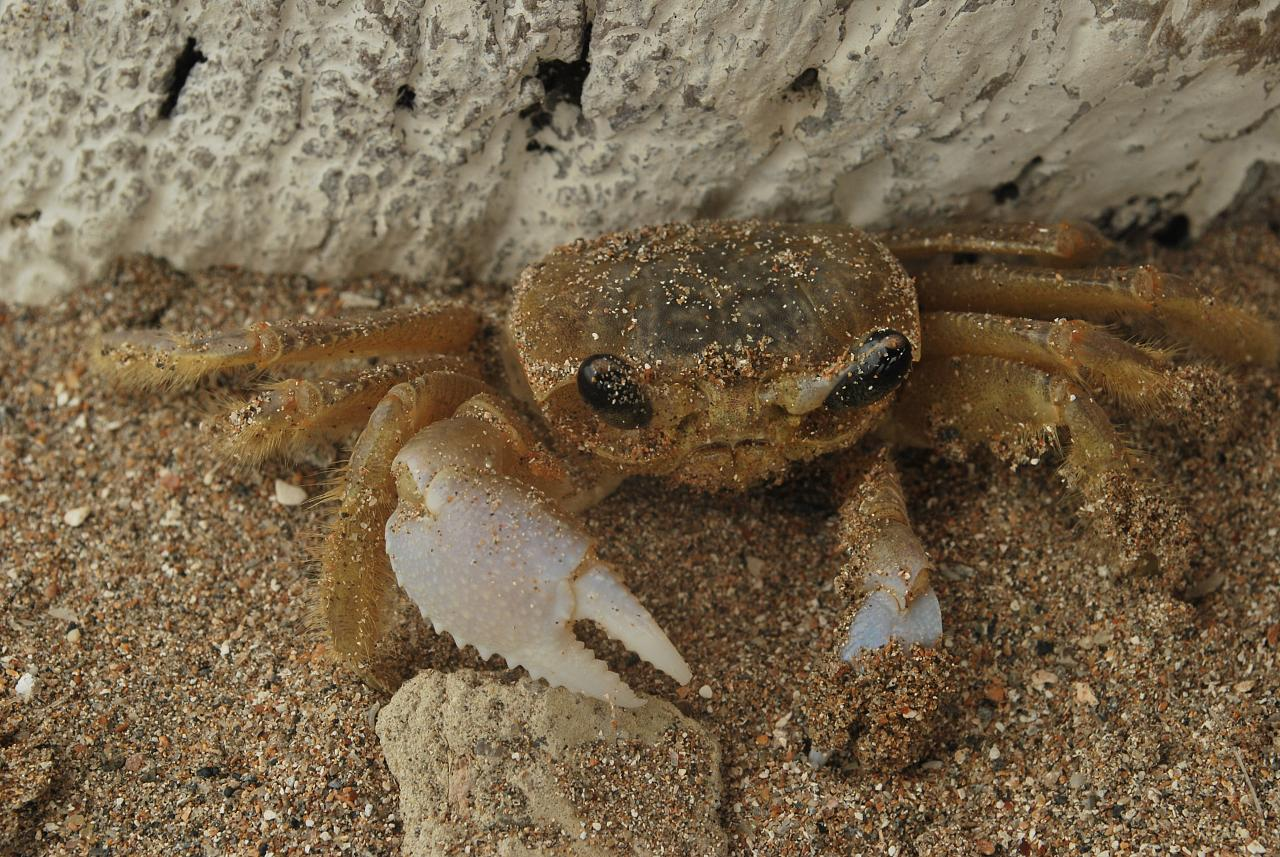
Crab in São Miguel dos Milagres

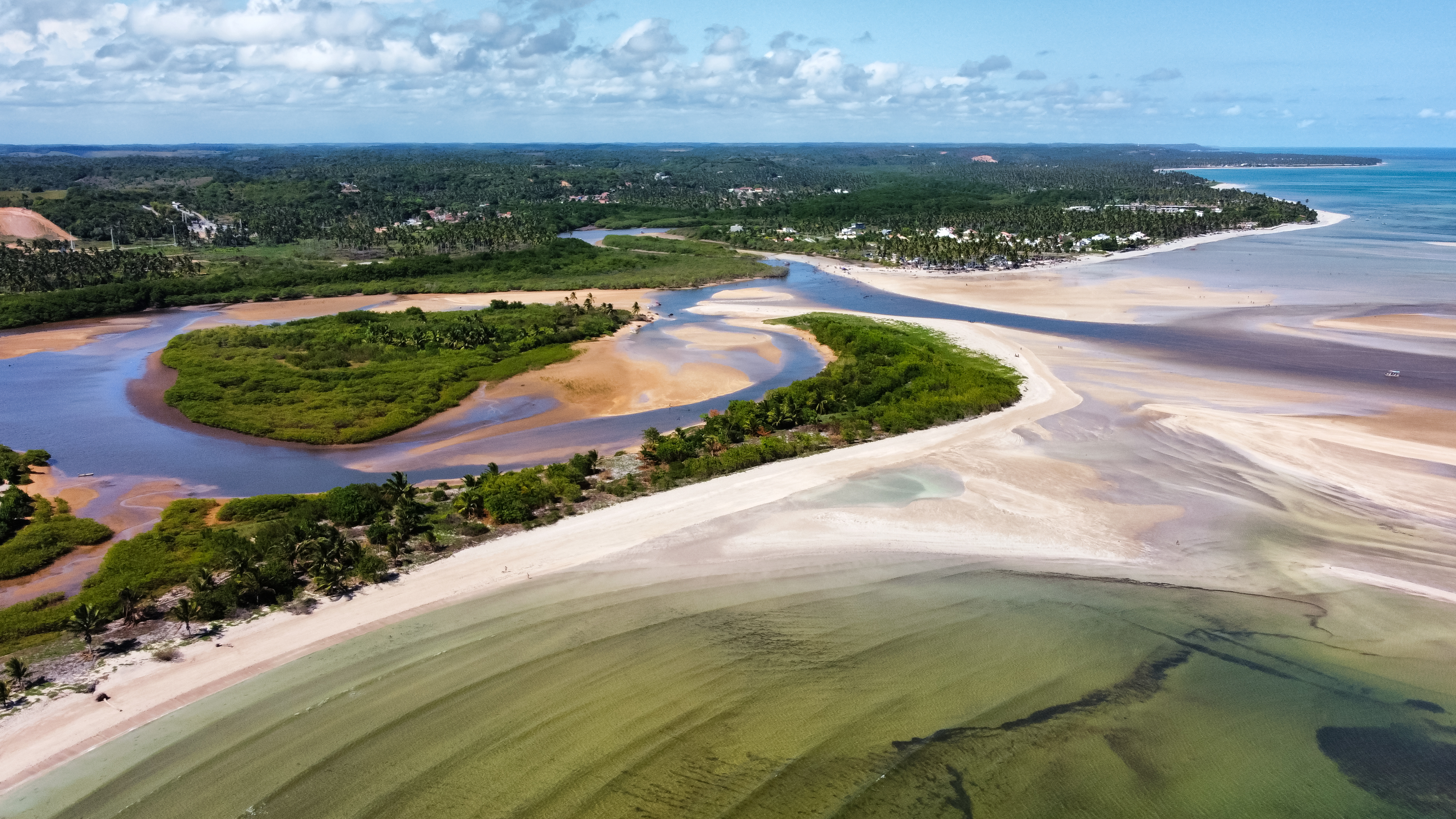
Mouth of the Tabatinga Stream

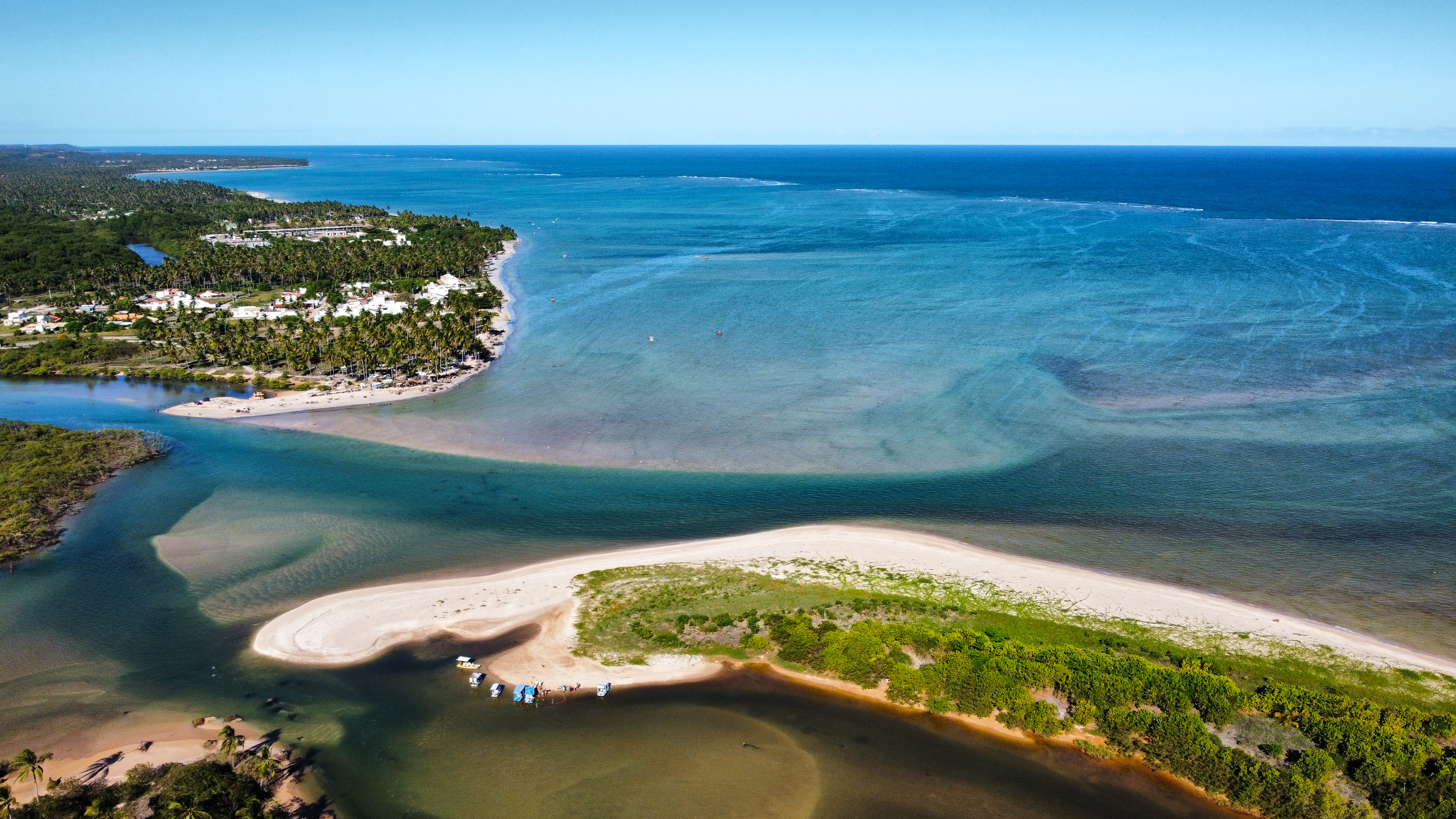
Mouth of the Tabatinga Stream

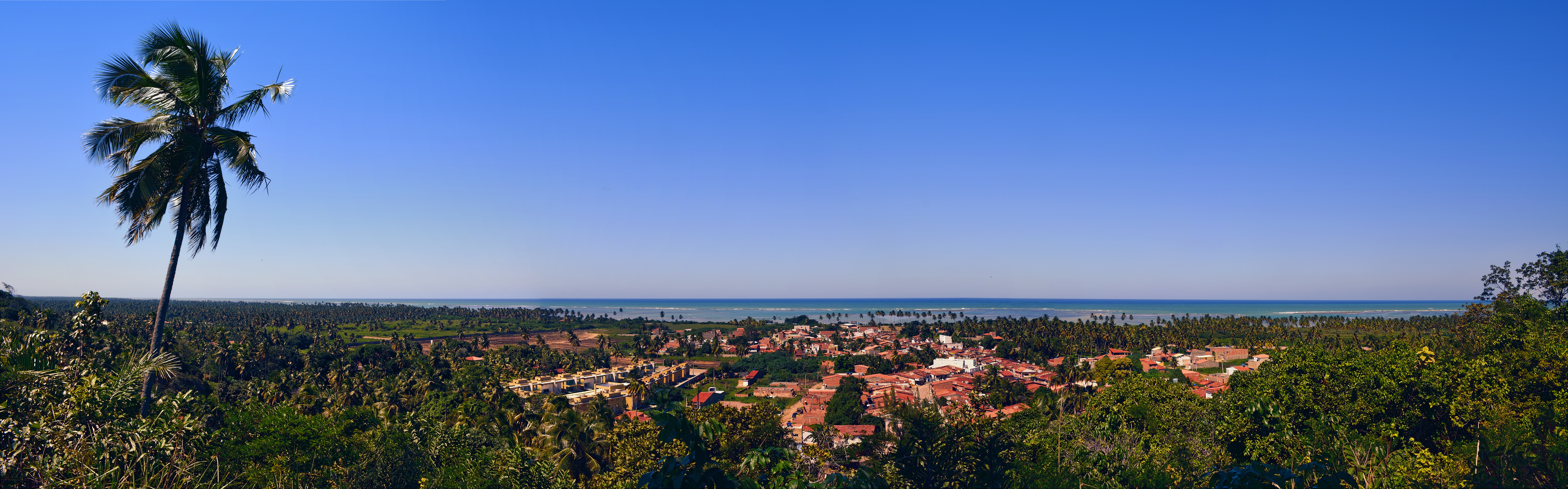
Aerial view of São Miguel dos Milagres from the Alto do Cruzeiro Scenic Lookout

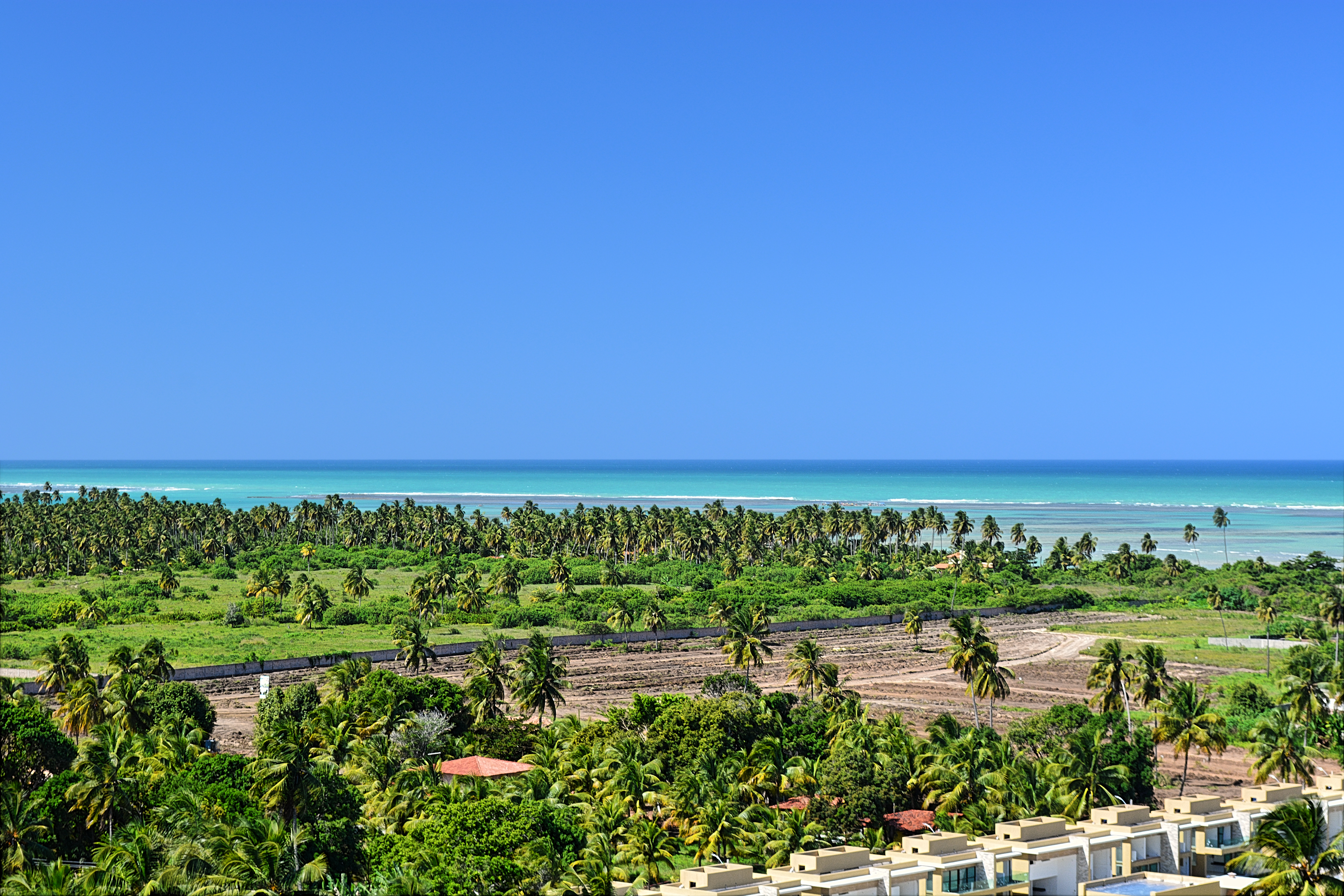
Aerial view of São Miguel dos Milagres from the Alto do Cruzeiro Scenic Lookout

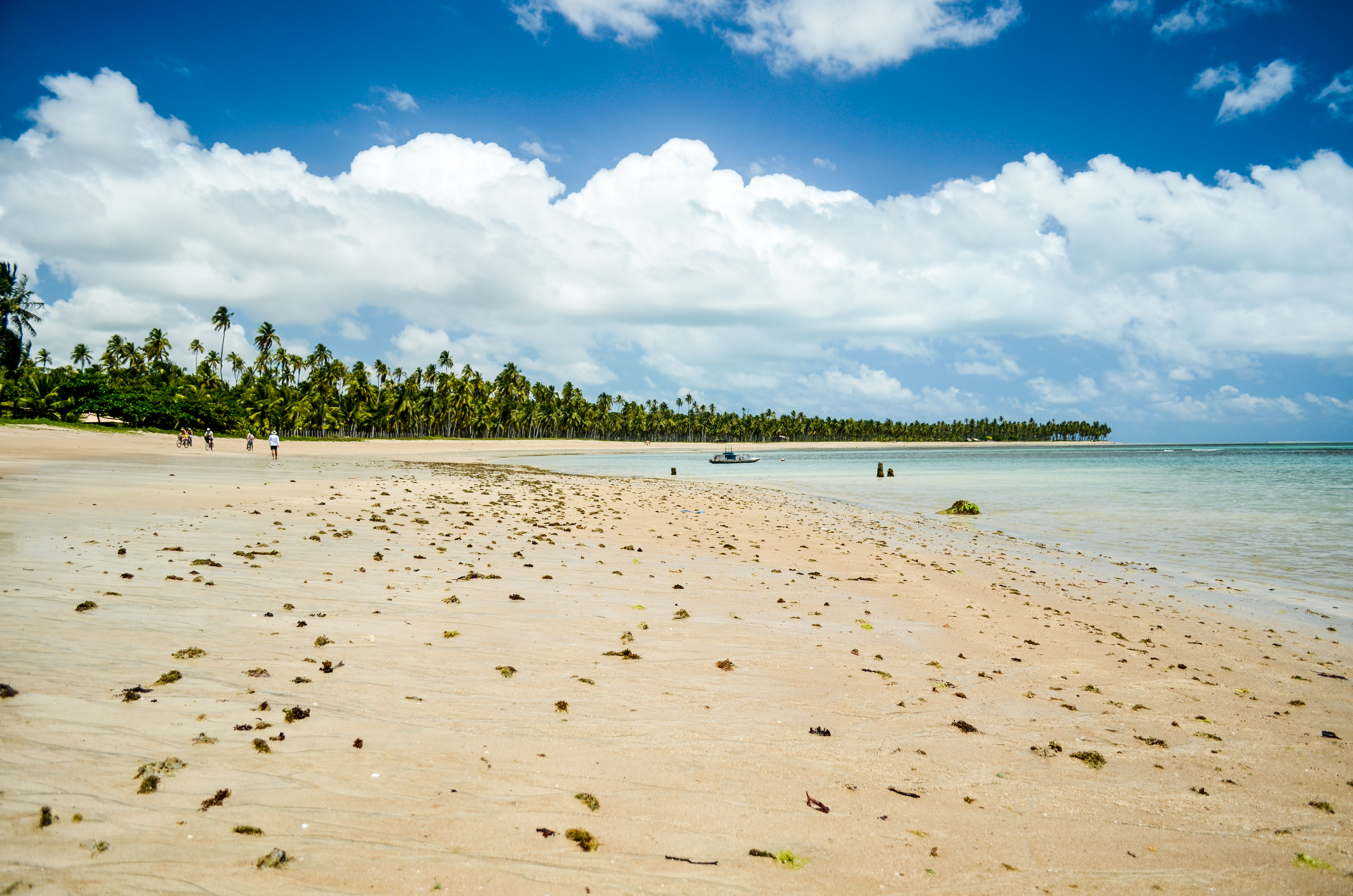
Beach in São Miguel dos Milagres

== See also ==
- List of municipalities in Alagoas
