= Franco Cuter =

Italian-born Brazilian Roman Catholic bishop (1940–2019)

Franco Cuter O.F.M.Cap.
- Bishop of Grajaú
- Church: Catholic Church
- Diocese: Diocese of Grajaú
- In office: 21 January 1998 – 7 December 2016
- Predecessor: Serafino Faustino Spreafico
- Successor: Rubival Cabral Britto

Orders
- Ordination: 26 March 1966 by Luigi Oldani
- Consecration: 19 March 1998 by Paulo Eduardo Andrade Ponte

Personal details
- Born: 28 July 1940 Gazzaniga, Province of Bergamo, Kingdom of Italy
- Died: 28 September 2019 (aged 79) Varese, Lombardy, Italy
- Motto: Ipse Est Pax Nostra

Franco Cuter (28 July 1940 – 28 September 2019) was a Brazilian Roman Catholic bishop.

Cuter was born in Italy and was ordained to the priesthood in 1966. He served as bishop of the Roman Catholic Diocese of Grajaú, Brazil.
