= Zé do Carmo (ceramist) =

Brazilian ceramist (1933–2019)

- Born: José do Carmo Souza; 19 November 1933; Goiana, Brazil
- Died: 26 April 2019 (aged 85); Goiana, Brazil
- Occupation: Ceramist

José do Carmo Souza, also known as Zé do Carmo (Goiana, 19 November 1933 – Goiana, 26 April 2019) was a Brazilian ceramist. He began to work with clay in 1941, when he was 7 years old, and was considered from 2002 until his death in 2019 a Living Heritage of Pernambuco.

== Biography ==
In the year 1980, he, at the request of Dom Hélder Câmara, created a sculpture to be handed over to Pope John Paul II. But Câmara did not approve the sculpture, of an angel with cangaceiro face, saying that that image was profane. The piece was then vetoed and never reached the hands of the Pope, and today, in memoriam, it is in the city of Goiana, in Zé do Carmo's studio.

Zé do Carmo died on April 26, 2019, during hospitalization at the Belarmino Correia hospital, due to a cardiac arrest resulting from lung problems that he had been fighting for 10 years.

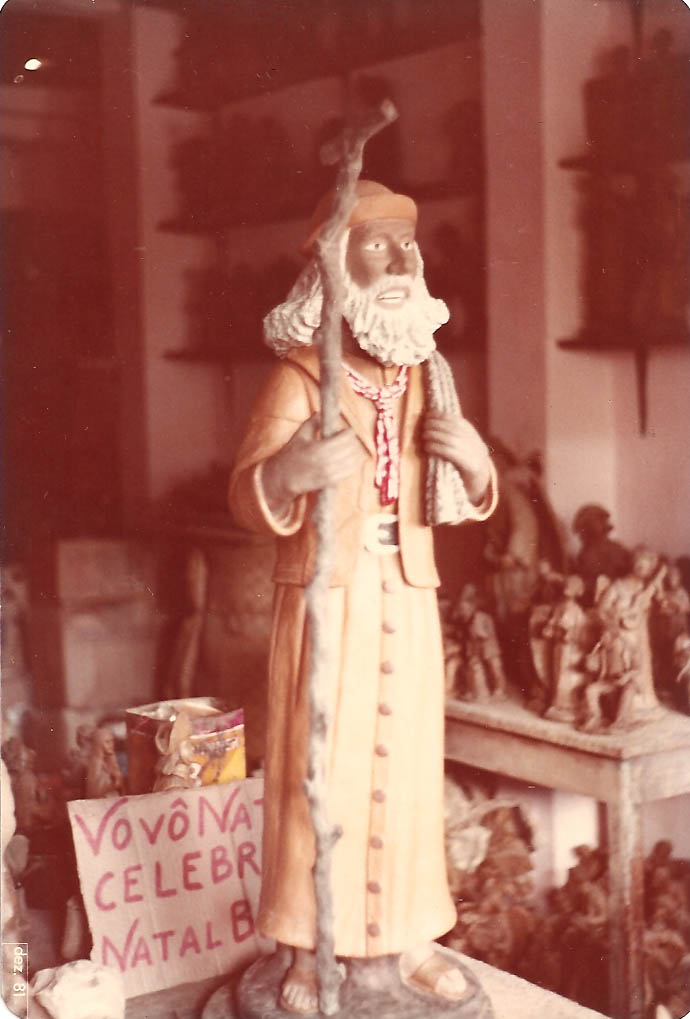
Vovô Natalino, sculpture of Zé do Carmo to oppose Santa Claus
