= Nelson Zeglio =

Brazilian footballer (1926–2019)

Personal information
- Date of birth: 21 November 1926
- Place of birth: São Paulo, Brazil
- Date of death: 25 February 2019 (aged 92)
- Height: 1.75 m (5 ft 9 in)
- Position: Forward

Senior career*
| Years | Team | Apps | (Gls) |
| 1949 | São Paulo | 5 | (3) |
| 1951–1952 | Sochaux | 7 | (1) |
| 1952 | → Montpellier (loan) | 2 | (0) |
| 1952–1954 | CA Paris | 30 | (7) |
| 1954–1955 | Roubaix-Tourcoing | 3 | (1) |
| Total | | 42 | (9) |
- * Club domestic league appearances and goals

Nelson Zeglio (21 November 1926 – 25 February 2019) was a Brazilian professional footballer who played as a forward.

== Career ==
Born in São Paulo, Zeglio moved from São Paulo to French club Sochaux in 1951. He was one of three South Americans to sign for the club at that time (the others being José Montagnoli and Alberto Muro, who were both Argentine). He was the first Brazilian to play for Sochaux, and the only one until Francileudo Santos and Alexandre Finazzi signed in 2000. He made his Sochaux debut on 9 September 1951, scoring his club's only goal in a 3–1 defeat against Lens. He moved on loan to Montpellier in January 1952, and later played for CA Paris and Roubaix-Tourcoing. He finished his career playing back in Brazil.

== Later life and death ==
After retirement, Zeglio worked for Air France for 20 years. In November 2016, on his 90th birthday, Zeglio was Sochaux's eldest living former player.

He died on 25 February 2019, aged 92.
