= Deaths in January 2019 =

The following is a list of notable deaths in January 2019.

Entries for each day are listed alphabetically by surname. A typical entry lists information in the following sequence:

- Name, age, country of citizenship at birth, subsequent country of citizenship (if applicable), reason for notability, cause of death (if known), and reference.

== January 2019 ==
=== 1 ===
- Ludwig W. Adamec, 94, Austrian-born American historian.
- Ross Allen, 90, New Zealand local politician, chair of Taranaki Regional Council (1989–2001), and cricket umpire.
- Yuri Artsutanov, 89, Russian engineer.
- Jamal Ahmad Mohammad Al Badawi, 58, Yemeni militant (Islamic Jihad of Yemen), airstrike.
- Dagfinn Bakke, 85, Norwegian artist.
- Ed Corney, 85, American bodybuilder.
- Ivan Dimitrov, 83, Bulgarian Olympic footballer (Lokomotiv Sofia, Spartak Sofia, national team).
- Feis Ecktuh, 32, Dutch rapper, shot.
- Elizabeth Edgar, 89, New Zealand botanist.
- Katie Flynn, 82, British author.
- Freddie Glidden, 91, Scottish footballer (Hearts, Dumbarton).
- Ivo Gregurević, 66, Croatian actor (Madonna, Fine Dead Girls, What Iva Recorded).
- Joan Guinjoan, 87, Spanish composer and pianist.
- Nicholas Horsfall, 72, British scholar.
- Ke Hua, 103, Chinese diplomat, ambassador to Guinea, Ghana, the Philippines and the United Kingdom.
- Kris Kelmi, 63, Russian singer-songwriter (Autograph), heart attack.
- Bernd Kröplin, 74, German engineer and academic.
- Walt McKeel, 46, American baseball player (Boston Red Sox, Colorado Rockies).
- Paul Neville, 78, Australian politician, MP (1993–2013).
- José Antonio Pujante, 54, Spanish politician, member of the Assembly of Murcia (since 2007), heart attack.
- Raymond Ramazani Baya, 75, Congolese politician, Foreign Minister (2004–2007) and Ambassador to France (1990–1996).
- Richard Rifkind, 88, American cancer researcher.
- Steven P. Schinke, 73, American social work scholar, pulmonary fibrosis.
- Tu Mingjing, 90, Chinese materials scientist, member of the Chinese Academy of Engineering.
- Stephen Twinoburyo, 49, Ugandan mathematician, heart attack.
- María Teresa Uribe, 78, Colombian sociologist and academic (University of Antioquia).
- Nils Utsi, 75, Norwegian Sámi actor (Pathfinder).
- Larry Weinberg, 92, American real estate developer and sports team owner (Portland Trail Blazers).
- Gilbert Winham, 80, American political scientist.
- Pegi Young, 66, American educator, philanthropist, and singer-songwriter, cancer.
- Perry Deane Young, 77, American journalist and playwright, cancer.

=== 2 ===
- Ramakant Achrekar, 87, Indian cricket coach.
- Kalipada Bauri, Indian politician, MLA (1971–1972).
- Malcolm Beard, 99, American politician, member of the Florida Senate (1980–1996) and House of Representatives (1978–1980).
- Darwin Bromley, 68, American game designer, founder of Mayfair Games.
- Jerry Buchek, 76, American baseball player (St. Louis Cardinals, New York Mets).
- Michele Caccavale, 71, Italian politician, Deputy (1994–1996).
- Paulien van Deutekom, 37, Dutch Olympic speed skater (2006), world champion (2008), lung cancer.
- Daryl Dragon, 76, American musician and songwriter (Captain & Tennille, The Beach Boys), renal failure.
- Bob Einstein, 76, American actor (Curb Your Enthusiasm, Ocean's Thirteen) and performer (Super Dave Osborne), leukemia.
- Bill Elsey, 97, British racehorse trainer (Epsom Oaks, St Leger Stakes).
- Dominic Filiou, 41, Canadian strongman, heart attack.
- Julia Grant, 64, British trans woman pioneer (A Change of Sex).
- Gu Fangzhou, 92, Chinese virologist credited with eradicating polio in China, President of Peking Union Medical College.
- Bob Hanner, 73, American politician, member of the Georgia House of Representatives (1974–2013).
- Waun Ki Hong, 76, American oncologist.
- Peter Kelly, 74, Irish politician, TD (2002–2011), cancer.
- Geoffrey Langlands, 101, British army officer and educator.
- Ron Magden, 92, American historian.
- Jerry Magee, 90, American sportswriter (The San Diego Union-Tribune, Pro Football Weekly).
- Jim Margraff, 58, American football coach (Johns Hopkins Blue Jays), heart attack.
- Salvador Martínez Pérez, 85, Mexican Roman Catholic prelate, Bishop of Huejutla (1994–2009).
- Joe McCabe, 99, Irish hurler (Clonad, Laois).
- Kevin J. McIntyre, 57, American government official, Chairman of the FERC (2017–2018), brain cancer.
- Marko Nikolić, 72, Serbian actor (Bolji život).
- Blake Nordstrom, 58, American businessman, co-president of Nordstrom, lymphoma.
- Gene Okerlund, 76, American Hall of Fame professional wrestling interviewer (AWA, WWF, WCW), complications from a fall.
- Darius Perkins, 54, Australian actor (Neighbours, Home and Away, Prisoner), cancer.
- Suzy Post, 85, American civil rights activist.
- Samuel Rayan, 98, Indian theologian.
- Marie Michele Rey, 80, Haitian politician.
- Otto Schnepp, 93, Austrian-born American scientist.
- Marcellin Theeuwes, 82, Dutch Carthusian monk.
- Jerzy Turonek, 89, Polish-Belarusian historian.
- Tommy Watz, 60, Norwegian translator.
- George Welsh, 85, American football coach (Navy Midshipmen, Virginia Cavaliers).

=== 3 ===
- Hamza Abdullahi, 73, Nigerian politician, Military Governor of Kano State (1984–1985) and Minister of Federal Capital Territory (1986–1989).
- Roger Bastié, 86, French rugby union player and coach (CA Brive).
- Richard C. Bradt, 80, American materials engineer.
- Bob Burrow, 84, American basketball player (Kentucky Wildcats, Minneapolis Lakers, Rochester Royals).
- Joe Casely-Hayford, 62, British fashion designer, cancer.
- Ernesto del Castillo, 89, Mexican Olympic equestrian (1968).
- William Cochran, 84, American politician, member of the Indiana House of Representatives (1974–1982).
- Sylvia Chase, 80, American news anchor (KRON, ABC World News Tonight) and journalist (20/20).
- Marcelle Corneille, 95, Canadian music educator.
- Gordon Crosby, 91, Canadian Olympic sprinter.
- Chandrashekhar Shankar Dharmadhikari, 91, Indian judge and independence activist.
- John Falsey, 67, American television writer and producer (St. Elsewhere, I'll Fly Away, Northern Exposure), fall.
- Jack Fennell, 85, English rugby league footballer (Featherstone Rovers).
- Gao Chengyong, 54, Chinese serial killer and rapist, executed.
- Radamel García, 61, Colombian Olympic footballer (1980), heart attack.
- Theodore E. Gildred, 83, American diplomat, Ambassador to Argentina (1986–1989).
- Roy Givens, 89, American politician, member of the West Virginia House of Delegates (1978–2012)
- Reg Holland, 78, English footballer (Wrexham, Chester City, Altrincham).
- Harold A. Hopkins Jr., 88, American Episcopal prelate, bishop of North Dakota (1980–1988).
- Sayed Ashraful Islam, 67, Bangladeshi politician, MP (since 2008) and Minister of Public Administration (since 2009), lung cancer.
- Kenneth Kauth, 94, American politician, member of the South Dakota House of Representatives (1969–1978).
- Herb Kelleher, 87, American businessman, co-founder of Southwest Airlines.
- William Miller, 62, American football player (Winnipeg Blue Bombers, Pittsburgh Maulers, Orlando Renegades), cancer.
- Anne-Marie Minvielle, 75, French journalist.
- Dibyendu Palit, 79, Indian writer.
- Steve Ripley, 69, American musician (The Tractors), cancer.
- Christine de Rivoyre, 97, French journalist (Le Monde), writer, and literary editor (Marie Claire).
- John Shaw, 70, American-Canadian painter.
- José Vida Soria, 81, Spanish jurist, writer and politician, Deputy (1977–1981) and rector of University of Granada (1984–1989), cancer.
- Thais St. Julien, 73, American opera singer, Alzheimer's disease.
- Wulf Steinmann, 88, German physicist.
- William H. Stetson, American Roman Catholic priest.
- Pinaki Thakur, 59, Indian poet, malaria.
- Michael Yeung, 73, Chinese Roman Catholic prelate, Bishop of Hong Kong (since 2017), liver failure.

=== 4 ===
- Milan Balabán, 89, Czech theologian, Evangelical Church of Czech Brethren pastor and anti-communist dissident (Charter 77).
- Norman Birnbaum, 92, American sociologist, heart disease and sepsis.
- Syed Zulfiqar Bokhari, Pakistani diplomat.
- Ivan Bortnik, 79, Russian actor (Family Relations, Mirror for a Hero, Lost in Siberia).
- Harold Brown, 91, American government official and nuclear physicist, Secretary of Defense (1977–1981), pancreatic cancer.
- John Burningham, 82, English author and illustrator, pneumonia.
- Moffatt Burriss, 99, American politician, member of the South Carolina House of Representatives (1977–1992).
- Gordon Cologne, 94, American politician.
- Charles Currie, 88, American Jesuit academic administrator, President of the AJCU (1997–2011), Xavier University (1982–1985), and Wheeling Jesuit University (1972–1982).
- Diana Decker, 93, American-born British actress (When You Come Home, The Barefoot Contessa) and singer ("Poppa Piccolino").
- Harold Demsetz, 88, American economist.
- Peter Doucette, 64, Canadian politician, MLA (1989–1996).
- Leo J. Dulacki, 100, American general.
- Turhan Erdoğan, 81, Turkish civil engineer.
- Miguel Gallastegui, 100, Spanish pelotari.
- David Garman, 96, British inventor and businessman.
- Hakmeen Khan, Pakistani politician, founder of Pakistan Peoples Party.
- Louisa Moritz, 82, Cuban-born American actress (Love, American Style, One Flew Over the Cuckoo's Nest, Loose Shoes), heart failure.
- Frank Mugglestone, 94, English rugby league footballer (Bradford Northern, Castleford).
- John Nallen, 86, Irish Gaelic footballer (Crossmolina, Tuam Stars, Trim).
- Oldenburg Baby, 21, German abortion survivor, lung infection.
- Francisco Olivencia, 84, Spanish lawyer and politician, Deputy (1979–1982) and Senator (1993–2000).
- Bob Price, 82, American politician.
- Jean Revillard, 51, Swiss photojournalist, heart attack.
- Norman Snider, 74, Canadian screenwriter (Dead Ringers, Body Parts, Casino Jack).
- John Thornett, 83, Australian rugby union player (New South Wales, national team).
- Wiet Van Broeckhoven, 69, Belgian radio presenter and writer.
- Doris Veillette, 83, Canadian journalist.
- Roy Walsh, 82, British Olympic diver.
- Jun'ya Yokota, 73, Japanese author, heart failure.
- Zhang Lianwen, 73, Chinese actor.

=== 5 ===
- Emil Brumaru, 80, Romanian writer and poet.
- Sergio Otoniel Contreras Navia, 92, Chilean Roman Catholic prelate, Bishop of San Carlos de Ancud (1966–1974) and Temuco (1977–2001).
- Mungau Dain, 24, Ni-Vanuatu film actor (Tanna), sepsis.
- Silvano Davo, 73, Italian racing cyclist.
- Rick Down, 68, American baseball hitting coach (New York Yankees, Boston Red Sox, New York Mets).
- Scott Dozier, 48, American convicted murderer, suicide by hanging.
- Jean-Eudes Dubé, 92, Canadian politician.
- Alvin Fielder, 83, American jazz drummer, complications from heart failure and pneumonia.
- Derek Foster, Baron Foster of Bishop Auckland, 81, British politician, MP for Bishop Auckland (1979–2005) and member of the House of Lords (since 2005), cancer.
- Don Grierson, 77, British music industry executive.
- Eric Haydock, 75, British Hall of Fame bassist (The Hollies).
- Kenneth Hedberg, 98, American chemist.
- Stanley Insler, 81, American philologist.
- Odeen Ishmael, 70, Guyanese diplomat.
- Abe Kakepetum, 74, Canadian Anishinaabe painter.
- Iftekharul Alam Kislu, 92, Bangladeshi film producer (Sangam, Ora Egaro Jon, Dui Poisar Alta) and businessperson.
- John Kouns, 89, American photographer and civil rights activist.
- Aisha Lemu, 79, British-born Nigerian Islamic scholar.
- Alan W. Lukens, 94, American diplomat.
- John Lyle, 98, American pilot (Tuskegee Airmen).
- Maria Dolores Malumbres, 87, Spanish pianist and composer.
- Pete Manning, 81, American football player (Chicago Bears, Calgary Stampedes, Toronto Argonauts).
- Robert Morey, 72, American Baptist minister.
- Alan R. Pearlman, 93, American sound engineer, founder of ARP Instruments.
- Rudolf Raff, 77, American biologist.
- John L. Said, 86, American Episcopal bishop (Southeast Florida, Central Florida).
- Bernice Sandler, 90, American women's rights activist, cancer.
- Dragoslav Šekularac, 81, Serbian football player (Red Star Belgrade, Yugoslavia national team) and manager (Marbella).
- Alexis Smirnoff, 71, Canadian professional wrestler (NWA, AWA, WWF), kidney failure.
- James H. Smylie, 93, American church historian.
- Sun Ganqing, 99, Chinese major general, Chief of Staff of the Guangzhou Military Region (1969–1977) and the Kunming Military Region (1977–1980).
- Myron Thompson, 82, American-born Canadian politician, MP (1993–2008), cancer.
- Antonio Torres Millera, 54, Spanish politician, member of the Aragonese Corts (since 2003), heart attack.

=== 6 ===
- Jo Andres, 64, American filmmaker, choreographer and artist, peritoneal sclerosis.
- Alfredo Arpaia, 88, Italian politician, Deputy (1982–1983).
- Joe Belmont, 84, American basketball player and coach.
- Annalise Braakensiek, 46, Australian model and actress (Pizza).
- Johan Claassen, 89, South African rugby union player and coach (national team).
- Ben Coleman, 57, American basketball player (New Jersey Nets, Philadelphia 76ers, Milwaukee Bucks).
- George Crowe, 82, Canadian ice hockey coach (Dartmouth College).
- Francisco Dela Cruz, 56, Northern Mariana Islands politician, member of the House of Representatives (2006–2014), heart attack.
- Robert J. Doherty, 94, American photographer and graphic designer.
- Odette Drand, 91, French Olympic fencer (1952).
- José Ramón Fernández, 95, Cuban militant, Vice-President of the Council of Ministers (1978–2012).
- Jack Garrick, 92, Australian VFL footballer (South Melbourne).
- Lenny Green, 86, American baseball player (Detroit Tigers, Baltimore Orioles, Boston Red Sox).
- Roy Hilton, 75, American football player (Baltimore Colts), Alzheimer's disease.
- Ron Hines, 95, Australian VFL footballer (Carlton).
- Robert L. Kahn, 100, American social psychologist.
- Kwamie Lassiter, 49, American football player (Arizona Cardinals, San Diego Chargers, St. Louis Rams), heart attack.
- Gebhardt von Moltke, 80, German diplomat, Ambassador to the UK (1997–1999).
- Derek Piggott, 96, British glider pilot and flight instructor, stroke.
- Ken Preston, 93, English cricketer (Essex).
- Gregg Rudloff, 63, American sound mixer (The Matrix, Mad Max: Fury Road, Glory), Oscar winner (1990, 2000, 2016), suicide.
- Lamin Sanneh, 76, Gambian-born American professor (Yale University, Yale Divinity School), stroke.
- W. Morgan Sheppard, 86, British actor (Transformers, Max Headroom, Gettysburg).
- Paul Streeten, 101, Austrian-born British economist.
- René Steurbaut, 90, Belgian Olympic basketball player (1948).
- Gustav Andreas Tammann, 86, German astronomer.
- Roy Tutty, 88, Australian Olympic speed skater (1960).
- Bea Vianen, 83, Surinamese writer.
- Angelo Ziccardi, 90, Italian politician, Senator (1972–1983).
- Gene Zwozdesky, 70, Canadian politician, Speaker of the Legislative Assembly of Alberta (2012–2015), cancer.

=== 7 ===
- Moshe Arens, 93, Lithuanian-born Israeli aeronautical engineer and politician, Minister of Defense (1983–1984, 1990–1992, 1999) and Foreign Affairs (1988–1990).
- Aristeo Benavídez, 91, Argentine alpine skier.
- Helmut Berding, 88, German historian.
- Seymour Boyers, 92, American politician.
- Barbara Elaine Russell Brown, 89, American biologist and philanthropist.
- Guy Charmot, 104, French resistance fighter.
- Vytautas Einoris, 88, Lithuanian agronomist and politician.
- Laurie Gilfedder, 83, English rugby league footballer (national team, Warrington, Wigan).
- Jimmy Hannan, 84, Australian singer and game show host (Saturday Date), Gold Logie winner (1965), cancer.
- Francisco Hernández, 69, Costa Rican football player (Saprissa, national team).
- John Joubert, 91, South African-born British composer.
- Aline Kiner, 59, French journalist and writer.
- Clydie King, 75, American singer, complications from a blood infection.
- Dave Laing, 71, English writer, editor and broadcaster, cancer.
- Alanna Lockward, 57, Dominican curator, writer and filmmaker.
- Houari Manar, 38, Algerian raï singer, heart attack.
- Ivan Mašek, 70, Czech dissident, economist and politician, Deputy (1993–1998).
- John Mendelsohn, 82, American pharmacologist, President of the University of Texas MD Anderson Cancer Center (1996–2011), glioblastoma.
- Harold J. Noah, 93, British-born American educational theorist.
- Theodore K. Rabb, 81, American historian.
- Ronald C. Read, 94, British-born Canadian mathematician.
- Carmencita Reyes, 87, Filipino politician, member of the House of Representatives (2007–2010), Governor of Marinduque (1998–2007; since 2010).
- A. G. Rigg, 81, British medievalist.
- Tom Rukavina, 68, American politician, member of the Minnesota House of Representatives (1987–2013), leukemia.
- Jocelyne Saab, 70, Lebanese journalist and film director, cancer.
- Babs Simpson, 105, American magazine editor (Vogue).
- Robert P. Smith, 78, American economist.
- Bernard Tchoullouyan, 65, French judoka, Olympic bronze medalist (1980), heart attack.

=== 8 ===
- Jimmy Allen, 91, American pastor.
- Wendy Ashmore, 70, American archaeologist and anthropologist.
- Pierre Barillet, 95, French actor and playwright.
- José Belvino do Nascimento, 86, Brazilian Roman Catholic prelate, Bishop of Itumbiara (1981–1987) and Divinópolis (1989–2009).
- Jayantilal Bhanusali, 54, Indian politician, MLA (2007–2012), shot.
- Antal Bolvári, 86, Hungarian water polo player, Olympic champion (1952, 1956).
- Armando Bortolaso, 92, Italian-born Syrian Roman Catholic prelate, Vicar Apostolic of Aleppo (1992–2002).
- Greg Cleveland, 55, American football player (Miami Dolphins), heart attack.
- Sir William Cole, 92, Australian public servant, Secretary of the Department of Defence (1984–1986).
- Georges Dimou, 87, Greek singer.
- Edwin Erickson, 80, American politician, member of the Pennsylvania Senate (2001–2015).
- Gao Changqing, 59, Chinese surgeon, member of the Academy of Engineering.
- Derek Grace, 74, English footballer (Margate, Exeter City, Dartford).
- Khosro Harandi, 68, Iranian chess master.
- Huang Chin-tao, 93, Taiwanese World War II veteran (Imperial Japanese Navy) and resistance fighter (27 Brigade).
- Susanne Humphrey, 74, American medical librarian (National Library of Medicine).
- Karsten Jakobsen, 90, Norwegian engineer, rector of the Norwegian Institute of Technology (1990–1993).
- Sergei Khodakov, 52, Russian paralympic athlete (1992, 1996).
- Guje Lagerwall, 100, Swedish actress.
- Larry Langford, 72, American politician, Mayor of Birmingham, Alabama (2007–2009).
- Patricia Lousada (89), American ballet dancer and cookbook author, heart attack.
- Alexia Mupende, 34, Kenyan-born Rwandan model, stabbed.
- John Nye, 95, British glaciologist, heart failure.
- Arturo Rojas de la Cámara, 88, Spanish cartoonist.
- Julio Rubiano, 65, Colombian Olympic racing cyclist, heart attack.
- Bijan Samandar, 77, Iranian poet and musician.
- Linda Waterfall, 69, American folk musician, cancer.
- Giorgio Zur, 88, German Roman Catholic prelate, Apostolic Nuncio (1979–2005).

=== 9 ===
- Filipe Abraão, 39, Angolan basketball player (Atlético Sport Aviação, Primeiro de Agosto, Recreativo do Libolo).
- Ian Adamson, 74, Northern Irish politician, Lord Mayor of Belfast (1996–1997), MLA (1998–2003).
- Fernando Aiuti, 83, Italian immunologist and politician, fall.
- Gebran Araiji, 67, Lebanese politician.
- Kjell Bäckman, 84, Swedish speed skater, Olympic bronze medalist (1960).
- Verna Bloom, 80, American actress (Animal House, High Plains Drifter, The Last Temptation of Christ), complications from dementia.
- Pierre de Bané, 80, Palestinian-born Canadian politician, MP (1968–2013).
- Óscar González-Quevedo, 88, Spanish-born Brazilian Jesuit priest and parapsychologist, heart disease.
- Earnest F. Gloyna, 97, American environmental engineer.
- Joseph Lawson Howze, 95, American Roman Catholic prelate, Bishop of Biloxi (1977–2001).
- Joseph Jarman, 81, American jazz musician (Art Ensemble of Chicago) and Shinshu Buddhist priest.
- Conxita Julià, 98, Spanish Catalan poet.
- Rena Karefa-Smart, 97, American religious leader and theologian.
- Paul Koslo, 74, German-Canadian actor (The Omega Man, Vanishing Point, Rooster Cogburn) pancreatic cancer.
- Matthew Locricchio, 71, American cookbook author and actor.
- Anatoly Lukyanov, 88, Russian politician, Chairman of the Supreme Soviet of the Soviet Union (1990–1991).
- Mahendra Mewati, 49, Indian actor, blood clot.
- Melvin L. Moeschberger, 78, American biostatistician.
- Milan Pančevski, 83, Macedonian politician, Chairman of the Presidium of the League of Communists of Yugoslavia (1989–1990).
- Paolo Paoloni, 89, Italian actor (Fantozzi, An Average Little Man, Cannibal Holocaust).
- Don Reynolds, 81, American child actor (Song of Arizona, The Fighting Redhead, Beyond the Purple Hills).
- Thierry Séchan, 69, French novelist.
- James P. Stewart, 94, American military officer.
- Alan Trask, 85, American politician, member of the Florida Senate (1969–1971, 1973–1982).
- Lester Wunderman, 98, American Hall of Fame advertising executive, creator of direct marketing.

=== 10 ===
- Theo Adam, 92, German opera singer.
- José Andreu García, 81, Puerto Rican jurist, Chief Justice of the Supreme Court (1992–2003).
- Erminio Boso, 73, Italian politician, Senator (1992–1996), heart attack.
- Edward F. Burns, 87, American politician, member of the Pennsylvania House of Representatives (1973–1990).
- Lili Cassel-Wronker, 94, German-born American illustrator and calligrapher.
- Andy de Groat, 72, American choreographer.
- Philippe de Lannoy, 96, Belgian noble.
- Alfredo del Mazo González, 75, Mexican politician, Governor of the State of Mexico (1981–1986) and Minister of Energy, Mines and State Industry (1986–1988).
- Deng Tietao, 102, Chinese physician.
- Rick Forzano, 90, American football coach (Detroit Lions).
- Kevin Fret, 25, Puerto Rican musician, shot.
- Martin Gore, 67, British oncologist, complications following yellow fever vaccination.
- Johnny Hetki, 96, American baseball player (Cincinnati Reds, Pittsburgh Pirates).
- Gerd Jaeger, 91, German sculptor and painter.
- Mikel Janku, 77, Albanian footballer (Partizani, national team).
- Barbara Low, 98, British-American biochemist.
- Ross Lowell, 92, American photographer and inventor of gaffer tape.
- Patrick Malrieu, 73, French business executive and Breton activist and historian.
- John Michels, 87, American football player (Tennessee Volunteers) and coach (Minnesota Vikings).
- René Mouille, 94, French aviation engineer.
- Dianne Oxberry, 51, British broadcaster (BBC North West Tonight), cancer.
- Lionel Price, 91, British Olympic basketball player (1948).
- Juan Francisco Reyes, 80, Guatemalan politician, Vice President (2000–2004).
- Sandy Shellworth, 74, American Olympic alpine ski racer.
- Clary Hood Smith, 90, American politician.
- Ron Smith, 94, British comic artist (Judge Dredd).
- Viktoria Suchantseva, 69, Ukrainian philosopher.
- Sir Conrad Swan, 94, Canadian-born British officer of arms.
- Arnold Tucker, 95, American military officer and football player.
- Michel Vandamme, 88, French Olympic swimmer.

=== 11 ===
- Béatrice Ahyi Aguessy, Beninese gynaecologist and academic.
- Hugo Alarcón, 26, Chilean footballer (Deportes La Pintana, Deportes Linares, Deportes Melipilla).
- Sir Michael Atiyah, 89, British mathematician, President of the Royal Society (1990–1995).
- Rafael Arcadio Bernal Supelano, 84, Colombian Roman Catholic prelate, Bishop of Arauca (1990–2003) and Líbano-Honda (2003–2004).
- Wayne Blair, 70, New Zealand cricketer (Otago).
- George Brady, 90, Czech-Canadian Holocaust survivor and businessman.
- Tom Brosius, 69, American track and field athlete, pancreatic cancer.
- Marge Callaghan, 97, Canadian baseball player (All-American Girls Professional Baseball League).
- Walter Chandoha, 98, American photographer.
- Angelo Constantino, 48, Filipino bowler, shot.
- Michel Dejouhannet, 83, French racing cyclist.
- Mark Elliot, 65, Canadian radio host (CFRA), pneumonia.
- Gus Ganakas, 92, American college basketball coach (Michigan State).
- J. D. Gibbs, 49, American race car driver, co-owner of Joe Gibbs Racing, degenerative neurological disease.
- John G. Gunderson, 76, American psychiatrist, prostate cancer.
- David Hinkley, 74, British-born American statistician.
- Khalida Hussain, 82, Pakistani fiction writer.
- Robert Horn, 87, American Olympic water polo player.
- Elaine Koppelman, 81, American mathematician.
- Steffan Lewis, 34, Welsh politician, AM (since 2016), bowel cancer.
- Fernando Luján, 79, Mexican actor (Overboard, Día de muertos, Dangers of Youth), respiratory failure.
- Andrew MacLachlan, 77, British actor (Monty Python's Life of Brian, A Fish Called Wanda, By the Sword Divided).
- Sue Povey, 76, British geneticist.
- Kishore Pradhan, 82, Indian actor.
- Dinanath Pandey, 85, Indian politician, MLA (1977–1985) and (1990–1995).
- Mary Randlett, 94, American photographer.
- Annie Roycroft, 92, Irish newspaper editor.
- Meera Sanyal, 57, Indian banker, cancer.
- Walter V. Shipley, 83, American businessman, CEO of Chase Manhattan Bank (1996–1999).
- Dimitris Sioufas, 75, Greek politician, Speaker of the Parliament (2007–2009).
- Bjørg Skjælaaen, 85, Norwegian Olympic figure skater.
- Charles Soreng, 84, Indian Roman Catholic prelate, Bishop of Daltonganj (1989–1995) and Hazaribag (1995–2012).
- Mark Suggitt, 62, British museum curator.
- Tom Warner, 70, American politician, member of the Florida House of Representatives (1992–1999), cancer.
- Jumping Johnny Wilson, 91, American basketball player (Harlem Globetrotters).

=== 12 ===
- George Ball, 92, American entomologist.
- Christian Conrad Blouin, 77, Canadian-born Papua New Guinean Roman Catholic prelate, Bishop of Lae (2007–2018).
- Bo Hi Pak, 88, South Korean cleric, leader of the Unification Church.
- Anthony Colaizzo, 88, American politician, member of the Pennsylvania House of Representatives (1989–1998).
- A. Brian Deer, 74, Canadian librarian, developer of the Brian Deer Classification System.
- Mardi Dungey, 52, Australian macroeconomist.
- Paul Englund, 80, American biochemist, Parkinson's disease.
- Bonnie Guitar, 95, American country musician ("Dark Moon").
- Dennis Marvin Ham, 78, Canadian businessman and politician.
- Javier de Hoz, 78, Spanish philologist and academic.
- Etsuko Ichihara, 82, Japanese actress (Your Name, Hideyoshi, The Great Adventure of Horus, Prince of the Sun), heart failure.
- Joe M. Jackson, 95, American Air Force officer, Medal of Honor recipient.
- Linda Kelly, 82, English historian.
- Larry Koentopp, 82, American minor-league baseball executive (Las Vegas Stars) and athletic director (Gonzaga University).
- Bob Kuechenberg, 71, American football player (Miami Dolphins).
- Max Deen Larsen, 75, American musicologist.
- Batton Lash, 65, American comic book writer and artist (Supernatural Law, Archie Meets the Punisher), brain cancer.
- Edward J. Megarr, 91, American major general.
- Bob Melby, 90, American politician.
- Taw Phaya, 94, Burmese prince, Head of the Royal House of Konbaung (since 1956).
- Leonard M. Pike, 78, American agricultural scientist, developed the 1015 supersweet onion.
- Jaime Rosenthal, 82, Honduran politician, Third Vice President (1986–1989) and MP (2002–2006), heart attack.
- Sanger D. Shafer, 84, American country songwriter ("All My Ex's Live in Texas", "Does Fort Worth Ever Cross Your Mind").
- John Slim, 2nd Viscount Slim, 91, British peer, member of the House of Lords (since 1971).
- Rebecca Walker Steele, 93, American musician and educator.
- Takeshi Umehara, 93, Japanese philosopher, pneumonia.
- Mark Urman, 66, American film producer (ThinkFilm) and distributor, respiratory failure.
- Bruno Vanryb, 61, French sound engineer and businessman, traffic collision.
- Patricia Wald, 90, American judge, Chief Judge of the United States Court of Appeals for the District of Columbia Circuit (1986–1991), pancreatic cancer.
- Patrick Yu, 96, Hong Kong barrister, city's first Chinese prosecutor.
- Béla Zsitnik, 94, Hungarian rower, Olympic bronze medalist (1948).

=== 13 ===
- Pierre Alard, 81, French Olympic discus thrower (1956, 1960).
- Kimiko O. Bowman, 91, Japanese-born American statistician.
- Bettina F. Bradbury, 64, American television writer (All My Children, Santa Barbara, Days of Our Lives).
- Omer Brandt, 92, Canadian ice hockey player (Colorado College Tigers).
- Roberto Reinaldo Cáceres González, 97, Argentinian-born Uruguayan Roman Catholic prelate, Bishop of Melo (1962–1996).
- Miguel Civil, 92, Spanish sumerologist.
- Douglas M. Costle, 79, American environmentalist, Administrator of the Environmental Protection Agency (1977–1981), complications from a stroke.
- Barry Curtis, 75, American actor (The Adventures of Champion).
- Sally Fraser, 86, American actress (War of the Colossal Beast, It Conquered the World, Earth vs. the Spider).
- Rajesh Ghodge, 43, Indian cricketer (Goa cricket team).
- Francine du Plessix Gray, 88, Polish-born American author and critic.
- Erik Hartsuiker, 78, Dutch Olympic rower.
- Robert Heaney, 82, Australian rugby league footballer.
- Luella Klein, 94, American physician.
- Phil Masinga, 49, South African footballer (Leeds United, Bari, national team), cancer.
- Willie Murphy, 75, American blues musician (Running, Jumping, Standing Still), pneumonia.
- Susanne Neumann, 59, German author and trade unionist, cancer.
- Alfred K. Newman, 94, American Navajo code talker.
- Francis W. Nye, 100, American major general in the U.S. Air Force.
- Julen Roselló, 2, Spanish child, fall.
- Serena Rothschild, 83, British racehorse owner.
- Guy Sénac, 86, French footballer.
- Mel Stottlemyre, 77, American baseball player (New York Yankees) and coach (New York Mets, Houston Astros), multiple myeloma.
- Bo Westlake, 91, Canadian Olympic rower.
- Kazimierz Zelek, 81, Polish Olympic cross-country skier.

=== 14 ===
- Ido Abram, 78, Dutch writer and educator.
- Paweł Adamowicz, 53, Polish politician, Mayor of Gdańsk (since 1998), stabbed.
- Bernardo Benes, 84, Cuban banker and community leader.
- Milton Bluehouse Sr., 82, American politician, President of the Navajo Nation (1998–1999).
- Dick Brodowski, 86, American baseball player (Boston Red Sox, Cleveland Indians).
- Gonzalo Ramiro del Castillo Crespo, 82, Bolivian Roman Catholic prelate, Bishop of Military (2000–2012).
- Jim Clark, 71, American baseball player (Cleveland Indians).
- Roger Cuvillier, 96, French engineer and inventor.
- Shivajirao Deshmukh, 84, Indian politician.
- Eli Grba, 84, American baseball player (New York Yankees, Los Angeles Angels), pancreatic cancer.
- Del Henney, 83, English actor (When Eight Bells Toll, Straw Dogs, Brannigan).
- David N. Levinson, 83, American businessman and politician.
- Peter Nambundunga, 71, Namibian military officer.
- James C. Nance, 91, American scientist.
- Francisco de Oliveira Dias, 88, Portuguese politician, Speaker of the Assembly (1981–1982) and Deputy (1976–1983).
- Raymond G. Perelman, 101, American businessman and philanthropist.
- Lenin Rajendran, 67, Indian film director (Venal, Puravrutham, Mazha) and screenwriter, complications from liver transplant.
- Wilf Rosenberg, 84, South African rugby league player (Leeds, Hull, national team), stroke.
- Martha Ross, 79, British actress (EastEnders, Grange Hill) and radio presenter.
- Gavin Smith, 50, Canadian professional poker player.
- Rainer Stadelmann, 85, German Egyptologist.
- Tinca Stegovec, 91, Slovenian artist.
- Devendra Swarup, 93, Indian journalist.
- Julio Vallejo Ruiloba, 73, Spanish psychiatrist.
- Duncan Welbourne, 78, English footballer (Watford).

=== 15 ===
- Bill Anagnos, 60, American stuntman and actor (The Warriors, The Bourne Ultimatum, A Beautiful Mind).
- Bai Hua, 88, Chinese novelist, playwright and poet.
- Avraham Bendori, 90, Israeli football player (Maccabi Tel Aviv, national team) and manager (Hapoel Ramat Gan).
- Bradley Bolke, 93, American voice actor (The New Casper Cartoon Show, Underdog, The Year Without a Santa Claus).
- Jacques Boyon, 84, French politician, Deputy (1986, 1988–1997).
- Carol Channing, 97, American Hall of Fame actress (Hello, Dolly!, Gentlemen Prefer Blondes, Thoroughly Modern Millie), singer and dancer, Tony winner (1964).
- Edyr de Castro, 72, Brazilian actress (Roque Santeiro, Por Amor, Cabocla), and singer, multiple organ failure.
- Giuseppe de Chirico, 84, Italian Olympic sport shooter (1968, 1972, 1976).
- Donna DeEtte Elbert, 90, American mathematician and scientist.
- Xavier Gouyou-Beauchamps, 81, French prefect and director general of France 3.
- Luis Grajeda, 81, Mexican Olympic basketball player (1964, 1968).
- Antonín Kramerius, 79, Czech footballer (Sparta Prague, Hradec Králové, national team).
- Mason Lowe, 25, American professional bull rider, chest injuries sustained during a competition.
- Eduardo Martín Toval, 76, Spanish lawyer and politician, Deputy (1977–1980, 1982–1995) and member of Catalan Parliament (1980–1982).
- Tim Maypray, 30, American football player (Montreal Alouettes, Ottawa Redblacks).
- John J. McKetta, 103, American chemical engineer.
- Mario Monje, 89, Bolivian politician, founder of Communist Party, pneumonia.
- Gabriel Montcharmont, 78, French politician, Deputy (1988–1993, 1997–2002).
- Jerónimo Neto, 51, Angolan handball coach, heart attack.
- Gerald Nordland, 91, American museum director and art critic.
- Miodrag Radovanović, 89, Serbian actor (The Farm in the Small Marsh, The Elusive Summer of '68, Battle of Kosovo).
- Beth Ann Richwine, 59, American art conservator.
- Simone Rignault, 75, French politician Deputy (1993–1997).
- Biraj Kumar Sarma, 70, Indian politician, liver failure.
- Sir Anthony Skingsley, 85, British air chief marshal.
- José Souto, 59, French footballer.
- Espen Thorstenson, 78, Norwegian film director (Dager fra 1000 år, Bak sju hav).
- Thelma Tixou, 75, Mexican vedette and actress (La muchacha del cuerpo de oro, Santa Sangre).
- Bruce Tufeld, 66, American talent agent and manager (Laura Dern, Kelsey Grammer, Rob Lowe), liver cancer.

=== 16 ===
- Malik Mazhar Abbas Raan, 65, Pakistani politician, member of the Provincial Assembly of the Punjab (1997–1999, since 2013), heart attack.
- Gerard Basset, 61, French-born British sommelier, esophageal cancer.
- John C. Bogle, 89, American investor, founder of The Vanguard Group, cancer.
- François Brune, 87, French Catholic prelate and writer.
- Jean Chatillon, 81, Canadian composer.
- Vishnu Hari Dalmia, 94, Indian industrialist (Dalmia Group).
- Lorna Doom, 61, American punk rock bassist (Germs), breast cancer.
- Tom Hausman, 65, American baseball player (New York Mets, Milwaukee Brewers).
- Ahmed Hussein-Suale, 31, Ghanaian journalist, shot.
- Shannon M. Kent, 35, American Navy chief cryptologic technician, bombing.
- Grattan Kerans, 78, American politician, member of the Oregon State Senate (1986–1993).
- Alfred Kunz, 89, German-Canadian composer and conductor, heart disease.
- Fernand Labrie, 81, Canadian endocrinologist and medical researcher.
- Hugh Lewin, 79, South African anti-apartheid activist and writer.
- Erich Lindenlaub, 88, German Olympic cross-country skier.
- Aya Maasarwe, 21, Israeli exchange student, homicide.
- Hank Norton, 91, American college football coach (Ferrum College).
- Bob Pepper, 80, American illustrator.
- Mirjam Pressler, 78, German writer.
- Joyce Reopel, 85, American artist.
- Barry Robinson, 86, English cricketer.
- Heinrich Schaarschmidt, 88, Finnish Olympic sailor (1960).
- Teddi Sherman, 97, American actress and screenwriter.
- Denis Sire, 65, French comics artist and illustrator.
- Barbara Tsakirgis, 64, American archaeologist.
- Rita Vidaurri, 94, American singer.
- Unto Wiitala, 93, Finnish Hall of Fame ice hockey player and official.
- Chris Wilson, 62, Australian musician (Short Cool Ones), pancreatic cancer.
- Yu Min, 92, Chinese nuclear physicist.

=== 17 ===
- Vicente Álvarez Areces, 75, Spanish politician, President of Asturias (1999–2011), Senator (since 2011) and Mayor of Gijón (1987–1999).
- Babiker Awadalla, 101, Sudanese politician, Prime Minister (1969).
- S. Balakrishnan, 69, Indian film score composer and music director, cancer.
- Eddie Benitez, 62, American guitarist.
- Francis Coutou, 71, French Olympic field hockey player (1972).
- Windsor Davies, 88, Welsh actor (It Ain't Half Hot Mum, Carry On England, Never the Twain).
- Steven B. Dodge, 73, American media executive, traffic collision.
- Michael Hardcastle, 85, British writer of children's literature (Soccer Comes First, United!, Half a Team).
- Ashrafunnesa Mosharraf, 74, Bangladeshi politician, kidney disease.
- Joe O'Donnell, 77, American football player (Buffalo Bills).
- Mary Oliver, 83, American poet, Pulitzer Prize winner (1984), lymphoma.
- Mary Jane Osborn, 91, American biochemist and molecular biologist.
- Garfield Owen, 86, Welsh rugby player (Halifax, Keighley, Newport), Parkinson's disease.
- Fred Rae, 87, Australian businessman.
- Gil Carlos Rodríguez Iglesias, 72, Spanish judge, President of the European Court of Justice (1994–2003).
- Léo Rooman, 90, Belgian Olympic hockey player (1952).
- Sam Savage, 78, American novelist (Firmin: Adventures of a Metropolitan Lowlife).
- Turk Schonert, 62, American football player (Cincinnati Bengals, Atlanta Falcons, Stanford Cardinal), heart attack.
- Tara Simmons, 34, Australian musician, breast cancer.
- Helen Smith, 97, American baseball player (All-American Girls Professional Baseball League).
- Daniel C. Striepeke, 88, American makeup artist (Forrest Gump, Saving Private Ryan, Mission: Impossible).
- Sabrina Vlaškalić, 29, Serbian classical guitarist and teacher, traffic collision.
- Anthony Watsham, 94, British-born Zimbabwean Jesuit monk and entomologist.
- John Welwood, 75, American psychologist.
- Keith White, 70, British sailor.
- Fumiko Yonezawa, 80, Japanese theoretical physicist, heart failure.
- Reggie Young, 82, American musician (The Memphis Boys).

=== 18 ===
- Eric Aarons, 99, Australian politician.
- David Abel, 83, Burmese economist and military officer, heart attack.
- Boo, 12, American Pomeranian dog, Facebook celebrity, heart failure.
- Gulab Chandio, 61, Pakistani actor.
- John Coughlin, 33, American figure skater, suicide by hanging.
- Walter Craig, 65, Canadian mathematician.
- Dale Dodrill, 92, American football player (Pittsburgh Steelers).
- Debbie Dowling, 56, English professional golfer.
- Lena Farugia, 67, South African actress (The Gods Must Be Crazy II).
- J. T. Frankenberger, 83, American football player (Edmonton Eskimos, Saskatchewan Roughriders).
- Lamia Al-Gailani Werr, 80, Iraqi archaeologist.
- Gary Gutting, 76, American philosopher.
- Cees Haast, 80, Dutch racing cyclist.
- Reg Hart, 83, New Zealand rugby league player (national team).
- Geoffrey Hewitt, 85, British chemical engineer.
- Sylvia Kay, 82, British actress (Rapture, Wake in Fright, Just Good Friends).
- John Krogh, 80, Norwegian footballer (Rosenborg, national team).
- Robert Morey, 82, American rower, Olympic champion (1956).
- Dan Orlich, 94, American football player (Green Bay Packers).
- Gilles Paquet, 82, Canadian economist.
- Franco Pian, 96, Italian footballer (SPAL, Internazionale, Legnano).
- François Protat, 73–74, Canadian cinematographer (Weekend at Bernie's, Johnny Mnemonic, Joshua Then and Now).
- Brian Stowell, 82, Manx reporter (Manx Radio), linguist, physicist and author, Reih Bleeaney Vanannan winner (2008).
- William A. Thomas, 70, American college football player and coach (Tennessee State Tigers).
- Etienne Vermeersch, 84, Belgian philosopher, euthanasia.
- Ivan Vutsov, 79, Bulgarian football player (Levski Sofia, national team) and manager (Spartak Pleven).
- Ken Warzynski, 70, American basketball player.
- Glen Wood, 93, American racing driver, co-founder of Wood Brothers Racing.
- Peter Zander, 96, German-born British actor (Mystery Submarine, Rotten to the Core, The Return of Mr. Moto), complications from a stroke.

=== 19 ===
- Atin Bandyopadhyay, 85, Bangladeshi writer, stroke.
- Mario Bertoncini, 86, Italian composer, pianist, and music educator.
- Jagjit Singh Chopra, 84, Indian neurologist, complications from a stroke.
- Gert Frank, 62, Danish cyclist, Olympic bronze medalist (1976), heart attack.
- Robert Furlonger, 97, Australian diplomat.
- Nathan Glazer, 95, American sociologist.
- Thomas Habinek, 65, American classical scholar, liver cancer.
- Michael Horne, 76, American quantum physicist.
- Henry Horwitz, 80, American historian.
- Barthélémy Kotchy, 84, Ivorian writer and politician.
- Liang Jingkui, 87, Chinese physical chemist, member of the Chinese Academy of Sciences.
- Ted McKenna, 68, Scottish drummer (The Sensational Alex Harvey Band), haemorrhage during hernia surgery.
- May Menassa, 80, Lebanese writer and journalist, ruptured aneurysm.
- Tony Mendez, 78, American intelligence officer (CIA), subject of Argo, complications from Parkinson's disease.
- Muriel Pavlow, 97, English actress (Malta Story, Doctor in the House, Reach for the Sky).
- Mark Samson, 63, Sri Lankan actor, heart attack.
- Jaswinder Singh Sandhu, 63, Indian politician, cancer.
- Red Sullivan, 89, Canadian ice hockey player (Boston Bruins, New York Rangers) and coach (Pittsburgh Penguins), Alzheimer's disease.
- Henry Sy, 94, Chinese-born Filipino retailer and investor (SM Investments, SM Prime).
- Margaret Wigiser, 94, American baseball player (All-American Girls Professional Baseball League).

=== 20 ===
- Tibor Baranski, 96, Hungarian-born American Righteous Among the Nations.
- Paul Barrett, 78, British music manager and agent.
- Rosemarie Bowe, 86, American model and actress.
- Kenneth Bruffee, 84, American academic.
- Fred Castledine, 81, Australian WAFL footballer (Swan Districts).
- Mauro Cichero, 67, Italian-born Venezuelan footballer (national team), cancer.
- Ian Dewhirst, 82, British historian.
- Klaus Enders, 81, German sidecar racer, world champion (1967, 1969–1970, 1972–1974).
- Evloghios, 83, German-born Italian Orthodox bishop, Primate of the Holy Synod of Milan (since 1990).
- Mustapha Filali, 97, Tunisian politician and union leader, Minister of Agriculture (1956–1957).
- Palma Formica, 90, Italian-born American physician.
- Ging Ginanjar, 54, Indonesian journalist (KBR, Deutsche Welle, BBC).
- Ronald Hayman, 86, British critic and biographer, pneumonia.
- Norman Itzkowitz, 87, American historian.
- Husain Mohammad Jafri, 84, Pakistani historian.
- Dumisani Kumalo, 71, South African politician and diplomat, UN ambassador (1999–2009), asthma attack.
- Jerry Kupcinet, 74, American television director and producer (Judge Judy).
- John Mason, 91, American artist.
- Petre Milincovici, 82, Romanian Olympic rower (1960).
- Mudrooroo, 80, Australian writer.
- François Perrot, 94, French actor (Toutes griffes dehors, Who Wants to Kill Sara?, Le coeur à l'ouvrage).
- Leonardo Quisumbing, 79, Filipino judge, Associate Justice of the Supreme Court (1998–2009).
- Jimmy Rayl, 77, American basketball player (Indiana Hoosiers, Indiana Pacers).
- Lolo Rico, 84, Spanish writer, television director and journalist.
- Don Schaefer, 84, American football player (Philadelphia Eagles).
- Ian Shirley, 78, New Zealand social policy academic (Auckland University of Technology).
- Bobby Shows, 80, American politician, member of the Mississippi House of Representatives (1992–2016).
- William Swan, 90, American actor.
- Brandon Truaxe, 40, Iranian-Canadian computer scientist, fall.
- Andrew G. Vajna, 74, Hungarian-American film producer (Nixon, Terminator 3: Rise of the Machines, Evita), heart attack.
- Mithra Wettimuny, 67, Sri Lankan cricketer.

=== 21 ===
- Marcel Azzola, 91, French accordionist (Jacques Brel).
- Russell Baker, 93, American writer (Growing Up), Pulitzer Prize recipient (1978, 1983), complications from a fall.
- Kaye Ballard, 93, American actress (The Mothers-in-Law, The Doris Day Show) and singer ("Fly Me to the Moon"), kidney cancer.
- Khandaker Abdul Baten, 72, Bangladeshi guerrilla leader and politician, MP (since 2009).
- Raghbir Singh Bhola, 91, Indian field hockey player, Olympic champion (1956) and silver medalist (1960).
- Edwin Birdsong, 77, American funk keyboardist.
- Trond Botnen, 81, Norwegian artist.
- Maxine Brown, 87, American country singer (The Browns), complications from heart and kidney disease.
- Evening Attire, 20, American racehorse.
- Padraic Fiacc, 94, Irish poet.
- Rosa González Román, 76, Chilean journalist and politician, Deputy (1998–2006).
- Henri, Count of Paris, 85, French noble, Orléanist pretender to the French throne (since 1999).
- Göran Högberg, 70, Swedish Olympic athlete (1980).
- Nagendra Jamatia, 71, Indian politician, MLA (1977–1993 and 1998–2008).
- Charles Kettles, 89, American colonel, Medal of Honor recipient.
- Lothar Kobluhn, 75, German footballer (Rot-Weiß Oberhausen).
- Roman Kudlyk, 77, Ukrainian poet and literary critic.
- Mike Ledbetter, 33, American blues musician, complications from epilepsy.
- Andrzej Liss, 68, Polish politician, member of Sejm (2002–2007).
- Richard H. Lyon, 89, American acoustical engineer.
- Ismail Mačev, 59, Macedonian Olympic sprinter (1988), lung cancer.
- Pedro Manfredini, 83, Argentine footballer (Racing Club, Roma, national team).
- Giuseppe Minardi, 90, Italian racing cyclist.
- Lupando Mwape, 68, Zambian politician, Vice-President (2004–2006).
- Leo Paquette, 84, American chemist, Parkinson's disease.
- John Russell, 83, British rower, Olympic silver medalist (1964).
- Emiliano Sala, 28, Argentine footballer (Bordeaux, Nantes, Cardiff City), plane crash.
- Eugene C. Stoddard, 91, American politician.
- Shivakumara Swami, 111, Indian Lingayat spiritual leader and educationist, Seer of Siddaganga Matha (since 1941), lung infection.
- Yıldırım Uran, 63, Turkish football coach, heart attack.
- Harris Wofford, 92, American attorney and politician, member of the U.S. Senate (1991–1995), complications from a fall.

=== 22 ===
- Themos Anastasiadis, 61, Greek journalist and publisher, cancer.
- Koos Andriessen, 90, Dutch politician and economist, Minister of Economic Affairs (1963–1965, 1989–1994).
- Kevin Barnett, 32, American comedian and television writer (Rel, Broad City, The Carmichael Show), pancreatitis.
- Ahmed Imtiaz Bulbul, 63, Bangladeshi musician and political activist, heart attack.
- Peter Calamai, 75, Canadian journalist.
- Leonard Dinnerstein, 84, American historian.
- Andrew Fairlie, 55, Scottish chef, brain cancer.
- James Frawley, 82, American television and film director (The Monkees, The Muppet Movie), Emmy winner (1967), heart attack.
- Éric Holder, 58, French novelist.
- Kin Kaung, 55, Burmese comedian and actor.
- A. Kumarathurai, 79, Sri Lankan politician, founder of Kumarapuram.
- John Lindley, 85, English rugby league player (Wakefield Trinity).
- Bill Mackrides, 93, American football player (Philadelphia Eagles, New York Giants, Pittsburgh Steelers).
- Eileen Massey, 83, Australian cricketer.
- Maureen Murphy, 79, American Olympic swimmer (1956), heart attack.
- Bernarr Notley, 100, English cricketer (Nottinghamshire).
- Kiril Petkov, 85, Bulgarian wrestler, Olympic silver medalist (1964).
- Jean-Maurice Rouquette, 87, French historian.
- John M. Smith, 83, American Roman Catholic prelate, Bishop of Pensacola–Tallahassee (1991–1995) and Trenton (1997–2010).
- Wolfgang Thonke, 80, German military officer.
- Charles Vandenhove, 91, Belgian architect.

=== 23 ===
- Steven H. Amick, 71, American politician, member of the Delaware House of Representatives (1987–1995) and Senate (1995–2009).
- Diana Athill, 101, British literary editor and novelist.
- Richard Bodycombe, 96, American military officer.
- Jack Brinkley, 88, American politician, educator and lawyer, member of the U.S. House of Representatives from Georgia's 3rd district (1967–1983).
- Mervyn Brooker, 64, British cricketer, meningitis.
- Jacqueline Casalegno, 93, French businesswoman.
- Bradnee Chambers, 52, Canadian environmentalist.
- Gary Chelosky, 67, American swimmer.
- Pierre Delaunay, 99, French sports official, General Secretary of UEFA (1955–1960).
- Dick Dolman, 83, Dutch politician, Speaker (1979–1989) and member of the House of Representatives (1970–1990), member of the Council of State (1990–2003).
- J. H. Frappier, 87, American politician.
- Ayşen Gruda, 74, Turkish actress and comedian, pancreatic cancer.
- Nils Hasselmo, 87, Swedish-American academic administrator, President of the University of Minnesota (1988–1997) and the AAU (1998–2006), prostate cancer.
- Wayne H. Holtzman, 96, American psychologist.
- Howard S. Irwin, 90, American botanist.
- Anthony de Jasay, 93, Hungarian economist and philosopher.
- Lin Ching-hsuan, 65, Taiwanese writer, heart attack.
- Jim McKean, 73, Canadian baseball umpire, heart attack.
- Jonas Mekas, 96, Lithuanian-born American film director (Walden, Reminiscences of a Journey to Lithuania, As I Was Moving Ahead Occasionally I Saw Brief Glimpses of Beauty) and poet.
- Hidekichi Miyazaki, 108, Japanese masters athlete, cerebral hemorrhage.
- Oliver Mtukudzi, 66, Zimbabwean musician, complications from diabetes.
- Georges Nasser, 91, Lebanese film director.
- Reijo Nykänen, 88, Finnish Olympic wrestler (1956).
- Norman Orentreich, 96, American dermatologist.
- Aloysius Pang, 28, Singaporean actor (Timeless Love, Young & Fabulous), complications from crushed torso.
- Ryszard Peryt, 71, Polish conductor and librettist.
- Volodymyr Sitkin, 84, Ukrainian Olympic athlete (1956).
- Don Stark, 88, New Zealand cricketer.
- Alexandra Svetlitskaya, 47, Russian footballer (national team).
- Sitaram Rao Valluri, 94, Indian-born American engineer.
- Johnny Walker, 90, Scottish footballer (Wolverhampton Wanderers, Southampton, Reading).
- Adam Watson, 88, Scottish scientist and mountaineer.
- Jean-Pierre Wintenberger, 64, French mathematician.
- Erik Olin Wright, 71, American Marxist sociologist, acute myeloid leukemia.
- Willie York, 74, American homeless activist, diabetes and prostate cancer.

=== 24 ===
- Fernando Sebastián Aguilar, 89, Spanish Roman Catholic cardinal, Bishop of León (1979–1983) and Archbishop of Pamplona and Tudela (1983–2007), stroke.
- Vito Andrés Bártoli, 89, Argentine football player (Atlético Chalaco, Deportivo Cali) and manager (Deportivo Municipal).
- Elio Berhanyer, 89, Spanish fashion designer.
- William R. Bradford, 85, American LDS Church general authority.
- Pierre Delaunay, 99, French sports official, General Secretary of UEFA (1955–1960).
- Peter Eele, 83, English cricket player (Somerset) and umpire.
- Norman Goodman, 95, American municipal clerk (Manhattan).
- Jerard Hurwitz, 90, American biochemist.
- Antonio Marchesano, 88, Uruguayan politician, President of the Chamber of Deputies (1985–1986) and Interior Minister (1986–1989).
- Rosemary Bryant Mariner, 65, American naval aviator, ovarian cancer.
- Jim McCabe, 96, Australian politician, member of the Victorian Legislative Assembly (1964–1967, 1970–1979).
- Hugh McIlvanney, 84, Scottish sports writer (The Sunday Times).
- Alain de Mijolla, 85, French psychoanalyst.
- Robert H. Mounce, 97, American biblical scholar.
- Kiço Mustaqi, 80, Albanian military officer and politician.
- Altino Pinto de Magalhães, 96, Portuguese military officer and politician, President of the Regional Junta of the Azores (1975–1976).
- Gérard Poulain, 82, French Olympic field hockey player (1960).
- Nigel Saddington, 53, English footballer (Doncaster Rovers, Carlisle United, Gateshead), heart disease.

=== 25 ===
- Fatima Ali, 29, Pakistani-born American chef and reality show contestant (Chopped, Top Chef), Ewing's sarcoma.
- Thomas Andretta, 81, American Union business agent and mob associate.
- Roohi Bano, 67, Pakistani actress, kidney failure.
- Steve Bell, 83, American television anchor (Good Morning America, World News This Morning) and academic (Ball State University).
- Jacques Berthelet, 84, Canadian Roman Catholic prelate, Auxiliary Bishop (1986–1996) and Bishop of Saint-Jean-Longueuil (1996–2010).
- Bruce Corbitt, 56, American musician (Rigor Mortis, Warbeast), esophageal cancer.
- Deng Zongjue, 102, Chinese zoologist.
- Albert J. Dunlap, 81, American corporate executive (Scott Paper Company, Coleman Company, Sunbeam Products).
- Erik Dwi Ermawansyah, 22, Indonesian footballer (Bhayangkara, Madura United, PSIS Semarang), heart attack.
- Mick Ewing, 98, American football coach (Chicago Maroons).
- Stanley Hill, 82, American union leader, pneumonia.
- John Jeffries, 89, New Zealand politician and judge.
- Florence Knoll, 101, American architect and furniture designer.
- Donald N. Langenberg, 86, American academic, Chancellor of the University System of Maryland (1990–2002), aortic aneurysm.
- Erwin Lienhard, 62, Swiss racing cyclist.
- Dušan Makavejev, 86, Serbian film director (Man Is Not a Bird, W.R.: Mysteries of the Organism, The Coca-Cola Kid).
- Paweł Małek, 85, Polish Olympic sport shooter.
- Anne Marev, 86, Belgian actress.
- George McMahon, 89, Canadian politician, member of the Legislative Assembly of Prince Edward Island (1976–1987).
- Vigilio Mario Olmi, 91, Italian Roman Catholic prelate, Auxiliary Bishop of Brescia (1986–2003).
- Renzo Pigni, 93, Italian politician, Deputy (1953–1972) and Mayor of Como (1992–1993).
- Meshulam Riklis, 95, Turkish-born American-Israeli businessman.
- Ann Pottinger Saab, 84, American historian.
- Stanley Saunders, 91, Welsh-Canadian musician and educator.
- Boniface Tshosa Setlalekgosi, 91, Botswanan Roman Catholic prelate, Bishop of Gaborone (1981–2005).
- Krishna Sobti, 93, Indian author.
- Jacqueline Steiner, 94, American folk singer-songwriter and social activist.
- Jaume Traserra Cunillera, 84, Spanish Roman Catholic prelate, Bishop of Solsona (2001–2010).
- Michael Trieb, 82, German urban planner.
- Vasillaq Zëri, 66, Albanian footballer (Dinamo Tirana and national team).

=== 26 ===
- Robert Adams VI, 55, American politician, cancer.
- Dale Barnstable, 93, American basketball player (Kentucky Wildcats).
- Duane Benson, 73, American football player (Oakland Raiders) and politician, member of the Minnesota Senate (1980–1994), cancer.
- Patrick Bricard, 78, French actor (The Umbrellas of Cherbourg, Le Distrait, L'Île aux enfants).
- Aleksandr Danilin, 57, Russian Olympic speed skater (1984).
- Boško Đokić, 65, Serbian basketball coach and journalist, heart attack.
- Éric Duyckaerts, 65, Belgian artist.
- Jean Guillou, 88, French composer, organist and pianist.
- John Henderson, 90, New Zealand cricketer (Central Districts).
- Howard Haugerud, 94, American government official.
- Elisabet Helsing, 78, Norwegian nutritional physiologist.
- Nicholas Héroys, 81, English chartered accountant and cricketer.
- Jumani Johansson, 45, Malawian-Swedish possible heir of President Hastings Banda.
- Henrik Jørgensen, 57, Danish Olympic marathon runner (1984, 1988), heart attack.
- Michel Legrand, 86, French composer (The Thomas Crown Affair, Summer of '42, Yentl), conductor and jazz pianist, Oscar winner (1968, 1971, 1983).
- Wilma Lipp, 93, Austrian operatic soprano.
- Mao Dehua, 83, Chinese geographer and politician, Vice Chairman of Xinjiang.
- Jane Millgate, 81, British-born Canadian literary historian.
- Luděk Munzar, 85, Czech actor (The Joke, Poslední propadne peklu), complications from Parkinson's disease.
- Ndaye Mulamba, 70, Congolese footballer (Bantous, Vita Club, national team).
- Mick O'Rourke, 72, Irish Gaelic footballer (Offaly).
- Bill Ortwein, 78, American politician, member of the Tennessee Senate (1977–1985).
- Gerry Plamondon, 95, Canadian ice hockey player (Montreal Canadiens).
- Mary Lou Robinson, 92, American senior judge, U.S. District Court Judge for the Northern District of Texas (1979–2016).
- David Sellar, 77, Scottish heraldry regulator, Lord Lyon King of Arms (2008–2014).
- Eka Tjipta Widjaja, 97, Chinese-born Indonesian banker, founder of the Sinar Mas Group.
- Giuseppe Zamberletti, 85, Italian politician, MP (1968–1994), Minister of Public Works (1987) and of Protezione Civile (1981–1982, 1984–1987).

=== 27 ===
- Paul Balta, 89, French journalist.
- Marshall E. Blume, 77, American economist.
- Joseph Buttigieg, 71, Maltese-American literary scholar.
- Betty Carveth, 93, Canadian baseball player.
- Henry Chapier, 85, Romanian-born French journalist and film critic.
- Nurul Alam Chowdhury, 73, Bangladeshi politician and diplomat.
- Martha E. Church, 88, American geographer and academic administrator.
- Yvonne Clark, 89, American engineer.
- Thomas Jones Enright, 71, American mathematician, complications from Parkinson's disease.
- Sir Reginald Eyre, 94, British politician, MP for Birmingham Hall Green (1965–1987).
- Nina Fyodorova, 71, Russian cross-country skier, Olympic (1976) and world champion (1970, 1974).
- Bill Goodacre, 67, Canadian politician.
- Mike Harrison, 78, English footballer (Chelsea, Blackburn Rovers, Luton Town).
- Emmanuel Hocquard, 78, French poet.
- Peter Magowan, 76, American businessman, co-owner of the San Francisco Giants, CEO and chairman of Safeway, cancer.
- Countess Maya von Schönburg-Glauchau, 60, German socialite, lung cancer.
- Eve Oja, 70, Estonian mathematician.
- Anant Prasad Singh, 92, Indian politician, MLA (1969–1977).
- Brian Toews, 77, Canadian curler.
- Matt Turner, 51, American baseball player (Florida Marlins, Cleveland Indians), Hodgkin's lymphoma.
- Erica Yohn, 88, American actress (An American Tail, Pee-wee's Big Adventure, Corrina, Corrina).

=== 28 ===
- Humberto Akʼabal, 66, Guatemalan K'iche' Maya poet.
- Vere Chappell, 88, American philosopher.
- Ingvald Godal, 84, Norwegian politician, MP (1985–2001).
- Susan Hiller, 78, American artist.
- Jon T. Hougen, 82, American chemist.
- Jørgen Jørgensen, 75, Danish footballer (Holbæk B&I, Sandvikens IF, national team).
- Antônio Petrus Kalil, 93, Brazilian criminal, pneumonia.
- Kim Bok-dong, 92, South Korean women's rights activist, cancer.
- Jurrie Koolhof, 59, Dutch footballer (PSV Eindhoven, Vitesse, national team).
- Mourad Medelci, 75, Algerian politician, Minister of Foreign Affairs (2007–2013).
- Bernard Middleton, 94, British restoration bookbinder.
- Mavis Ngallametta, 75, Australian painter and weaver.
- Noel Rawsthorne, 89, British organist and composer.
- Henry Saavedra, 81, American politician, member of the New Mexico House of Representatives (1977–2015).
- Tahseen Said, 86, Iraqi politician, Mir of the Yazidis (since 1944).
- Yoskar Sarante, 49, Dominican bachata singer, pulmonary fibrosis.
- Otto Schubiger, 94, Swiss ice hockey player (national team), Olympic bronze medalist (1948).
- Ishtvan Sekech, 79, Hungarian-born Russian football player (Avanhard Ternopil, CSKA Moscow) and manager (Temp Shepetivka).
- Wickham Skinner, 94, American business theorist.
- Pepe Smith, 71, Filipino rock musician (Juan de la Cruz Band, Speed, Glue & Shinki, Asin), heart failure.
- John Raymond Smythies, 96, British neuroscientist.
- Alvin Snyder, 82, American journalist and author, complications from Alzheimer's disease.
- Arthur Turner, 98, English footballer (Colchester United, Charlton Athletic).
- Marc Viénot, 90, French banking executive.
- Doris L. Wethers, 91, American pediatrician, complications from a stroke.
- Paul Whaley, 72, American drummer (The Oxford Circle, Blue Cheer), heart failure.
- Dawit Yohannes, 62, Ethiopian politician, Speaker of the House of People's Representatives (1995–2005).

=== 29 ===
- Jane Aamund, 82, Danish author and journalist.
- Dipak Bhattacharjee, 79, Indian politician, MLA (1978–1983).
- Kenneth A. Black Jr., 86, American politician, member of the New Jersey General Assembly (1968–1974).
- Elaine Bonazzi, 89, American opera singer.
- Jean-Pierre Boccardo, 76, French Olympic sprinter (1964, 1968).
- Samuel Charache, 89, American hematologist.
- Jack W. Connell Jr., 81, American politician.
- Hans Normann Dahl, 81, Norwegian illustrator and painter.
- George Fernandes, 88, Indian politician, Minister of Railways (1989–1990) and Defence (1998–2001, 2001–2004), MP (1996–2010), complications from swine flu.
- Jean-Marc Fontaine, 74, French mathematician.
- Fernando Gaitán, 58, Colombian screenwriter (Café, con aroma de mujer, Yo soy Betty, la fea), heart attack.
- Ian George, 84, Australian Anglican prelate, Archbishop of Adelaide (1991–2004).
- Zdravko Grebo, 71, Bosnian legal scholar.
- Andy Hebenton, 89, Canadian ice hockey player (New York Rangers).
- Denis Hunt, 81, English football player (Gillingham, Brentford) and manager (Ashford Town).
- Charles J. Hynes, 83, American lawyer and politician, Kings County District Attorney (1990–2013).
- James Ingram, 66, American R&B singer-songwriter ("Baby, Come to Me", "I Don't Have the Heart", "Yah Mo B There"), Grammy winner (1982, 1985), brain cancer.
- Jin Guozhang, 91, Chinese pharmacologist, psychopathologist and educator.
- Gerri Lawlor, 49, American voice actress (The Sims), co-creator of Simlish.
- Muhammad Arshad Khan Lodhi, 81, Pakistani politician, member of the Provincial Assembly of the Punjab (2013–2018).
- Alf Lüdtke, 75, German historian.
- Antonio Mercader, 74, Spanish-born Uruguayan journalist, lawyer and politician, Minister of Education and Culture (1992–1995, 2000–2002).
- Rudolph Mitchell, 92, American politician.
- Mohammad Nabi Habibi, 73, Iranian politician, Mayor of Tehran (1984–1987), heart attack.
- Aize Obayan, 58, Nigerian academic administrator, Vice Chancellor of Covenant University (2005–2012), cancer.
- Ivan Sergeyevich Obolensky, 93, American financial analyst, naval officer and publisher.
- Egisto Pandolfini, 92, Italian footballer (Fiorentina, Roma, national team).
- Paul Gutama Soegijo, 84, German composer and musician.
- Sanford Sylvan, 65, American baritone, heart attack.
- William Van Alstyne, 84, American legal scholar.
- Jan Wahl, 87, American children's writer, cancer.

=== 30 ===
- Nehanda Abiodun, 68, American rap music activist.
- Stewart Adams, 95, British chemist, developer of ibuprofen.
- Harlan Anderson, 89, American computer engineer, co-founder of Digital Equipment Corporation.
- Jaime Ardila Casamitjana, 100, Colombian writer.
- George Austin, 87, British Anglican priest, Archdeacon of York (1988–1999).
- Maureen Brunt, 90, Australian economist.
- Dara Dotiwalla, 85, Indian cricket umpire.
- Tohru Eguchi, 70, Japanese theoretical physicist, heart failure.
- Diane Gaidry, 54, American actress (The Dogwalker, Loving Annabelle), cancer.
- Alan Hayes, 79, Australian VFL footballer (Richmond).
- Dame Felicity Hill, 103, British Royal Air Force officer, Director of WRAF (1966–1969).
- Saphira Indah, 32, Indonesian actress, lung infection.
- Per Jorsett, 98, Norwegian freelance sports reporter.
- Jadwiga Książek, 79, Polish volleyball player, Olympic bronze medalist (1964, 1968).
- Jean Ledoux, 83, French Olympic rower (1960).
- Murray Loudon, 97, New Zealand Olympic field hockey player (1956).
- Jacques Maillet, 92, French Olympic rower.
- Peter Mikkelsen, 58, Danish football referee, cancer.
- Dick Miller, 90, American actor (Gremlins, The Little Shop of Horrors, Batman: Mask of the Phantasm).
- Douglas Myall, 96, British civil servant and philatelist.
- Shigeichi Nagano, 93, Japanese photographer, renal failure.
- Bernard Nevill, 84, British textile designer.
- B. E. Vijayam, 85, Indian geologist.
- Duncan Weldon, 77, English theatre producer (Private Lives), Tony winner (2002).
- Lori Wilson, 81, American politician, member of the Florida Senate (1973–1978).

=== 31 ===
- Harold Bradley, 93, American Hall of Fame country musician.
- Fred Cummings, 87, American theoretical physicist.
- Candice Earley, 68, American actress (All My Children), multiple system atrophy.
- A. Ernest Fitzgerald, 92, American engineer and government whistleblower.
- David Hawkins, 81, British Royal Air Force officer.
- Kálmán Ihász, 77, Hungarian footballer (Vasas, national team).
- Ron Joyce, 88, Canadian businessman, co-founder of Tim Hortons.
- Pablo Larios, 58, Mexican footballer (Cruz Azul, Puebla, national team), complications from intestinal occlusion.
- Johnny Lion, 77, Dutch singer and actor, lung cancer.
- Pierre Nanterme, 59, French business executive (Accenture), colon cancer.
- Nancy B. Reich, 94, American musicologist.
- Norman K. Risjord, 87, American historian and author.
- Georges Sarre, 83, French politician, Deputy (1981–2002).
- Graham Stilwell, 73, British tennis player, neuro-muscular disorder.
- Don Storm, 86, American politician, member of the Minnesota Senate (1983–1991).
- Andrzej Wieckowski, 73, Polish-born American chemist.
- William Winegard, 94, Canadian politician, MP (1984–1993).
