= Frappier =

Frappier is a surname. Notable people with the surname include:

- Armand Frappier (1904–1991), Canadian physician, microbiologist, and expert on tuberculosis
- J. H. Frappier (1931–2019), American politician
- Jill Frappier (born 1944), British-Canadian voice actress
- José Hazim Frappier (born 1951), Dominican Republic physician, academic and politician
- Roger Frappier (born 1945), Canadian producer, director, editor, actor, and screenwriter

== Other ==
- Bad News Brown, musician; born Paul Frappier
- Prix Armand-Frappier, an award by the Government of Quebec, part of the Prix du Québec
