= Rosa González =

Rosa González is the name of:

- Rosa A. González, Puerta Rican nurse
- Rosa González Román, Chilean politicians
- Rosa Torre González, Mexican politician
