= Viénot =

Viénot or Vienot is a surname, and may refer to:

- Andrée Viénot (1901–1976), French politician
- Édouard Viénot (1804–1872), French portrait painter
- Jean-Baptiste Bernard Viénot de Vaublanc (1761–1812), French army officer
- Jimmy Vienot (born 1995), French kickboxer
- Marc Viénot (1928–2019), French banking executive
- Raphaël Vienot (1804–1855), French army officer killed in the Crimean War
- Vincent-Marie Viénot, Count of Vaublanc (1756–1845), French royalist politician, writer and artist
