= Melvin L. Moeschberger =

American biostatistician (1940–2019)

Melvin Lee Moeschberger (June 26, 1940 – January 9, 2019) was an American biostatistician.

== Early life ==
Moeschberger was a native of Berne, Indiana, born to parents Howard and Luella. He studied mathematics and chemistry at Taylor University and completed a master's degree at Ohio University before earning a doctorate in statistics from North Carolina State University, followed by postdoctoral work at the University of North Carolina. He taught biostatistics at Ohio State University for three decades, and retired from the University of Missouri after ten years. Moeschberger was a fellow of the American Association for the Advancement of Science and the American Statistical Association. He died in Fishers, Indiana.
