= Bob Price (Nevada politician) =

American politician

Member of the Nevada General Assembly from the 17th district
- In office 1974–2002

Personal details
- Born: May 23, 1936 DeLand, Florida, United States
- Died: January 4, 2019 (aged 82)
- Party: Democratic
- Spouse: Nancy Bogan Price
- Profession: electrician

Robert Earle Price, Jr. (May 23, 1936 – January 4, 2019), was an American politician who was a Democratic member of the Nevada General Assembly for 28 years from 1974 to 2002. He was an electrician.

Price was known as a gregarious liberal with a colorful personality. During his time in the Assembly, he chaired a number of committees including the Committee on Taxation and was a member of the Ways and Means Committee. He helped win passage of legislation to eliminate Nevada’s grocery tax and is also remembered for working to pass legislation to rename Nevada State Route 375 the "Extraterrestrial Highway."

"It can truthfully be said that Bob Price’s legacy in the Nevada Assembly includes tax-cutting, extraterrestrials, brothels, a near-fatal heart attack, an office squatter named Merlin, guitar sing-a-longs in chambers, extra pay for harried staffers, government transparency and ethics, equal rights and constitutional protections," reported the Las Vegas Review-Journal upon his death. "The word 'character' might not be big enough to describe him." He also had a park named after him “Robert E. “Bob” price rec center “ Price died on January 4, 2019, at the age of 82.
