= Viktoria Suchantseva =

- Вікторія Суханцева
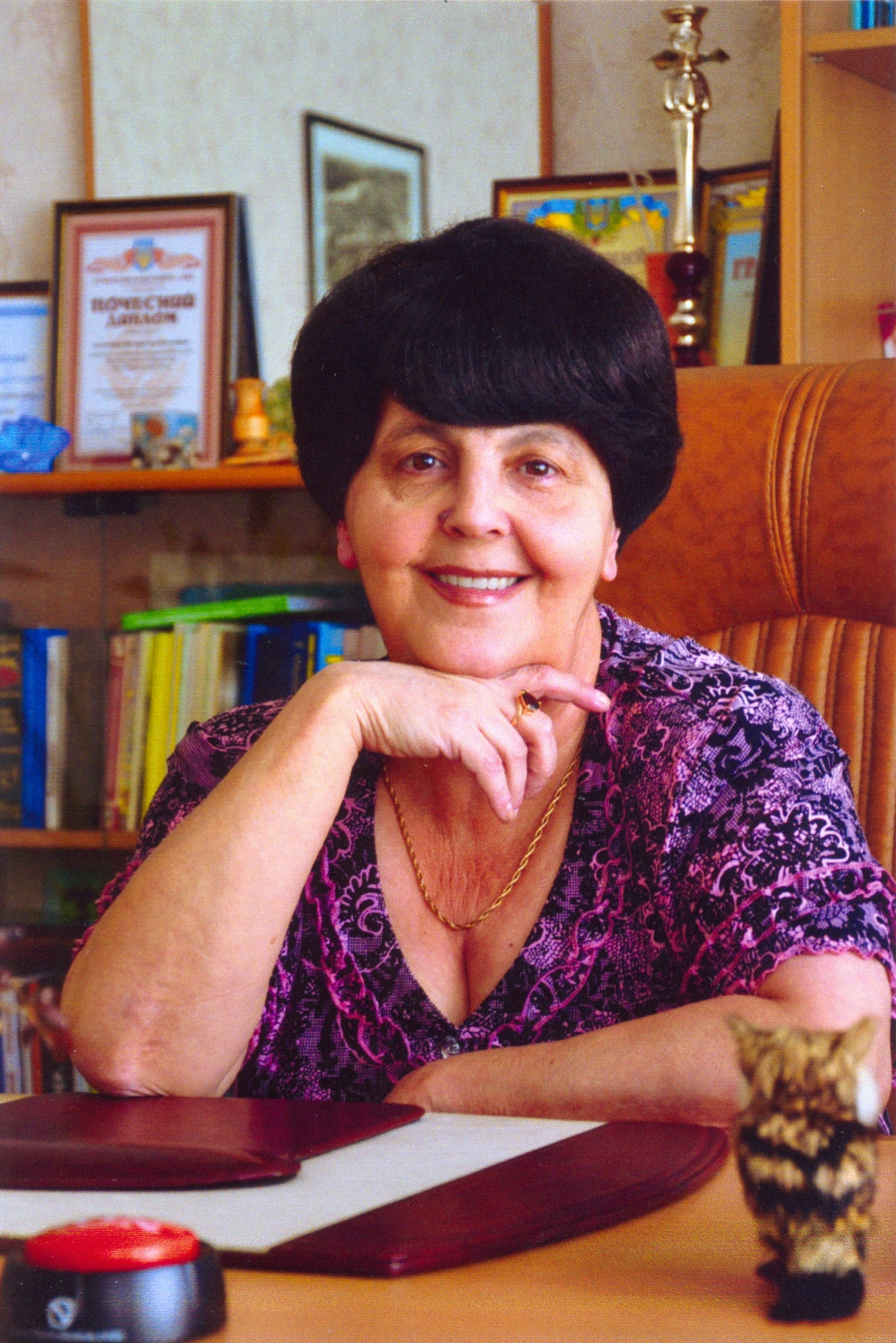
- Born: January 19, 1949; Voroshilovgrad
- Died: January 10, 2019 (aged 69); Luhansk

Viktoria Suchantseva (Ukrainian: Вікторія Суханцева, 19 January 1949 – 10 January 2019) was a Ukrainian philosopher, aesthetician, culturologist, poet and writer, founder of Ukrainian philosophy of music school of thought.

== Biography ==
Viktoria Suchantseva was born in Luhansk (formerly Voroshilovgrad). Her father was a deputy Editor in chief of “Voroshilovgrad truth” (“Voroshilovgradskaya pravda”) newspaper, mother was a music teacher. From 1964 to 1968 she was a student of Gnessin Moscow Special School of Music (piano as a major study). From 1968–1973 she was a student of Piano Department of Gnessin Russian Academy of Music. From 1969–1973 she was a student of Maxim Gorky Literature Institute (Poetry Department). Her poems were published in “Iynost’” magazine, her own poetry collection was published later.

In 1970 she married Evgeniy Kozlov, who was an alumnus of Moscow State University Philosophy Faculty. From 1974–1976 she worked as a teacher at Voroshilovgrad State Music School (piano class). Then from 1976–1994 she was a lecturer at Voroshilovgrad State Pedagogical University named after Taras Shevchenko. Head of the Theory, History of Music and Playing Musical Instruments Chair, Dean of Music and Musical Culture Department.

In 1984 she defended candidate dissertation under the title: “Epistemological analysis of the role of a rhythm in the process of artistic creation” and was awarded Ph. D. degree in Philosophical Sciences, specialization: Aesthetics. In 1991 she defended doctoral dissertation under the title: “Category of time in music” and was awarded D. Sc. degree in Philosophical Sciences, specialization: Aesthetics.

From 1994–1997 she was Rector of Luhansk Postgraduate Education Institute, from 1997–2000, professor of Philosophy Department of Volodymyr Dahl East Ukrainian National University and from 2000–2013, Head of the World Philosophy and Aesthetics Chair of Volodymyr Dahl East Ukrainian National University. Since 2001 she has been Dean of Philosophy Department of Volodymyr Dahl East Ukrainian National University and since 2003, head of the specialized Ph. D. and D. Sc. science council D 29.051.05 (specialization: Aesthetics, Philosophical Anthropology, Philosophy of Culture).

In 2010 she awarded with the title of Honored Scientist of Ukraine. Suchantseva was a Head of the World Philosophy and Aesthetics Chair, Head of the Institute of Philosophy and Psychology of Volodymyr Dahl East Ukrainian National University.

== Scientific activities ==
Suchantseva’s major scientific interests are focused on Philosophy of Culture, Philosophy of Music and Aesthetics. More than three hundred of her scientific works are devoted to these subjects. In these studies philosophical aspects of cultural analysis are described. Her unique language and writing manner were easily capturing reader’s attention. She was a brilliant speaker, who was able to speak easily and accessibly on complex philosophical issues.
