= Mardi Dungey =

Australian macroeconomist (1966–2019)

Mardi Dungey FASSA
- Born: 1966
- Died: 12 January 2019 (aged 52–53)

Academic background
- Education: University of Tasmania
- Alma mater: Australian National University
- Thesis: International influences on the Australian economy (1998)

Mardi Helen Dungey FASSA (1966 – 12 January 2019) was an Australian macroeconomist.

== Birth and education ==
Dungey was born in 1966. She graduated from the University of Tasmania with a BEc in 1988. She won a cadetship with the Reserve Bank of Australia, working there until 1994, when she commenced her PhD at the Australian National University (ANU). She completed her thesis titled "International influences on the Australian economy" in 1998.

== Career ==
Her first academic position was a five-month stint as visiting fellow in the Department of Econometrics and Statistics at the ANU. She moved to La Trobe University as senior lecturer from 1998 to 2000, before returning to ANU in 2000 as Fellow in the Research School of Pacific and Asian Studies' Economics Department and senior lecturer at ANU itself.

In 2005 she moved to the University of Cambridge as deputy director of Cambridge Endowment for Research in Finance. She returned to the University of Tasmanian to take up the position of professor of economics and finance in 2008, remaining there until her death. From 2008 to 2019 she also held adjunct positions at the University of Cambridge and ANU.

Apart from her university research and teaching roles, Dungey served as co-editor of the Economic Record (journal of the Economic Society of Australia) and associate editor of both the Journal of Applied Econometrics and Journal of Banking and Finance. She also developed a financial literacy program for use in primary schools in Tasmania.

Dungey was elected a Fellow of the Academy of the Social Sciences in Australia in 2013.

Dungey died on 12 January 2019.
