= Xavier Gouyou-Beauchamps =

French entertainment executive (1937–2019)

- Born: 25 April 1937; Paris, France
- Died: 15 January 2019 (aged 81)
- Occupation: Entertainment executive

Xavier Gouyou-Beauchamps (25 April 1937 – 15 January 2019) was a French executive in the entertainment industry.

== Biography ==
Gouyou-Beauchamps studied at the École Nationale d'Administration from 1962 to 1964, and then became cabinet director for Loiret after his graduation. He served as deputy chief to the cabinet for France's Ministry of Finance and chief of staff in the cabinet of the French Ministry of National Education.

After his political career, Gouyou-Beauchamps became president of Sofirad, overseeing private radio companies such as Radio Monte Carlo and Sud Radio. From 1977 to 1984, he was president of France Télévisions. From 1981 to 1986, he was an adviser for the Ministry of Culture and Communication and helped the government prepare for the privatization of TF1. After that, he became president of Télédiffusion de France. In 1996, while serving as general director for France 3, the Conseil supérieur de l'audiovisuel elected him as president of French Télévision again. In 2000, Gouyou-Beauchamps founded Antalis TV S.A., which became a direct competitor of TDF. However, it was later bought out by TDF. He would later become president of Cap 24 from 2008 until its closure in 2010, and was subsequently president of Citizenside.

Xavier Gouyou-Beauchamps died on 15 January 2019.
