= Antonio Torres Millera =

Spanish politician (1964–2019)

Vice President of the People's Party of Aragon
- In office 9 November 2008 – 5 January 2019
- President: Luisa Fernanda Rudi

Member of the Aragonese Corts
- In office 25 May 2003 – 5 January 2019

Mayor of Sariñena
- In office 4 July 1999 – 16 June 2007
- Preceded by: Ángel Mirallas Marías
- Succeeded by: Lorena Canales Miralles

Sariñena City Councilor
- In office 22 May 1991 – 5 January 2019

Personal details
- Born: 20 August 1964; Huesca, Aragon, Spain
- Died: 5 January 2019 (aged 54); Huesca, Aragon, Spain
- Political party: People's Party of Aragon

Antonio Torres Millera (20 August 1964 – 5 January 2019) was a Spanish politician and a member of the People's Party of Aragon. He served as a deputy of the Aragonese Corts, the regional parliament, from 2003 until his death in 2019. He was also second Vice President of the Aragonese Corts at the time of his death in 2019.

Torres died in office from a heart attack on 5 January 2019, at the age of 54. He was survived by his wife and two daughters.
