= Eugene C. Stoddard =

American politician (1927–2019)

Member of the South Carolina House of Representatives for the 16th district
- In office 1971–1998

Personal details
- Born: Eugene Creighton Stoddard; November 10, 1927 Gray Court, South Carolina
- Died: January 21, 2019 (aged 91) Fountain Inn, South Carolina
- Party: Democratic
- Spouse: Sara Joyce Armstrong Stoddard
- Children: 5
- Occupation: farmer, businessman

Eugene Creighton Stoddard (November 10, 1927 – January 21, 2019) was an American politician in the state of South Carolina. He served in the South Carolina House of Representatives as a member of the Democratic Party from 1971 to 1998, representing Laurens County, South Carolina. For a number of years he chaired the South Carolina House of Representatives Education and Public Works Committee. He was a farmer and businessman.
