= Nicholas Héroys =

English cricketer and chartered accountant (1937–2019)

Nicholas Héroys (1 April 1937 – 26 January 2019) was an English chartered accountant and amateur cricketer who played in one first-class cricket match for Cambridge University Cricket Club in 1960.

Héroys was born at Marylebone in London, the son of Vladmir and Sheila Héroys, and educated at Tonbridge School in Kent. After leaving school he was commissioned in the Royal Leicestershire Regiment and completed his National Service before going up to Cambridge University. He played cricket and rackets at school and cricket for teams at University. His only appearance for the University team itself came in a first-class match against Hampshire County Cricket Club in May 1960.

Professionally Héroys worked for printing company McCorquodale, joining the company board in 1978, becoming their Finance Director and, in 1985, chairman of Wisden Group after McCorquodale bought the group. He finished his career as Finance Director of Slaughter and May, was a General Committee member of Kent County Cricket Club for over 30 years starting in 1970 and was President of the club in 1995–96. He played club cricket for Old Tonbridgians, captaining the team to five finals of The Cricketer Cup.

Héroys was married to his wife, Susan, for more than 50 years and had two sons. He died in January 2019 aged 81.
