= Michael Trieb =

German urban planner (1936–2019)

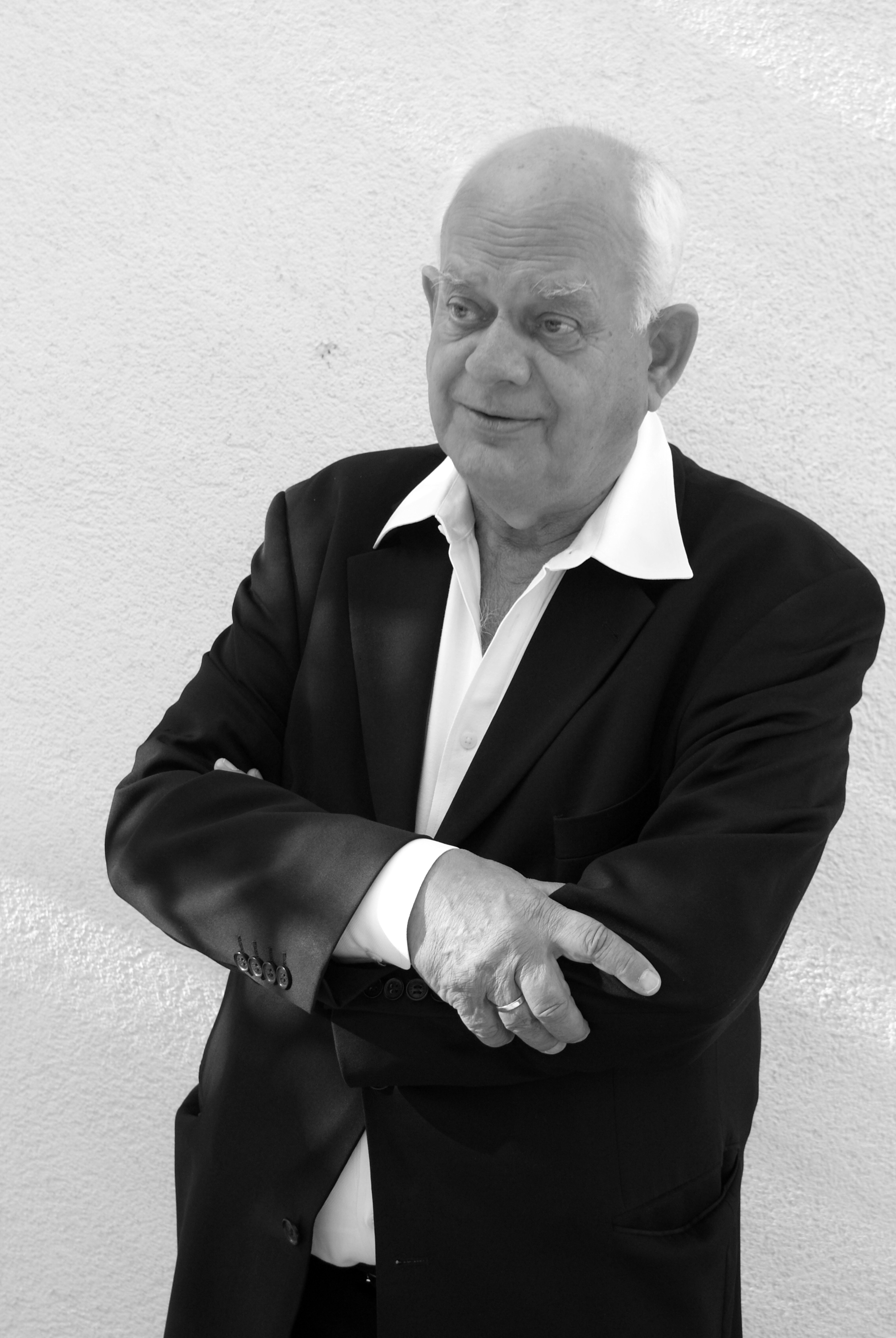
- Born: 1936
- Died: 25 January 2019 (aged 82–83)
- Occupation: Architect

Michael Trieb (1936 – 25 January 2019) was a German architect, urban planner (SRL), and university professor. He was head of the Department of Urban Design at the Urban Planning Institute at the University of Stuttgart and was Managing Director of the ISA Group - ISA Internationales Stadtbauatelier.

== Life ==
Michael Trieb studied architecture and urban planning at the Technical University of Stuttgart and graduated in 1964. In parallel to his academic training, he managed urban planning projects in Paris and architectural construction projects in Stuttgart from 1959 to 1964. From 1964 to 1967, he was an architect and partner in the architectural office BTW Brunnert, Trieb und Wössner. From 1967 to 1971, Trieb worked as a district planner and assistant to the City Planner in the Stuttgart City Planning Department. He was a partner in the planning firm URBA from 1971 to 1979. He earned his doctorate in urban design in 1972 and qualified for a professorship in urban design and urban development planning in 1975. Michael Trieb also began his academic teaching career in 1971 and was named Professor in the Urban Planning Institute at the University of Stuttgart in 1976. Three years later, the University named him Chair of Urban Design and Urban Development. He founded the planning studio Stadtbauatelier in 1979. In 2007, the office evolved into the think-and-act tank ISA Internationales Stadtbauatelier, where he remains a partner to this day.

== Research ==
Trieb’s research has focussed on anthropocentric, humanistic principles for urban planning, developing what is called Urban City Design (Stadtgestaltung) based on the philosophy of human-centered design.

- Urban philosophy: Investigation of both tangible and intangible aspects of a city and developing a holistic, contemporary urban philosophy, based on a pragmatic view of man.
- Urban development planning: Practical consequences of this urban philosophy as an anthropocentric basis for urban development, urban management and urban renewal as the means and instruments of urban development planning.
- Urban design: Establishment of urban city design as a separate field within urban planning, development and application of a model of understanding and developing urban design within urban planning practice.
- Urban architecture: Working on urban architecture as a holistic design problem, analogous to the architecture of individual buildings. Analysis of the building blocks and principles of composition in urban architecture and their application from the urban design concept to design regulations.
- City planning: Planning transparency through visual representations understandable by the general public, planners and decision makers to ensure accountability for planning processes and their results.

As part of his step-by-step approach to applied research, Trieb has focused on presenting, putting up for discussion his theories in publications and academic lectures, and speaking at professional conferences in Germany, Switzerland, France, Italy, Denmark, Korea, China, Taiwan, Brazil, Chile and the U.S. Trieb puts his theories into practice by implementing projects in urban planning in countries around the world, such as Germany, Brazil, Chile, Korea and China.

== Practice ==
In his practice, Trieb was and is active as an architect, urban design consultant, design competition judge and a practising urban planner working for the public sector. After a thorough training in the “Stuttgart School of Architecture”, he worked mainly as an architect, until he turned his focus to urban planning.

He has served as an urban development and design consultant for various German state governments as well as a consultant for the urban development of Mecca and Medina on behalf of the Saudi Arabian government. In addition he is a member of the Guangzhou (China) Urban Planning Commission.

As an urban planner, he has worked o in the cities of Stuttgart, Heilbronn, Ulm, Würzburg, Jena, Potsdam, Stralsund, Lübeck and Flensburg, Paris and Cergy-Pontoise, Salvador de Bahía, Santiago de Chile and Talcahuano, Seoul, as well as Beijing, Shanghai and Guangzhou. Substantive and methodological key projects have included the city development plans for Potsdam and Talcahuano, master plans for Santiago de Chile, Stuttgart, Rendsburg and Konstanz city image plans for the cities of Leonberg, Ludwigsburg, Lübeck and Neubrandenburg, and the New Town planning for Shanghai. Today, Michael Trieb remains active as a partner in ISA Internationales Stadtbauatelier.

== Writings and lectures ==
Michael Trieb has published numerous books and writings on urban planning, urban development planning, and urban design.

Books (Selection)

- 1974 Stadtgestaltung – Theorie und Praxis (Urban City Design - Theory and Praxis). In Bauwelt-Fundamente Band 43. Düsseldorf 1974, Bertelsmann Verlagsgruppe GmbH, ISBN 3-570-08643-7
- 1974 Mensch und Stadtgestalt. Beiträge zu Aufgaben und Problemen der Stadtgestaltung (Man and urban cityscape. Articles about tasks and problems of urban city design). (Hrsg. mit A. Markelin). Stuttgart 1974, Deutsche Verlags-Anstalt, ISBN 3-421-02360-3
- 1976 Stadtbild in der Planungspraxis. Stadtgestaltung vom Flächennutzungsplan bis zur Ortsbausatzung als Element der kommunalen Arbeit (Urban cityscape in the planning practice. Urban City Design from zoning plan to building ordinance as an element of the local work). (Hrsg. mit A .Markelin).Stuttgart 1976, Deutsche Verlags-Anstalt, ISBN 3-421-02489-8
- 1985 Erhaltung und Gestaltung des Ortsbildes. Denkmalpflege, Ortsbildplanung und Baurecht (Preservation and design of the townscape. Cultural heritage preservation, planning of the townscape and building law) (Hrsg. mit A.Schmidt, S.Paetow, F.Buch, R.Strobel). Stuttgart, Berlin [West], Köln [u.a.], Kohlhammer Verlag 1985, ISBN 3-17-008936-6

Publications (Selection)

- 1974 Rahmenplan zur Stadtgestaltung – Beispiel Leonberg (Master plan for urban city design – Example of Leonberg). In Stadtbauwelt 41, Bertelsmann Verlag, Berlin 1974
- 1979 L`architecture de la ville et l `espace public (The architecture of the city and the public space). In Icomos Monumentum Vol. XVIII-XIX, Paris 1979
- 1981 Stadtgestalt – Lebensraum für Menschen(Urban cityscape – Living space for the people). In Innenministerium Baden-Württemberg (Hrsg.)Stadtgestalt und Architektur Städtebauliches Kolloquium Stuttgart 1981
- 1981 Stadtgestalt und Stadtgestaltung (Urban cityscape and urban city design). In DISP Nr. 63 Institut für Orts-, Regional- und Raumplanung ETH Zürich 1981
- 1982 Stadtgestaltung – Aufgaben für Morgen (Urban city design – Tasks for tomorrow). (Hrsg.). Städtebauliches Fachgespräch am 27.08.1982 an der Universität Stuttgart, Band 40 von Arbeitsbericht, Stuttgart 1982
- 1982 Dorfgestaltung im Schwarzwald - Hinweise zum Entwurf regionaler Dorfarchitektur (Village design in the Black Forest - Advice for the design of regional village architecture). (mit A. Schmidt) in Dorfentwicklung - Beiträge zur funktionsgerechten Gestaltung der Dörfer(Hrsg.Ministerium für Ernährung, Landwirtschaft, Umwelt und Forst Baden Württemberg), Stuttgart 1982
- 1986 Städtebauliche Erneuerung und Stadtgestaltung in Baden Württemberg (Urban modernization and urban city design in Baden-Württemberg). (Hrsg.).Forschungsbericht SI Universität Stuttgart im Auftrag des Innenministeriums Baden-Württemberg 1986
- 1987 Les espaces urbains: le traitement des espaces urbaines a Lübeck et a Mölln (The public Spaces: Treatment of public areas in Lübeck and Mölln). In Permanence et Actualites des Bastides – Les cahiers de la section francaise de L`ICOMOS. Montauban 1987
- 1987 Gestaltungsprinzipien im Stadtbild (Design principles in the cityscape). In Gestalteter Lebensraum: Gedanken zur örtlichen Raumplanung - Festschrift für Friedrich Moser. TU Wien 1987, ISBN 978-3-85452-105-1
- 1988 Stadtästhetik als soziale Aufgabe (Aesthetics of the city as a social task). In Herausforderung Stadt – Aspekte einer Humanökologie (Hrsg. J.Winter, J.Mack), Frankfurt/M, Berlin 1988
- 1992 Urban Planning. In Korean Architect, Korean Institute of registered architects. June 1992
- 1992 Cities from an ecological viewpoint – Environment and Cities. Seoul 1992 (Korean Institute of Registered Architects)
- 1995 The Balance between Continuity and Change – A Challenge for the historical building as well as for the historical city. In National Cheng Kung University, (Hrsg.) Conservation and Reuse of Historical Buildings International Symposium Khaohsiung/tw 1995
- 1995 Stadtwege –Zufallsgestalt oder Gestaltungsaufgabe(Paths in the city – a random design or a design task). In Der Architekt –BDA 1995, ISSN 0003-875X
- 1995 Grundlagen des Stadtgestalterischen Entwerfens (Basic principles of urban designing). (Hrsg. mit E.Hörmann). Ein Seminarbericht des Städtebau-Institutes der Universität Stuttgart, Stuttgart 1995 (14.Auflage)
- 1997 Metamorphosis of Traditional Life Style in Moderrn Housing Culture. In Korean Landscape Architecture 6/1997
- 2000 Architektur und Weltanschauung (Architecture and conviction). (Hrsg.). Ein Seminarbericht des Städtebau-Institutes der Universität Stuttgart, Stuttgart 2000
- 2004 Ziele, Konzepte, Realitäten (Objektives, concepts, realities). In H.Bott, E.Uhl, Perspektiven des Urbanen Raumes, IZKT Universität Stuttgart 2004
- 2006 From Philosophy to Practice – Protection, Renewal and Development of Cities. In Stadtbauatelier, Peking 2006
- 2014 From Economic Miracle to Quality of Life: Urban Development Experiences & tasks of Practice and Research. In Lee, S.-J. Lee, M.Trieb, Y.Zhang, D.Leyh, Learning from two cultures-Urban Development, Renewal, Preservation and Management in Europe and Asia. China Architecture & Building Press, Peking 2014, ISBN 978-7-112-15052-6

== Publications about him ==
- Ir Heru Wibowo Poerbo:Urban Design Guidelines as Design Control Instruments with a case study of the Silver Triangle Superblock, Jakarta Doctoral Dissert, Kaiserslautern 2001
- Kostof, Spiro:The City Shaped Urban Patterns and Meanings throughout History, Bulfinch Press, London 1991, ISBN 0-8212-2016-0
- Heigl, Franz:Stadtgestaltung, Wien 1985, ISBN 3-214-91155-4
- Kohlsdorf, Maria Elaine:Breve Historico de Espaco Urbano como Campo Disciplinar, In: Farret, Ricardo Libanez o espaco de cidade, São Paulo 1985
- Voigt, Andreas:Gestaltung der Bebauungsstrukturen Wiens durch räumliche Modelle, In: Österreichischer Kunst- u. Kulturverlag, Wien 1997, ISBN 3-85437-088-1
- Reicher, Christa:Städtebauliches Entwerfen, (2.Auflage) Wiesbaden 2013, ISBN 978-3-8348-2645-9
- Hierzegger, Heiner:Räumliches Leitbild der Landeshauptstadt Graz, Magistrat Graz, Stadtplanungsamt, Graz 2004
- Kohlsdorf, Maria Elaine:A Aprensao da Forma da Cidade, Brasilia 1996, ISBN 85-230-0388-6
- Stuttner, Dolores:Die Notwendigkeit einer durchdachten Stadtplanung zum Ortsbildschutz, Grin Verlag, Wien 2009
