= Beth Ann Richwine =

American art conservator (1959–2019)

Beth Ann Richwine (April 25, 1959 – January 15, 2019) was an art conservator. She worked as an Objects Conservator at the Smithsonian National Museum of American History for 30 years.

== Early life and education ==
Richwine was born in Newport News, VA and graduated from York High School in 1977. She went on to graduate from University of Mary Washington in 1981 and earn her master's in art conservation from SUNY Buffalo.

== Career ==
Richwine started as an Objects Conservator at the National Museum of American History in 1987. She spent more than 300 hours cleaning the dioramas and mechanisms of the Great History Clock of America in an effort to restore it to a working state.

== Personal life ==
Richwine was married to Randall Cleaver and resided in Takoma Park, Maryland. Outside of her work as a conservator, Richwine had many creative hobbies including ceramics, cheesemaking, and pysanska-style eggs.
