= Elisabet Helsing =

Norwegian nutritional physiologist (1940–2019)

Dr Elisabet Helsing DrMedSci
- Born: 3 June 1940
- Died: 26 January 2019 (aged 78)
- Occupation: Nutritional physiologist

Dr Elisabet Helsing DrMedSci (3 June 1940 – 26 January 2019) was a Norwegian nutritional physiologist.

Helsing attended the University of Oslo, and subsequently wrote on and campaigned for natural breastfeeding.

She joined the World Health Organization in 1984, working at their regional office for Europe on matters related to nutrition, until 1996.

She served as president of the 8th European Nutrition Conference; and as president of the Federation of European Nutrition Societies from 1999 to 2003.

She was a founder of the Norwegian support group for mothers, Ammehjelepen, whose first meeting was held in her house in 1968, and which inspired the Swedish equivalent. She is an honorary member of both.

She was given the Mediterranean Diet Foundation's first Grande Covian Award in 1996, and received the Norwegian King's Medal of Merit in Gold, for services to the people in 2003.

Helsing died on 26 January 2019.
