= Eve Oja =

Estonian mathematician (1948–2019)

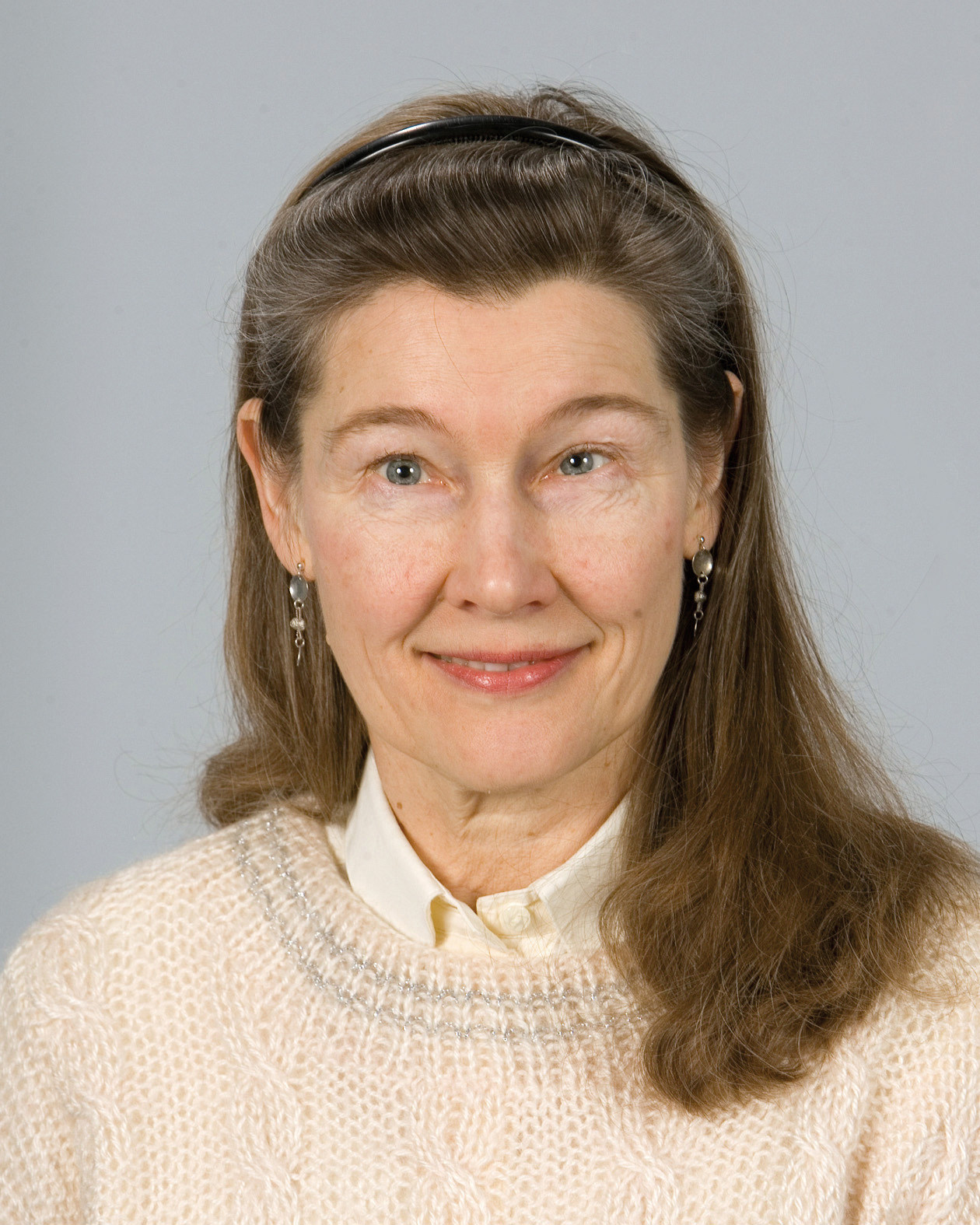

Eve Oja (10 October 1948 – 27 January 2019) was an Estonian mathematician specializing in functional analysis. She was a professor at the University of Tartu.

== Early life and education ==
Oja was born in Tallinn and studied at the Tartu State University (now the University of Tartu), completing her undergraduate studies in 1972 and earning a doctorate (Cand.Sc.) in 1975. Her dissertation, Безусловные шаудеровы разложения в локально выпуклых пространствах (Unconditional Schauder decompositions in locally convex spaces) was supervised by Gunnar Kangro.

== Career ==
Oja was on the faculty of the University of Tartu since 1975, with a year (1977-78) teaching in Mali, and another (1980-81) doing postdoctoral research at Aix-Marseille University in France. She served several terms as head of the Institute of Pure Mathematics at the university, and from 2009-15 she headed the Estonian School of Mathematics and Statistics.

She was editor-in-chief of the mathematics journal Acta et Commentationes Universitatis Tartuensis de Mathematica since 1998.

== Recognition ==
Oja was elected to the Estonian Academy of Sciences in 2010. She was also a member of the European Academy of Sciences and Arts.

== Death ==
Oja died on 27 January 2019.
