= Max Deen Larsen =

Austrian educator (1943–2018)

Max Deen Larsen (March 6, 1943 – January 12, 2018) was founder and director of the de:Franz-Schubert-Institut in Baden, Austria.

== Early life ==
Max Deen Larsen was born on March 6, 1943, in Richfield, Utah, to Maida and Max Larsen. He majored in German and religion at Reed College. His thesis was titled "Paradox and Pointe in Friedrich Schlegel's Fragments" under professor Ottomar Rudolf. He graduated with a master's degree from Yale University. He graduated with a Master of Arts and Doctor of Philosophy from the University of Vienna.

== Career ==
Larsen taught poetry at the Yale School of Music and the Vienna Music Academy. He taught history of opera at Stanford University in Austria. He was adjunct professor of music at the University of Alberta in Canada.

In 1973, Larsen moved to Baden bei Wien. He founded and was director of the de:Franz-Schubert-Institut.

== Personal life ==
Larsen married Verena. They had four children, Evelyn, Rainer, Gwendolyn and Brent.

Larsen died of a pulmonary embolism on January 12, 2018, in Baden bei Wien. He was buried at the Municipal Parish Cemetery (Stadtpfarrfriedhof Baden) in Baden.
