= Rajesh Ghodge =

Indian cricketer (1975–2019)

Personal information
- Full name: Rajesh Damodar Ghodge
- Born: 15 January 1975; Margao, Goa, India
- Died: 13 January 2019 (aged 43); Margao, Goa, India
- Source: Cricinfo, 25 December 2019

Rajesh Ghodge (15 January 1975 – 13 January 2019) was an Indian cricketer who played in two first-class and eight List A matches for Goa between 1997 and 2005. In January 2019, he collapsed while playing in a local cricket tournament, and died later in hospital.
