= Palma Formica =

Italian-born American physician (1928–2019)

- Born: June 14, 1928; Italy
- Died: January 20, 2019 (aged 90); East Brunswick, New Jersey, U.S.
- Occupation: Doctor
- Known for: First woman president of Middlesex Medical Society of New Jersey

Palma E. Formica (June 14, 1928 – January 20, 2019) was an Italian-born American physician who was known for her work in the field of medicine. She became a well-known female doctor during a period when it was rare for women to become doctors.

== Background ==
Palma Formica grew up in Italy in a traditional family. From an early age, Palma showed an interest in medicine. Following her passion, she pursued higher education to become a doctor. She applied to universities in the United States of America in the early 1960s; however, she remained in Italy to attend the University of Rome. As Palma was not only a Catholic but also a woman, it was difficult for her to get accepted into American institutions due to their quotas at the time. Later, she married and had three children.

Formica died in East Brunswick, New Jersey on January 20, 2019, at the age of 90.

== Career ==
Palma Formica began her career in internal medicine, but later switched to family medicine. She also advises on vaccinations in The Little Sting that Could Save your Life, specifically Hepatitis B. She opened her own practice in Old Bridge, New Jersey. She then became a professor of clinical and family medicine at the Robert Wood Johnson Medical School of New Jersey. She co-founded the family practice residency program at Saint Peter's University Hospital where she is the Chair of Department of Family Practice. She was nominated by representative Frank Pauline Jr., she got her medical degree from University of Rome, College of Medicine. She got her first internship and residency at Queens General Hospital. She firmly believes the basis for credentialing should be "competence, training, clinical experience and quality of care".

== Accomplishments ==
Formica received the Benemerenti Medal, awarded by Pope John Paul II and the New Jersey's Pioneer Women in Medicine Award. She was the first woman president of the Middlesex Medical Society of New Jersey in 1977, the first woman chair of the Department of Family Practice at Saint Peter's University Hospital in 1979. She cofounded the Robert Wood Johnson Medical School at St. Peter's University Hospital in 1980. In 1984 she ran for trustee of American Medical Association (AMA), however she did not get elected. She admits that running in 1984 was a bad decision because she was a young delegate and did not have enough experience to gain enough votes. In 1990, she ran again and became a member of AMA Board of Trustees. Holding this position for nine years, she was a leader in women's issues.

== See also ==
- American Medical Association
