= Yıldırım Uran =

Turkish football manager (1955–2019)

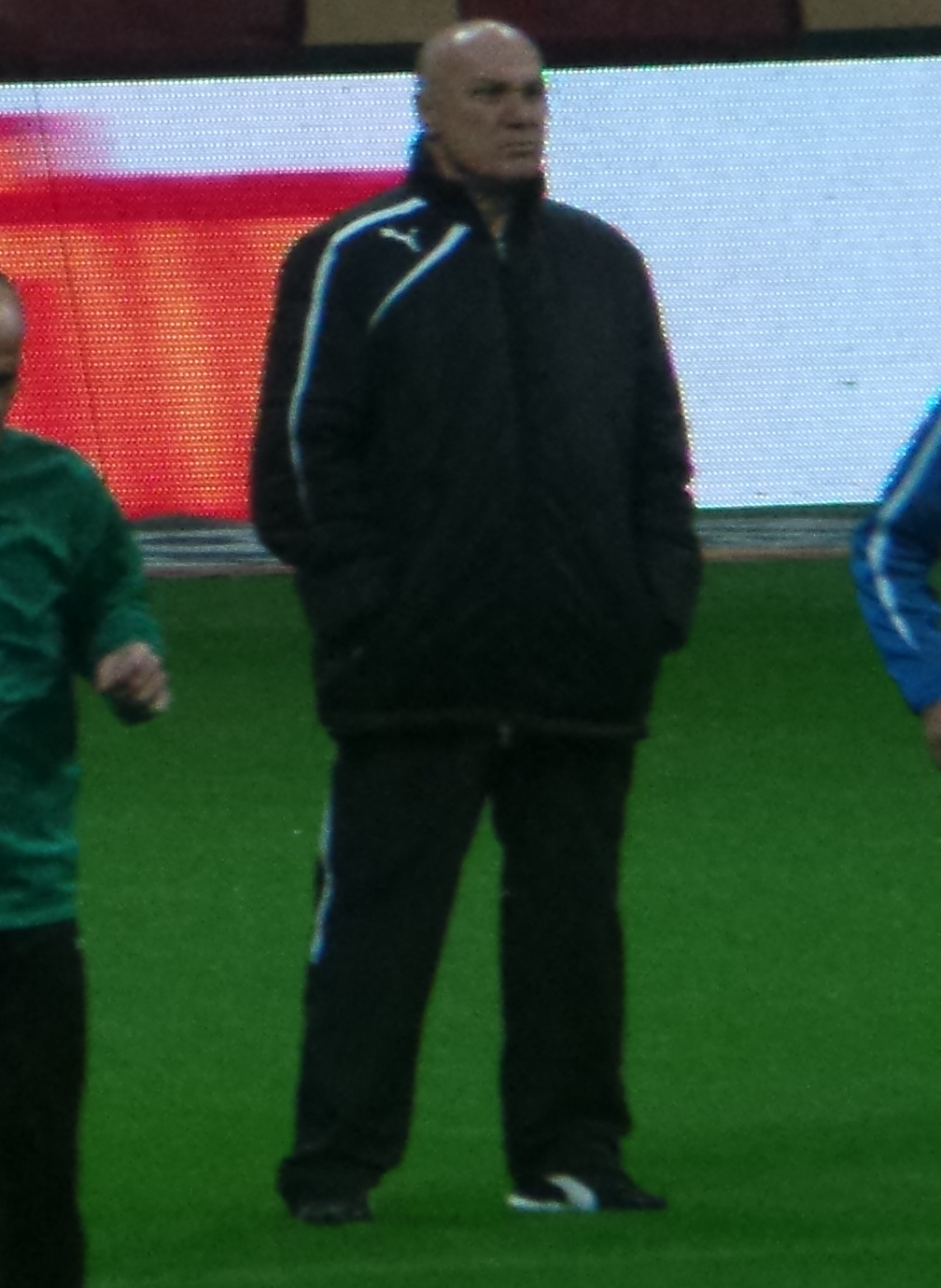
- Yıldırım Uran in 2014.

Personal information
- Date of birth: 6 October 1955
- Place of birth: Ankara, Turkey
- Date of death: 21 January 2019 (aged 63)
- Place of death: Antalya, Turkey

Managerial career
- Years: Team
- 1993–1994: İzmirspor
- 1994–1995: Bucaspor
- 1995–1997: Kuşadasıspor
- 1997–1998: Bucaspor
- 1999–2000: Siirtspor (assistant)
- 2000–2001: Manisaspor
- 2001–2002: Petkimspor
- 2002–2003: İzmirspor
- 2004–2006: Alanyaspor
- 2006: Siirtspor
- 2006: İzmirspor
- 2006–2007: Beylerbeyi
- 2007: Uşakspor
- 2007–2008: Nazilli Belediyespor
- 2008: Fethiyespor
- 2008–2009: Malatyaspor (assistant)
- 2009–2010: Eyüpspor (assistant)
- 2010–2011: Denizlispor (assistant)
- 2011–2014: Akhisar Belediyespor (assistant)
- 2014–2015: Galatasaray (assistant)
- 2015–2017: Bursaspor (assistant)
- 2017: Osmanlıspor (assistant)
- 2018: Antalyaspor (assistant)

Yıldırım Uran (6 October 1955 – 21 January 2019) was a Turkish football manager.

== Early and personal life ==
Uran was born on 6 October 1955 in Ankara.

== Career ==
Uran managed or coached at 22 teams. He obtained promotion to the Süper Lig with Siirtspor at the end of the 1999–2000 season. He was the manager for İzmirspor, Bucaspor, Kuşadasıspor, Siirtspor, Manisaspor, Petkimspor, Alanyaspor, Beylerbeyi, Uşakspor, Nazilli Belediyespor and Fethiyespor, always in the lower divisions of Turkish football.

After working as a manager in his own right, Uran spent much of his later career as an assistant to Hamza Hamzaoğlu at a number of clubs, including at Akhisar Belediyespor, Galatasaray, Bursaspor and Antalyaspor.

== Later life and death ==
Uran died in Antalya on 21 January 2019, a week after suffering a heart attack.
