= Derek Grace =

English footballer (1944–2019)

Personal information
- Date of birth: 29 December 1944
- Place of birth: London, England
- Date of death: 8 January 2019 (aged 74)
- Place of death: Cape Town, South Africa
- Position: Forward

Youth career
- Queen's Park Rangers

Senior career*
Years	Team	Apps	(Gls)
1962–1964	Exeter City	45	(4)
1965–1966	Gillingham	5	(0)
1966–1969	Margate	154	(38)
1969–1970	Dartford	59	(9)
1970	Berea Park F.C.		
1972–1973	Maidstone United		
1973	London City		
1973–1974	Gravesend & Northfleet	14	(2)
1976–1977	Herne Bay	25	(0)
- * Club domestic league appearances and goals

Derek Grace (29 December 1944 – 8 January 2019) was an English footballer who played as a forward most notably in the Football League.

== Career ==
Grace played at youth level with Queens Park Rangers F.C., but failed to break the first team. In 1962, he played in the Football League Fourth Division with Exeter City F.C. After three seasons with Exeter he played in the Football League Third Division with Gillingham F.C.where he made five appearances. In 1965, he played in the Southern Football League with Margate F.C. where he assisted in securing the Southern League Cup in 1967–68. He later played in the Kent League with Dartford F.C.

In 1970, he played abroad in the National Football League with Berea Park F.C. and had a stint in 1972 with Maidstone United F.C. In 1973, he played in Canada with London City in the National Soccer League. In the fall of 1973 he played with Gravesend & Northfleet, and in 1976 played with Herne Bay F.C.

He died on 8 January 2019 in Cape Town, South Africa.
