= William H. Stetson =

American Roman Catholic priest (died 2019)

William H. Stetson was a Roman Catholic priest of the Prelature of Opus Dei ordained in 1962. He was an honorary prelate of the Pope with the title of Reverend Monsignor. He lived in Los Angeles, California.

Stetson was a graduate of Harvard College and Harvard Law School, during which time he became a numerary of the Prelature of Opus Dei. He later earned a doctorate in Canon Law from the Pontifical University of St. Thomas Aquinas (Angelicum) in Rome. He taught for several years on the faculty of Canon Law at the University of Navarre, where he also was involved in establishing the School of Liberal Arts. For seventeen years, Stetson was the vicar of Opus Dei in Chicago, during which time priests of the Prelature of Opus Dei were entrusted with operating a parish of the Archdiocese of Chicago, St. Mary of the Angels, and renovating one of the archdiocese's largest church buildings.

Stetson was appointed director of the Catholic Information Center in Washington, DC, by Cardinal Theodore McCarrick in 2004. He succeeded C. John McCloskey who had been director since 1998. The operation of the center has been entrusted to priests of the Prelature of Opus Dei since 1993. In fall of 2007, Stetson left as head of the Catholic Information Center. It is now under the direction of Charles Trullols.

Since 1983 Stetson also served as consultant and later secretary to the Ecclesiastical Delegate of the Congregation for the Doctrine of the Faith for the Pastoral Provision for former Episcopal priests, by means of which over a hundred men have been ordained for priestly service in the Roman Catholic Church. He maintained the Pastoral Provision Office at Our Lady of Walsingham parish, an Anglican Use congregation in the Archdiocese of Galveston-Houston from 2007 to 2010. He continued to assist at the Holy Cross Chapel in downtown Houston, until being assigned to Los Angeles in 2011 where he assisted at the Cathedral of Our Lady of the Angels and performed pastoral work for Opus Dei.

Stetson died in the morning of January 3, 2019.
