= Julio Vallejo Ruiloba =

Spanish psychiatrist (1945–2019)

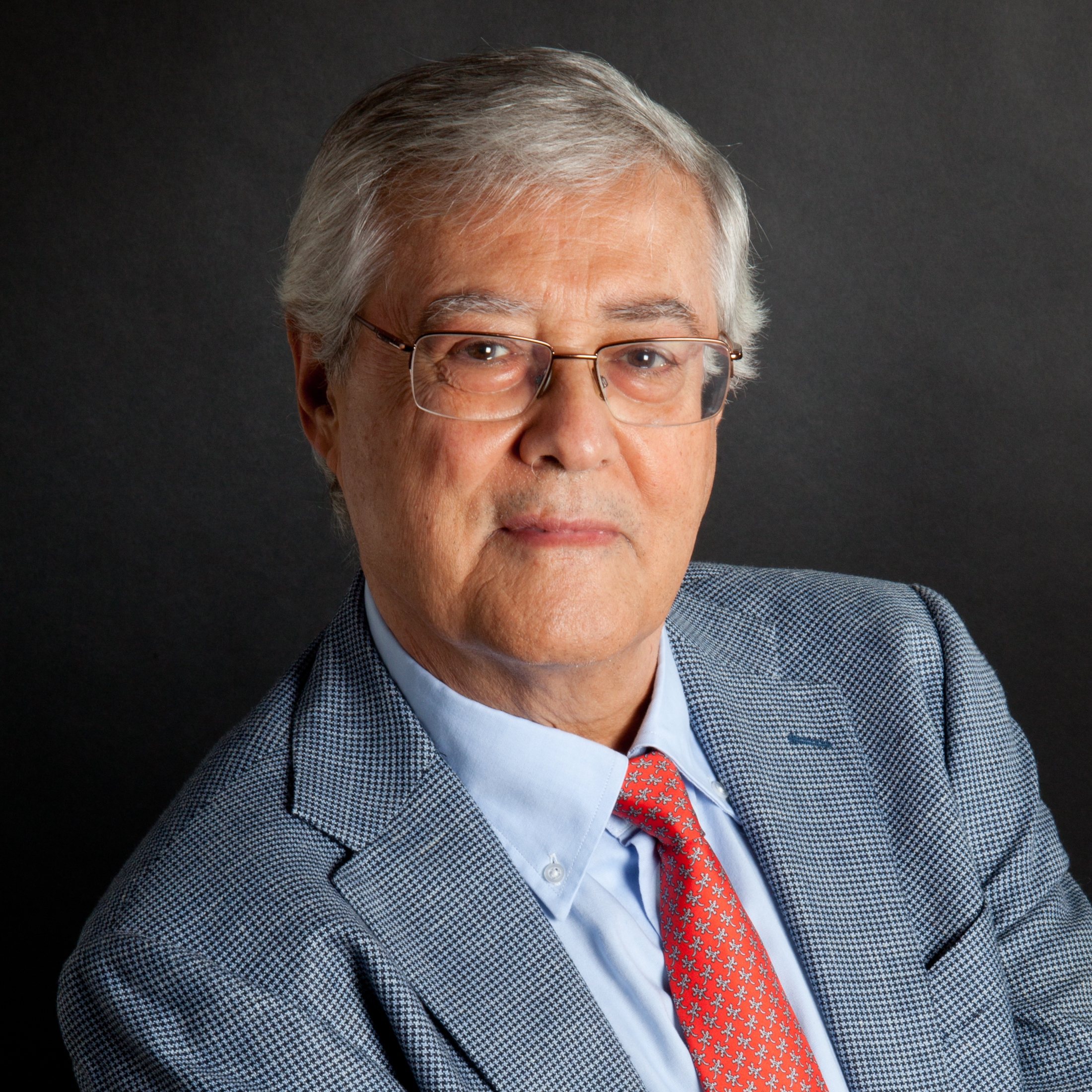

Julio Vallejo Ruiloba (7 May 1945 – 14 January 2019) was a Spanish psychiatrist, medical doctor, Chairman of the Psychiatry Department at the Universitat de Barcelona, ex-President of the Spanish Psychiatry Society, and Academician of the Royal Academy of Medicine of Catalonia. He wrote 56 books about psychiatry and more than 350 scientific papers.

== Biography ==
Vallejo was born in Barcelona, Spain, in 1945. He graduated in medicine from the Universitat de Barcelona in 1969, specialized in psychiatry in 1971 and as a doctor from the same university since 1978. He was named Full Professor of the Psychiatry Department of the Universitat de Barcelona in 1996.

He was the President of the "Fundación Española de Psiquiatría y Salud Mental". He has been the President of the "Sociedad Española de Psiquiatría" (Spanish Psychiatry Society) (2004–2008), the "Sociedad Española de Psiquiatría Biológica" (Spanish Biological Psychiatry Society) (1999–2003) and the "Societat Catalana de Psiquiatria" (Catalan Psychiatry Society) (1981–1982). In 2015 was honored Academician of the Royal Academy of Medicine of Catalonia.

From 1993 to his death, he was the organizer, together with Dr. Sanchez-Planell, of the International Symposium on Current Issues and Controversies in Psychiatry, which takes place annually in Barcelona. In 2012, 2012 and 2014 they organized the International Symposium on Controversies in Psychiatry (Mexico venue) together with Dr. Sanchez-Planell, Dr. Enrique Camarena and Dr. Edgar Belfort (respectively President and ex-President of the Latin American Psychiatric Association – APAL)

Although he practiced general psychiatry his main scientific activity was focused on the depression and obsessive-compulsive disorder. He focused his research in this area. He published 357 scientific articles in national magazines (243) and international (84) on psychiatric issues, has written 56 books as a main author, 109 as a secondary author in chapters, all of them related with the psychiatry theme throughout his career. He was the director of the journal American Journal of Psychiatry (Spanish edition). He was a member of the editorial board of the Spanish Journal of Legal Medicine.

From the non-public point of view he has directed for 25 years a psychiatry center that deals with all psychological and psychiatric problems.

== Contributions to psychiatry ==
Throughout his 40-year career in psychiatry, Prof. Julio Vallejo-Ruiloba led to one of the best research teams considered in the last 20 years in the field of psychiatry in Spain and Latin America. During this period this team made significant contributions to psychiatry. The three main contributions are described below:

First. They have scientifically proven that depressions require different treatments depending on the specific type of depression, against the current trend driven by American psychiatry, and some psychiatrists in Spain. This trend does not distinguish differential treatment in all cases depression in the same manner and with the same drugs. They believe that it must be treated very differently the depressions of biological cause (endogenous) from depressions of psychological or social causes (neurotic or reactive). Thus at the time defended the use of old tricyclics and MAOIs in atypical depression and endogenous, and now they prefer dual-action antidepressants in endogenous depression and antidepressant action of specific the neurotic or reactive depression (serotonin).

Second. They are critical of the excessive overvaluation of comorbidity (at least two different diseases in one patient) in psychiatry, which involves the therapist to make several different diagnostic and patient follow several different treatments. For this reason they identify the primary underlying pathology and treat it specifically. They tend to assess and treat a single disease and not a mixture of pathologies.

Third. They delved into the study and diagnosis of obsessive-compulsive disorder (OCD) in line to differentiate this disease from others like: hair pulling (trichotillomania), fear of body deformation (BDD), etc. These conditions that resemble OCD reiteration, not genuine obsessions and, therefore, treatment should be different. This team has made numerous scientific publications in this field.

== Main books ==
- Introducción a la psicopatología y la psiquiatría (8th edition) (2016)
- Melancolía (2011)
- Proceso a la psiquiatría actual (2011)
- Doctor, estoy deprimido (2010). Non-scientific.
- Tratado de psiquiatría Vol. I y II (2010)
- Temas y retos en la psicopatología actual (2007)
- Psiquiatría para no expertos (2006). Non-scientific.
- Estados obsesivos (2006)
- Patologías resistentes en psiquiatría (2005)
- Psiquiatría en atención primaria (2005)
- Trastornos de Personalidad (2004)
- La neurosis de angustia en el siglo XXI (2004)
- Manual de diagnóstico diferencial y tratamiento en psiquiatría (2001)
- Trastornos neuróticos (2001)
- Comorbilidad de los trastornos afectivos (2001)
- Trastornos afectivos: ansiedad y depresión (1999)
