= Otto Schnepp =

Austrian-American scientist (1925–2019)

Otto Schnepp (1925 - January 2, 2019) was an Austrian-American scientist.

Born in Vienna into a Jewish family, he lived in Shanghai from 1939 to 1948, where he bounced between the Shanghai International Settlement and the French Concession as his father continued to practice medicine. He spoke about his experiences in Shanghai as a featured witness in the documentary Above the Drowning Sea He earned his B.S. in Chemistry at St. John's University in Shanghai (1947), A.B. (1948) and Ph.D. (1951) at University of California, Berkeley. He spoke German, Hebrew, French, Chinese, and English.

Professor Schnepp researched the area of optical molecular spectroscopy. He also studied science and technology of modern China, U.S.-China technology transfer and physical chemistry. He was active in the field of Science Policy, especially as it concerned China. He was a counselor for science and technology at the U.S. Embassy in Beijing from 1980 to 1982, and a former director of the USC East Asian Studies Center, 1994-2000.

He received multiple honors, including the Superior Honor Award of the U.S. Department of State, USC Associates’ Award for Creative Scholarship and Research, and the USC Raubenheimer Outstanding Senior Faculty Award.

Schnepp self-published Roots Lost, Roots Found, a memoir of his life, in April, 2017. The cover was painted by Schnepp's granddaughter, Tali Burry-Schnepp.

Otto Schnepp died on January 2, 2019, in Walnut Creek, California.
