= Willie York =

American homeless person (1944–2019)

- Born: September 21, 1944; Belzoni, Mississippi
- Died: January 23, 2019 (aged 74); Peoria, Illinois

Willie York (September 21, 1944 – January 23, 2019) was a resident of Peoria, Illinois, United States, who rose to regional notoriety for his decision to live as a member of that city's homeless population for parts of five decades, despite offers of help from other people that included shelter and employment.

York served in the army from 1963 to 1965 during the Vietnam War.

After leaving the Army and ending his marriage, York took to Peoria's streets. He would typically commit a minor criminal offense each year once the weather turned cold in order to get himself sentenced to one of the local jails for the winter months, but with such a sentence that he would be released in the spring, although he did spend one 21-month stint in federal prison for throwing an unlit Molotov cocktail at the Peoria Federal Courthouse.

Suffering from complications of diabetes and prostate cancer, York died under hospice care in Peoria on the morning of January 23, 2019.

== Philanthropy ==
In conjunction with the administrator of a Facebook page about him, York made donations to various charitable causes, such as the Children's Hospital of Illinois, with money raised from the sale of clothing and other items related to him.
