= Deng Zongjue =

Chinese biologist and professor (1916–2019)

Deng Zongjue (Chinese: 邓宗觉; 7 April 1916 – 25 January 2019) was a Chinese biologist and a professor at Nanchang University. He was the only tenured professor in Jiangxi province.

== Biography ==
Deng Zongjue was born on 7 April 1916 in Rudong County, Jiangsu, Republic of China. He graduated from the Department of Biology of National Central University in 1938, and taught as an assistant professor and lecturer at the university from 1938 to 1949.

In 1949, Deng was appointed an associate professor in the Department of Zoology of Nanchang University, and later became professor and chair of the department. From 1953 to 1962 he was a professor at Jiangxi Normal University. From 1962 to 1993, he taught at Jiangxi University. In May 1993, he became a professor in the Department of Life Sciences at Nanchang University. He was the only tenured professor in the entire Jiangxi province, and was awarded a special pension by the State Council of the People's Republic of China in 1992.

Deng was a specialist in fish breeding and his research greatly increased production in freshwater fish farms. He was awarded the State Science and Technology Progress Award (First Class) in 1990 and many other national and provincial prizes. He taught until the age of 90.

Deng died on 25 January 2019, at the age of 102.
