= Jane Millgate =

- in Abbotsford House's library
- Born: Eunice Jane Barr; 1937; Leeds, England
- Died: 26 January 2019 (aged 81–82); Canada
- Education: Leeds University; University of Kent
- Occupation: Literary historian
- Known for: authority on the works of Sir Walter Scott
- Spouse: Prof. Michael Millgate

(Eunice) Jane Millgate born Eunice Jane Barr (1937 – 26 January 2019) was a British born Emeritus Professor of English at the University of Toronto. She was an authority on the works of Sir Walter Scott.

== Life ==
Millgate was born in Leeds in 1937. She gained her education at Leeds University and at the University of Kent. She married in 1960 and four years later she and Michael Millgate emigrated to Canada.

Millgate started her thirty year career at the University of Toronto in 1964 where she was teaching English at Victoria College. In the 1980s she was the vice Dean of the Faculty of Arts & Science, but she was known for her teaching and especially of 19th century literature. Her 1984 book Walter Scott: The Making of the Novelist established her and the book as an authority on Scott. The book reevaluated Scott's contribution to literature and his then new approach to historical writing.

In 2002 she was elected President of the Edinburgh Walter Scott Club.

She died in Toronto in 2019 leaving her husband Emeritus Professor Michael Millgate. She had met her husband in 1960 whilst he was teaching English literature at Leeds University.

== Awards and fellowships ==
- Fellow of Massey College
- Fellow of the Royal Society of Edinburgh (1994)
- Fellow of the Royal Society of Canada.

== Works include ==
- Macaulay (1973)
- Walter Scott: The Making of the Novelist (1984)
- Scott's Last Edition: A Study in Publishing History (1987)
