= Norman Goodman =

American lawyer

County Clerk of New York County
- In office May 3, 1969 – December 31, 2014
- Appointed by: Appellate Division of the New York Supreme Court
- Succeeded by: Milton Tingling

Personal details
- Born: December 30, 1923 New Haven, Connecticut, U.S.
- Died: January 24, 2019 (aged 95) New York City, U.S.
- Party: Democratic
- Spouse: Ruth Weissman (m. 1948; died 2017)
- Children: 2
- Education: New York University
- Occupation: Government official; lawyer

Norman Goodman (December 30, 1923 – January 24, 2019) was an American municipal official. He served as the county clerk of New York County, coextensive with the borough of Manhattan, New York City, from 1969 to 2014.

== Career ==
Goodman was a lawyer for seventeen years. In 1965, he was appointed the county's deputy clerk. In 1969, he was appointed county clerk by the Appellate Division of the New York Supreme Court. As of March 2009, Goodman had held the position during seven different New York governors and, although not a city government official, during six different New York City mayors. As commissioner of jurors, Goodman sent out more than 11 million jury summonses; with his signature and title appearing at the top of each summons, Goodman once quipped that he had "the most notorious signature in New York". He retired in December 2014, and was succeeded by Milton Tingling.

== Accolades ==
In December 2008, the jury assembly room at the New York County Courthouse, located at 60 Centre Street in Manhattan, was named after him. A bronze plaque bearing his image was installed and inscribed with "his commitment to his work has been matched only by the kindness and consideration he has brought to his dealings with everyone he has encountered."

== Personal life and death ==
Goodman was born in New Haven, Connecticut and was educated at New York University. He married Ruth Weissman in 1948. They had two children and were married until her death in 2017.

Goodman lived on the Upper East Side of Manhattan. He died at his home from complications of Parkinson's disease on January 24, 2019, at the age of 95.

== See also ==
- List of people from New York City
