= Jack Garrick (footballer) =

Australian rules footballer (1926–2019)

Personal information
- Full name: John William Garrick
- Born: 22 July 1926
- Died: 6 January 2019 (aged 92)
- Original team: Yarraville
- Height: 185 cm (6 ft 1 in)
- Weight: 85 kg (187 lb)
- Position: Ruck

Playing career^{1}
Years	Club	Games (Goals)
1948–55	South Melbourne	117 (23)
- ^{1} Playing statistics correct to the end of 1955.

John William Garrick (22 July 1926 – 6 January 2019) was an Australian rules footballer who played with South Melbourne in the Victorian Football League (VFL).
