= Kenneth Kauth =

American politician (1924–2019)

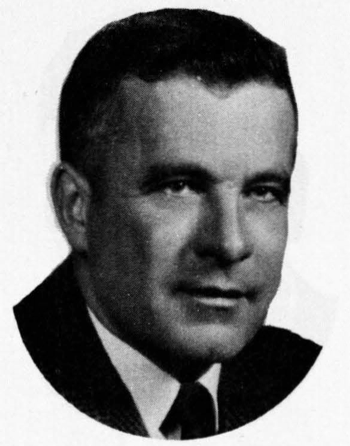

Member of the South Dakota House of Representatives from the 8th district
- In office 1969–1978

Personal details
- Born: August 18, 1924 South Dakota, United States
- Died: January 2, 2019 (aged 94) Huron, South Dakota
- Party: Democratic
- Profession: businessman

Kenneth C. Kauth (August 18, 1924 – January 2, 2019) was an American politician in the state of South Dakota. He was a member of the South Dakota House of Representatives from 1969 to 1978. Kauth was a businessman, owning a tire business.
