= Susanne Humphrey =

American medical librarian (c.1944–2019)

Susanne Marguerite Humphrey (c. 1944–January 8, 2019) was an American medical librarian who worked at the National Library of Medicine.

== Career ==
Humphrey worked at the National Library of Medicine for 43 years before retiring in 2009. Humphrey wrote the textbook, Databases a Primer for Retrieving Information by Computer in the mid-1980s. At the National Library of Medicine, Humphrey led a project to automatically index journal articles according to Medical Subject Headings, and her research led to the development of public, web-based tools for automated indexing.

== Personal life ==
Humphrey's husband was Andrew Clifton Humphrey Sr. She died in January 2019 aged 74.

== Awards and honors ==
Humphrey earned the 1988 Best JASIS Paper award with co-author Nancy E. Miller for their paper "Knowledge-Based Indexing of the Medical Literature: The Indexing Aid Project". In 1994, Humphrey was elected a AAAS Fellow.
