= Erich Lindenlaub =

German cross-country skier (1930–2019)

Personal information
- Nationality: German
- Born: 21 December 1930 Vesser, Germany
- Died: 16 January 2019 (aged 88) Rodewisch, Germany

Sport
- Sport: Cross-country skiing

Achievements and titles
- Olympic finals: 1956 Winter Olympics

Erich Lindenlaub (21 December 1930 – 16 January 2019) was a German cross-country skier. He competed in the men's 30 kilometre event at the 1956 Winter Olympics.
