= Earnest F. Gloyna =

American environmental engineer (1921–2019)

Earnest Frederick Gloyna (June 30, 1921 – January 9, 2019) was an American environmental engineer.

Gloyna was born in Vernon, Texas. He served in the United States Army Corps of Engineers during World War II. After his military service Gloyna studied civil engineering at Texas Technological College, completing his bachelor's degree in 1946. He further his study in the subject with a master's degree from the University of Texas at Austin, and joined the faculty upon graduation in 1949. In 1953, Gloyna received a doctorate in environmental and water resources engineering from Johns Hopkins University. At UT, Gloyna held the Joe L. King Professorship, and later the Bettie Margaret Smith Chair Emeritus in Environmental Health Engineering. Gloyna was named dean of the College of Engineering in 1970, the same year he won election to the United States National Academy of Engineering for "leadership in engineering education, water resources management, and environmental engineering." He served as dean until 1987, and remained on the faculty through 2001. Gloyna died on January 9, 2019, aged 97.
