= Georges Dimou =

Greek actor and singer (1931–2019)

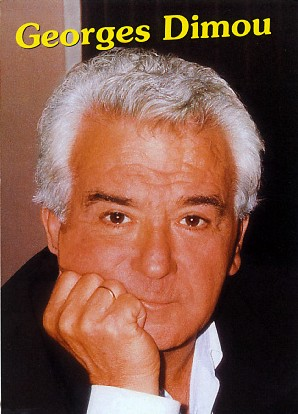
Georges Dimou

Georges Dimou (Greek: Γιώργος Δήμου; 14 July 1931 – 8 January 2019 in Vienna) was a Greek singer born in Thessaloniki. He studied dramatic and vocal art in Athens and from the beginning he was successful as actor and singer with international repertoire.

== Golden Medal for Merits of the Federal Land Vienna ==
Georges Dimou was awarded with the "Golden Medal for Merits of the Federal Land Vienna" on 15 January 2003, an order for his intensive efforts for international understanding.

== Career ==
He started as a singer in the Viennese Splendid Bar (Managed by Mr. Parker), Austria in 1958. Some years later, Georges became the owner of the Splendid Bar, arranging the successful musical programme by himself. His regular guests were international stars like Ava Gardner, Elizabeth Taylor, Richard Burton, Sophia Loren, Catherine Deneuve, Kirk Douglas, James Mason, Omar Sharif, Mel Ferrer, politicians, artists, aristocrats.

As an actor and musician he played in amusing films like The crazy aunts, The world is azure, Red lips have to be kissed. Since 1970, he has a Greek restaurant Schwarze Katze – Black Cat near the Theater an der Wien at the Naschmarkt with original Greek cuisine, a wide range of Greek wines and many regular guests who enjoy Greek music.

== Ambassador of Music ==
Georges Dimou became an "Ambassador of Music". Each year he engages top musicians, singers and dancers of Greece for a "Sirtaki – Tour" through Austria. Austrian people are really deeply in love with Greek music and so there were a lot of television-recordings such as e.g. "Sirtaki on the Danube", "The Greeks in Graz" and live-recordings of his concerts. But he is not only engaging Greek musicians for Austria, he, too, has arranged a "Viennese Evening" in Thessaloniki. He organised a manifold programme which showed the plenty of music of Vienna with opera, operetta, Viennese melodies, popular music of violins, guitars and concertina and the famous musicals of "Vienna's theatre". Greek Television, which recorded the concert, has shown the "Viennese Evening" seven times.

== The New CD ==
The new CD of Georges "Sing´ ein Lied für die Welt" – "Sing a song for the world" was published in May 2005 by EMI Music Austria. Music was composed by the Greek composers

- Jorgos Hatzinassios ("Sing ein Lied für die Welt", "Simera")
- Jorgos Katsaros ("Opa, Opa", "Maria me ta kitrina")
- Alexis Papadimitriou ("S´agapo jati s´agapao", "Ime trelos pu s´agapisa") and
- Nikos Ignatiadis ("Kokkino Garifallo", "Pote, Pote", "An anixis tin kardia mou")

German words were written by the celebrated text writer Hanneliese KREISSL – WURTH. Georges sings in German and Greek language about love, emotion, children, summer and sea and of course about Greece.

[source: article "Georges Dimou" from Dr. Ingrid Dimou]
