= Béatrice Ahyi Aguessy =

Beninese gynaecologist and academic (1934–2019)

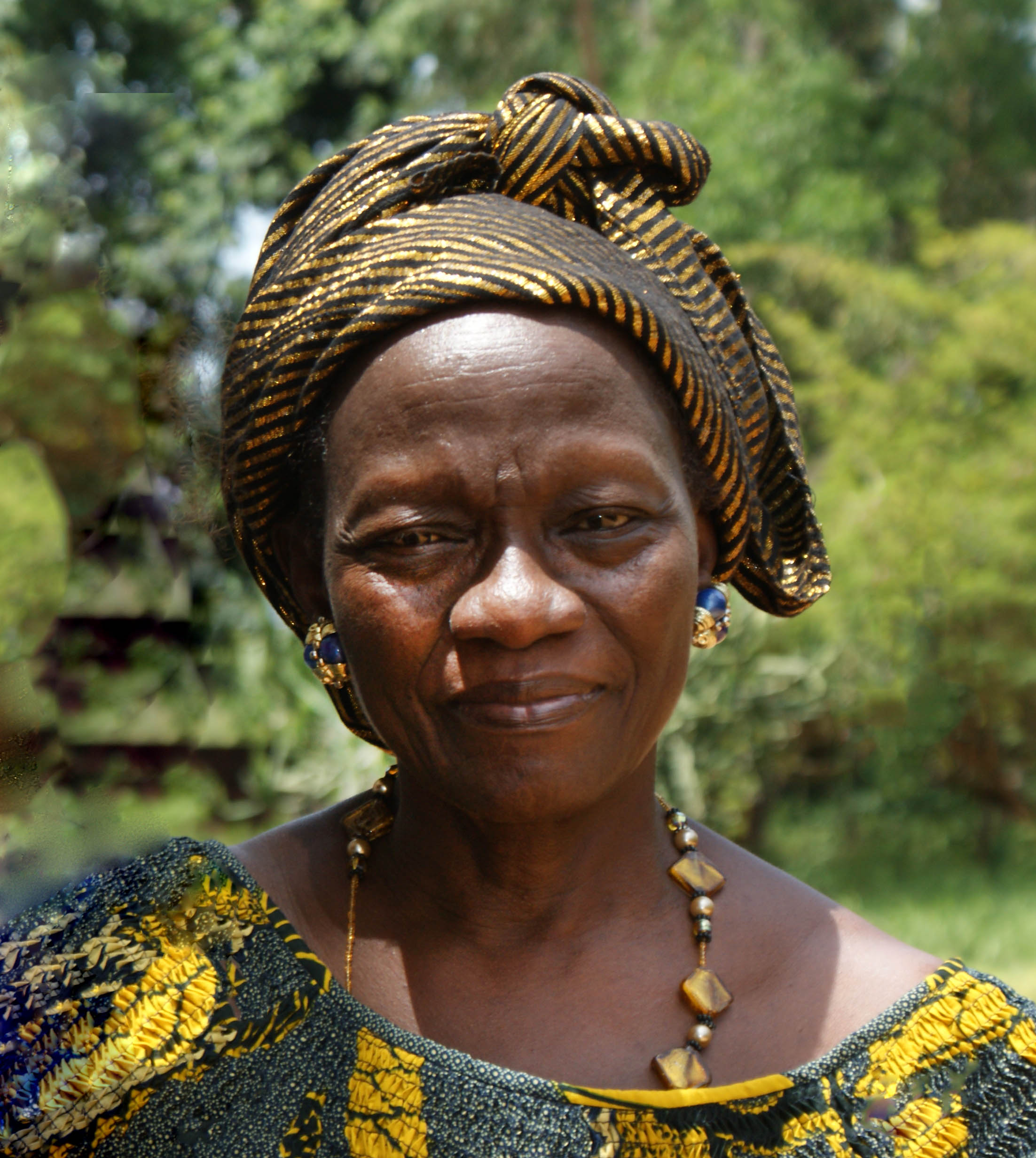
- Ahyi Aguessy in 2011
- Born: 1934; Abomey, French Dahomey
- Died: 11 January 2019 (aged 84–85); Cotonou, Benin
- Education: Cheikh Anta Diop University
- Occupations: gynaecologist and professor
- Spouse: Honorat Aguessy

Béatrice Ahyi Aguessy (1934 – 11 January 2019) was a Beninese gynaecologist and academic, first female professor of gynaecology and obstetrics in the region.

== Career ==
Béatrice Ahyi was born in 1934 in Abomey, French Dahomey. She was the first black student at the Cheikh Anta Diop University's medical school, where she graduated with a degree in experimental sciences in 1958. She then moved to Paris to continue her studies and defended her medical thesis in 1968 for the University of Paris. Four years later, she obtained a diploma in gynaecology and obstetrics, and in 1975 she specialised in infertility.

She also devoted herself to family planning, occupational medicine, and prison medicine. She was professor of gynaecology and obstetrics at the University of Benin, becoming the first female in the region to do so.

== Personal life and death ==
She was married to prestigious Beninese sociologist and academic Honorat Aguessy.

Ahyi Aguessy passed away on 11 January 2019 in the National University Hospital Centre of Cotonou, Benin at the age of 85.
