= Gérard Poulain =

French field hockey player (1936–2019)

Personal information
- Nationality: French
- Born: 1 August 1936 Amiens, France
- Died: 24 January 2019 (aged 82)

Sport
- Sport: Field hockey

Gérard Poulain (1 August 1936 – 24 January 2019) was a French field hockey player. He competed in the men's tournament at the 1960 Summer Olympics.
