= J. H. Frappier =

American politician (1931–2019)

Member of the Missouri Senate from the 2nd district
- In office elected 1974 – 1981

Personal details
- Born: August 8, 1931 Milwaukee, Wisconsin, US
- Died: January 23, 2019 (aged 87) New Port Richey, Florida, US
- Party: Republican
- Spouse(s): Joyce Pridgen; Nancy Jo McIntyre
- Children: 3
- Education: Indiana University
- Occupation: systems analyst

Jo Henri Frappier (August 8, 1931 - January 23, 2019) was an American politician who served in the Missouri Senate and the Missouri House of Representatives. He served in the U.S. Marine Corps during the Korean War from 1951 to 1953 and became a sergent. Frappier was previously elected to the Missouri House of Representatives in 1966, serving until 1974 and four years as chairman of the House Minority Caucus. His wife M. Joyce Frappier died in 1986. Mr. Frappier had been working as the Missouri director of governmental operations and legislation at the time of her death. In 1989, he married Nancy Jo McIntyre in Jefferson City, Missouri. McIntyre had been a reporter for United Press International.

He received a Bachelor's Degree and a Master of Business Administration from Indiana University.
