= Rosa González Román =

Chilean journalist and politician (1942–2019)

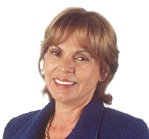

Member of the Chamber of Deputies
- In office 11 March 1998 – 11 March 2006
- Constituency: 1st District

Personal details
- Born: 23 July 1942 Santiago, Chile
- Died: 21 January 2019 (aged 76) Santiago, Chile
- Occupation: Journalist

Rosa González Román (23 July 1942 – 21 January 2019) was a Chilean journalist and politician who served as a Deputy from 11 March 1998 to 11 March 2006.

== Biography ==
She was born in Buin, Santiago, on 23 July 1942. She is the daughter of Darío César González Pino and Melania Orfilia Román Cabezas. In 1977 she married, in her second marriage, Jorge Matus. She is the mother of five children.

=== Professional career ===
She completed her primary and secondary education at Escuela Italia and pursued higher studies in Journalism at the Universidad Contemporánea de Arica. She contributed as a Sunday columnist to the newspaper La Estrella of Arica for seven years.

She later developed activities as a mining entrepreneur. Between 1989 and 1995 she served as national councillor of the National Mining Society (SONAMI) and as president of GEICOS, its Arica branch.

Between 1990 and 1991 she organized cross-border business meetings between Arica and Tacna and promoted the La Concordia Project. She also developed the Cochasa Plan (Corporación de Desarrollo de Chacalluta S.A.) aimed at revitalizing Arica, which was later adopted by the government under the name CORDENOR (Corporación de Desarrollo del Norte). During 1991 and 1992 she actively participated in the "Proyecto Arica", another initiative for the city's development.

In 1991 she was appointed Official Delegate of Chile from the private sector to the Interparliamentary and Business Commission for the Southern Cone, serving until 1996. Around the same period, she was designated National Director of the Corporation for the Regionalization of Chile (CORCHILE), participating in congresses throughout the country as speaker and rapporteur.

== Political career ==
Between 1994 and 1996 she was director of the Arica Equestrian Group. In 1996, following the Arica earthquake, she organized relief efforts, drawing on previous experience from earthquake assistance campaigns in Santiago.

In the December 1997 parliamentary elections, she ran as an independent candidate for District No. 1 (Arica, General Lagos, Putre, and Camarones) in the Tarapacá Region and was elected to the Chamber of Deputies of Chile for the 1998–2002 term.

In 2001 she was re-elected for the same district, this time representing the Independent Democratic Union (UDI), serving from 2002 to 2006. In the 2005 elections she sought re-election but was not returned to Congress. After that period, she withdrew from political and public life.
