= Marc Viénot =

French banking executive (1928–2019)

- Born: 1 November 1928; Paris, France
- Died: 29 January 2019 (aged 90)
- Occupation: Banking executive

Marc Viénot (1 November 1928 – 28 January 2019) was a French banking executive.

== Biography ==
Viénot attended the Paris Institute of Political Studies and École Nationale d'Administration, and subsequently joined the Inspectorate General of Finances. He was named second in command of the inspectorate in 1974. In 1986. he was named CEO. In 1988, he was charged with fraud relating to a large deposit relating to Marceau Investissements Group and Georges Pébereau. However, he was granted amnesty for these charges. In 2003, he testified in the trial of the Vivendi media conglomerate to defend his friend, Jean-Marie Messier.

Viénot died on 28 January 2019 at the age of 90.
