= 2019 in literature =

This article contains information about the literary events and publications of 2019.

== Events ==
- February 2 – The family of the U.S. fiction writer J. D. Salinger confirm in an interview published in the U.K. newspaper The Guardian that he left a large unpublished body of work on his death in 2010, which they are preparing for publication.
- April 11–13 – Trinity College Dublin holds a three-day symposium on Finnegans Wake, marking the 80th anniversary its publication.
- May 10 – Simon Armitage is appointed Poet Laureate of the United Kingdom in succession to Carol Ann Duffy.
- July 15 – Iris Murdoch's birthday centenary is marked in Ireland with a postage stamp based on a portrait of her. Dublin City Council unveils a plaque at Blessington Street Park, located temporarily due to renovations at her nearby birthplace, 59 Blessington Street. In the U.K., The Times Literary Supplement has her on its cover.
- September 20 – Museum of Literature Ireland (MoLI) is opened in Dublin.
- December 7 – The seventh film version of Little Women, in a metafictional adaptation of Louisa May Alcott's novel by the director, Greta Gerwig, is premiered in the United States.

== New books ==
Dates after each title indicate U.S. publication, unless otherwise indicated.

=== Fiction ===
- André Alexis – Days by Moonlight
- Margaret Atwood – The Testaments (September 10)
- Leigh Bardugo – Ninth House (October 8)
- Kevin Barry – Night Boat to Tangier (June 29, UK)
- Simon Beckett – The Scent of Death (February 12, Germany; April 18, UK)
- Xurxo Borrazás – Covalladas. Prosa vertical
- Rowan Hisayo Buchanan – Starling Days (July 11, UK)
- Candice Carty-Williams – Queenie (April 11, UK)
- Ted Chiang – Exhalation: Stories (May 7)
- Ta-Nehisi Coates – The Water Dancer (September 24)
- Lindsey Davis – A Capitol Death (April 4, UK)
- Lucy Ellmann – Ducks, Newburyport (July 4)
- Bernardine Evaristo – Girl, Woman, Other (May, UK)
- Lawrence Ferlinghetti – Little Boy (March)
- Alice Hoffman – The World That We Knew (September 24)
- Michel Houellebecq – Serotonin (January 4, France)
- Luke Jennings – Killing Eve: No Tomorrow (March 26, UK)
- László Krasznahorkai – Chasing Homer (October 8, Hungary)
- John Lanchester – The Wall (January 17, UK)
- John le Carré – Agent Running in the Field (October 15, UK)
- Deborah Levy – The Man Who Saw Everything (August 29, UK)
- Valeria Luiselli – Lost Children Archive (March 7)
- Ian McDonald – Luna: Moon Rising (March 19)
- Ian McEwan – Machines Like Me (April)
- Maaza Mengiste – The Shadow King (September 24)
- Chigozie Obioma – An Orchestra of Minorities (January)
- Joseph O'Connor – Shadowplay (June 6, UK)
- Téa Obreht – Inland (August 13)
- Ann Patchett – The Dutch House (September 24)
- Max Porter – Lanny (March 5)
- Salman Rushdie – Quichotte (August 29, UK)
- Elizabeth Strout – Olive, Again (October 15)
- Zlatko Topčić – June 28, 1914 (July 5)
- Christos Tsiolkas – Damascus (Australia)
- Mario Vargas Llosa – Harsh Times
- Ocean Vuong – On Earth We're Briefly Gorgeous (June 4)
- Colson Whitehead – The Nickel Boys (July 16)
- Ian Williams – Reproduction (January 22, Canada)
- Jeanette Winterson – Frankissstein: A Love Story (May 28, UK)

=== Children and young people ===
- Kathi Appelt – Max Attacks
- Malorie Blackman – Crossfire (August 8, UK)
- Nathan Bryon (illustrated by Dapo Adeola) – Look Up (June, UK)
- Jerry Craft – New Kid
- Jenny Downham – Furious Thing (October 3, UK)
- Mem Fox – The Tiny Star.
- Connie Glynn – The Lost Princess (September 5, UK)
- Judith Kerr (died May) – The Curse of the School Rabbit (July, UK)
- Charlie Mackesy – The Boy, The Mole, The Fox and the Horse
- Jason Reynolds – Look Both Ways (October 8)
- Amélie Wen Zhao – Blood Heir (November 19)

=== Poetry ===
- Natalie Harkin – Archival-Poetics (UK)
- Yanyi – The Year of Blue Water (March 26)

=== Drama ===
- Alice Birch – (BLANK)
- S. Shakthidharan with Eamon Flack – Counting and Cracking
- Ian Shaw & Joseph Nixon – The Shark Is Broken

=== Non-fiction ===
- Michael Miller - Fake News: Separating Truth from Fiction (January 1, 2019)
- Cristina Fernández de Kirchner – Sinceramente (April 25, Argentina)
- Shaquem Griffin, Shaquill Griffin, Mark Schlabach – Inseparable (July 9)
- Ibram X. Kendi – How to Be an Antiracist (August 13)
- Lenore Newman – Lost Feast (October 8, 2019, Canada)
- Emma Smith – This is Shakespeare (May 2, UK)
- Joshua Specht – Red Meat Republic (May 7, Australia)
- Jo Thornely – Zealot: A Book About Cults (February 26, Australia)

=== Biography and memoirs ===
- Laura Cumming – On Chapel Sands: my mother and other missing persons (July 4, UK)
- Jack Fairweather – The Volunteer: One Man's Mission to Lead an Underground Army Inside Auschwitz and Stop the Holocaust (June 27, UK)
- Cristina Fernández de Kirchner – Sinceramente
- Adam Nicolson – The Making of Poetry: Coleridge, the Wordsworths and their Year of Marvels (May 30, UK)
- D. J. Taylor – Lost Girls: Love, War and Literature, 1939–1951 (September 5, UK)

== Deaths ==
Birth years link to the corresponding "[year] in literature" article:

- January 1
  - Ludwig W. Adamec, Austrian-born American historian noted for his work on Afghanistan and the Middle East, 94 (born 1924)
  - Katie Flynn, British writer of popular historical and romantic fiction, 82 (born 1936)
  - Perry Deane Young, American playwright and historian, 77 (born 1941)
- January 2
  - Samuel Rayan, Indian theologian, 98 (born 1920)
  - Jerzy Turonek, Polish-Belarusian historian, 89 (born 1929)
  - Tommy Watz, Norwegian translator from Italian and recipient of the 2013 Bastian Prize for his translation of Alberto Moravia's Gli indifferenti, 60 (born 1958)
- January 3
  - Dibyendu Palit, Indian writer of Bengali poems, novels and short stories, 79 (born 1939)
  - Pinaki Thakur, Indian poet who wrote in Bengali, 59 (born 1959)
- January 4 – John Burningham, English writer of children's literature (Mr Gumpy's Outing, Borka: The Adventures of a Goose with No Feathers), 82 (born 1936)
- January 5
  - Emil Brumaru, Romanian writer and poet, 80 (born 1938)
  - Aisha Lemu, British-born Nigerian Islamic scholar, 79 (born 1940)
- January 6 – Bea Vianen, Surinamese writer (mainly in Dutch but also in Sranan Tongo) and admirer of V. S. Naipaul, 83 (born 1935)
- January 7
  - Helmut Berding, German historian, 88 (born 1930)
  - Aline Kiner, French novelist, 59 (born 1959)
  - Theodore K. Rabb, American historian noted for his work on the early modern period of European history, 81 (born 1937)
  - A. G. Rigg, British medievalist, 81 (born 1937)
- January 8 – Pierre Barillet, French playwright, 95 (born 1923)
- January 9
  - Conxita Julià, Spanish Catalan poet, 98 (born 1920)
  - Thierry Séchan, French novelist, 69 (born 1949)
- January 12
  - A. Brian Deer, Canadian Kahnawake Mohawk librarian noted for developing the Brian Deer Classification System, 74 (born 1945)
  - Javier de Hoz, Spanish philologist and academic noted for his work on Paleohispanic languages, historical linguistics, ancient Celtic languages, history of writing, preclassical Greek literature, Greek epigraphy and ancient Greek theatre, 78 (born 1940)
  - Linda Kelly, English Romantic historian noted for portraying Thomas Chatterton, Richard Brinsley Sheridan and Thomas Moore, 82 (born 1936)
- January 13
  - Miguel Civil, Spanish sumerologist, 92 (born 1926)
  - Francine du Plessix Gray, Polish-born American writer and literary critic, 88 (born 1930)
- January 15 – Bai Hua, Chinese novelist, playwright and poet, 88 (born 1930)
- January 16 – Mirjam Pressler, German novelist and translator from Hebrew, English, Dutch and Afrikaans, 78 (born 1940)
- January 17
  - Michael Hardcastle MBE, British writer of children's literature, 85 (born 1933)
  - Mary Oliver, American poet and 1984 Pulitzer Prize for Poetry recipient, 83 (born 1935)
  - Sam Savage, American novelist (Firmin: Adventures of a Metropolitan Lowlife), 78 (born 1940)
- January 18 – Brian Stowell, the first recorded full-length Manx novelist, translator of Alice's Adventures in Wonderland into Manx and 2008 Reih Bleeaney Vanannan recipient, 82 (born 1936)
- January 19
  - Atin Bandyopadhyay, Bangladeshi writer of Bengali literature, 85 (born 1934)
  - Thomas Habinek, American classical scholar noted for his work on Latin literature and Roman cultural history, 65 (born 1953)
  - Henry Horwitz, American historian noted for his work on late seventeenth-century English politics, 80 (born 1938)
  - Barthélémy Kotchy, Ivorian writer, 84 (born 1934)
- January 20
  - Ian Dewhirst MBE, British historian, 82 (born 1936)
  - Ronald Hayman, British biographer of Pinter, Beckett, Stoppard, Nietzsche, Kafka, Grass, Proust and Thomas Mann, 86 (born 1932)
  - Norman Itzkowitz, American translator, historian of the Ottoman Empire and purveyor of psychoanalysis, 87 (born 1931)
- January 21
  - Padraic Fiacc, Irish poet and member of Aosdána, 94 (born 1924)
  - Roman Kudlyk, Ukrainian poet and literary critic, 77 (born 1941)
- January 22
  - Leonard Dinnerstein, American historian, 84 (born 1934)
  - Éric Holder, French novelist, 58 (born 1960)
  - Jean-Maurice Rouquette, French historian noted for his work on ancient and Romanesque Provence, 87 (born 1930)
- January 23 – Diana Athill OBE, British literary editor and novelist, 101 (born 1917)
- February 1 – Andrew McGahan, Australian novelist, 52 (born 1966)
- February 9 – Farhad Ebrahimi, Iranian poet and writer, 83 (born 1935)
- February 14 – Andrea Levy, English novelist, 62 (born 1956)
- February 25 – Nikhil Sen, Bangladeshi dramatist, 87
- March 1 – Peter van Gestel, Dutch writer, 81 (born 1937)
- March 4 – Les Carlyon, Australian writer and newspaper editor, 76 (born 1942)
- March 9 – Bernard Binlin Dadié, Ivorien author and politician, (103) (born 1916)
- March 10 – Pius Adesanmi, Nigerian-born Canadian professor, writer, literary critic, satirist, and columnist, 47 (killed in the crash of Ethiopian Airlines Flight 302
- March 13 – Edmund Capon, English-born Australian art historian, 78 (born 1940)
- March 15 – Rudi Krausmann, Austrian-born Australian playwright and poet, 85 (born 1933)
- April 1 – Vonda N. McIntyre, American science fiction writer, 70 (born 1948)
- April 29 – Les Murray, Australian poet, anthologist and critic, 80 (born 1938)
- May 14 – Daniel Vidart, Uruguayan anthropologist, writer, historian, and essayist, 98 (born 1920)
- May 19 – John Millett, Australian poet, reviewer and poetry editor, 98 (born 1921)
- May 22 – Judith Kerr, English writer and illustrator (born 1923)
- June 1 – Christobel Mattingley, Australian author of books for children and adults, 87 (born 1931)
- June 8 – Milan Asadurov, Bulgarian science fiction writer (born 1949)
- July 7 – Steve Cannon, American novelist ("Groove, Bang, and Jive Around"), playwright, and arts impresario (A Gathering of the Tribes), 84 (born 1935)
- July 13 – Kerry Reed-Gilbert, Australian poet, author and champion of Indigenous writers, 62 (born 1956)
- July 17 – Andrea Camilleri, Italian novelist (Inspector Montalbano novels) and playwright, 93 (born 1925)
- July 18 – Luciano De Crescenzo, Italian writer and director, 90 (born 1928)
- July 21 – Ann Moyal, Australian historian, (born 1926)
- July 22 – Brigitte Kronauer, German novelist, 78
- August 5 – Toni Morrison, American novelist (Beloved, Song of Solomon, Tar Baby), winner of the 1993 Nobel Prize in Literature and 1988 Pulitzer Prize for Fiction, 88 (born 1931)
- September 1 – Barbara Probst Solomon, American author (born 1928)
- September 11 – Anne Rivers Siddons, American novelist, (The House Next Door) and (Peachtree Road), 83 (born 1936)
- September 13 – György Konrád, Hungarian novelist and political dissident, President of PEN International (1990–1993), 86 (born 1933)
- September 16 – Steve Dalachinsky, American poet, 72, (born 1946)
- September 23
  - Al Alvarez, English writer and poetry editor, 90 (born 1929)
  - Elaine Feinstein, English poet, 88 (born 1930)
- October 6 – Ciaran Carson, Irish poet, 70 (born 1948)
- October 12 – Alison Prince, English children's writer and biographer, 88
- October 14 – Harold Bloom, American literary critic and writer (The Anxiety of Influence, The Western Canon: The Books and School of the Ages), 89 (born 1930)
- October 30 – Beatrice Faust, Australian author and women's activist, 80 (born 1939)
- November 5 – Ernest J. Gaines, American author (A Lesson Before Dying, The Autobiography of Miss Jane Pittman, A Gathering of Old Men), 86 (born 1933)
- November 7 – Nabanita Dev Sen, Indian writer and academic, 79 (born 1938)
- November 14 – Krystyna Boglar, Polish writer known mostly for her work for children and young adults (born 1931)
- November 24 – Clive James, Australian critic, journalist, broadcaster and writer, 80 (born 1939)
- December 29 – Alasdair Gray, Scottish author (Lanark) and visual artist, 85 (born 1934)
- December 30 – Sonny Mehta, Indian-born British and American publishing executive (Knopf Doubleday Publishing Group), 76, (born 1942)

== Awards ==
The following list is arranged alphabetically:

- Akutagawa Prize: Natsuko Imamura; Makoto Furukawa
- Anisfield-Wolf Book Award: Tommy Orange for There There
- Baillie Gifford Prize: Hallie Rubenhold, The Five: The Untold Lives of the Women Killed by Jack the Ripper
- Booker Prize: Margaret Atwood for The Testaments and Bernardine Evaristo for Girl, Woman, Other
- Bookseller/Diagram Prize for Oddest Title of the Year: The Dirt Hole and its Variations by Charles L Dobbins.
- Caine Prize for African Writing: Lesley Nneka Arimah, "Skinned"
- Camões Prize: Chico Buarque
- Carnegie Medal: Elizabeth Acevedo for The Poet X
- Costa Book Awards: Jack Fairweather, The Volunteer
- Danuta Gleed Literary Award: Carrianne Leung, That Time I Loved You
- David Cohen Prize: Edna O'Brien
- Desmond Elliott Prize: Claire Adam for Golden Child
- European Book Prize: Jonathan Coe, Middle England and, Laurent Gaudé, Nous l’Europe, banquet des peuples
- Folio Prize: Raymond Antrobus, The Perseverance
- Friedenspreis des Deutschen Buchhandels: Sebastião Salgado
- German Book Prize: Saša Stanišić, Herkunft
- Goldsmiths Prize: Lucy Ellmann, Ducks, Newburyport
- Gordon Burn Prize: David Keenan for For the Good Times
- Governor General's Award for English-language fiction: Joan Thomas, Five Wives
- Governor General's Award for French-language fiction: Céline Huyghebaert, Le drap blanc
- Governor General's Awards, other categories: See 2019 Governor General's Awards
- Grand Prix du roman de l'Académie française:
- Hugo Award for Best Novel: A Memory Called Empire by Arkady Martine
- International Booker Prize: Jokha Alharthi, Celestial Bodies
- International Dublin Literary Award: Emily Ruskovich, Idaho
- International Prize for Arabic Fiction: Hoda Barakat, The Night Mail
- James Tait Black Memorial Prize for Fiction:
- James Tait Black Memorial Prize for Biography:
- Kerry Group Irish Fiction Award:
- Lambda Literary Awards: Multiple categories; see 31st Lambda Literary Awards.
- Legion of Honour, Chevalier: Michel Houellebecq
- Miguel de Cervantes Prize: Joan Margarit
- Miles Franklin Award: Melissa Lucashenko, Too Much Lip
- National Biography Award (Australia): Behrouz Boochani, No Friend But the Mountains: Writing from Manus Prison
- National Book Award for Fiction:
- National Book Critics Circle Award:
- Nike Award:
- Nobel Prize in Literature: Peter Handke
- Olof Palme Prize: John le Carré
- PEN/Faulkner Award for Fiction:
- PEN Center USA Fiction Award:
- Premio Planeta de Novela:
- Premio Strega:
- Pritzker Literature Award for Lifetime Achievement in Military Writing:
- Prix Goncourt: Jean-Paul Dubois, Tous les hommes n'habitent pas le monde de la même façon
- Pulitzer Prize for Fiction: Richard Powers, The Overstory
- Pulitzer Prize for Poetry:
- Queen's Birthday Honours (UK) James Dover Grant (Lee Child), CBE; Tim Hely Hutchinson, CBE; Bettany Hughes, OBE; Sarah Ann Waters, OBE;
- RBC Taylor Prize: Kate Harris, Lands of Lost Borders: Out of Bounds on the Silk Roads
- Rogers Writers' Trust Fiction Prize:
- SAARC Literary Award:
- Scotiabank Giller Prize: Ian Williams, Reproduction
- Golden Wreath of Struga Poetry Evenings:
- Walter Scott Prize: Robin Robertson, The Long Take
- Whiting Awards:

Fiction:
Nonfiction:
Plays:
Poetry:

- Women's Prize for Fiction: Tayari Jones for An American Marriage
- W.Y. Boyd Literary Award for Excellence in Military Fiction:
- Zbigniew Herbert International Literary Award: Agi Mishol
