= Zeal =

Zeal may refer to:

- Zealotry, fanaticism
  - Zeal of the convert
- Diligence, the theological virtue opposite to acedia
- Zeal (horse), race horse
- Zeal (surname)
- Zeal (web), an internet directory
- Zeal Monachorum, a village in Devon
- South Zeal, village in Devon
- USS Zeal (AM-131), a U.S. Navy minesweeper
- Zeal, an Air New Zealand subsidiary
- Kingdom of Zeal, a kingdom in the Chrono Trigger video game

== See also ==
- Zeals, a village in Wiltshire
- RAF Zeals, a World War II RAF base in Zeals
- Zealot (disambiguation)
