= Geoffrey Holmes (historian) =

English historian (1928–1993)

Geoffrey S. Holmes BA BLitt DLitt FBA FRHistS
- Born: Geoffrey Shorter Holmes; 17 July 1928; Sheffield
- Died: 25 November 1993 (aged 65); Settle, North Yorkshire

Academic background
- Education: Pembroke College, Oxford (BA BLitt)

Academic work
- Discipline: History
- Institutions: University of Glasgow (1952–69); Lancaster University (1969–85)
- Main interests: British politics during the reign of Queen Anne

Geoffrey Shorter Holmes, FBA, FRHistS (17 July 1928 – 25 November 1993) was an English historian of early eighteenth century English politics.

== Academic career ==
Holmes was born in Sheffield, England and educated at Woodhouse Grammar School and Pembroke College, Oxford, graduating with a BA in 1948. He served in the British Army in India before returning to Oxford in 1950 as a research assistant to David Ogg. In 1952 he graduated with a B.Litt.

From 1952 until 1969 he was successively assistant lecturer, lecturer and senior lecturer at Glasgow University's history department. From 1969 until his retirement in 1985 he taught history at Lancaster University, first as reader (1969–72) and then as professor (1973–83). During 1977-1978 he was a visiting fellow at All Souls College, Oxford and was awarded the degree of D.Litt. by the University of Oxford in 1978. He was elected to a Fellowship of the British Academy in 1983 and was a vice-president of the Royal Historical Society (1985–1989).

== British Politics in the Age of Anne ==
Holmes's book on British politics during the reign of Queen Anne (1702–1714) transformed historians' understanding of the period. Whereas G. M. Trevelyan and Sir Keith Feiling had described the politics of Anne's reign as dominated by two parties (Whigs and Tories), Robert Walcott subjected the period to a Namierite analysis and concluded that the period was dominated by various factions based on sectional interests. Walcott's thesis was much criticised and Holmes's book provided a new, more convincing interpretation. Holmes used more than fifty manuscript sources that had been unavailable before 1945.

Holmes argued that the Whig/Tory division that was present during William III's reign crystallised into a more rigid two-party polarisation after 1702. His analysis of the surviving division-lists for the House of Commons refuted Walcott's assertion that MPs were loosely attached to party: of 1,064 MPs all except 130 voted on consistent, partisan Whig/Tory lines. MPs struggled over political principles as well as for places, with the Queen's desire for coalition government largely frustrated except when the strength of the two parties was evenly balanced. Only then could the Court function as a third force. The end of her reign witnessed the grudging acceptance of a two-party system.

Henry Horwitz claimed that Holmes replaced Walcott's work with "a bold yet subtle analysis that puts Augustan politics in truer perspective than ever before". J. P. Kenyon said the book was the "crowning achievement of this new school [of late 17th- and early 18th-century historians], and the only work of political history of this century which can stand alongside Namier's Structure of Politics".

Austin Woolrych said of British Politics in the Age of Anne:

No work of history in our time has won its author a more instant reputation, or more decisively influenced the interpretation of the subject it treats. ... [I]t fairly earned its acclamation as a work of art. ... [I]t is alive with deft character-sketches, sharp detail and apt quotations. Even if it had not effected a major historical revision, as it did, it would deserve to be read as literature. ... It has stood the test of time well.

== Works ==
- Holmes, G.S. (1960), "The Commons' Division on 'No Peace without Spain', 7 December 1711", Historical Research, 33 (88): 223–234, doi:10.1111/j.1468-2281.1960.tb02283.x
- Holmes, G.S.; Speck, W.A. (1965), "The Fall of Harley in 1708 Reconsidered", English Historical Review, 80 (317): 673–698, doi:10.1093/ehr/LXXX.CCCXVII.673 JSTOR
- Holmes, G.S. (1967), British Politics in the Age of Anne, London: Hambledon Press, ISBN 978-0907628743
- Holmes, G.S. (1973), The Trial of Dr Sacheverell, London: Methuen, ISBN 978-0413277503
- Holmes, G.S. (1975), "Sir Robert Walpole", in van Thal, Herbert (ed.), The Prime Ministers: from Sir Robert Walpole to Edward Heath, p. 27, ISBN 9780812817386
- Holmes, G.S. (1976), "The Sacheverell riots: the crowd and the church in early eighteenth-century London", Past and Present, 72: 55–85, doi:10.1093/past/72.1.55 JSTOR
- Holmes, G.S. (1977), "Gregory King and the social structure of pre-industrial England", Transactions of the Royal Historical Society, 27: 41–68, doi:10.2307/3679187, JSTOR 3679187, S2CID 161433158 JSTOR
- Holmes, G.S.; Jones, Clyve (1982), "Trade, the Scots and the Parliamentary Crisis of 1713", Parliamentary History, 1 (1): 47–77, doi:10.1111/j.1750-0206.1982.tb00635.x
- Holmes, G.S. (1983), "Review Article: Eighteenth-Century Toryism", Historical Journal, 26 (3): 755–760, doi:10.1017/S0018246X00021178, S2CID 162328892 online
- Holmes, G.S. (1986), Politics, Religion and Society in England, 1679-1742, London: Hambledon Press, ISBN 978-0907628767 (a collection of his major essays)
- Holmes, G.S. (2009), "Tom Wharton and the Whig Junto: Party Leadership in Late Stuart England", Parliamentary History, 28 (1): 100–114, doi:10.1111/j.1750-0206.2008.00067.x (a previously unpublished lecture)
