= Bernadette McSherry =

Australian legal academic

- Born: June 15, 1961; Melbourne, Australia
- Education: University of Melbourne, Monash University, York University
- Occupations: Lawyer, academic, writer

Bernadette McSherry is a lawyer, writer and Emeritus Professor at the University of Melbourne. She is a Fellow of the Academy of Social Sciences in Australia, Fellow of the Australian Academy of Law and a Commissioner with the Victorian Law Reform Commission.

== Life and career ==
In 1984 McSherry received a Bachelor of Arts (Honours) degree and a Bachelor of Law (Honours) degree from the University of Melbourne, followed by a Master of Law degree in 1990. She was awarded a PhD from York University (Canada) in 1996. Her doctoral thesis was on Insanity, Automatism and Criminal Responsibility. She then completed a Graduate Diploma in Psychology at Monash University in 2001. She is also a 2016 graduate of the online Certificate Program in Novel Writing at Stanford University.

After working as a solicitor at Coltmans and as an Associate for the then Justice James Gobbo at the Supreme Court of Victoria, McSherry commenced her academic career at Monash Law School in 1991. She was appointed in 2005 to the position of Louis Waller Chair of Law and Associate Dean (Research). She became the Director of the Centre for the Advancement of Law and Mental Health in June 2011 and in that year she was elected a Fellow of the Academy of Social Sciences in Australia and a Fellow of the Australian Academy of Law. During her time at Monash University, McSherry was awarded a Vice-Chancellor's Award for Distinguished Teaching and a Vice-Chancellor's Special Commendation for Postgraduate Supervision. From 2013 to mid-2021, she was the Foundation Director of the Melbourne Social Equity Institute at the University of Melbourne. From February 2019 to February 2021 she served as a Commissioner on the Royal Commission into Victoria's Mental Health System. She has been the recipient of six Australian Research Council grants, two Criminology Research Council grants and numerous consultancies. She became an Australian Research Council Federation Fellow in December 2007.

McSherry has co-authored Issues Papers for the Victorian Sentencing Advisory Council and the Law Reform Commission of Victoria and has acted as a consultant on enquiries by other state governments. From 2001, she has served as a Legal Member of the Mental Health Review Board of Victoria (now the Mental Health Tribunal) and was a Legal Member of the Psychosurgery Review Board of Victoria from 2005 to 2010. In 2015, she was a member of the panel reviewing post-sentence detention and supervision of sex offenders in Victoria.

McSherry is an Associate Editor of the International Journal of Law and Mental Health, a member of the editorial committee of member Psychiatry, Psychology and Law and is the co-editor of the Legal Issues Column for the Journal of Law and Medicine.

== Current work ==
McSherry retired from full-time academic work in mid-2021 and retains an honorary position as an Emeritus Professor at Melbourne Law School.

She is currently concentrating on creative writing.

== Personal life ==
McSherry lives in Victoria with her partner and their border collie, Toby. She is an avid Collingwood Football Club supporter and Twitter user.

== Select publications ==
=== Books ===
- 2021, Restrictive Practices in Health Care and Disability Settings, McSherry, B., Maker, Y., (eds), Routledge, ISBN 978-0367376048
- 2017, Principles of Criminal Law, Bronitt, S., McSherry, B., LBC, ISBN 978-0455237909
- 2014, Managing Fear: The Law and Ethics of Preventive Detention and Risk Assessment, McSherry, B., Routledge, ISBN 978-0415632393
- 2013, Coercive Care: Rights, Law and Policy, McSherry, B., Freckelton, I., (eds), Routledge, ISBN 978-0415628198
- 2011, 'Dangerous' People: Policy, Prediction and Practice, McSherry, B., Keyzer, P., (eds), Routledge, ISBN 978-0415884952
- 2010, Rethinking Rights-Based Mental Health Laws, McSherry B., Weller P., (eds), Hart Publishing, ISBN 978-1849460835
- 2009, Confidentiality for Mental Health Professionals: A Guide to Ethical and Legal Principles, Kämpf, A., McSherry, B., Ogloff, J., Rothschild, A., Australian Academic Press, ISBN 978-1921513428
- 2009, Sex Offenders and Preventive Detention, McSherry, B., Keyzer, P., Federation Press, ISBN 978-1862877634
- 2009, Regulating Deviance: The Redirection of Criminalisations and Futures of Criminal Law, McSherry, B., Norrie, A., Bronnitt, S., (eds), Hart Publishing, ISBN 978-1841138909
- 2008, International Trends in Mental Health Laws, McSherry, B., (ed), Federation Press, ISBN 978-1862877214

=== Open access articles ===
- 2014, Throwing Away the Key: The Ethics of Risk Assessment for Preventive Detention Schemes, McSherry B., Routledge, Paper presented at the R. G. Myers Memorial Lecture, Monash University, Melbourne, November 2013.
