= Peachtree Road =

Peachtree Road may refer to:

- The northern end of Peachtree Street, the main street in Atlanta, Georgia
- Peachtree Road (album), a 2004 album by Elton John
- Peachtree Road (novel), a 1988 novel by Anne Rivers Siddons

== See also ==
- Peachtree Road Race, a 10-kilometer run held annually in Atlanta, Georgia on July 4, Independence Day
