= Zealot (disambiguation) =

The Zealots were a political movement in 1st-century Judaism.

Zealot or Zealots may also refer to:

- Zealot (Judaism), Jewish zealotry in the scriptures
- Simon the Zealot, one of the apostles of Jesus Christ
- Zealots of Piety in 17th century Russia
- Zealots of Thessalonica, a radical party in the mid-14th century Byzantine Empire

== Entertainment ==
- Zealot (Wildstorm), a member of the Wildcats fictional superhero team
- Zealot: The Life and Times of Jesus of Nazareth, a book by Reza Aslan
- Zealot: A Book About Cults, a book by Zo Thornely
- The Zealot, an alternate title for the U.S. publication of Simon Scarrow's novel The Eagle in the Sand
- "Zealots", a song on Fugees' album The Score
- Zealot, an album and EP by Muslimgauze; see Bryn Jones discography
- The Zealot one of the four playable classes in Warhammer 40,000: Darktide

== See also ==
- Zeal (disambiguation)
- Zealotry in Jewish history
