= The House Next Door (2006 film) =

- Theatrical release poster
- Based on: The House Next Door by Anne Rivers Siddons
- Written by: Suzette Couture
- Directed by: Jeff Woolnough
- Starring: Mark-Paul Gosselaar; Lara Flynn Boyle; Colin Ferguson
- Theme music composer: Matt Zoller Seitz
- Country of origin: United States
- Original language: English

Production
- Executive producers: Barbara Lieberman; Michael Prupas
- Producers: Wendy Grean; Philip K. Kleinbart; Noelle Volpintesta
- Cinematography: David Herrington
- Editor: Mike Lee
- Running time: 86 minutes
- Production companies: Muse Entertainment Enterprises; Cinema Sound Design; Barbara Lieberman Productions; CBS Paramount Network Television

Original release
- Network: Lifetime
- Release: October 30, 2006

The House Next Door is a 2006 Lifetime Television film, directed by Jeff Woolnough and starring Mark-Paul Gosselaar, Lara Flynn Boyle and Colin Ferguson. The film is based on the 1978 novel of the same name by Anne Rivers Siddons.

== Plot ==
The peaceful and happy life of Walker and Col Kennedy is interrupted when Kim, a brilliant and attractive male architect, builds a dream house next to theirs. All the people who move into the house turn evil or end up having "accidents" and unexplainable deaths. They realize that the house targets their fears and feeds off of them until it drives them insane. In the end, the Kennedys succeed in destroying the house, killing the architect in the process. In the final scene another couple is seen meeting with the contractor who built the house; he shows them the plans, which he still possesses, and offers to build it for them.

== Cast ==
- Lara Flynn Boyle as Col Kennedy
- Colin Ferguson as Walker Kennedy
- Noam Jenkins as Norman Greene
- Julie Stewart as Anita
- Heather Hanson as Claire
- Charlotte Sullivan as Pie Harrelson
- Natalie Lisinska as Eloise
- Heidi von Palleske as Virginia Guthrie
- Aidan Devine as Buck
- Stephen Amell as Buddy Harrelson
- Peter MacNeill
- Mark-Paul Gosselaar as Kim
- Emma Campbell as Suzannah Greene
- Niamh Wilson as Belinda Greene
- Scott Gibson as Roger
- Trevor Bain as Tyler
- Evan Williams as Toby
- Michael Scratch as Josh
- Megan Vincent as Natalie
- Kasia Vassos as Chrissie
- Sean Orr as Charles
- Victoria Fodor as Client
- Jef Mallory as Courier
- Sal Scozzari as TV Installer
- Ben Lewis as Pizza Boy

== Release ==
The film premiered on 30 October 2006 at Lifetime in the United States and was released of DVD in Germany on 29 May 2007.

== Awards ==
Niamh Wilson was nominated as Best Supporting Actress for a Young Artist Award.

== Critical reception ==
The House Next Door was seen as "uninspired" by critics.
