= Lost Feast =

2019 non-fiction book by Lenore Newman

- Hardcover edition
- Author: Lenore Newman
- Language: English
- Publisher: ECW Press
- Publication date: October 8, 2019
- Publication place: Canada
- Media type: Print, e-book
- Pages: 312
- Awards: 2019 ForeWord Magazine Silver Medal; 2020 Taste Canada Silver Award
- ISBN: 9781770414358

Lost Feast: Culinary Extinction and the Future of Food is a 2019 non-fiction culinary book written by Lenore Newman and published by ECW Press. It discusses the history of lost foods that have gone extinct due to human activity and the current issues of culinary extinction risks throughout the world, along with possible ways to avoid these outcomes through food alternatives and better stewardship.

The Taste Canada silver award for culinary narrative books was given to Lost Feast in 2020. A Silver Medal was also given to the book for the nonfiction ecology, and environment category in the 2019 ForeWord Magazine awards.

== Content ==
The book is split across four sections and three to four chapters in each section. Generally, these sections discuss a different era of history and different types of lost foods that were consumed to extinction at some point in human history. This includes the history of the passenger pigeon and of mammoths, one of the earliest extinction events caused by human development. Other foods discussed include the herb silphium which was held in high esteem in Roman and Egyptian cultures, the dodo, the Ansault pear cultivar, and salmon living in Lake Ontario. Additionally, the author discusses the "extinction dinners" they organized that focused on replicating lost foods with modern varieties and foods that are invasive or likely to eventually go extinct if no action is taken. The bluefin tuna is described as a favorite of Newman, but one that is highly likely to be gone within a generation if consumption is not decreased significantly. As an alternative, the author discusses the beneficial potential of cellular agriculture and brands like the Impossible Burger and Beyond Meat in helping reduce the consumption of other forms of food that can be negatively impacted by growing human consumption rates. The issue of lack of biodiversity in modern cultivars is a common topic of discussion in the book and how it might relate to eventual modern extinctions. Newman suggests not only buying heirloom plants but also supporting innovation in the agricultural field, especially indoor agriculture, and expanding the usage of greenhouses.

== Style and tone ==
Writing for the journal Gastronomica, L. Sasha Gora said that Lost Feast helps add to a "growing body of literature" surrounding food and climate change while being "textbook-like in content, but chatty in tone". Sarah E. Tracy in the Literary Review of Canada approves of the "smooth and saucy prose" that makes the book "buzzy, compelling, and genuinely funny". ForeWord Magazine reviewer Rachel Jagareski called the text, especially the footnotes, "engaging and conversational" and that the interviews with other members of the agricultural community are "full of vitality and dialogue" with the culinary subjects discussed having plenty of "wry commentary".

== Critical reception ==
As a part of the 2019 recommended book gifts list, Civil Eats writer Christina Cooke describes the book as one that forces readers to understand their involvement in extinctions past and present and that it presents an "interesting and thought-provoking adventure alongside an engaging, wry-humored narrator". A member of the Culinary Historians of Canada organization, Sylvia Lovegren, highly recommended the book and called it "eye-opening, entertaining and educational". Dana Hansen, an editor for the Hamilton Review of Books, picked Lost Feast as their editor's pick book for the Fall 2019 issue, describing the book as "part culinary romp, part environmental wake-up call" and that it serves as a "critical contribution" to food security knowledge for the public. Booklist's Alice Burton says that Lost Feast teaches readers about needing to adapt to available food supplies and that the best option for humans is to "follow the example of the famed New York 'pizza rat'". Whitney Rothwell in This Magazine stated that foodies would be especially interested in the book thanks to it being "stuffed with tantalizing tidbits of food trivia" that would be useful at any future dinner party.
