= Primer tiempo =

2021 book by Mauricio Macri

Primer Tiempo
- Cover of the first edition
- Author: Mauricio Macri
- Cover artist: Planeta DeAgostini
- Language: Spanish
- Subject: Presidency of Mauricio Macri
- Publisher: Planeta DeAgostini
- Publication date: 2021
- Publication place: Argentina
- Pages: 302

Primer tiempo is a 2021 memoir by Mauricio Macri, president of Argentina from 2015 to 2019.

== Background ==
Mauricio Macri served as president of Argentina from 2015 to 2019, and implemented policies that opposed those of Peronism, which ruled the country for many years before that. He lost the 2019 elections, and Peronism returned to the government. He made little political activities after that point, and wrote the book in secrecy. It was revealed only three months it was out for sale. The idea to write the book was based on A Promised Land, the memoir of US president Barack Obama. Several other Argentine politicians wrote memoirs by this time, such as Cristina Fernández de Kirchner's Sinceramente, Patricia Bullrich's Guerra sin cuartel, Ricardo López Murphy's Más prosperidad, menos incertidumbre and María Eugenia Vidal's Mi camino. The former minister Pablo Avelluto, who helped to order Macri's ideas, thought that Macri is helping to cement a tradition from the United States.

== Sales ==
The book was a huge success. It had four editions on the first week, nearly 85,000 books, and 70% of those were already bought by then. Those statistics did not count the sales of ebooks nor the preorders at the e-commerce page Mercado Libre.

A number of bookstores refused to sell the book for political reasons. "Librería Sudestada", for instance, published an image of the book with a rotten tomato over it, and justified it by blaming Macri for the economic crisis. This was criticised by writers such as Jorge Fernández Díaz, Luis Majul, Marcelo Birmajer, Pola Olaixarac, Martín Kohan and Laura Di Marco, who considered it an authoritarian and antidemocratic reaction.
