= Each (Australian organisation) =

Australian community health organisation

- Each Limited
- Formation: March 1, 1974
- Type: Not-for-profit organisation
- Legal status: Company limited by guarantee
- Purpose: Community health and social services
- Headquarters: Ringwood, Victoria
- Region served: Australia
- Services: Community health; mental health; disability and aged care supports
- Website: www.each.com.au
- Formerly called: Maroondah Social Health Centre; Eastern Access Community Health

Each (formerly EACH; legal name Each Limited) is an Australian not-for-profit community health organisation in Victoria. It was founded in 1974 as the Maroondah Social Health Centre, one of the Whitlam Government's community health centres. In 1998, the MSHC merged with other mental health providers in Melbourne's eastern suburbs to form Eastern Access Community Health (EACH). EACH provides mental health, disability and aged care services.

== History ==
The Maroondah Social Health Centre opened in March 1974 in Ringwood East, in a house owned by the nearby St Stephen's Methodist-Presbyterian Church. Staff included a psychiatrist, physiotherapist, occupational therapist, social worker and clergyman, supported by about forty volunteers. The centre offered counselling and therapy for personal, family and marital problems. Prime Minister Gough Whitlam opened the centre on 1 September 1974 before about 400 people. It had handled 176 cases since March.

In 1998 the Maroondah Social Health Centre merged with other mental health providers in Melbourne's eastern suburbs, including the Outer East Council for Developing Services in Mental Health and the Healesville Adult Day Care Centre, to form Eastern Access Community Health (EACH).

In November 2007, Each published Homes at risk: using bankruptcy to collect small debts, a report on creditor-initiated bankruptcies that the Senate Legal and Constitutional Affairs Legislation Committee cited in its 2009 inquiry into the Bankruptcy Legislation Amendment Bill 2009. Chief executive Peter Ruzyla gave evidence to the Royal Commission into Victoria's Mental Health System in 2019.

Each proposed in 2018 to redevelop the historic Trawool Estate near Seymour, Victoria as a residential drug and alcohol rehabilitation facility. Residents raised concerns about safety and the strain on local infrastructure, and said they had not been adequately consulted.

The Victorian Department of Health launched a statewide virtual women's health clinic in June 2025, run by Each with specialist nurses. Phone or video consultations are available to women across Victoria for conditions including endometriosis, pelvic pain and menopause, as well as reproductive health services such as cervical screening and medical abortion. The clinic focused particularly on women in regional and remote areas, where such services had been hard to reach.

== See also ==
- Community health centre
- Primary health care
- Health care in Australia
