= The Good War: Why We Couldn't Win the War or the Peace in Afghanistan =

2014 book by Jack Fairweather

- Author: Jack Fairweather
- Language: English
- Genre: Non-fiction
- Publisher: Basic Books
- Publication date: 2014
- Media type: First edition

The Good War: Why We Couldn’t Win the War or the Peace in Afghanistan is a 2014 book by British writer Jack Fairweather, a former Washington Post war correspondent, about the recent War in Afghanistan.
