= Evan Fraser (academic) =

Canadian geographer

Evan Fraser is a Canadian author and geographer. He is a professor of geography at the University of Guelph and the director of the Arrell Food Institute.

== Biography ==
Evan Fraser attended the University of Toronto, where he earned a BA (Hons) in Anthropology, followed by an MSc in Forestry. He then attended the University of British Columbia, where he completed a PhD in Resource Management and Environmental Studies in 2002. Following graduation, he worked in a policy institute before moving to the United Kingdom in 2003 to begin his academic career as a Lecturer in Sustainable Development at the University of Leeds, working on topics relating to farming and climate change.

Fraser moved to the University of Guelph in 2010 to take up a Canada Research Chair in Global Food Security. He is a professor in the Department of Geography, Environment and Geomatics, and he serves as Director of the Arrell Food Institute at the University of Guelph. He is also scientific director of the Food from Thought initiative, a research project that explores ways to transform the global food system to increase sustainability and productivity and to use big data to reduce the environmental footprint of agricultural production.

In 2014, Fraser was named a Fellow of the Pierre Elliot Trudeau Foundation. He was also named to the inaugural cohort of the Royal Society of Canada's College of New Scholars, and he is a Fellow of the Royal Canadian Geographical Society.

As a researcher, Fraser is a co-author on over 100 academic papers and book chapters. He has also co-authored four non-fiction books about food and food security. His first book, Beef: The Untold Story of How Milk, Meat, and Muscle Shaped the World, was co-authored with journalist Andrew Rimas and first published in 2008. His second book, Empires of Food: Feast, Famine, and the Rise and Fall of Civilizations, also co-authored with Andrew Rimas, was published in 2010 and shortlisted for the James Beard Food Literature Award. His third book, Uncertain Harvest: The Future of Food on a Warming Planet, was co-authored with Ian Mosby and Sarah Rotz and published in 2020 by the University of Regina Press. His fourth book, Dinner on Mars: The Technologies That Will Feed the Red Planet and Transform Agriculture on Earth, was co-authored with Dr. Lenore Newman and published in 2022 by ECW Press.

Fraser created a web video series, "Feeding Nine Billion," which discuss the food systems needed to feed the projected global population in 2050. He self-published a graphic novel called #FoodCrisis about a fictitious food crisis that hits North America in the 2020s. He also created a card game about global food security, which won a gold medal at the International "Serious Play" conference. These multimedia materials form the basis for high school lesson plans on food systems, and are now used in classrooms around the world.

Fraser is a member and former co-chair of the Canadian Food Policy Advisory Council, which advises the Minister of Agriculture and Agri-Food on the implementation of the Food Policy for Canada. In 2023, Fraser was appointed to the steering committee of the High-Level Panel of Experts on Food Security and Nutrition (HLPE-FSN) of the United Nations Committee on World Food Security.

== Published works ==
- Beef: The Untold Story of How Milk, Meat, and Muscle Shaped the World, co-authored with Andrew Rimas. Harper Collins/William Morrow, 2008.
- Empires of Food: Feast, Famine, and the Rise and Fall of Civilizations, co-authored with Andrew Rimas. New York: Free Press, 2010.
- Uncertain Harvest: The Future of Food on a Warming Planet, co-authored with Ian Mosby and Sarah Rotz. Regina: University of Regina Press, 2020.
- Dinner on Mars: The Technologies That Will Feed the Red Planet and Transform Agriculture on Earth, co-authored with Lenore Newman. Toronto: ECW Press, 2022.
