= Vivian Shaw =

Science fiction writer

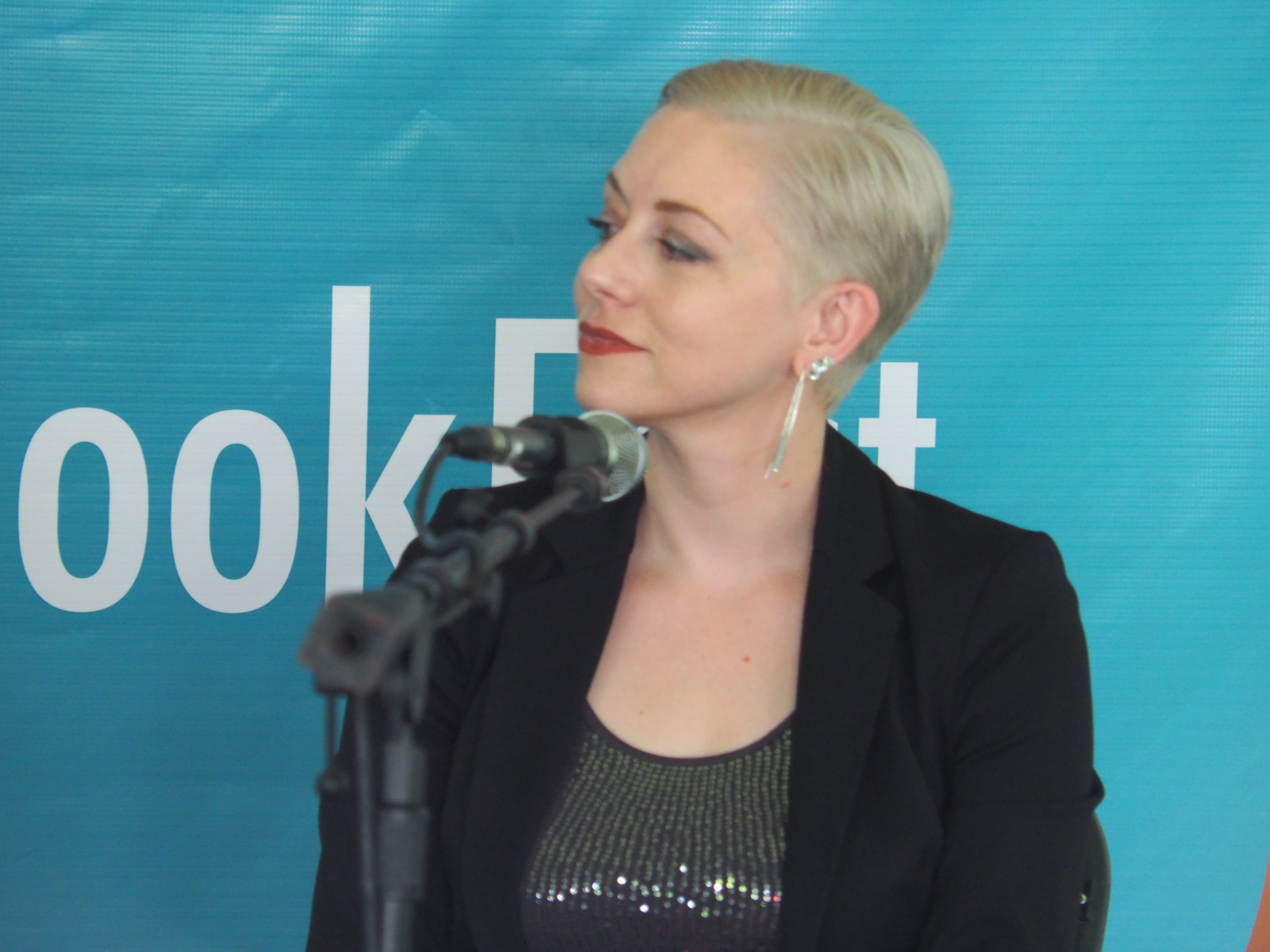
- Shaw in 2019
- Born: Kenya
- Occupation: Author
- Writing career
- Genre: science fiction
- Website: www.vivianshaw.net

Vivian Shaw is a science fiction writer. She is best known for her series following the fictional doctor Greta Helsing who operates a clinic in London for special-needs clients with supernatural abilities. She drew inspiration from the classical vampire literature for her works. She was born in Kenya and currently resides in Santa Fe, New Mexico with her wife.

== Literary career ==
Shaw is known for her critically acclaimed trilogy of novels about the fictional doctor Greta Helsing, who has a clinic in London for special-needs clients with supernatural abilities. Shaw's first novel, Strange Practice, was listed by the NPR Book Concierge as one of the Best Books of 2017. In the sequel, Dreadful Company, Greta Helsing travels to Paris. Dreadful Company appeared on the 2018 Locus recommended reading list. In the third book, Grave Importance, Greta Helsing temporarily directs an exclusive mummy spa near Marseille.

== Literary influences ==
Strange Practice and its sequels reference many characters from classic vampire literature, including Lord Ruthven, Sir Francis Varney, and Abraham Van Helsing. In an interview with the journalist Liz Bourke, Shaw stated that she once wished to be a doctor like her protagonist, and reads medical textbooks for fun.

== Bibliography ==
- The Helios Syndrome (2023)

=== Greta Helsing series ===
1. Strange Practice (2017)
2. Dreadful Company (2018)
3. Grave Importance (2019)
4. Bitter Waters (2024)
5. Strange New World (2025)

=== Short fiction ===
- "The Utmost Bound" (2018)
- "Black Matter" (2019)
- "Transference" (2022)

== Personal life ==
Shaw was born in Kenya, and lived in the United Kingdom before moving to the United States at age of seven. She received a B.A. in Art History from St. Mary's College of Maryland in 2002, and M.F.A. in Creative Writing & Publishing Arts from the University of Baltimore in 2013. She and her wife, fellow author Arkady Martine, lived initially in Baltimore and as of 2020 live in Santa Fe, New Mexico. She also is a freelance editor and graphic designer.
