= Rose/House =

2023 sci-fi mystery novella by Arkady Martine

- Author: Arkady Martine
- Language: English
- Publisher: Subterranean Press
- Publication date: 2023

Rose/House is a 2023 science fiction mystery novella by American author Arkady Martine. It was first published by Subterranean Press.

== Synopsis ==
When architect Basit Deniau died, his will stated that all his many artistic and cultural treasures were to be kept within his final creation, Rose House, a superintelligent smart home in the Mojave desert—and that the only person who would ever be allowed inside was his estranged former student, Selene Gisil, who could visit for up to 7 days per year.

In accordance with legislation regarding duty of care from artificial intelligences, Rose House has just notified local police that a dead body has been unattended within its premises for more than 24 hours. Selene Gisil would be the obvious suspect, except that she has been in Turkey for over a month. Now detective Maritza Smith must figure out how someone could have been killed within Rose House, where no one—including herself—is ever granted access.

== Reception ==
Rose/House was a finalist for the 2024 Hugo Award for Best Novella.

Publishers Weekly called it "staggering", and "a twisted cathedral of story" that is filled with "equal parts beauty and a creeping, inescapable sense of wrongness", comparing it to "Shirley Jackson's Hill House as designed by Frank Gehry." James Nicoll likewise drew parallels with Hill House, and emphasized that although Rose/House is "a homage, [it] is in no sense derivative": "Having read [The Haunting of Hill House] may provide insight into the character of Rose House's AI. It will not provide any foreshadowing of the events that play out."

== External ==
- Rose/House title listing at the Internet Speculative Fiction Database
