= Sweetwater Creek (novel) =

2005 novel by Anne Rivers Siddons

- First edition cover
- Author: Anne Rivers Siddons
- Audio read by: Anna Fields
- Publisher: HarperCollins
- ISBN: 978-0-06-621335-4

Sweetwater Creek is a 2005 novel by American writer Anne Rivers Siddons. It is the story of a girl named Emily who survives her mother's abandonment and her older brother's suicide. She finds purpose in training her father's spaniels and takes refuge in the magic of Sweetwater Creek. A new friend enters Emily's life in the person of Lulu, a troubled daughter of privilege whose secrets threaten to destroy Emily's beautiful new world.

== Reception ==
Publishers Weekly wrote that it was a "capable but uninspired story of a young girl's coming-of-age on the family plantation".

Booklist reviewed the audiobook narrated by American actress Anna Fields.
