= A Desolation Called Peace =

2021 novel by Arkady Martine

- Cover art for A Desolation Called Peace
- Author: Arkady Martine
- Language: English
- Series: Teixcalaan
- Release number: 2
- Genre: Science fiction
- Publisher: Tor books
- Publication date: 2 March 2021
- Publication place: United States
- Media type: Print, ebook
- Pages: 496 (Hardcover)
- ISBN: 978-1-250-18646-1
- Preceded by: A Memory Called Empire

A Desolation Called Peace is a 2021 space opera science fiction novel by Arkady Martine. It is the sequel to A Memory Called Empire, and the second novel in Martine's Teixcalaan series. Like its predecessor, the book won the Hugo Award for Best Novel. It also won the 2022 Locus Award for Best Science Fiction Novel.

== Synopsis ==
A few months after A Memory Called Empire, alien forces massacre an industrial colony of the Teixcalaanli Empire. The Teixcalaanli admiral Nine Hibiscus, tasked with confronting the threat, requests an Information Ministry specialist to attempt to communicate with the inscrutable enemy. That specialist is Three Seagrass, now a senior Imperial official, who smuggles herself to the frontlines by way of Lsel Station. There, she convinces her former associate and still nominal ambassador to the Empire, Mahit Dzmare, to accompany her. Mahit seizes on the chance to escape the increasing danger from factional conflicts on Lsel, and she is tasked by one of Lsel's leaders to sabotage first-contact efforts in order to prolong the Empire's war with the aliens.

In Nine Hibiscus's fleet, the two women develop methods to communicate with the aliens and restart their romantic relationship. With the aid of Nine Hibiscus's adjutant, Twenty Cicada, they establish a line of communication to the enemy, who turn out to be a hive mind that does not understand the personhood of individuals. Their fragile truce is almost foiled when a rebellious fleet captain Sixteen Moonrise launches an attack with weapons of mass destruction against one of the enemy's home planets even ignoring the orders of Eight Antidote, the emperor's young heir, back in the capital. This forces Nine Hibiscus to give coordinates of Sixteen Moonrise fleet to the alien hivemind resulting in the fleet's destruction(However, promising to keep casualties at minimum). An uneasy truce is established. As the prospect of further war recedes, Mahit considers a future in the Empire after getting exiled from Lsel.

== Major themes ==
Continuing with themes from the first book in the series, the book tackles subjects conquest and colonialism, what constitutes language, and personal connection to culture and institutions. The book also introduces new themes such as collective consciousness.

The title alludes to a famous phrase by Tacitus who quotes a Caledonian chieftain describing the policies of the Roman Empire: solitudinem faciunt, pacem appellant – "they make a wasteland and call it peace".

== Reception ==
In his starred BookPage review, Noah Fram compares how Martine’s debut effort showcased her talents in creating a gripping narrative, blending humor and consummate world building, to the more cerebral thematic exploration in A Desolation Called Peace, which he writes features "some of the cleverest and most elegant foreshadowing in modern science fiction." He predicts that as well-deserving of the Hugo Award A Memory Called Empire was, Desolation "might just eclipse it."

According to Martin Cahill in Tor.com the novel is both an action-packed space opera and a "thoughtful, complicated examination of identity, language, personhood, and truth." Lisa Tuttle in The Guardian wrote that it was "first-class space opera, with added spycraft, diplomatic intrigue and scary aliens, along with interesting explorations of perception, ways of communicating, and what makes a person."

=== Awards and honors ===
Year	Award	Category	Result	Ref.
2021	BSFA Award	Novel	Finalist	
2021	Dragon Award	Best Science Fiction Novel	Nominated	
2021	Nebula Award	Novel	Finalist	
2022	Arthur C. Clarke Award	—	Shortlisted	
2022	Hugo Award	Novel	Won	
2022	Lambda Literary Award	Speculative Fiction	Finalist	
2022	Locus Award	Science Fiction Novel	Won	
