= Keeper (Appelt novel) =

2010 novel by Kathi Appelt

- Author: Kathi Appel
- Illustrator: August Hall
- Cover artist: August Hall
- Language: English
- Genre: Children's literature Fantasy
- Publisher: Atheneum Books for Young Readers
- Publication date: 2010
- Publication place: United States
- English publication date: 2010
- Pages: 399
- ISBN: 978-1-4169-5060-8

Keeper is a 2010 novel written by Kathi Appelt. This story is about a young girl who searches for her mermaid mother, Meggie Marie.

== Summary ==
After unintentionally ruining a blue moon day by messing up her guardian's crab gumbo and breaking her favorite wooden bowl, causing a friend's ukulele to break, as well as wrecking the plants of her elderly neighbor, Keeper decides to make everything right. Taking with her seven wooden figurines of different mermaids, her dog BD, and a charm she had since she was a girl, Keeper sets out to find her mermaid mother, Meggie Marie, who has not been seen in seven years. Keeper finds out that her mother actually was not a mermaid but Keeper does get her share of magic after all.

== Characters ==
- Keeper: The protagonist of the story. Keeper's mother is Meggie Marie, a mermaid who swam away seven years ago. Since then, she has been living with Signe, her appointed guardian. She is an official "waxwing" for Dogie, has black hair, and is ten-years-old. Apparently, she was born in the water. Her nicknames are "Sweet Pea", "Good'un", and "Mergirl"; the latter was used by her mother.
- Signe: Keeper's guardian, who had raised a Keeper since her mother went missing. Signe is originally from Iowa, has white hair, and is twenty-five-years-old (she was fifteen when Keeper was born and eighteen when Meggie Marie left). She owned a wooden bowl that was broken by Keeper at the beginning of the book. The bowl was owned by Signe's mother, who died in a car accident along with Signe's father. Signe escaped from Iowa with the wooden bowl her only possession.
- Dogie: A friend and neighbor of Keeper's, who owns a surf shop called "The Bus", that is literally a bus. He has loved Signe for some time, and on the day of the blue moon, he was going to sing to her to marry him by playing his ukulele. He often stutters. His dog, Too, can predict storms and trouble. Too woke up Dogie at night when he found Keeper in the boat all alone. In the book's illustrations, Dogie is shown to be African American. He was from New Jersey and had joined the army. When Dogie came home from the army, he was shaking hard but a hug from a loved family member cured him; now only his voice stutters. When he sings while playing the ukulele, he does not stutter. He has two known relatives: his mother and an uncle named Sylvester.
- Mr. Henri Beauchamp: An elderly neighbor of Keeper's, who is an expert on mermaid stories. He is the owner of a one-eyed cat named Sinbad. He had owned many flowers, one of them being a night-blooming cereus, and they were all knocked over and destroyed when Sinbad was being chased by BD. He is from Saintes-Maries-de-la-Mer. Long ago when he was 15, he met the merboy Jack before sailing across the ocean with around 20 circus ponies.
- BD: A dog owned by Keeper and Signe. He is friends with a seagull named Captain. In the book, BD goes with Keeper to help find her mother. His name is short for "Best Dog".
- Too: A little dog owned by Dogie. His name was originally "Best Dog Too". He is also known as a Storm Prognosticator. He can also predict trouble.
- Jacques de Mer/Jack: A merman and a lover of Mr. Beauchamp's. He might be the son of Yemaya, as she demands a gift after someone makes a wish whenever she appears.
- Sinbad: A one-eyed cat owned by Mr. Beauchamp. He usually taunts the dog and is very old. Mr. Beauchamp claims that Sinbad comes from a "long line of pirate cats".
- Captain: A resident seagull. He had crashed through the window of Keeper's home one stormy night with a broken wing five years before the events in the book. It was Signe who nursed him back to health. He is friends with BD. His favorite food is watermelon. Watermelon taught him to fly again, because Captain was on the second story with his broken wing while Signe left watermelon for him on the first story,
- Meggie Marie: The mother of Keeper, Meggie Marie had vanished seven years prior to the events in the book. According to a later chapter in the book, Meggie Marie had been told to leave by Signe after the former had almost drowned Keeper on her third birthday (if it was intentional is not known). She was first thought to be a mermaid, but then Keeper finds out that she was not. The house that she, Keeper, and Signe lived in belonged to her grandmother.
