= Emily Ruskovich =

American writer

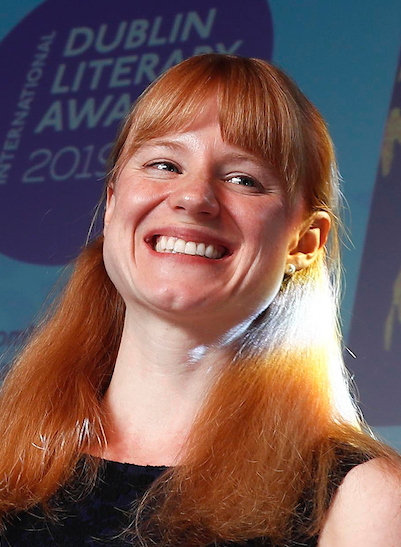
- Alma mater: Iowa Writers' Workshop
- Occupations: Writer; Novelist; University teacher
- Writing career
- Language: English
- Notable awards: Dublin Literary Award (2019)

Emily Ruskovich (/ˈrʌskəvɪtʃ/ RUSS-kə-vitch) is an American writer who won the 2019 International Dublin literary award for her novel Idaho. She grew up in the Idaho Panhandle on Hoodoo Mountain.

She graduated from the Iowa Writers’ Workshop in 2011 and is an assistant professor at the University of Montana where she teaches creative writing; she was formerly on the faculty of Boise State University. She lives in the mountains west of Missoula, Montana.

== Career ==
=== Writer ===
Ruskovich's short fiction has appeared in literary journals including Zoetrope, One Story, The Virginia Quarterly Review, The Paris Review, The New York Times, and LitHub. In 2015, she won the O. Henry Award for her short story "Owl".

Her debut novel Idaho, published by Random House in January 2017, became a Los Angeles Times bestseller and a New York Times Editor's Choice. The novel was also selected as a Barnes & Noble Great New Writers Selection and an Amazon Book of the Month.

=== Teacher ===
Ruskovich served as the James C. McCreight Fiction Fellow at the University of Wisconsin-Madison from 2011 to 2012. She has taught creative writing at the University of Colorado in Denver. From 2017 to 2021, she was an assistant professor in the MFA program in creative writing at Boise State University. She is currently an assistant professor at the University of Montana, having joined the faculty in the fall of 2021.

== Bibliography ==
=== Novel ===
- Idaho (2017)

=== Short story ===
- Owl (2014)
- What Liesel Thinks of Horses (2014)

=== Work included in anthology ===
- The O. Henry Prize stories, 2015 (2015)

== Awards ==
- 2015 O. Henry Award for her short story "Owl"
- 2018 Pacific Northwest Book Award
- 2019 International Dublin Literary Award
- Idaho Book Award

== Personal life ==
Ruskovich lives in the mountains of western Montana with her husband Sam McPhee and their three children.
