= The Underneath (novel) =

2008 children's book by Kathi Appelt

- Author: Kathi Appelt
- Illustrator: David Small
- Cover artist: David Blane
- Language: English
- Genre: Children's literature Fantasy
- Publisher: Atheneum Books for Young Readers
- Publication date: 2008
- Publication place: United States
- Pages: 313
- ISBN: 978-1-4169-5058-5
- OCLC: 166386966
- LC Class: PZ7.A6455 Un 2008

The Underneath is a children's book by Kathi Appelt. It tells the story of an abandoned cat who goes to live with a maltreated hound dog underneath a crooked old house in a bayou on the border between Louisiana and Texas. Published in 2008, The Underneath is a John Newbery Honor book, ALA Notable Children's Book and a National Book Award Finalist.

== Concept and development ==
The novel originally started as a short story about a boy, a cat, and a shard of Caddo pottery. Her agent encouraged Appelt to expand the story to a novel instead. The plot soon changed to focus on the cat instead and the boy disappeared from the plot. Appelt ended up drawing inspiration from the setting of the bayou itself, as well as some inspiration from Caddo legends, who lived in that region. She admitted that the creation of the character Grandmother Moccasin may have been driven by her fear of snakes. Appelt also stated that she drew inspiration from The Jungle Book, not for its plot but for its themes and how it tackled ideas that you wouldn't expect from a children's book.

== Plot ==
The story takes place underneath a ramshackle house, in the bayou near the Texas-Louisiana border. The hound dog, Ranger, is chained under the porch. Ever since his leg was shot accidentally by his evil owner, Gar Face, Ranger has been chained up to serve only as a warning system. Ranger meets a calico cat who has kittens, and he names the kittens "Sabine" and "Puck". The kittens are told to never leave the underside of the porch, otherwise Gar Face might use them as alligator bait. One day, Puck accidentally leaves the safety of the porch and is caught by Gar Face. While trying to protect Puck, the calico is also caught. Gar Face throws the two into a bag, which he then throws into the river. Although Puck is saved, the mother drowns trying to help him. She encounters a hummingbird, who are known to accompany the spirits of the dead to the other side. Puck later wanders off and ends up lost.

The book also introduces Grandmother Moccasin, who in this story is portrayed as a water moccasin lamia. When her daughter Night Song changes form to marry Hawk Man, Grandmother feels betrayed and tricks her daughter into changing back into a serpent, since magical creatures who return to their original forms are stuck that way forever. Hawk Man then traps Grandmother in a clay jar for what she did, where she stews in her bitterness and anger. The Alligator King is an alligator who was friends with Grandmother Moccasin before her imprisonment, who also happens to be the alligator that Gar Face is trying to lure using Ranger. When storms release Grandmother, she decides to do something unexpected. She sees the love between the kittens and the hound, and frees Ranger from where he is chained. However, she is hit by a stray bullet from Gar Face. As she lays dying, she is at last reunited by her granddaughter Rainbow Bird, who took the form of a hummingbird. The Alligator King eventually eats Gar Face.

== Characters ==
- Ranger An old hound dog who is chained up underneath the house
- Gar Face Ranger's owner whose goal is to catch the alligator living in the bayou
- Calico cat mother The nameless cat who gives birth to Sabine and Puck
- Sabine the kitten who stays with Ranger under the house (girl)
- Puck the kitten who left to explore and lost his way(boy)
- Grandmother Moccasin - a lamia who is trapped in a clay jar
- Night Song Grandmother Moccasin's daughter who is also a lamia
- Rainbow Bird a hummingbird with the ability to accompany spirits to the other side, who is also searching for someone, who is also Night Song's daughter
- Hawk Man Night Songs husband
- Alligator King the oldest alligator known to man also friends with Grandmother Moccasin

== Critical reception ==
Horn Book Magazine called it a "lyrical, circling narrative" that stands out because of "the originality of the story and the fresh beauty of its author’s voice". Kirkus Reviews called it a "magical tale of betrayal, revenge, love and the importance of keeping promises". Scholastic said "this harrowing yet sweet story is a tale about the power of love and hate". Booklist admitted that some readers "may struggle with Appelt’s repeated phrases and poetic fragments" but that most "will be pulled forward by the vulnerable pets’ survival adventure". However the School Library Journal gave a more lukewarm review, stating that "the pace of this book is meandering" and calls the book "a leisurely, often discouraging journey to what is ultimately an appropriate ending".

== Awards ==
- John Newbery Honor Book 2009
- 2009 ALA Notable Children's Book
- National Book Award Finalist 2008
