= A Memory Called Empire =

2019 novel by Arkady Martine

- Cover art for A Memory Called Empire
- Author: Arkady Martine
- Language: English
- Series: Teixcalaan
- Genre: Science fiction
- Publisher: Tor Books
- Publication date: 26 March 2019
- Publication place: United States
- Media type: Print, ebook
- Pages: 462 (Hardcover)
- ISBN: 978-1-250-18643-0
- Followed by: A Desolation Called Peace

A Memory Called Empire is a 2019 science fiction novel, the debut novel by Arkady Martine. It follows Mahit Dzmare, the ambassador from Lsel Station to the Teixcalaanli Empire, as she investigates the death of her predecessor and the instabilities that underpin that society. The book won the 2020 Compton Crook Award and the 2020 Hugo Award for Best Novel.

== Plot ==
Ambassador Mahit Dzmare is sent from Lsel Station, an independent republic, to become the next Ambassador to the Teixcalaanli Empire. She carries a copy of the consciousness of Yskandr Aghavn, the previous Ambassador, in an "imago-machine" which is implanted in her skull. Because Yskandr was unable to return to Lsel before his death, his memories are fifteen years out of date.

On Teixcalaan, Mahit meets her diplomatic liaison Three Seagrass and Three Seagrass's friend Twelve Azalea. Mahit realizes that her imago has been sabotaged and loses her ability to access Yskandr's memories. Mahit is saved from an assassination attempt by Nineteen Adze, a close advisor to the Emperor. Emperor Six Direction is elderly and near death, leading to a succession crisis. The Empire announces a plan to annex Lsel.

Mahit retrieves an imago machine from Yskandr's corpse, accessing his up-to-date memories. Mahit learns that Yskandr promised the Emperor an imago machine; Yskandr was murdered by an advisor who believed that no emperor should be immortal. Mahit also learns of a looming alien invasion. She convinces the Emperor that this invasion is a threat to the Empire; he calls off the annexation of Lsel in order to focus on this new threat. Twelve Azalea and hundreds of other Teixcalaanlitzlim are killed as civil unrest mounts and various generals and aristocrats seek to claim the throne. The Emperor commits ritual suicide to quell the succession crisis, and Nineteen Adze ascends the throne as regent for Six Direction's clone. Mahit requests a transfer back to Lsel.

== Major themes ==
In the New York Times, Amal el-Mohtar reported that the novel explores the intersection between our past and future selves. It looks at language, grammar, and custom, things that are intertwined with the politics of conquest and the broader culture.

The Verge observed that the book discusses how institutional memory guides society and shapes politics, and provides insight into the ideas of conquest and colonialism by comparing the different worldviews of the expansion-minded Teixcalaanli Empire and the fiercely independent Lsel Stationers.

Tor.com emphasized the degree to which Mahit is perceived as a "barbarian" by the Teixcalaanli.

The author, a former Byzantine historian, draws from several real-life empires, including the Byzantine Empire and Aztec Empire, as well as concepts from Central Asian empires; in particular, the culture and history of Lsel Station are deeply inspired by the medieval Armenian Kingdom of Ani. Martine, who holds a Master of Studies in Classical Armenian Studies from the University of Oxford, weaves into the novel themes of cultural resistance, hybridity, and identity shaped by her research on Byzantine–Armenian relations, especially the annexation of Ani by Byzantium in 1044 AD. Martine's Armenian influences extend to the linguistic and symbolic fabric of the novel. The Stationer names, such as Mahit Dzmare and Yskandr Aghavn, reflect Armenian phonetic and etymological resonances. For example, "Mahit Dzmare" may evoke the Armenian words mah (մահ, "death") and dzmer (ձմեռ, "winter"). The term "Lsel" itself may derive from the Armenian verb lsel (լսել "to listen"), emphasizing cultural memory and oral tradition.

Martine dedicated the book "to anyone who has ever loved a culture that absorbs their own. And to Grigor III Pahlavuni and Peter I Getadardz, through the centuries."

Publishers Weekly gave the novel a starred review, calling it a "gorgeously crafted space opera", and lauding its worldbuilding and backstory. Kirkus Reviews stated that the novel was "a confident beginning" and compared it positively to the works of Ann Leckie and Yoon Ha Lee.

== Awards and honors ==
Year	Award	Category	Result	Ref.
2019	Dragon Award	Science Fiction Novel	Nominated	
2019	Nebula Award	Novel	Finalist	
2020	Arthur C. Clarke Award	—	Shortlisted	
2020	Compton Crook Award	—	Won	
2020	Hugo Award	Novel	Won	
2020	Locus Award	First Novel	Finalist	

== Sequel ==
The sequel A Desolation Called Peace was published in March 2021. Set a few months after the events of A Memory Called Empire, the action takes place in part on the Jewel of the World, but also at Lsel station and mostly in the warships on the boundary of the Teixcalaan universe. Mahit and Three Seagrass go there to negotiate with an unknown species. Like the first book, A Desolation Called Peace won the Hugo Award for Best Novel.
