= Zeal (surname) =

Zeal is an English surname, derived from a southwestern form (with voicing of the initial consonant) of Old English words for sallow, willow or hall; or alternatively from seal(-maker).

Notable people with the surname include:

- Sir William Zeal (1830–1912), Australian engineer and politician
- Kelechi Iheanacho Zeal (born 1981), Nigerian footballer
