= The House Next Door (novel) =

Book by Anne Rivers Siddons

- First edition
- Author: Anne Rivers Siddons
- Language: English
- Genre: Horror
- Set in: Atlanta, Georgia
- Publisher: Simon & Schuster
- Publication date: 1978
- Publication place: United States
- Media type: Print
- Pages: 346
- ISBN: 0345323335
- OCLC: 769166101
- Dewey Decimal: 813.54
- LC Class: PZ4.S5682

The House Next Door is a 1978 horror novel written by Anne Rivers Siddons. It was first published by Simon & Schuster and became a New York Times bestseller. Set in Atlanta, Georgia, the story is told from the point of view of a woman who suspects a terrible force resides in the house next door. In 2006, it was adapted into a made-for-TV movie starring Lara Flynn Boyle and Mark-Paul Gosselaar.

== Plot summary ==
The novel is written from the point of view of Colquitt "Col" Kennedy, a well-to-do middle-aged woman who lives with her husband Walter in a quiet, affluent Atlanta neighborhood. They learn from a neighbor that a contemporary home is going up on the lot next to theirs. Colquitt and Walter are dismayed at their loss of privacy and quiet, but resigned to the inevitable. They meet the architect and owners shortly after learning about the home, see the plans, and decide it is a beautiful house.

Soon, Colquitt suspects a terrible force resides in the house next door.

In just under two years, three owners — the Harralsons, Sheehans, and Greenes — have their lives destroyed by scandal, madness, and murder while living in the home. Even those who only visit the house — including Colquitt and Walter — find themselves as the victims of a shocking tragedy. They decide to go public with their story — and risk their own reputations and careers — to warn others about the power of the house.

However, the house is now powerful enough to protect itself. By telling the world, the Kennedys have summoned its dangerous wrath.

The novel ends with Colquitt and Walter awaiting their (presumed) deaths in the house, after killing its architect (who, they discover [and unknown to him], is a carrier of the evil that's in the house — and that evil will infect everything he builds for the rest of his life).

== Responses ==
In his book Danse Macabre, noted horror author Stephen King writes at length on the novel, saying it is a contemporary ghost story with Southern Gothic roots and one of the best genre novels of the 20th century. King's extensive synopsis is supplemented by a detailed statement written by Siddons herself that explores some of the novel's themes.

In 2006, The House Next Door was adapted into a made-for-TV movie starring Lara Flynn Boyle and Mark-Paul Gosselaar. The adaptation was seen as "uninspired" by critics. It currently holds a 27% "rotten" rating on RottenTomatoes.com
