= Ian Dewhirst =

English historian (1936–2019)

- Born: 17 October 1936; Keighley, West Yorkshire, England
- Died: 20 January 2019 (aged 82); Keighley, West Yorkshire, England
- Occupation: Historian

Ian Dewhirst MBE (born 17 October 1936 – 20 January 2019) was an accredited local historian, author and public speaker from Keighley, West Yorkshire. He appeared on television programmes, and contributed to newspapers and magazines.

Dewhirst has written countless books about Yorkshire; many being based on the history of his town. He wrote a weekly column entitled 'Memory Lane' in the towns' newspaper, The Keighley News. Subsequently, he has affectionately become known as Mr Keighley, and in 2009, he had a train named in his honour.

== Life and education ==
Ian Dewhirst was born in Keighley in West Yorkshire in 1936. He attended Keighley Boys' Grammar School and subsequently went on to graduate in Honours English at the University of Manchester in 1958. Ian's own reminiscences of his life can be seen in his article for mercurymoviemakers entitled "Reminiscences of Ian Dewhirst MBE".

From 1965-1967, he was Lending Librarian at Keighley Library, then in 1967 became Reference Librarian, remaining in the same post until he took early retirement in 1991.

Dewhirst died in January 2019.

== Awards and honours ==
Ian was awarded an MBE in 1999 in recognition of his services to local history. He has received an Honorary Doctor of Letters from the University of Bradford, and has had a local train named in his honour.

== Books and publications ==
- A Century of Yorkshire Dialect: Selections from the "Transactions of the Yorkshire Dialect Society"
- A History of Keighley
- Scar Top: And other poems
- The handloom weaver and other poems
- Yorkshire Through the Years
- You Don't Remember Bananas
- Victorian Keighley Characters
- Gleanings from Victorian Yorkshire
- Gleanings From Edwardian Yorkshire
- In the Reign of the Peacemaker:
- Keighley and District in Edwardian Photographs
- Keighley at War:
- Keighley in Old Picture Postcards
- Keighley in the 1930s and 40s
- More Old Keighley in Photographs
- The Story of a Nobody: A Working Class Life, 1880–1939
- Old Keighley in Photographs
