= Thomas Habinek =

American historian and classical scholar (1953-2019)

- Born: December 25, 1953
- Died: January 19, 2019 (aged 65)
- Occupations: Historian; classical scholar

Academic background
- Education: Princeton University (AB); Harvard University (PhD)

Thomas Habinek (December 25, 1953 – January 19, 2019) was an American classical scholar.

He specialized in Latin literature and Roman cultural history.

== Life and career ==
Habinek received his AB in classics from Princeton University in 1975, and later completed his PhD in classical philology from Harvard University in 1981.

He was a professor of classics at University of Southern California from 1992 to 2019, and received two fellowships from the American Council of Learned Societies and the Associates' Award for Excellence in Teaching. He died on January 19, 2019, at the age of 65.

== Bibliography ==
Some of his books are:

- Ancient Rhetoric and Oratory
- The World of Roman Song: From Ritualized Speech to Social Order
- The Politics of Latin Literature: Writing, Identity, and Empire in Ancient Rome.
- The Roman Cultural Revolution
- The Colometry of Latin Prose
