= Ansault pear =

Extinct cultivar of pear

Ansault pear is an extinct cultivar pear historically grown in France and the United States. The pear is now used as an example of culinary extinction and the relationship between people and food production.

The flavor of the pear was described as being high quality with buttery and sweet flavor with a delicate scent. The fruit's appearance was dull with green ripening to yellow color with an irregular shape. The shape is partly attributed to the pear not being used in commercial growth so other pear varieties became more common, including the Bartlett, Bosc, and Anjou varieties of pears.

It went extinct during the early 20th century.
