= Arkady Martine =

American science fiction writer (born 1985)

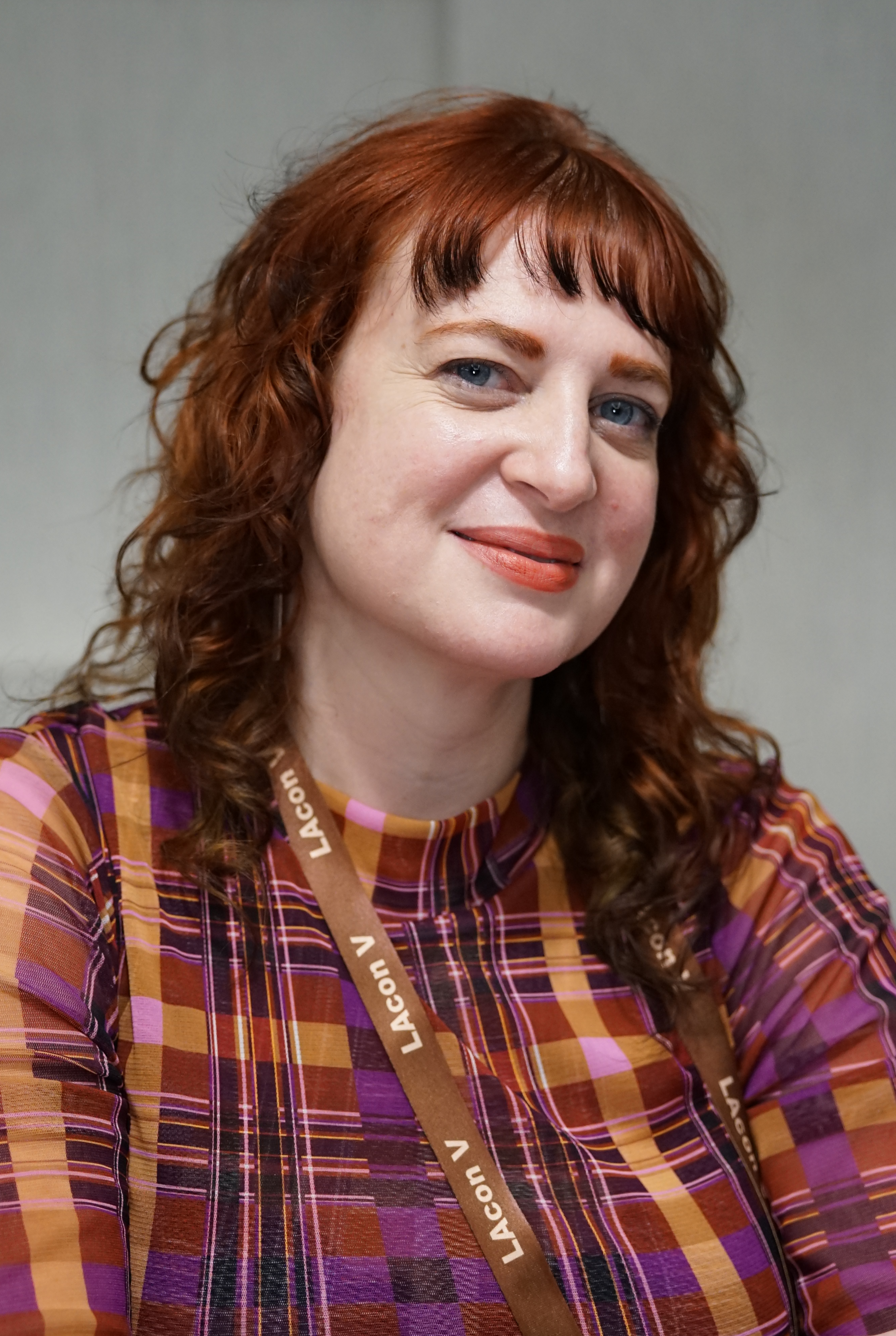
- Weller at 2026 Worldcon
- Born: April 19, 1985 (age 41); New York City, U.S.
- Education: University of Chicago (BA); University of Oxford (MSt); Rutgers University (PhD)
- Occupations: Author, historian
- Spouse: Vivian Shaw
- Writing career
- Pen name: Arkady Martine
- Genre: Speculative fiction
- Notable awards: Hugo Award; Locus Award
- Website: www.arkadymartine.net

AnnaLinden Weller (born April 19, 1985), better known under the pen name Arkady Martine (Ar-KAYdee MarTEEN), is an American author of science fiction literature. Her first novels, A Memory Called Empire (2019) and A Desolation Called Peace (2021), each of which won the Hugo Award for Best Novel, form the Teixcalaan series.

== Early and personal life ==
Weller was born and grew up in New York City. Her parents are classical musicians of Russian Jewish heritage: her mother is a professor of violin at the Juilliard School, and her father played for the orchestra of the Metropolitan Opera. She has described herself as an "assimilated American Jew" and noted that, in the 1930s, Jews who moved to the United States from Europe "were basically playing classical music and inventing the Anglophone discipline of science fiction at the same time".

Weller lives in Santa Fe, New Mexico with her wife, author Vivian Shaw.

== Academic career ==
Weller obtained a Bachelor of Arts in religious studies from the University of Chicago in 2007; a Master of Studies in classical Armenian studies from the University of Oxford in 2013; and a Ph.D. in medieval Byzantine, global, and comparative history from Rutgers University in 2014. Her dissertation was titled "Imagining Pre-Modern Empire: Byzantine Imperial Agents Outside the Metropole". She was a visiting assistant professor of history at St. Thomas University from 2014 to 2015, and she was a postdoctoral researcher at Uppsala University from 2015 to 2017. She has published works on the topic of Byzantine and medieval Armenian history.

== Fiction writing ==
Writing as Arkady Martine, Weller has been publishing science fiction since 2012. She has written that C. J. Cherryh is the author who has most strongly influenced her SF writing: "C. J. Cherryh is how I learned to write politics."

=== A Memory Called Empire ===
Martine's first novel, A Memory Called Empire (2019), begins her Teixcalaan series. The novel is set in a future where the Teixcalaanli empire governs most of human space, and it is about to absorb Lsel (apparently from Armenian lsel, 'listen'), an independent mining station. The Lsel ambassador Mahit Dzmare is sent to the imperial capital to prevent this absorption, and she finds herself embroiled in the empire's succession crisis. Martine said that the book was in many respects a fictional version of her postdoctoral research about Byzantine imperialism on the frontier with Armenia in the 11th century, particularly the annexation of the Kingdom of Ani.

On The Verge website, Andrew Liptak praised the novel as a "brilliant blend of cyberpunk, space opera, and political thriller", highlighting Martine's characterization and worldbuilding. In Locus magazine, Russell Letson appreciated the novel's "absorbing and sometimes challenging blend of intrigue and anthropological imagination", as well as its sense of humor. Publishers Weekly and Kirkus Reviews magazines both gave the novel a starred review, noting the facility with which Martine brought the worlds of her "gorgeously crafted diplomatic space opera" to life, and comparing Martine's novel to the fiction of Ann Leckie and Yoon Ha Lee.

=== A Desolation Called Peace ===
The second novel in the Teixcalaan series, A Desolation Called Peace was first published in 2021. It picks up several months after the events in A Memory Called Empire. Mahit has returned to Lsel station; Three Seagrass has received a promotion, but she is bored on Teixcalaan; and the new emperor has assumed the throne. Mahit is trying to process the events in the previous novel, when she is suddenly thrown into a series of political intrigues; these intrigues compel her to leave Lsel Station alongside Three Seagrass, who arrives at the station to escort Mahit to a remote region of space. Their mission is to attempt to communicate with a species of incomprehensible aliens to prevent a catastrophic war. Meanwhile, on Teixcalaan, political schemes are brewing, and the young heir to the imperial throne plays a central role.

== Awards and nominations ==
Awards and honors
Year	Work	Award	Category	Result	Ref.
2019	"The Hydraulic Emperor"	WSFA Small Press Award	—	Finalist	
2019	A Memory Called Empire	Dragon Award	Science Fiction Novel	Nominated	
2019	A Memory Called Empire	Nebula Award	Novel	Finalist	
2020	A Memory Called Empire	Arthur C. Clarke Award	—	Shortlisted	
2020	A Memory Called Empire	Compton Crook Award	—	Won	
2020	A Memory Called Empire	Hugo Award	Novel	Won	
2020	A Memory Called Empire	Locus Award	First Novel	Finalist	
2021	A Desolation Called Peace	BSFA Award	Novel	Finalist	
2021	A Desolation Called Peace	Dragon Award	Best Science Fiction Novel	Nominated	
2021	A Desolation Called Peace	Nebula Award	Novel	Finalist	
2022	A Desolation Called Peace	Arthur C. Clarke Award	—	Shortlisted	
2022	A Desolation Called Peace	Hugo Award	Novel	Won	
2022	A Desolation Called Peace	Lambda Literary Award	Speculative Fiction	Finalist	
2022	A Desolation Called Peace	Locus Award	Science Fiction Novel	Won	
2024	Rose/House	Hugo Award	Novella	Finalist	
2024	Rose/House	Locus Award	Novella	Finalist	
2024	"Three Faces of a Beheading"	Shirley Jackson Award	Short Fiction	Won	
2025	"Three Faces of a Beheading"	Hugo Award	Short Story	Finalist	
2025	"Three Faces of a Beheading"	Locus Award	Short Story	Finalist	

== Works ==
=== Teixcalaan series ===
- —— (2019). A Memory Called Empire. Tor Books. ISBN 9781250186430.
- —— (2021). A Desolation Called Peace. Tor Books. ISBN 9781250186461.

=== Short fiction ===
==== Novella ====
- —— (2023). Rose/House. Subterranean Press. ISBN 9781645240341.

==== Short stories ====
- "Lace Downstairs" (2012)
- "Nothing Must Be Wasted" (2014)
- "Adjuva" (2015)
- "City of Salt" (2015)
- "When the Fall Is All That's Left" (2015)
- "How the God Auzh-Aravik Brought Order to the World Outside the World" (2016)
- "'Contra Gravitatem (Vita Genevievis)'" (2016)
- "All the Colors You Thought Were Kings" (2016)
- "Ekphrasis" (2016)
- "Ruin Marble" (2017)
- "The Hydraulic Emperor" (2018)
- "Object-Oriented" (2018)
- "Just a Fire" (as by A. Martine) (2018)
- "Faux Ami" (as by A. Martine) (2019)
- "Labbatu Takes Command of the Flagship Heaven Dwells Within" (2019)
- "Life and a Day" (as by A. Martine) (2019)
- "A Desolation Called Peace" (excerpt) (2020)
- "A Being Together Amongst Strangers" (2020)
- "Three Faces of a Beheading", Uncanny Magazine (2024)

=== Poetry ===
- "Cloud Wall" (2014)
- "Abandon Normal Instruments" (2016)

=== Nonfiction ===
- "Everyone's World Is Ending All the Time: Notes on Becoming a Climate Resilience Planner at the Edge of the Anthropocene" (2019)

=== Reviews ===
- "Testament by Hal Duncan" (2015)
- "Report from Planet Midnight by Nalo Hopkinson" (2016)
- "The Djinn Falls in Love & Other Stories by Mahvesh Murad and Jared Shurin" (2017)
- "The Only Harmless Great Thing by Brooke Bolander" (2018)
