= Kathi Appelt =

American writer

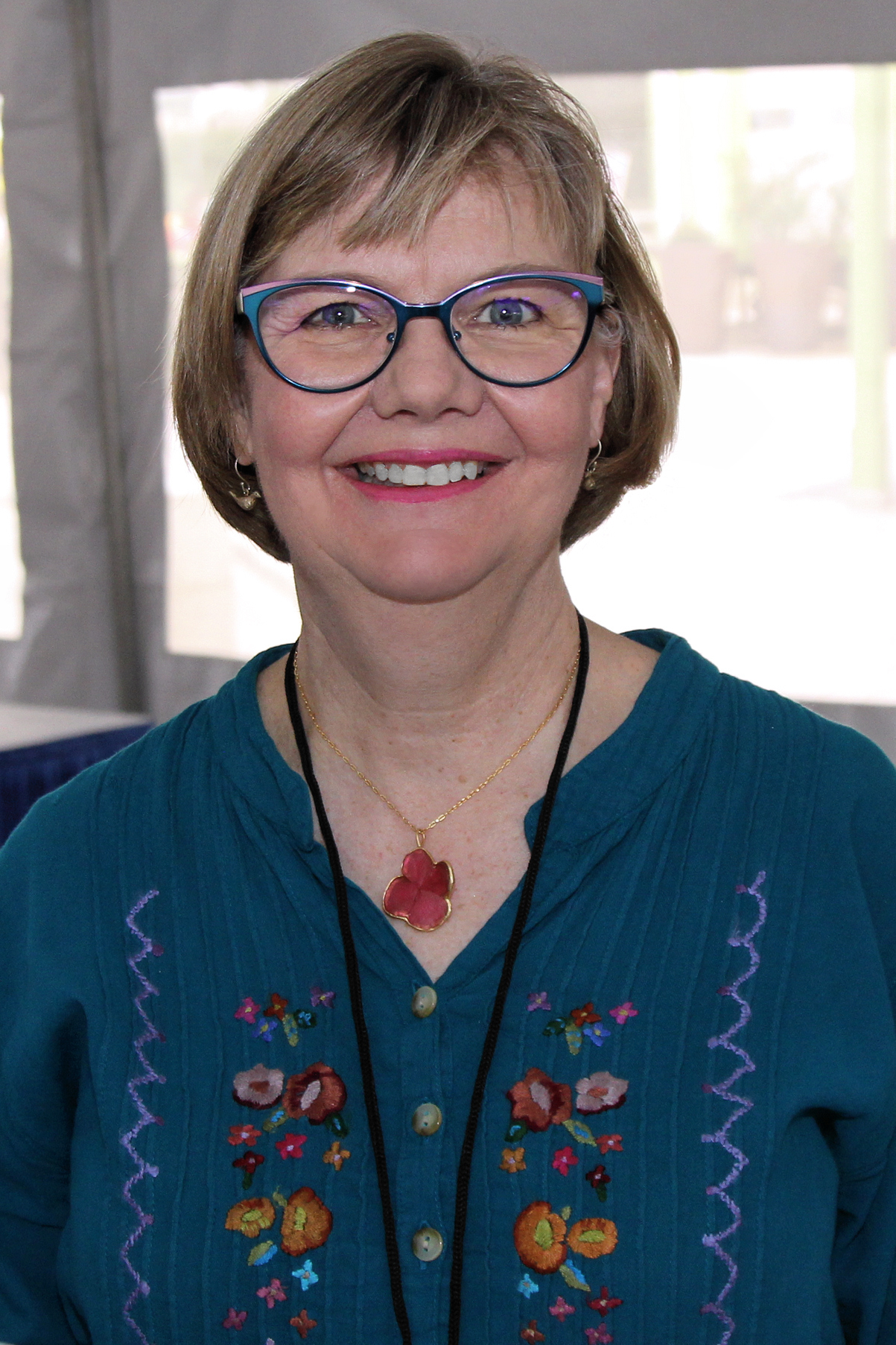
- Appelt at the 2017 Texas Book Festival
- Born: July 6, 1954 (age 72); Fayetteville, North Carolina, U.S.
- Education: Texas A&M University
- Occupations: Writer, writing teacher
- Writing career
- Period: 1990s–present
- Genres: Children's literature, picture books, non-fiction
- Website: kathiappelt.com

Kathi Appelt (born July 6, 1954) is an American author of more than forty books for children and young adults. She won the annual PEN USA award for Children's Literature recognizing The Underneath (2008).

== Biography ==
Kathi Appelt was born in Fayetteville, North Carolina, and grew up in Houston, Texas. She graduated from Texas A&M University and lives in College Station, Texas.

Appelt is the author of more than 30 books. She writes novels, picture books, poetry, and nonfiction for children and young adults. Her books have been translated into several languages: Spanish, Chinese, French, and Swedish. She is emerita faculty at the Vermont College of Fine Arts MFA in Writing for Children and Young Adults program.

Her first novel was The Underneath, illustrated by David Small and published by Simon & Schuster in 2008. It features a cat and dog who live mainly beneath an old house in the Louisiana–Texas bayou. For that work she received the annual Children's Literature award from PEN Center USA and she was also a runner-up for the National Book Award (National Book Award for Young People's Literature finalist) and the American Library Association Newbery Medal (Newbery Honor Book).

Her papers are held in the de Grummond Children's Literature Collection at the University of Southern Mississippi (unprocessed manuscripts collection, 1985–2005).

== Selected works ==
- Someone’s Come to Our House, illustrated by Nancy Carpenter (Eerdmans, 1999)
- The Alley Cat's Meow, illustrated by Jon Goodell (Harcourt, 2002)
- Poems from Homeroom: A Writer's Place to Start (Henry Holt and Co., 2002)
- The Underneath, illustrated by David Small (Simon & Schuster, 2008)
- Brand-New Baby Blues, illustrated by Kelly Murphy (HarperCollins, 2009)
- Keeper, illus. August Hall (Atheneum Books, 2010)
- The True Blue Scouts of Sugar Man Swamp (Atheneum Books for Young Readers, 2013)
- Maybe a Fox, illus. Alison McGee (Atheneum/Caitlyn Dlouhy Books, 2016)
- Down Cut Shin Creek: The Pack Horse Librarians of Kentucky, co-authored by Jeanne Cannella Schmitzer (HarperCollins, 2001; Purple House Press 2019)
- Max Attacks, illus. Penelope Dullaghan (Atheneum Books for Young Readers, 2019)
- Angel Thieves (Atheneum/Caitlyn Dlouhy Books, 2019)
