= Zealot: A Book About Cults =

2019 non-fiction book by Jo Thornely

- Author: Jo Thornely
- Publisher: Hachette Australia
- Publication date: 26 February 2019
- Publication place: Australia
- Pages: 292
- ISBN: 9780733640506
- Dewey Decimal: 299.93

Zealot: A Book About Cults is a 2019 non-fiction book by Australian writer and podcaster Jo Thornely. The book addresses and describes high-profile religious cults such as Aum Shinrikyo, the Peoples Temple, and Heaven's Gate in an irreverent comedic style.

== Background ==
Thornely first started writing and speaking on cults in 1985, as a spur-of-the-moment decision after needing a subject for a talk. She would later become the host of the podcast Zealot in 2017, which lent the book its name. She describes cults as the "juiciest" type of true crime story, with the book being written in a conversational, even jovial style. Zealot: A Book About Cults was published 26 February 2019 by Hachette Australia.

== Synopsis ==
The book opens with a discussion of the definition of cults and the reasons people join them, conceptualised as finding their current lifestyles unsatisfactory: "it’s too restrictive, it’s not restrictive or pious enough, it doesn’t seem to offer solutions for a chaotic and dangerous world, it doesn’t let them have enough sex with aliens". It describes typical beliefs of cults as a mash-up of "Eastern mysticism, the Christian Bible, the imminent apocalypse, aliens in UFOs and rampant, unbridled horniness". The book discusses internationally known groups such as the Peoples Temple run by Jim Jones, as well as some known primarily in Australia, such as The Family. The last chapter, written in a more serious register, suggests questions that may help readers decide if they themselves are in a cult.

== Reception ==
Zealot: A Book About Cults received generally positive reviews. Writing for The Australian, David Free described Thornely as "a piss-taker of rare boldness" and an important deconstruction of cults, using humour as a tool to attack their foundations. Thomas Van Essen at Backstory Journal praised the book as "a sullen reminder of why sometimes good people do very bad things", but found the sarcastic sense of humour held the potential for offence. Other positive reviews were published at The Clothesline and the publishing division of ArtsHub Australia.

In addition to general audience reception, a scholarly review was published in the academic journal Psychiatry, Psychology and Law by Ian Freckelton. Commenting that Zealot "has no pretensions towards being learned or scholarly", Freckelton nonetheless lauded the book as a high-quality treatise on the topic appropriate for both general and specialist audiences. He was particularly predisposed to the book's usefulness to attorneys or psychologists with clients in or at risk of joining cults, and recommended they recommend the book to such clients.

== See also ==
- Cults
- New religious movements and cults in popular culture
