= Mental Health Royal Commission =

2019–2021 royal commission in Victoria, Australia

Royal Commission into Victoria's Mental Health System
- Location: Victoria, Australia
- Also known as: Mental Health Royal Commission
- Commissioners: Penny Armytage AM (chair); Allan Fels AO; Alexandra Cockram; Bernadette McSherry
- Inquiry period: 22 February 2019 – 3 February 2021
- Constituting instrument: Inquiries Act 2014 (Vic)
- Website: rcvmhs.vic.gov.au

The Royal Commission into Victoria's Mental Health System, more widely known as the Mental Health Royal Commission, is a royal commission in Victoria, Australia. It was established on 22 February 2019 to investigate deficiencies in the state's mental health system and the broader prevalence of mental illnesses and suicides in the state. The commission published and delivered its interim report to the Governor on 27 November 2019 and tabled in Parliament on the same day. The Commission delivered its final report on 3 February 2021 and it was tabled on 2 March 2021 during a special sitting of the Legislative Assembly at the Royal Exhibition Building in Melbourne.

== Establishment and process of the Royal Commission ==
During the 2018 state election Labor Premier Daniel Andrews promised that a re-elected government would establish a royal commission to inquire into a "broken" mental health system.

On 22 February 2019 the Governor of Victoria issued the letters patent, appointing Ms Penny Armytage to Chair the Royal Commission, supported by former Australian Competition and Consumer Commission chief and carer of someone with a mental health issue, Allan Fels; psychiatrist and Associate Professor of the University of Melbourne's Department of Psychiatry, Alex Cockram; Professor of law specialising in mental health law and criminal law, Professor Bernadette McSherry. The peak body for people with lived experience, the Victorian Mental Illness Awareness Council, expressed concern that absent the appointed commissioners was someone with lived experience of using the mental health system.

In 11 weeks between 17 April 2019 and 15 July 2019, the Royal Commission called for submissions from the public, receiving 3 267 responses. An interim report was released, making nine interim recommendations. In May 2020 the Victorian Government confirmed providing an extension to the Royal Commission to complete its work until February 2021, noting the delays caused by the COVID-19 pandemic. Further witness statements were received throughout 2020, as well as 8 community panel hearings. Commissioners deliberated in the final stages of 2020 before the final report was delivered to the Victorian Government on 1 February 2021. The final report was released to the public in a special sitting of the Victorian Parliament on 2 March 2021, with significant media coverage and attention.

== Findings ==
Among the themes from the Royal Commission's findings were that:

- demand had overtaken capacity within the system, with under-investment being a significant cause
- there was an over-reliance on bed-based care, with an under-investment in community-based services
- care was often too medicalised, meaning therapeutic and lived experience-led approaches were under-utilised
- the system was difficult to navigate, limiting people's opportunities to direct their own care
- mental health services routinely breached people's human rights through the use of seclusion and restraint, and by failing to comply with duties under mental health legislation
- the system had routinely overlooked the perspectives of people with lived experience, including consumers, peer workers and peer groups that have developed alternatives to the current system
- families, carers and supporters routinely had their needs ignored by a system, having impacts on their lives
- trauma was not addressed by the system, and the use of coercion and the failure to provide holistic care were themselves a cause of trauma
- services were often not equitably or responsively provided to people outside mainstream communities, meaning culturally and linguistically diverse, LGBTIQ+, disabled and other communities often received less access or worse standards of care
- mainstream services were not culturally safe to Aboriginal Victorians, compounding disadvantage already caused by colonisation and government policies.

These findings informed the development of a suite of recommendations in the Interim and Final Report.

== Recommendations ==
The Royal Commission's final report includes 65 recommendations in addition to the nine interim report recommendations.

The recommendations set out a 10-year vision for a future mental health system in Victoria where people can access treatment close to their homes and in their communities. Importantly, people with lived experience of mental illness or psychological distress will be central to the design and delivery of this new mental health and wellbeing system being implemented as a result of this Royal Commission.

The Royal Commission's recommendations are grouped around four key features of the future mental health and wellbeing system:

1) A responsive and integrated system with community at its heart.

2) A system attuned to promoting inclusion and addressing inequities.

3) Re-established public confidence through prioritisation and collaboration.

4) Contemporary and adaptable services.

The Government of Victoria has committed to implementing all recommendations, establishing Mental Health Reform Victoria for this purpose. In July 2021, its staff and functions moved to the new Mental Health and Wellbeing Division within the Department of Health (Victoria).

The 2021–22 Victorian State Budget responded to the recommendations of the Royal Commission into Victoria's Mental Health System, with the Victorian Government announcing a record $3.8 billion investment in mental health and wellbeing.

Among the recommendations was the development of a new Lived Experience Agency to support innovation in the mental health sector.

== A new Mental Health and Wellbeing Act for Victoria ==
The Royal Commission found that implementation of the Mental Health Act 2014 (Vic) had not lived up to expectation. Originally, that legislation was lauded as making Victoria a "leader" in mental health reform in Australia. The Royal Commission's interim report concluded that the least restrictive means possible were not being used by mental health services. The final report found that because mental health services do not routinely record whether and how they seek informed consent to treatment, it is 'unclear to what extent authorised psychiatrists consider these provisions before administering treatment.'

Other issues identified in the final report were regarding quality and safety as well as oversight processes to give effect to legal obligations. The final report spoke to evidence that:

'it is difficult to see what actions are being taken to hold services to account for quality and safety or human rights failings. Transparency about these activities allows consumers and their advocates to engage in a more meaningful way with the various oversight and improvement arrangements, and hold those charged with these functions to—in turn—be held to account. In contrast, the lack of information about how the Department of Health, the Chief Psychiatrist and other bodies are responding to quality and safety concerns can leave consumers feeling disempowered and distrustful.'

As part of its recommendations, the Royal Commission recommended the repeal of the current Mental Health Act 2014 and enactment of a new Mental Health and Wellbeing Act for the state of Victoria.

This new Act aimed to:

- promote good mental health and wellbeing for all people in Victoria
- reset the legislative foundations for the mental health and wellbeing system
- support the delivery of services that are responsive to the needs and preferences of Victorians
- put the views, preferences and values of people living with mental illness or psychological distress, families, carers and supporters at the forefront of service design and delivery.

The Royal Commission has recommended that the new Mental Health and Wellbeing Act be passed no later than mid-2022.

The Department of Health ran public engagement to help with the drafting of the Mental Health and Wellbeing Bill from June to August 2021. The department will work with consumers, families, carers, supporters, workers and providers to develop guidelines, regulations and processes to support the new Act once it has been passed by the Victorian Parliament. The new Act also provided for the replacement of the previous Mental Health Complaints Commissioner that had been criticised for under-enforcement of human rights. However, the new Mental Health and Wellbeing Commission has also been criticised for similar issues and for a lack of transparency.

== 2024–2025 Budget Commitments and the Royal Commission Recommendations ==
In the 2024–2025 budget, the Victorian Government committed to key elements associated with the Royal Commission recommendations, while highlighting questions about others. The Victorian Government continued to provide funding for youth mental health services, such as those provided by Orygen Youth Mental Health. However, the following recommendations have now remained behind the schedule provided by the Royal Commission:

- Recommendations 1 and 49 – providing for a new outcomes and performance framework to drive the overall systems management, due by the end of 2022.
- Recommendations 3 – the rollout of Local Adult and Older Mental Health and Wellbeing Services remain behind the schedule set out by the Royal Commission, with delays imposed in the 2024–2025 budget.
- Recommendation 4 – references to the government's commitments to establish Regional Mental Health and Wellbeing Boards has been removed from public websites, despite earlier websites containing these commitments. Regional Boards had the role of co-commissioning (purchasing) services based on local community needs, and with the ongoing leadership of people with lived experience. Regional Boards have been written into the Mental Health and Wellbeing Act 2022 (Vic), due to begin work by 31 December 2024, and will require an Act of Parliament to remove them.
- Recommendation 10 – after delays, the Victorian Government is behind schedule for work to commence a health-based response for people in mental health crisis. This is in response to concerns about police-based responses.
- Recommendation 29 – the Victorian Government did not provide funding for a Lived Experience Agency to drive innovation and change across the system. A campaign run by multiple lived experience organisations designated this "Our Agency". This was due by the end of 2022.

Timeframes for these recommendations is indicated in Volume 5 of the Royal Commission reports. Three weeks after the release of the budget, the Mental Health and Wellbeing Commission released a statement acknowledging the disappointment in the rollout of the Royal Commission recommendations. In August 2024, the Mental Health and Wellbeing Commission, with the statutory functions to monitor the government's implementation of the Royal Commission recommendations and powers to conduct own-motion inquiries, stated it was still seeking further information and briefings from government.

== References and further reading ==
- Royal Commission into Victoria's Mental Health System (3 February 2021). Final Report (Report).
- Royal Commission into Victoria's Mental Health System (27 November 2019). Interim Report (Report).
- Bennett, James; Rizmal, Zalika (28 July 2019). "What to expect as Victoria's mental health royal commission wraps up". ABC News. Australian Broadcasting Corporation. (more reference material at bottom of article)
- Hall, Bianca (16 January 2019). "Mental health royal commission overwhelmed by response". The Age. (refers to consultation process prior to royal commission being established)
- Ilanbey, Sumeyya; Cunningham, Melissa; Perkins, Miki (28 November 2019). "'Catastrophically failed' Victorians set to pay special tax to fund mental health". The Age.
- Perkins, Miki (28 November 2019). "Mental health commission's report offers Victorians a glimmer of hope". The Age.
- Ilanbey, Sumeyya (29 November 2019). "Labor and opposition split on mental health funding". The Age.
- Martin, Lisa (2 July 2019). "'What suicidal looks like': Wayne Schwass tells of pain of hiding mental health problems". The Guardian.
- Davey, Melissa (28 November 2019). "Victoria to introduce mental health tax after royal commission finds it 'woefully unprepared'". The Guardian.
