= Mr Gumpy's Outing =

Book by John Burningham

- Author: John Burningham
- Publication date: 1970
- ISBN: 080503854X

Mr Gumpy's Outing is a children's picture book written and illustrated by John Burningham and published by Jonathan Cape in 1970. According to library catalogue summaries, "All the animals went for a boat ride with Mr Gumpy. Then the boat got too heavy ..."; "Mr Gumpy accepts more and more riders on his boat until the inevitable occurs." Burningham won the annual Kate Greenaway Medal from the Library Association, recognising the year's best children's book illustration by a British subject, and the Boston Globe–Horn Book Award, a similar award by a magazine for a picture books published in the United States.

Beside the Greenaway Medal, Mr Gumpy's Outing won the 1972 Boston Globe–Horn Book Award for Picture Book (U.S.) and some honor from the Biennial of Illustration Bratislava. It also made several annual booklists.

Holt, Rinehart and Winston published a U.S. edition in October 1971 (32pp, ISBN 080503854X).

According to Kirkus Reviews, "Burningham's sketchy yellow lines make the sun shine on his pages, and his animals — sometimes jaunty, more often appealingly hesitant — are his alone, unostentatiously distinctive. Mr. Gumpy has the bumbling charm of an English Mr Hulot and his outing is an unqualified pleasure."
