= Jack Fairweather (writer) =

British journalist and author

Jack Fairweather (born in 1978), is a British journalist and author.

== Early life ==
Fairweather was born in Shrewsbury, England in 1978. He was brought up in the village of Abermule, Powys, Wales and attended Abermule Primary School and Newtown High School. His sister, Chloé Fairweather, directed Dying to Divorce, a film selected as the British entry for the Best International Feature Film at the 94th Academy Awards in 2021. He was educated at Atlantic College, and at Lincoln College at the University of Oxford.

== Career ==
Fairweather was a freelance correspondent embedded with British troops during the 2003 invasion of Iraq. He was a stringer for The Daily Telegraph in Baghdad, where he met his wife Christina Asquith, a journalist working on contract to cover education issues in Iraq for New York Times. Fairweather claims he survived an attempted kidnapping and an attempted suicide bombing in Iraq.

He later contributed freelance articles from Afghanistan to the PostGlobal blog hosted by The Washington Post. His war coverage has won a British Press Award and an Overseas Press Club award citation.

His book The Volunteer, a biography about Witold Pilecki, a Polish resistance fighter who infiltrated Auschwitz during the Holocaust and Second World War, won the 2019 Costa Book Award. "Witold Pilecki is a man whose footsteps I was following for 5 years. He is an extraordinary human being who exposed himself to the worst danger in Auschwitz and he risked his life in so many ways to report what was happening in Auschwitz. He made up a group of people who smuggled news to get them out from the camp"

== Books ==
- A War of Choice: the British in Iraq 2003-9 (Vintage, 2012)
- The Good War: Why We Couldn’t Win the War or the Peace in Afghanistan, by Jack Fairweather, (Basic Books, 2014)
- The Volunteer: One Man's Mission to Lead an Underground Army Inside Auschwitz and Stop the Holocaust (Custom House, 2019)
- A Rebel in Auschwitz: The True Story of the Resistance Hero who Fought the Nazis From Inside the Camp (Scholastic Focus, 2021)
- "The Prosecutor: One Man's Battle to Bring Nazis to Justice" (Penguin Random House, 2025)

== Awards ==
The Good War was a finalist for the 2015 Lionel Gelber Prize.

The Volunteer won the Costa Book of the Year Award 2019.
