= The Volunteer (book) =

2019 book by Jack Fairweather about Witold Pilecki

The Volunteer: The True Story of the Resistance Hero Who Infiltrated Auschwitz
- First edition (UK)
- Author: Jack Fairweather
- Publisher: W. H. Allen & Co. (UK); Custom House (US)
- Publication date: 2019
- Publication place: United Kingdom
- Media type: Print (Hardcover)
- Pages: 528
- ISBN: 0-06256-141-3
- Text: The Volunteer: The True Story of the Resistance Hero Who Infiltrated Auschwitz at Google Books

The Volunteer: The True Story of the Resistance Hero Who Infiltrated Auschwitz (British title; the American edition is titled The Volunteer: One Man's Mission to Lead an Underground Army Inside Auschwitz and Stop the Holocaust) is a 2019 book which presents research by British writer Jack Fairweather, a former Washington Post war correspondent, into the life of Witold Pilecki, a Polish soldier and Home Army resistance fighter who infiltrated the infamous Auschwitz concentration camp. The book was met with positive reception from critics and won the Costa Book Awards – Book of the Year prize that year.

== Historical background ==
Pilecki was a 38-year-old landowner and cavalry captain (rotmistrz) in the Polish Armed Forces reserves when Germany invaded Poland on 1 September 1939. When the country was overrun by the Germans and the Soviets, he joined the Polish underground army. In summer 1940, the underground began to hear reports about a concentration camp in the former Austrian, and later Polish, army barracks at Oświęcim. The underground, Fairweather writes, decided to send a volunteer to "infiltrate the camp, gain intelligence, and, if possible, raise a resistance cell and stage a breakout." In September 1940 Pilecki volunteered for the mission, got himself arrested under an assumed name, and was sent to Auschwitz concentration camp, as prisoner 4859. He remained there for two years and nine months. Following his escape and filing of a detailed report for the Home Army and Allies on German human experiments and systematic killings in the camp, Pilecki resumed his resistance activities and, against orders, joined the Warsaw Uprising as a soldier. In 1948 he was tried by Poland's communist government for spying for "the West" and was quickly executed, despite appeals from a number of Auschwitz survivors (directed to, among others, Prime Minister Józef Cyrankiewicz, also an Auschwitz survivor) for his sentence to be commuted.

Pilecki's Report came to light in the 1960s, and his story has been mentioned in some works published in English (beginning with Józef Garliński's Fighting Auschwitz: The Resistance Movement in the Concentration Camp in 1975) but research on this topic was prohibited in Poland. Only after the Soviet Union and the Polish communist regime collapsed in 1989 did the Polish state archives on previously classified topics such as the story of Pilecki become accessible to independent historians, allowing for new research on these topics. Several monographs on Pilecki appeared Poland since the 1990s, and in 2012 Pilecki's diary was translated into English and published under the title The Auschwitz Volunteer: Beyond Bravery.

== Development ==
Fairweather learned about Pilecki in 2011 which inspired him to write a monograph on the topic, which he finished in 2019. The book was published in 2019. The British edition is titled The Volunteer: The True Story of the Resistance Hero Who Infiltrated Auschwitz and the US edition The Volunteer: One Man's Mission to Lead an Underground Army Inside Auschwitz and Stop the Holocaust.

== Reception ==
=== Popular press ===
The book met with positive reception from critics. With regards to popular press, The Guardian reviewer, P.D. Smith, calls it a "compelling study of [Pilecki's] remarkable life" and concludes that the main protagonist of the book "did more than anyone to reveal the true horror of the camp". Also in The Guardian, critic Andrew Anthony notes that the book "explores the limits of humanity" and is "an impressive feat of research, organised by a keen moral intelligence and written with the elegance and pace of a first-rate thriller." Anne de Courcy, writing for The Telegraph, gave the book 5 stars out of 5 and described it as "extraordinary" while Sebastian Junger wrote that the book is "superbly written" and "breathtakingly researched". The Economist concluded that "Pilecki is perhaps one of the greatest unsung heroes of the Second World War" and that "this insightful book is likely to be the definitive version of this extraordinary life." Neal Bascomb reviewing the work for The Wall Street Journal called the book "superb" and Caroline Moorehead, a reviewer for The Spectator, "gripping ".

The book was also reviewed by Maria Suchcitz for New Eastern Europe who called the author's research "meticulous" and notes that "Fairweather succeeds in presenting an extremely detailed and sobering account of Pilecki’s two and a half years at Auschwitz". Bishop Sally Dyck writing for The Christian Century magazine, noted that the book is "a study in the kind of courage it takes to resist injustice", and a helpful addition to the canon of works discussing the topic of the fate "of ethnic Poles in World War II" in the context of Auschwitz, generally dominated by the focus of Jewish Holocaust to the point that many people are not aware Auschwitz prisoners included non-Jews as well. In the Polish American Journal, Leonard Kniffel called the book "Meticulously researched and superbly written".

=== Academia ===
The book has also received a number of academic reviews. The book was reviewed by historian Adam Cyra for Memoria, a publication of the Auchwitz Museum. Cyra, one of the historians whom Fairweather consulted during his research, writes that "It is very difficult to find any factual errors in the masterfully written biography of the Auschwitz volunteer", though he does find a few, such as Fairweather's claim that Stanisław Gustaw Jaster was tried by the Home Army's Special Courts, or Fairweather's description of Pilecki's 1947 arrest, circumstances of which historians still consider to be unknown – hence Cyra refers to this scene in the book as "literary fiction". Despite the book's narrative style, Cyra argues that the book "should be considered as non-fiction literature"; that it is "only partly fictionalized"; and that the prose is supported by extensive footnotes, photographs, documents, plans, and diagrams; and he concludes that the book "was written from the viewpoint of a researcher from outside Polish cultural circles, and therefore it is all the more valuable".

Sociologist Piotr Konieczny reviewed the book for European History Quarterly. He wrote that "a few minor errors aside, the book seems generally well researched and factually correct... The story of the person who possibly volunteered and certainly did infiltrate one of the most dangerous locations in the history of mankind. He organized resistance on the inside and survived it, enriched with numerous useful maps and diagrams, copious footnotes, and friendly prose is certainly of interest both to the general public and academia."

Historian Jarek Garliński writing for The Polish Review summarized his opinion of the book as "very readable and informative", likely owing to the author's experience as a journalist. He does however note several weaknesses, such as an occasional "unjustified hyperbole (including in the very title of the US edition, noting that Pilecki's principal mission was to gather information and not the stage an uprising). He also observes that the author missed an opportunity to discuss some interesting if controversial topics in more detail, such as the reasons neither the Western Allies, the Polish underground nor the Soviets attempted to liberate the camp, which he finds jarring as he believes that "at the heart of Pilecki’s story though lies the moral issue of whether or not Auschwitz should have been bombed" or liberated.

According to Steven Minniear, a reviewer for The Journal of Military History, the book "works well" as a biography, it is "exceptional" as "an examination of what it meant to be a Pole imprisoned in Auschwitz", but "has some issues" as when it comes to presenting the wider context of Polish resistance and Allies knowledge and attitude about the camp. The reviewer concludes that the book is interesting to readers interesting in all of the above contexts.

More critical was historian Michael Fleming, who in his review for the Israel Journal of Foreign Affairs, praised the book's, photographs, maps, and prose which he considers accessible but also wrote that the book is a hagiographic narrative that reinforces a myth about Pilecki volunteering to be imprisoned in Auschwitz, whereas Fleming posits that "Pilecki was pressured [in]to allow[ing] himself to be arrested in the hope of being sent to a camp". Fleming concludes that, "Despite the problems outlined..., the book has several merits... and provides some additional insight into courier operations and Pilecki’s peacetime life". On the other spectrum, historian Marek Chodakiewicz, reviewing the book for the Polonia Institute, argued that, also while it keeps Pilecki's memory alive, it is also "an uncomfortable effort to assimilate the hero to the post-modern liberal narrative".

== Awards ==
In 2019, Fairweather won the Costa Book Awards – Book of the Year for The Volunteer.

== See also ==
- Jan Karski
- Irena Sendler
- Cursed soldiers
- Pilecki Institute
