= Max Attacks =

Children's picture book by Kathi Appelt and Penelope Dullaghan

- Front cover, designed by Penelope Dullaghan
- Author: Kathi Appelt
- Illustrator: Penelope Dullaghan
- Cover artist: Dullaghan
- Language: English
- Genre: Children's picture book
- Published: 2019 (Atheneum Books for Young Readers)
- Publication place: USA
- Media type: Print (hardback)
- Pages: 40
- ISBN: 9781481451468
- OCLC: 1103823065

Max Attacks is a 2019 children's picture book written by Kathi Appelt and illustrated by Penelope Dullaghan. It is about a distractible young cat called Max who is obsessed with some fish in a bowl but continually leaves them to pounce on things including socks, shoelaces, and a lizard on a flyscreen but always returns to the bowl. He eventually "pounces" on his food bowl, eats lots, then has a cat nap.

== Reception ==
In a starred review, Kirkus Reviews wrote "Rollicking rhymes and playful language create an admiring third-person narrative that perfectly captures Max’s energy and charm.", commended the text typeface ("The typeface .. adds personality and enhances the humor.") and illustrations ("Textured brush strokes add to the sense of movement, while simply drawn features convey a wealth of emotion ...").

Max Attacks has also been reviewed by Publishers Weekly, Booklist, and the School Library Journal.
