= Civil Eats =

Digital news site

- Website type: News website
- Available in: English
- Creators: Naomi Starkman and Paula Crossfield
- Editor: Naomi Starkman
- Website: civileats.com
- Launched: 2009; 17 years ago

Civil Eats is an independent, nonprofit digital news and commentary site about the American food system. Founded in 2009 by Naomi Starkman and Paula Crossfield, who left the organization in 2014. The site works with more than 150 contributors and covers the United States’ food system, including food policy, sustainable agriculture and food justice.

For its first four years, Civil Eats operated with no funding. It raised an unprecedented $100,000 via Kickstarter in 2013, was named Publication of the Year in 2014 by the James Beard Foundation, inducted into the Library of Congress in 2019, and won the IACP Digital Media Award for Best Group Food Blog in 2020. Editor-in-chief Naomi Starkman was a 2016 John S. Knight Fellow at Stanford University.

Starkman, the publication’s former editor-in-chief, now serves as the executive director. Brian Calvert, the former editor-in-chief for High Country News, is the editorial director for Civil Eats. Calvert also oversees the news team, which includes Senior Staff Reporter and Contributing Editor Lisa Held, Staff Reporter Rebekah Alvey, and Video Reporter Vanessa Johnston.

Margo True, a winner of four James Beard awards and a longtime magazine journalist, is Civil Eats’ features editor. The features team includes Associate Editor Christina Cooke and Associate Editor Tilde Herrera.

Matthew Wheeland, Civil Eats’ former managing editor, is the site’s operations director and a key part of the Civil Eats development team, which includes Development Director Susan Desmond, Membership Manager Kalisha Bass, and Audience Engagement Editor Marisa Martinez.

== See also ==
- Institute for Nonprofit News (member)
- Solutions journalism
