= Idaho (novel) =

2017 novel by Emily Ruskovich

- First edition
- Author: Emily Ruskovich
- Publisher: Random House
- Publication date: January 3, 2017
- ISBN: 0812994043

Idaho is a novel written by Emily Ruskovich and published by Random House on January 3, 2017. The author received the International Dublin Literary Award, for which it was nominated by Bibliotheek Brugge Library.

== Reviews ==
The book has been reviewed by The New York Times and The Guardian.
