= John Burningham =

English children's illustrator and writer (1936–2019)

- Born: 27 April 1936; Farnham, Surrey, England
- Died: 4 January 2019 (aged 82); London, England
- Occupations: Author; illustrator
- Spouse: Helen Oxenbury (m. 1964)
- Website: johnburningham.co.uk

John Burningham (27 April 1936 – 4 January 2019) was an English author and illustrator of picture books for young children. He lived in north London with his wife Helen Oxenbury, another illustrator. His last published work was a husband-and-wife collaboration, There's Going to Be a Baby (Walker Books, September 2010), written by John and illustrated by Helen for "ages 2+".

Burningham won the 1963 and 1970 Kate Greenaway Medals for British children's book illustration. The first was for his debut as illustrator (and author), Borka: The Adventures of a Goose with No Feathers, named one of the top ten winning works for the 50th anniversary of the Medal (1955–2005). His second Greenaway Medal winner, Mr Gumpy's Outing (1970), is his work most widely held in WorldCat participating libraries, and it also won the annual Boston Globe–Horn Book Award (US) in the picture books category.

For his lasting contribution as a children's illustrator, Burningham was one of five or six finalists in 2012 and in 2014 for the biennial, international Hans Christian Andersen Award, the highest recognition available to creators of children's books. He was the UK's national nominee in 1980 and 1986.

== Biography ==
Burningham was born 27 April 1936, in Farnham, Surrey, England, to Charles and Jessie (Mackintosh) Burningham. He was educated at the alternative school Summerhill. Burningham's 1964 children's book "John Burningham's ABC" was dedicated to the founder of Summerhill, A. S. Neill, his old headteacher. The author famously wrote to Neill at the time "I managed to pick up the alphabet upon leaving Summerhill". When called up for National Service he registered as a conscientious objector, and served in forestry and housing projects. He entered the Central School of Art when he was 20 and graduated in 1959. After work on posters (for London and British Transport) and animated films, Burningham debuted both as book author and book illustrator in 1963 with the picture book Borka: The Adventures of a Goose With No Feathers, published by Jonathan Cape. For that he won the 1963 Kate Greenaway Medal from the Library Association, recognising the year's best children's book illustration by a British subject. For the 50th anniversary of the Medal (1955–2005), a panel of experts named Borka one of the top ten winning works, which composed the ballot for a public election of the nation's favourite.

Cape was soon looking for someone to illustrate a forthcoming children's adventure serial called Chitty-Chitty-Bang-Bang that was written by Ian Fleming, its most successful author at the time. Fleming had suggested cartoonist "Trog" (Wally Fawkes) of the Daily Mail, but the newspaper would not allow the illustrator of their popular Flook strip to work for an author whose James Bond stories were adapted as a comic strip for its arch-rival Daily Express. Fleming consulted his motor engineer friend Charles Amherst Villiers, who produced a sketch based on Fleming's description of the magical car—this drawing was passed to Cape's popular new illustrator John Burningham, who was asked to illustrate the whole series on the strength of his debut story Borka. Chitty-Chitty-Bang-Bang was originally published in three volumes, 1964–1965; the omnibus edition followed in 1968. Burningham's witty and timeless art-work, along with Fleming's imaginative text, led Chitty to become the most famous and best loved car in English-language fiction.

In 1964, Burningham married author-illustrator Helen Oxenbury, who won the 1969 Greenaway Medal. He won the next year for Mr Gumpy's Outing (Cape, 1970), the first illustrator to win twice. Oxenbury was later a highly commended runner up four times, and eventually won a second Medal of her own for an edition of Alice in Wonderland (Walker, 1999) that was also named to the anniversary top ten.

Burningham has contributed to more than 60 other books and has received many awards including the 1980 Deutscher Jugendliteraturpreis, Picture book category, for Was ist dir lieber ... (ISBN 3-7941-5094-5), the German-language edition of Would you rather ... (Cape, 1978, ISBN 0-224-01635-0). Google books calls it 'A series of comical choices such as, "Would you rather eat spider stew or slug dumplings or mashed worms?"'

For both writing and illustrating Granpa (1984), he won the "Emil": the Kurt Maschler Award, annually (1982 to 1999) recognising one UK-published "work of imagination for children, in which text and illustration are integrated so that each enhances and balances the other." It was adapted as a 1989 animated film of the same name.

In 2012 Burningham was one of five finalists for the biennial international Hans Christian Andersen Award for Illustration, which recognises a living "illustrator whose complete works have made lasting contributions to children's literature." Thirty national sections of the International Board on Books for Young People had exercised the option to nominate someone. The jury summarised, "John Burningham from the UK uses delicate irony mixed with innocence and high seriousness that with his use of line and colour, creates an intimacy with the reader."

Burningham died in London on 4 January 2019, at the age of 82, after contracting pneumonia.

== Selected works ==
Burningham both wrote and illustrated almost all of his published books. The exceptions are listed here:

- Borka: The Adventures of a Goose with No Feathers (Jonathan Cape, 1963)
- ABC (Cape, 1964); also John Burningham's ABC
- Chitty-Chitty-Bang-Bang: The Magical Car by Ian Fleming (Cape, three vols. October 1964 to January 1965)
- The Extraordinary Tug-of-war retold by Letta Schatz (Follett, 1968)
- Seasons (Cape, 1969)
- Mr Gumpy's Outing (Cape, 1970)
- Around the World in Eighty Days (Cape, 1972)
- Mr Gumpy's Motor Car (Cape, 1973)
- Come Away from the Water, Shirley (Cape, 1977)
- Time to Get Out of the Bath, Shirley (Cape, 1978)
- The Wind in the Willows by Kenneth Grahame (Kestrel, 1983)—an edition of the 1908 classic
- Granpa (Cape, 1984)
- Where's Julius? (Cape, 1986)
- There's Going to Be a Baby (Walker Books, 2010), illustrated by Helen Oxenbury—husband and wife, their first collaboration

== Works about Burningham ==
- John Burningham, John Burningham (2009)
- D. Martin, "John Burningham", in Douglas Martin, The Telling Line: Essays on Fifteen Contemporary Book Illustrators (Julia MacRae Books, 1989), pp. 215–27
