= Lenore Newman =

Canadian author and geographer

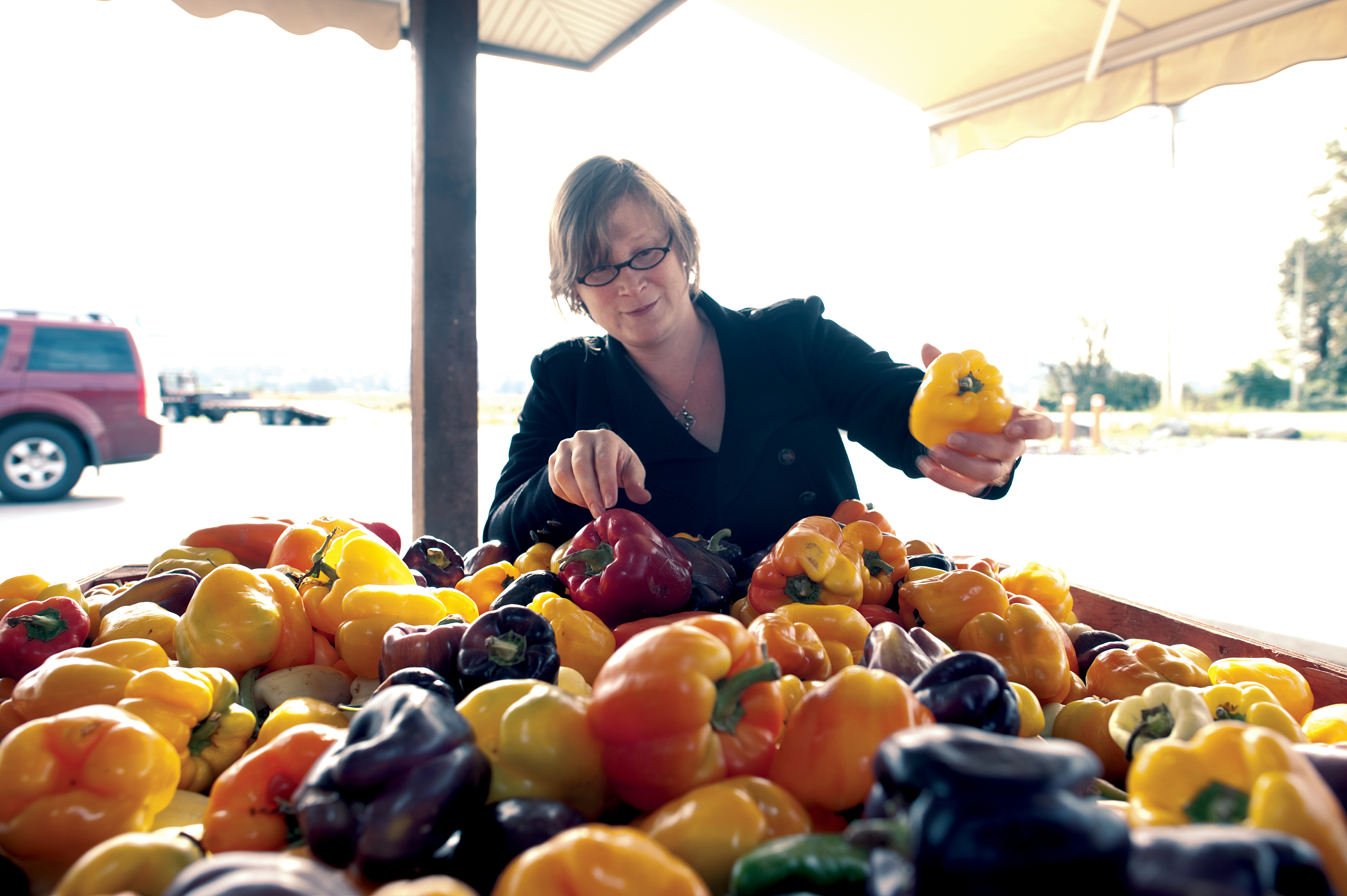
Newman selecting peppers

Lenore Newman (born 1973) is a Canadian author and geographer. She is associate professor of geography and the environment at the University of the Fraser Valley and director of the Food and Agriculture Institute. She holds a research chair in food and agriculture innovation and is a past Canada Research Chair in Food Security and the Environment.

== Biography ==
Newman was born in Sechelt, a coastal town in British Columbia, and raised in a fishing family. She attended the University of British Columbia, where she received a BSc (Hons) in Physics, and then completed an MES and PhD at York University.

Newman studies agricultural and culinary geography. She has conducted fieldwork around the globe, studying public markets, regional cuisines, farmland preservation, global food security, and the ecology of the world's food system. As Canada Research Chair in Food Security and the Environment she researches the impact of climate change on food security and global cuisines. She has published over forty peer-reviewed academic articles in her area of research. In 2014, Newman was inducted into the Royal Society of Canada's College of New Scholars, Artists and Scientists.

Her first book, Speaking in Cod Tongues: A Canadian Culinary Journey, was published in 2017 by the University of Regina Press. It explores regional food cultures across Canada, ultimately arguing for the existence of a distinctly Canadian cuisine and outlining the properties that define it.

Her second book, Lost Feast: Culinary Extinction and the Future of Food was published in 2019 by ECW Press. It explores the foods that humans have eaten to extinction, as well as species currently at risk of extinction due to human consumption and possible ways to avoid these outcomes through food alternatives and better stewardship.

Her third book, Dinner on Mars: The Technologies That Will Feed the Red Planet and Transform Agriculture on Earth, was co-authored with Dr. Evan Fraser and published in 2022 by ECW Press. It discusses the technological innovations that would make it possible to feed a Martian colony, using the challenge of establishing a food system off-world to explore ways of producing food more sustainably on Earth.

Newman currently researches technology and the future of food, agricultural land use policy, and place making through food and agriculture. She also researches agricultural production methods such as vertical farming, cellular agriculture, precision agriculture, and regenerative agriculture, focusing on the way these methods and technologies work together. In 2018 she was appointed to a government committee to strengthen the Agricultural Land Reserve in British Columbia. In 2019 she was appointed to a Food Security Task Force with the mandate to advise the government on ways to apply technology and innovation to support the agricultural sector in British Columbia and to reduce food waste.

== Published works ==
- Speaking in Cod Tongues: A Canadian Culinary Journey. Regina: University of Regina Press, 2017.
- Lost Feast: Culinary Extinction and the Future of Food. Toronto: ECW Press, 2019.
- Dinner on Mars: The Technologies That Will Feed the Red Planet and Transform Agriculture on Earth, co-authored with Evan D.G. Fraser. Toronto: ECW Press, 2022.
