= Borka: The Adventures of a Goose with No Feathers =

1963 picture book by John Burningham

First US edition

Borka: The Adventures of a Goose with No Feathers is a children's picture book written and illustrated by John Burningham and published by Jonathan Cape in 1963. It features a goose born without feathers, whose mother knits a jersey that helps in some ways.

== About the book ==
Borka was Burningham's first published book as an author or illustrator. For it he won the 1963 Kate Greenaway Medal from the Library Association, recognising the year's best children's book illustration by a British subject. For the 50th anniversary of the Medal (1955–2005), a panel of experts named it one of the top ten winning works, which composed the ballot for a public election of the nation's favourite.

== Summary ==
Mr and Mrs Plumpster are a gander and a goose who live in a marshland near the East Coast of England. Every spring, the Plumpsters return to the same spot to lay their eggs and raise their young as their ancestors had done before.

One spring, Mr and Mrs Plumpster have six new goslings named Archie, Freda, Jennifer, Oswald, Timothy, and Borka. Even though Borka looks the same as her siblings and the other geese in the marshland, she is born without feathers. The doctor goose the Plumpsters consult with says the only solution is for Borka to wear fake feathers. So, Mrs Plumpster knits Borka a jersey. Borka loves her jersey as it keeps her warm, but the other geese laugh at her. As the seasons pass by, Borka's siblings grow up and begin practicing for their annual migration, a skill she won't be able to accomplish due to her lack of feathers. Borka even attempts to swim, but quits because it takes a long time for her jersey to dry.

Come autumn, the geese fly away, leaving Borka sad and alone. To keep herself warm, Borka gets on board the Crombie, a boat belonging to Captain McAllister, who is sailing to London with his dog Fowler, and his first mate Fred. In exchange for doing chores, Borka is allowed to stay on the boat until it reaches London, and she becomes friends with the crew.

When the quartet arrive in London, Captain McAllister and his crew leave Borka in Kew Gardens, promising to visit her. In Kew Gardens, the other birds do not mind Borka's jersey and she becomes close with Ferdinand, a gander who teaches her how to swim.

Borka spends the rest of her life living in Kew Gardens with Ferdinand, and enjoying visits by Captain McAllister, Fowler, and Fred.

== Publication history ==
Random House published the U.S. edition in February 1964 (44 pages; ISBN 0224064940).

== Review ==
According to Kirkus Reviews, Borka is an ugly duckling who "does not undergo a transformation; she is as bald as a goose as she was when a gosling. ... The freely stylized illustrations in bold lines and appropriate, vivid colors are many and strong."

== See also ==
- The Ugly Duckling
