= Milan Asadurov =

Bulgarian author, publisher, and translator (1949–2019)

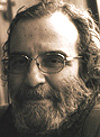
- Asadurov in 2006
- Born: 29 December 1949; Varna, Bulgaria
- Died: 7 June 2019 (aged 69); Varna
- Occupations: author, translator, publisher

Milan Asadurov (Bulgarian: Милан Асадуров; 29 December 1949 – 7 June 2019) was a Bulgarian author, publisher, and translator of science fiction. He wrote short stories and scripts for television and radio since 1968.

== Biography ==
In 1979, he founded one of the first, most popular, and longest running science fiction publishers’ series in Bulgaria called “Galaxy”, with more than 100 books to date. Authors published in the catalogue range from Isaac Asimov, Raymond Chandler, Ray Bradbury, Strugatsky Brothers, and Ursula K. Le Guin to Yordan Radichkov, William Faulkner, and Herbert Wells. Some of them published for the first time in Bulgarian.

Milan Asadurov translated a number of books by Arkady and Boris Strugatsky “Roadside Picnic" or "Stalker" (1980), “The Ugly Swans” (1982), “Beetle in the Anthill” (1984), “The Time Wanderers” (1985), “The Doomed City” (1990) and “A Tale of the Troika” (1993) among them. He was editor-in-chief of The Lighthouse Almanac and the scientific series of Neptun Publishing where he published works by Thor Heyerdahl and Jacques-Yves Cousteau.

In 1982, together with the photographer Angel Zlatanov, he traveled from Krapets to Ahtopol and wrote a succession of 12 articles about the history of lighthouses on Bulgaria's Black Sea shoreline. He was editor-in-chief of Maritime Magazine through the 1970s and ran his shows on radio and TV through the 1980s. In 1991 he founded his own publishing house and a bookstore "Stalker". In 1997, he published the first book of his science fiction trilogy Tales of Naught - “Library or No Way”, “Second Library”, “Dictionary of Naught”. In 1999, Asadurov translated and published Events by Daniil Kharms and in 2007 Lev Gumilyov's "Ethnogenesis and the Biosphere of Earth".

== Bibliography ==
- The Library“ (1997)
- The Second Library“ (1998)
- Dictionary of The Naught“ (1998)
- Mysteries“ (1999)
- Lighthouses on The Bulgarian Black Sea Shore (1982–2007)
- 61 (2011)
