= Anne Rivers Siddons =

American novelist (1936–2019)

- Born: Sybil Anne Rivers; January 9, 1936; Fairburn, Georgia, U.S.
- Died: September 11, 2019 (aged 83); Charleston, South Carolina, U.S.
- Education: Auburn University
- Occupation: Novelist
- Spouse: Heyward Siddons
- Writing career
- Period: 1975–2019
- Genre: Southern United States literature

Anne Rivers Siddons (born Sybil Anne Rivers, January 9, 1936 – September 11, 2019) was an American novelist who wrote stories set in the southern United States.

== Early years ==
The only child of Marvin and Katherine Rivers, she was born in Atlanta, Georgia, was raised in Fairburn, Georgia, and attended Auburn University, where she majored in illustration after initially studying architecture. She was named Loveliest of the Plains and was a member of the Delta Delta Delta sorority. While at Auburn she wrote a column for the student newspaper, The Auburn Plainsman, that favored integration. The university administration attempted to suppress the column (when she refused to reconsider what she wrote, the piece ran with a disclaimer), and ultimately fired her, and the column garnered national attention.

== Career ==
Following her college graduation, Siddons worked in advertising, but her desire to write led her to journalism, and in 1963 she became a writer for Atlanta magazine, where she eventually became a senior editor.

Siddons' debut novel was Heartbreak Hotel (1976). Peachtree Road, set in Atlanta, was a bestselling novel described as "the Southern novel for our generation" by Pat Conroy. More than a million copies are in print. In 1989 her book Heartbreak Hotel became a movie titled Heart of Dixie, which starred Ally Sheedy, Virginia Madsen, Phoebe Cates, Treat Williams, Kyle Secor, and Peter Berg.

Siddons's book The House Next Door was adapted for a made-for-television movie that aired in 2006 on Lifetime Television, starring Mark-Paul Gosselaar, Colin Ferguson, and Lara Flynn Boyle. The film tells the story of a woman who is drawn to a home filled with an evil presence that preys on its inhabitants’ weaknesses.

In 1994, Siddons signed with HarperCollins to write four books for $13 million. She signed a three-book contract with Warner Books and her novel titled Off Season was released in 2008. Her novel "Burnt Mountain" made many best books of the year lists in 2011.

== Reception ==
Stephen King, in his non-fiction review of the horror medium, Danse Macabre, listed The House Next Door as one of the finest horror novels of the 20th Century, and provides a lengthy review of the novel in its "Horror Fiction" section.

== Personal life ==
At the age of thirty, she married Heyward Siddons, who died April 8, 2014. She struggled with four years of depression in the early 1980s, essentially stopping her writing. In 1991, she received an honorary degree in Doctor of Letters from Oglethorpe University. She lived in Charleston, South Carolina, and spent summers in Maine. Siddons died on September 11, 2019, at the age of 83 in Charleston.

== Selected works ==
=== Novels ===
- Heartbreak Hotel (1976)
- The House Next Door (1978)
- Fox's Earth (1981)
- Homeplace (1987)
- Peachtree Road (1988)
- Kings Oak (1990)
- Outer Banks (1991)
- Colony (1992)
- Hill Towns (1993)
- Downtown (1994)
- Fault Lines (1995)
- Up Island (1997)
- Low Country (1998)
- Nora, Nora (2000)
- Islands (2004)
- Sweetwater Creek (2005)
- Off Season (2008)
- Burnt Mountain (7/2010)
- The Girls of August (2014)

=== Non-fiction ===
- John Chancellor Makes Me Cry (1975)

=== Filmography ===
- Heart of Dixie (1989), based on Heartbreak Hotel
- The House Next Door (TV) (2006)
