= Peachtree Road (novel) =

Novel by Anne Rivers Siddons

- First edition
- Author: Anne Rivers Siddons
- Language: English
- Genre: Fiction; Southern literature
- Publisher: Harper & Row
- Publication date: 1988
- Publication place: USA
- Pages: 832
- ISBN: 9780061132971

Peachtree Road is an American novel published in 1988 by Anne Rivers Siddons. It is principally set in Atlanta, Georgia and fictionalizes the experience of several wealthy Atlanta families from the 1930s through the 1970s. The title refers to the section of Peachtree Street that runs through the Buckhead neighborhood of Atlanta and where the central character's family home is located.
