= Psychiatry, Psychology and Law =

- Discipline: Forensic psychology Forensic psychiatry
- Language: English
- Edited by: Mark Nolan

Publication details
- History: 1994–present
- Publisher: Taylor & Francis
- Frequency: 5/year
- Impact factor: 0.744 (2018)

Standard abbreviations
- ISO 4: Psychiatry Psychol. Law

Indexing
- CODEN: PPLAFQ
- ISSN: 1321-8719 (print); 1934-1687 (web)
- LCCN: 2004699078
- OCLC no.: 1004533326

Links
- Journal homepage; Online access; Online archive

Psychiatry, Psychology and Law is a peer-reviewed academic journal covering forensic psychology and forensic psychiatry. It was established in 1994 and is published by Taylor & Francis on behalf of the Australian and New Zealand Association of Psychiatry, Psychology and Law. The editor-in-chief is Mark Nolan. From 1994 to 2019 it was edited by Ian Freckelton. According to the Journal Citation Reports, the journal has a 2018 impact factor of 0.744.
