= Henry Horwitz =

American historian (1938–2019)

Henry Horwitz (August 8, 1938 – January 19, 2019) was an American historian specialising in late seventeenth century English politics.

== Life ==
Horwitz was born on August 8, 1938. He died on January 19, 2019.

== Academic career ==
Horwitz was awarded a D.Phil. from the University of Oxford in 1963 and a J.D. from the University of Iowa College of Law in 1982. He started working for Iowa University in 1963 and retired in April 2004.

== Works ==
- Revolution Politicks. The Career of Daniel Finch Second Earl of Nottingham, 1647-1730 (Cambridge: Cambridge University Press, 1968).
- Parliament, Policy and Politics in the Reign of William III (Manchester: Manchester University Press, 1977).
