= Sinceramente =

2019 book by Cristina Fernández de Kirchner

- Author: Cristina Fernández de Kirchner
- Language: Spanish
- Subject: Politics
- Publisher: Sudamericana (Penguin Random House)
- Publication date: April 25, 2019
- Publication place: Argentina
- Pages: 595
- ISBN: 978-9-500-76303-5

Sinceramente (Spanish for 'sincerely') is the first book written by Cristina Fernández de Kirchner, former President of Argentina and former Vice President. She announced the publication of the book by surprise on April 23, 2019 on her Twitter account. Fernández de Kirchner stated that the book "is not autobiographical nor is it an enumeration of personal or political achievements, it is a look and a retrospective reflection to unravel some facts and chapters of recent history and how they have impacted the lives of Argentines and mine as well."

Released months before the general election, the release of Sinceramente was considered by some political analysts as the first sign of the launch of Fernández de Kirchner's presidential candidacy. However, Fernández de Kirchner announced on May 18 that she will be running for Vice President, accompanying her former Chief of the Cabinet Alberto Fernández as a candidate for the presidency.

Although it was set to be released on April 26, the book began to be sold in Buenos Aires libraries the day before and sold out almost immediately. Sinceramente has been considered "the editorial phenomenon of the year", with the sixty thousand copies of the first edition selling out in one hour. As such, the "sales phenomenon" of the day of its publication has been compared to that of Argentine bestsellers Malvinas, la trama secreta (1983) and Nunca Más (1984). During the first two weeks after its release and before its official presentation, Sinceramente sold 300,000 copies and collected 120 million pesos.

== Reception ==
Journalist Luis Majul considered that the book was not up to the standards of books written by former presidents, as it would not serve as a legacy or an ordered explanation of her ideas. Instead, it would be a disorganized selection of trivial anecdotes. He also pointed that most of the events are explained with a conspiracy theory of some sort.

== Tour ==
The book was first presented at the Buenos Aires International Book Fair. It was followed by events in La Matanza, La Plata, Mar del Plata and Malvinas Argentinas (Buenos Aires Province), Mendoza, Santiago del Estero, Chaco, Misiones, Calafate and Rio Gallegos (Santa Cruz Province) and Rosario (Santa Fe province). The final presentation took place in the Havana's International Book Fair in Cuba.

== See also ==
- Kirchnerism
- Presidency of Cristina Fernández de Kirchner
- Presidency of Néstor Kirchner
