= 2019 in France =

- Decades: 1990s; 2000s; 2010s; 2020s; 2030s
- See also: History of France; Timeline of French history; List of years in France

This article lists major events that happened in 2019 in France.

== Incumbents ==
- President – Emmanuel Macron (REM)
- Prime Minister – Édouard Philippe (LR)

== Events ==
=== January ===
- 12 January – 2019 Paris explosion: An explosion occurs at a bakery on Rue de Trevise in Paris' 9th arrondissement, killing four people and injuring forty-seven others.
- 14 January – The Brest University Hospital Center becomes the first hospital in the world to acquire a PET scan.
- 15 January – Launch of the Great National Debate
- 22 January – Signing of the Aachen Treaty in Aachen, 56 years to the day after the signing of the Élysée Treaty

=== February ===
- 5 February – February 2019 Paris fire: A suspected arson at an apartment block on Rue Erlanger in Paris' 16th arrondissement kills ten people, making it the deadliest fire in Paris since 2005.
- 6 February – Matthieu Orphelin, member of the French National Assembly for Maine-et-Loire's 1st constituency, close to the former minister of ecology Nicolas Hulot, leaves the LREM's parliamentary group to protest against the government's ecological policy.
- 7 February – Following the growing diplomatic tensions between the French government and the Italian government, the French ambassador to Italy, Christian Masset is recalled to France.
- 8 February – 34th Victoires de la Musique
- 13 February –
  - Alain Juppé, Jacques Mézard and François Pillet are proposed to enter the Constitutional Council to replace Lionel Jospin, Michel Charasse and Jean-Jacques Hyest
  - 25th Victoires de la musique classique
- 19 February – Alexandre Benalla is remanded for violating the judicial review he was subjected to.
- 22 February – 44th César Awards
- 24 February – Nearly 2000 hectares ravaged by 49 fire departures in less than 24 hours in Corsica.
- 25 February – The Secretary of State for the Digital Sector, Mounir Mahjoubi, reveals that an attack on the central Internet directory ICANN is underway.

=== March ===
- 2 March – Riots in Grenoble, due to the death of two teenagers riding a scooter who collided with a bus while being pursued by a police patrol.
- 12 March – Cargo ship Grande America sinks after catching fire on 10 March in the Bay of Biscay, approximately 200 kilometres (120 mi) west of France, causing a 2,200-tonne oil spill.
- 16 March – Yellow vests movement: Protests against President Emmanuel Macron enter a fourth month in Paris. Tear gas is fired at protesters throwing stones at riot police in front of the Arc de Triomphe, news stands are torched at the Champs-Élysées, and a branch of Banque Tarneaud is burned. More than 80 arrests are made. Businesses around the Champs-Élysées are looted.
- 27 March – Nathalie Loiseau, Benjamin Griveaux and Mounir Mahjoubi leave the government.
- 31 March – Amélie de Montchalin, Sibeth Ndiaye and Cédric O enter the government to replace the previous three.

=== April ===
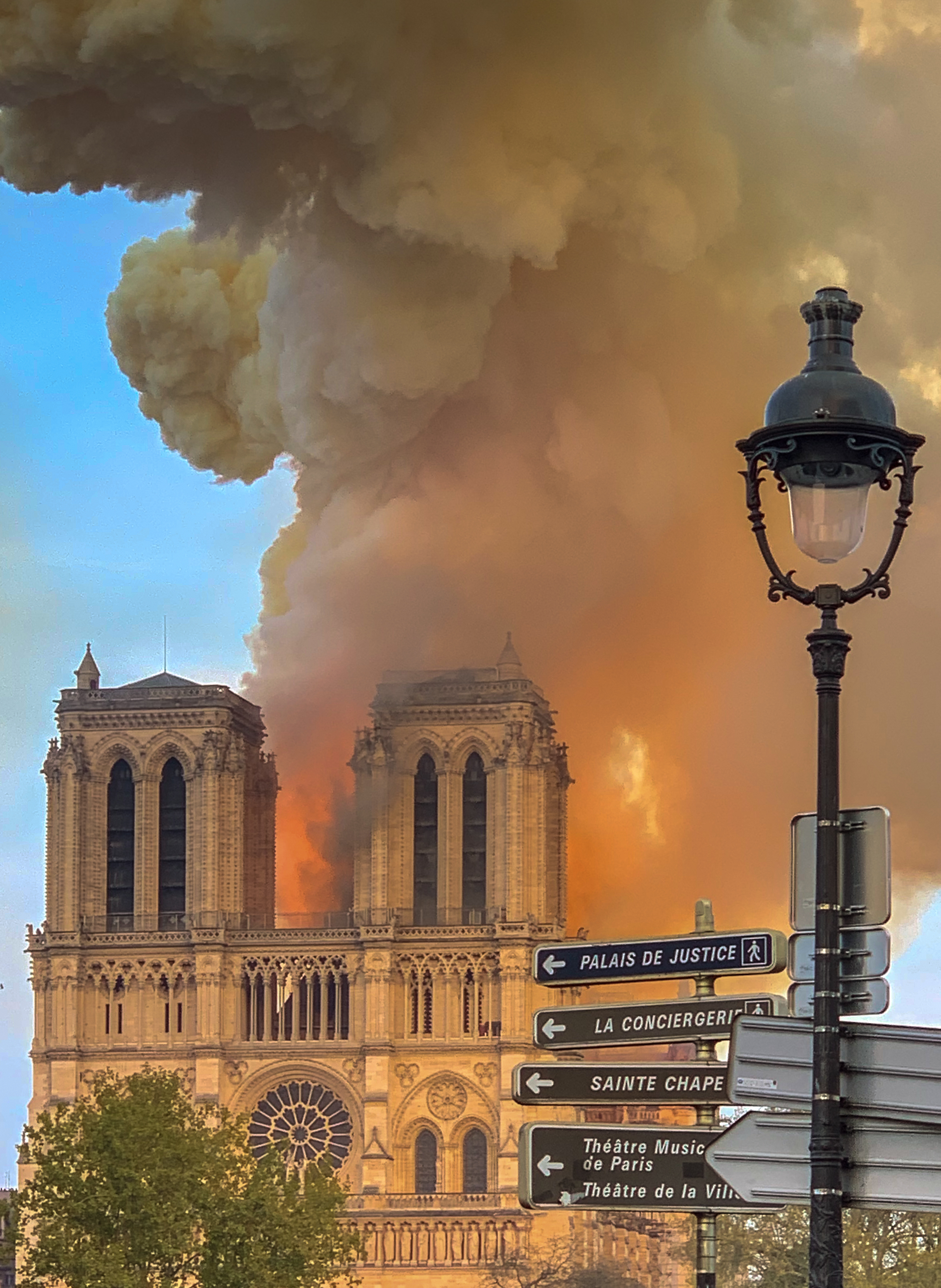
Notre-Dame de Paris fire

- 15 April – A major fire engulfs Notre-Dame Cathedral in Paris, resulting in the roof and main spire collapsing.

=== May ===
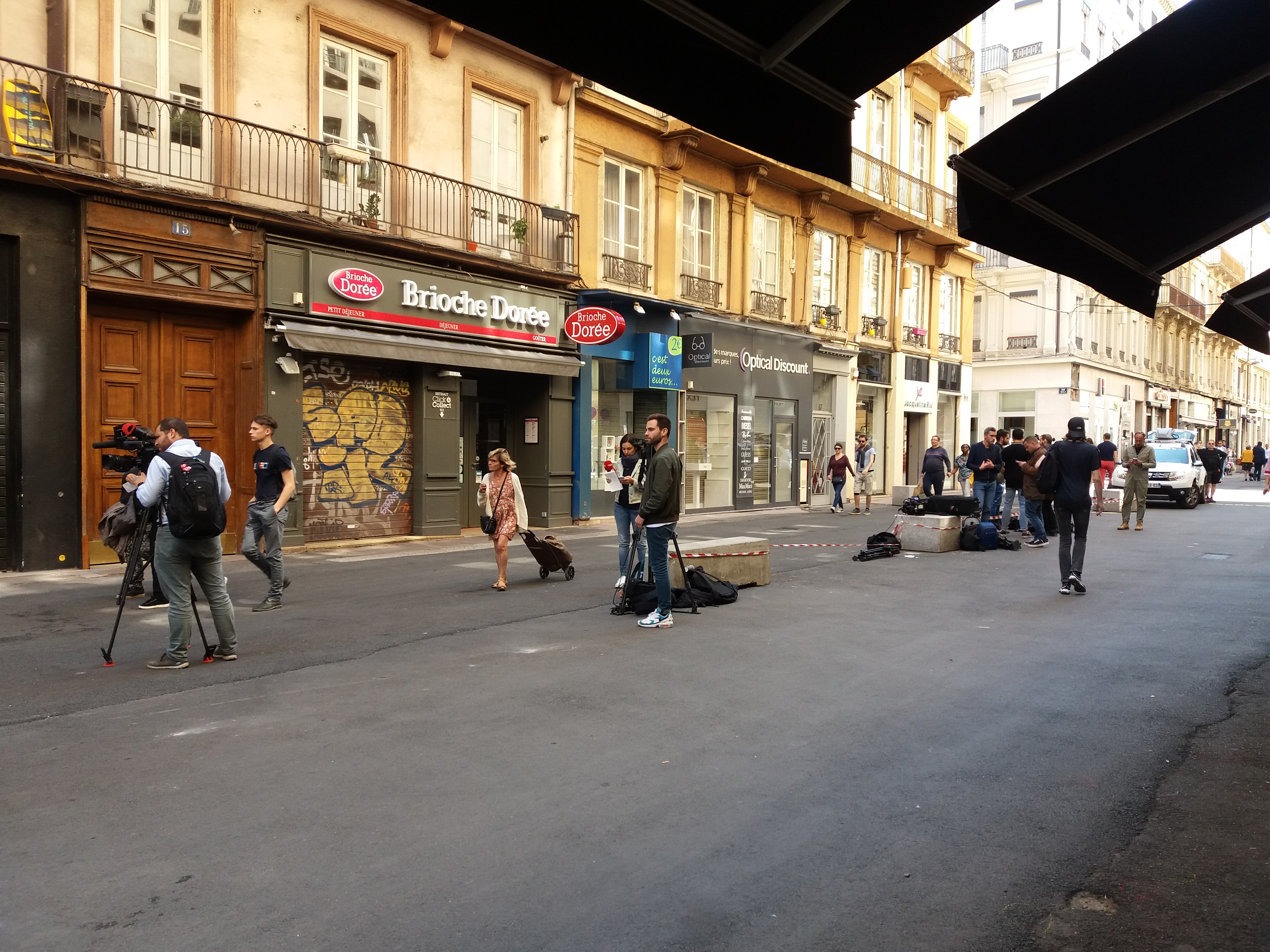
2019 Lyon bomb attack

- 14 May –
  - National tribute to Cédric de Pierrepont and Alain Bertoncello, soldiers killed during the fight of Gorom-Gorom.
  - Beginning of the 2019 Cannes Film Festival
- 24 May – The explosion of a parcel bombed in Lyon injures 14 people.
- 26 May – 2019 European Parliament election

=== June ===
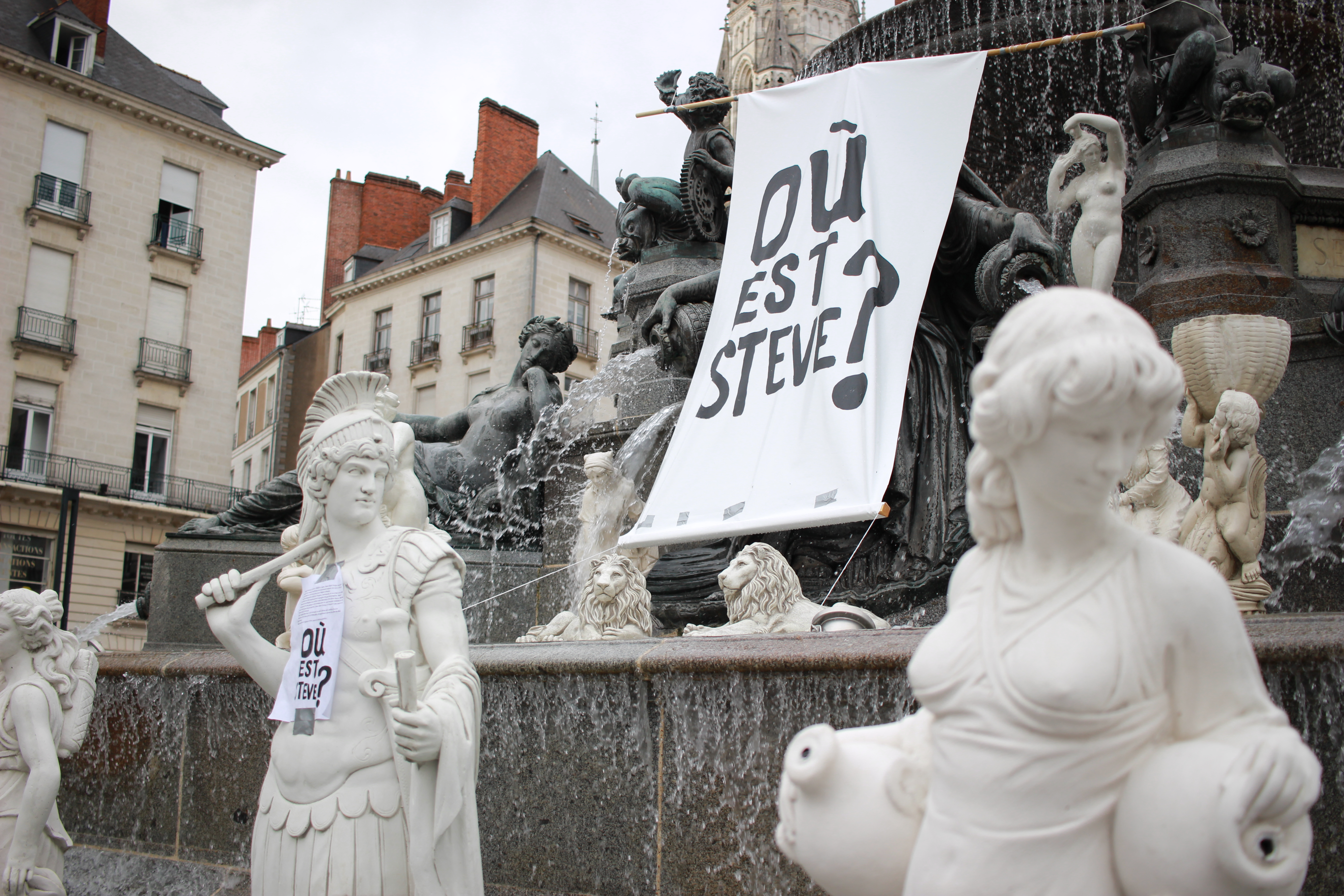
Mobilization following the disappearance of Steve Maia Caniço

- 5 June – Valérie Pécresse, president of the Regional Council of Île-de-France and Robin Reda member of the French National Assembly for Essonne's 7th constituency quit The Republicans.
- 6 June – Commemorations mark the 75th anniversary of the Normandy landings.
- 7 June –
  - A SNSM boat capsizes in front of Les Sables d'Olonne during a rescue mission of a fisherman caught in the Storm Miguel. 3 rescuers and the fisherman drown.
  - Aina Kuric, member of the French National Assembly for Marne's 2nd constituency, quits the LREM, having been a prominent critic of the asylum-immigration bill proposed by the government in July 2018, but stays within the LREM's parliamentary group.
  - Beginning of the 2019 FIFA Women's World Cup.
- 9 June – A driver refuses to obey a check and hits 2 children in Lorient after a chase, one of whom dies of his injuries.
- 12 June – Sandrine Josso, member of the French National Assembly for Loire-Atlantique's 7th constituency, quits LREM and the LREM parliamentary group to join the Liberties and Territories group.
- 22 June – Steve Maia Caniço's case begins after the latter's disappearance following a police charge against a group of party-goers.
- 24 June – France is affected by the early European heat wave, absolute temperature records are beaten. Bouches-du-Rhône, Gard, Hérault and Vaucluse have been put under red alert due to potentially very dangerous temperatures. On 25 June Paris reaches its hottest July day on record, with a temperature of 42.6 °C.
- 24 June – Agnès Thill, member of the French National Assembly for Oise's 2nd constituency, is excluded from LREM and the LREM's parliamentary group following homophobic remarks.
- 27 June – The 2019 National Diploma session, originally scheduled for 27 and 28 June, is postponed to 1 and 2 July due to the extreme heat.

=== July ===
- 6 July – Death of Patricia Gallerneau, member of the French National Assembly for Vendée's 2nd constituency. She is replaced by her substitute.
- 7 July - Murder of Johanna Blanes
- 6 to 28 July c 2019 Tour de France.
- 11 July – After a decade, the end of Vincent Lambert case following the death of the latter, who had been brain dead for 10 years.
- 16 July – Resignation of the Minister of Ecological and Solidarity Transition François de Rugy following Mediapart's revelations of his use of public funds. Élisabeth Borne succeeds him.

=== August ===
- 2 August – Crash of a Tracker 22, water bomber plane, near Générac. Franck Chesneaux, a former fighter pilot and a Tracker 22's pilot, died in an operation fighting major fires around Générac. During his national tribute, he is awarded the Legion of Honour and the Medal for internal security (gold medal), posthumously.
- 4 August – Franky Zapata becomes the first person to fly over English Channel on his own invention, the Flyboard Air.
- 6 August – Jean-Mathieu Michel, Mayor of Signes, is overturned by a van that illegally deposited rubble on the side of the road. The mayor will die soon after.
- 28 August –
  - A chemical accident injures 14 people, two of them seriously, in a company located in Avon and Samois-sur-Seine.
  - Emmanuel Macron nominates Sylvie Goulard as candidate for France as European Commissioner.

=== September ===
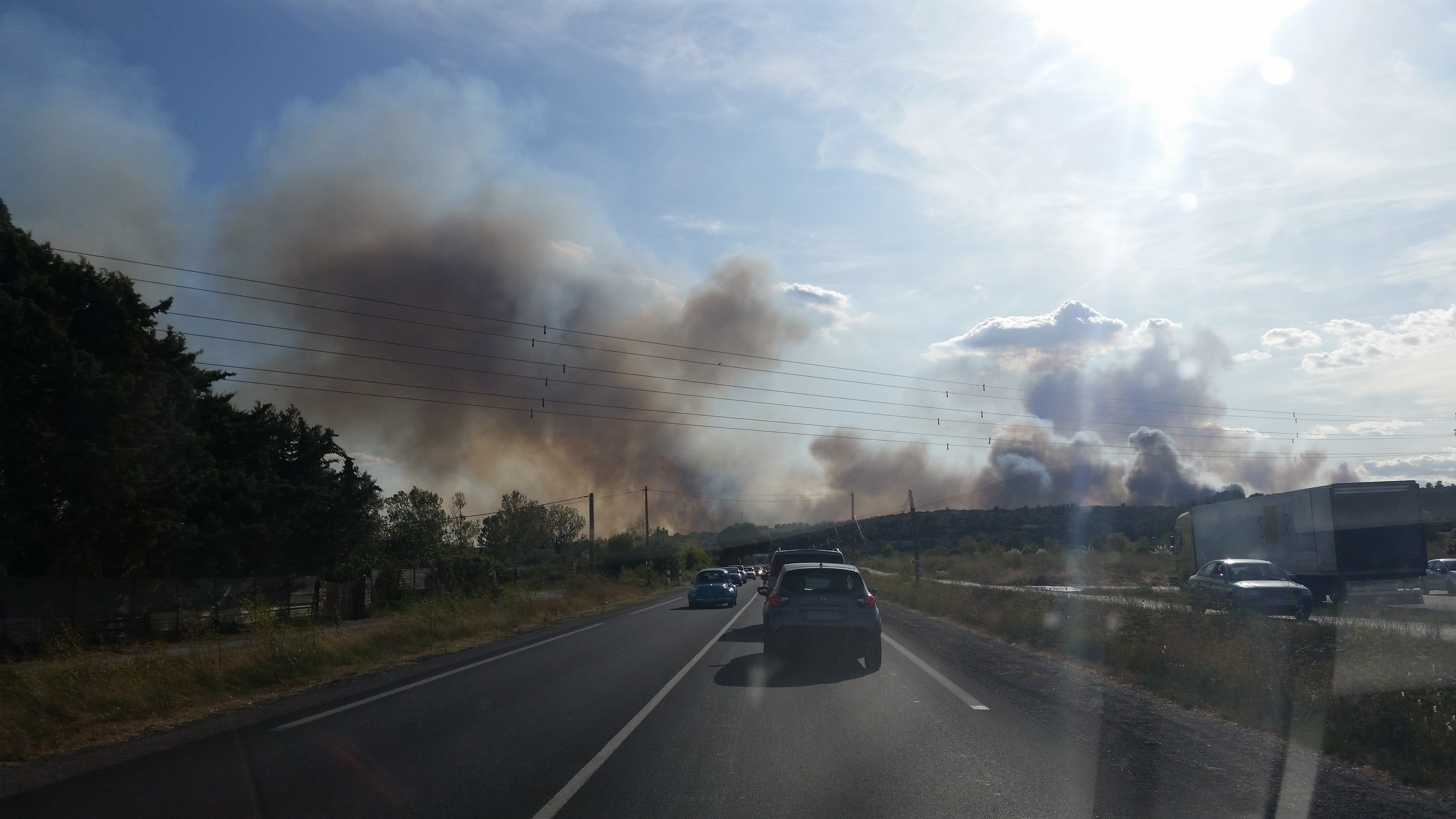
Loupian's fire

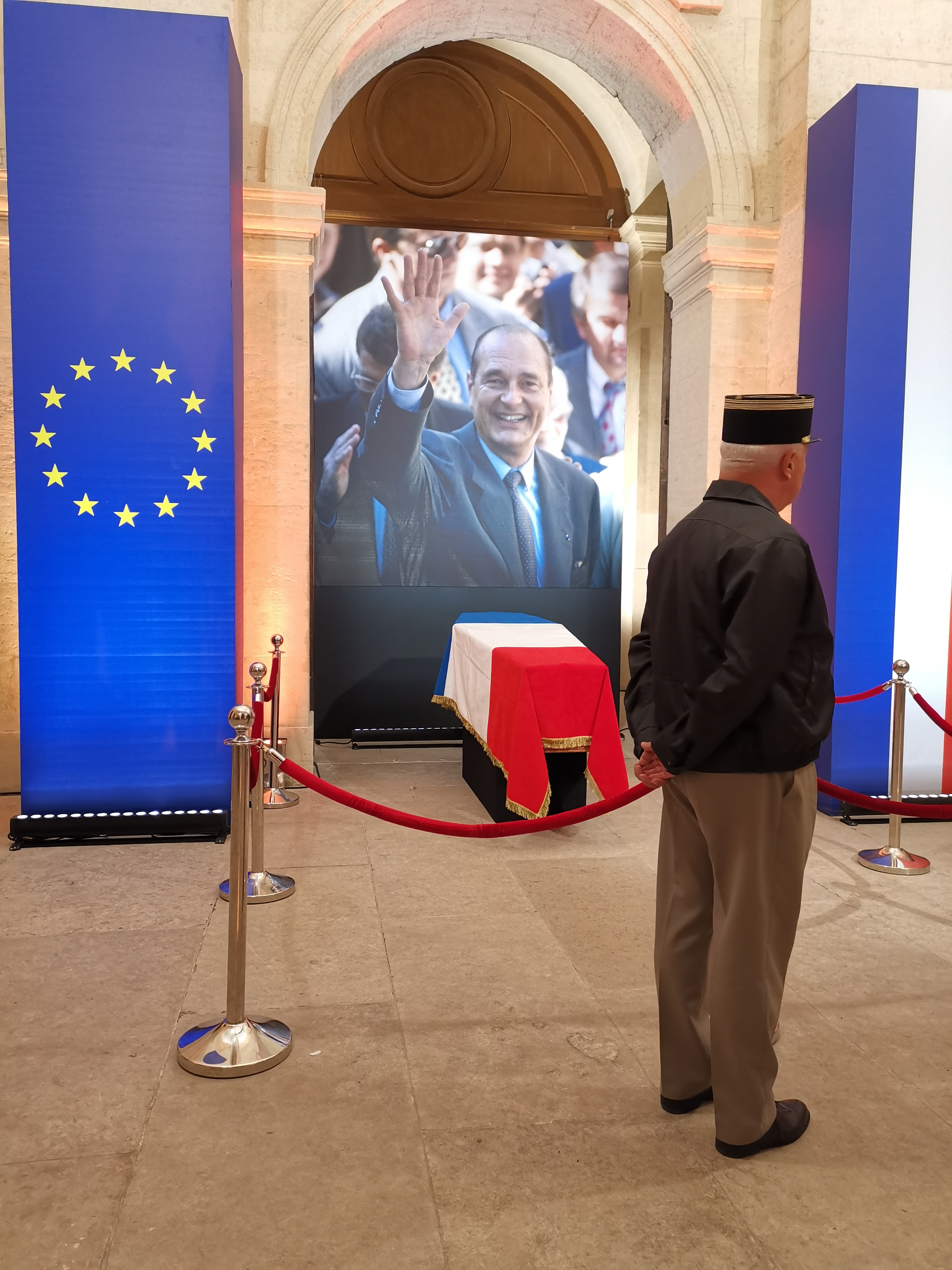
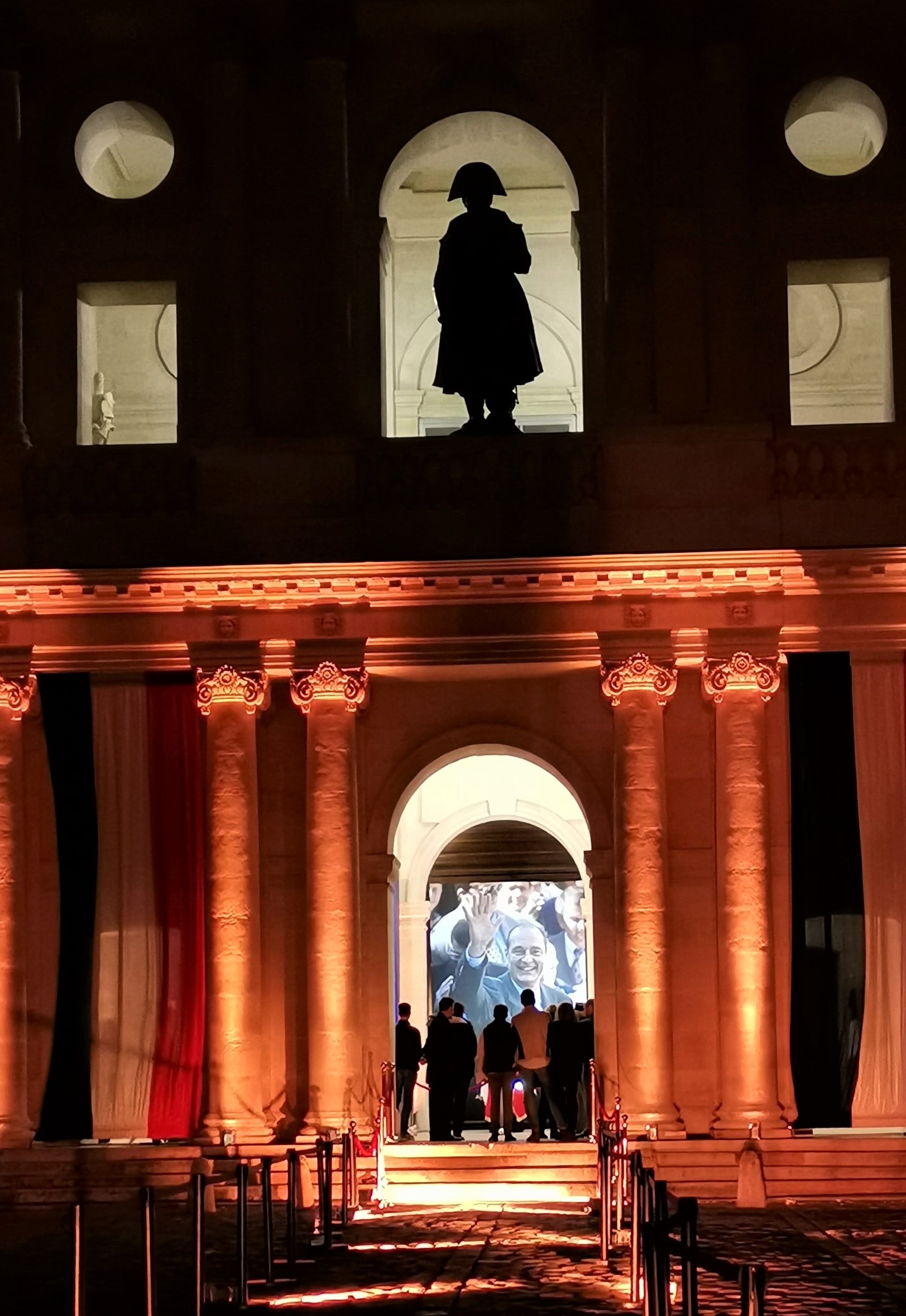
Coffin of Jacques Chirac exposed to the Invalides.
- 3 September – Jean-Paul Delevoye and Jean-Baptiste Djebbari enter the government.
- 8 September – A fire ravages 300 hectares and a house in Loupian.
- 9 September – Albane Gaillot, member of the French National Assembly for Val-de-Marne's 11th constituency, quits the LREM, deploring the vote on "laws restricting individual freedoms".
- 13 September – The mayor of Levallois-Perret Patrick Balkany is sentenced to 4 years in prison with immediate incarceration and 10 years of ineligibility for tax evasion, after a highly publicized three-month trial.
- 26 September – Rouen Lubrizol factory fire : Fire in a chemical factory of the company Lubrizol classified Seveso II high threshold ("high risk"). A thick plume of black smoke forms, reaching more than 20 km. As part of the management of the accident, various measures are taken for the protection of the population (confinement, school closures, suspension of certain agricultural activities, etc.).
- 29 September – popular tribute to Jacques Chirac, who died on 26 September; then national mourning and funeral on 30 September.

=== October ===
- 3 October – Paris police headquarters stabbing
- 28 October – Bayonne mosque shooting

=== November ===
- 11 November – the War Memorial for France in External Operations is inaugurated in Paris.
- 25 November – 2019 Ménaka mid-air collision: a collision between two helicopters results in the death of 13 French soldiers in Mali.
- 29 November – Pascale Fontenel-Personne, member of the French National Assembly for Sarthe's 3rd constituency, quits LREM, following her disagreement with the functioning of the party.

=== December ===
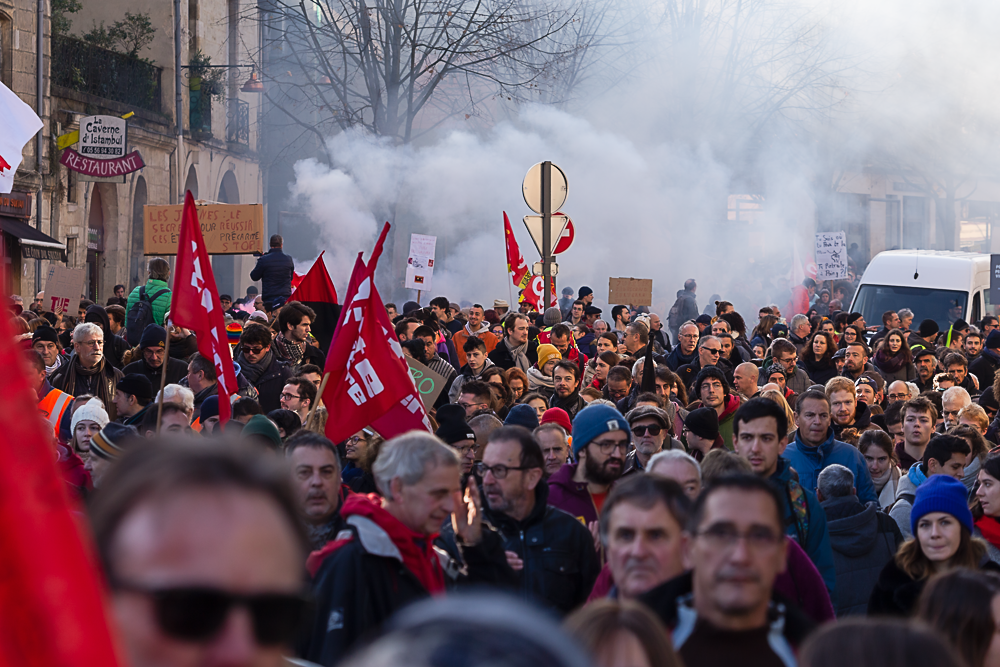
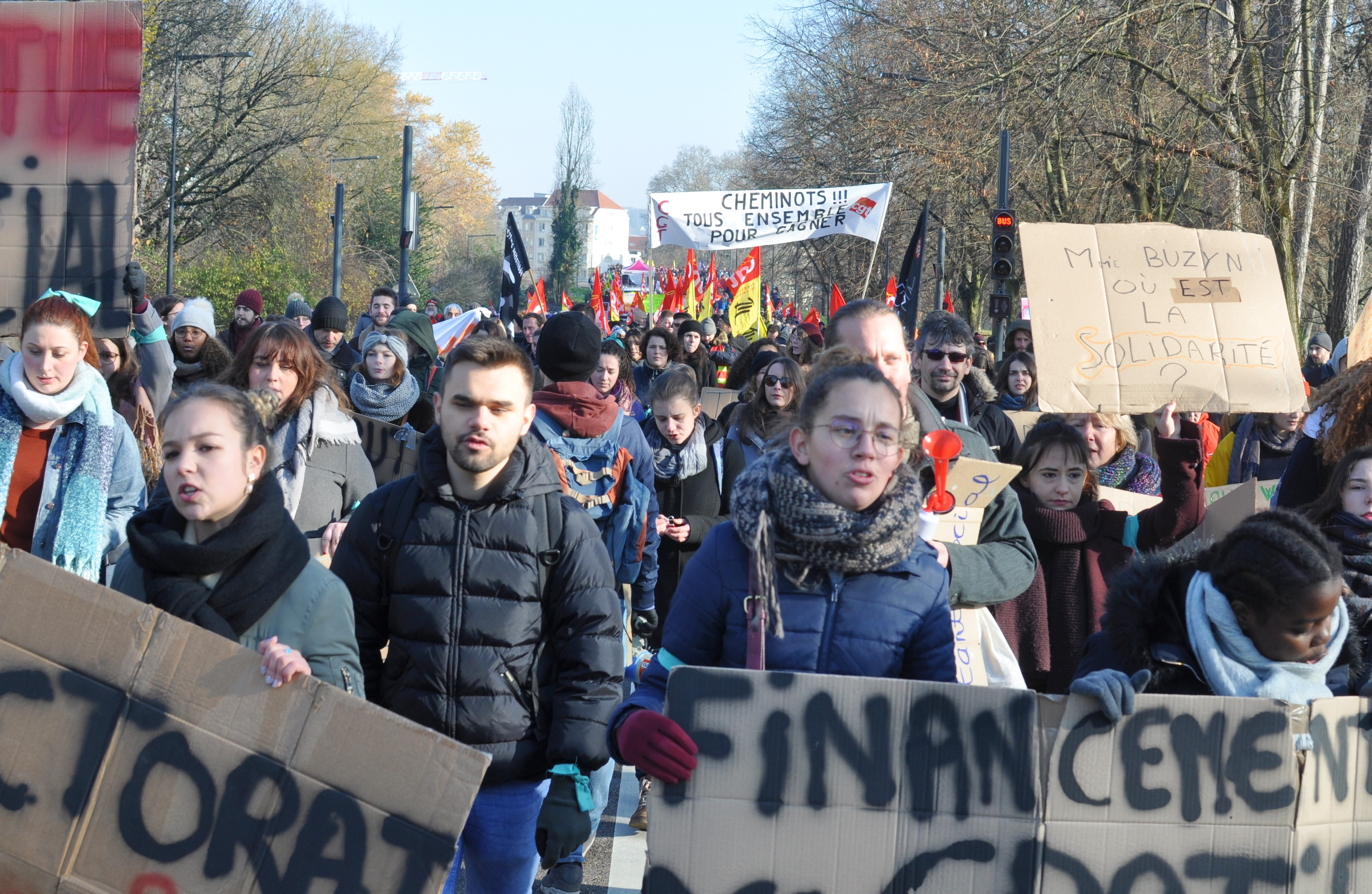
Demonstration against pension reform in Bordeaux and Besançon
- 5 December – Start of a social movement (numerous strikes and demonstrations) to protest against a reform of the pension system.
- 14 December – Miss France 2020.
- 16 December – Resignation of Jean-Paul Delevoye, High Commissioner for Pensions.
- 18 December – Laurent Pietraszewski is appointed Secretary of State for Pensions.
- 31 December –final shutdown of the Longwave transmitter Europe 1.

== Deaths ==
=== January ===
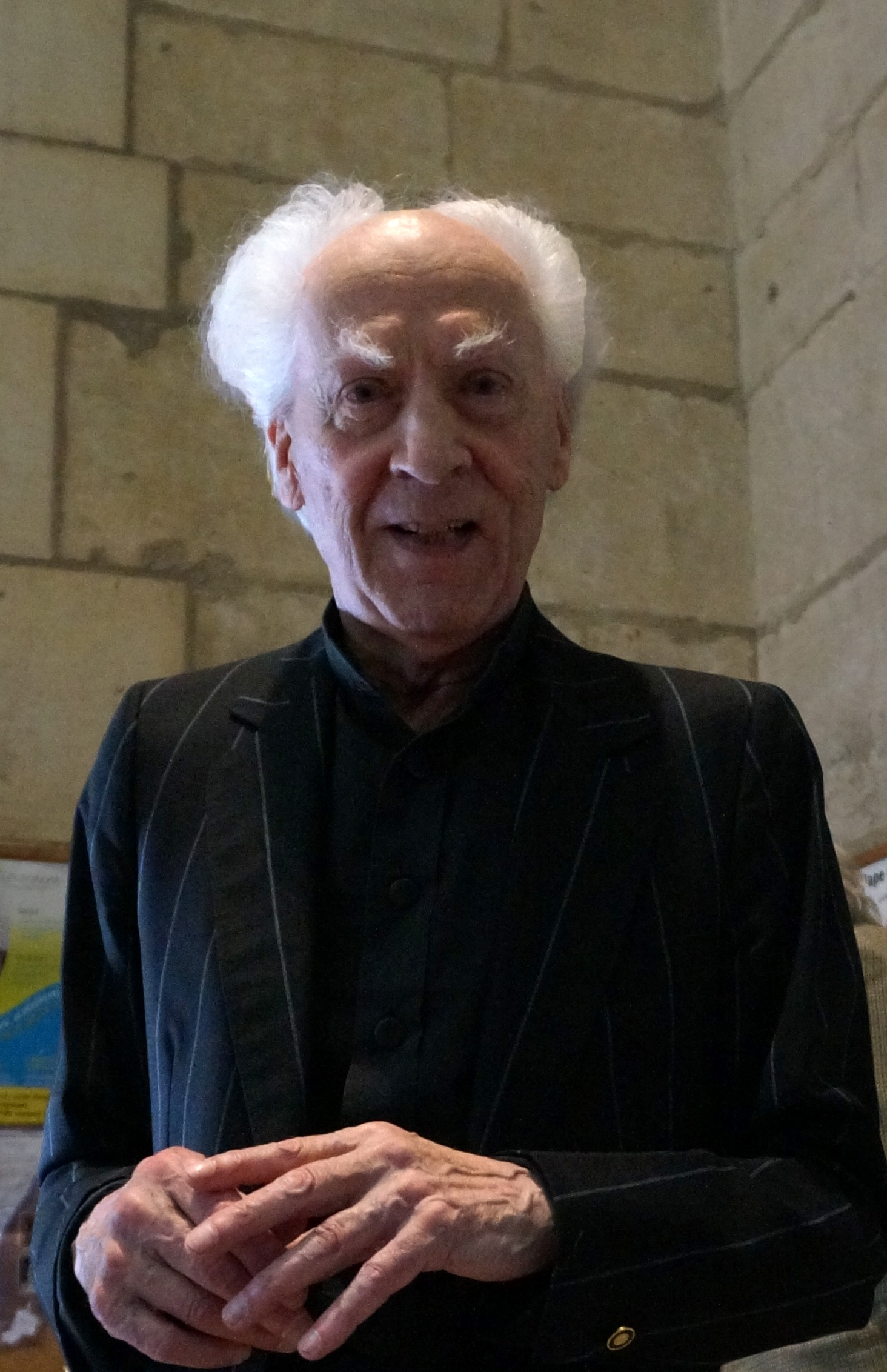
Jean Guillou

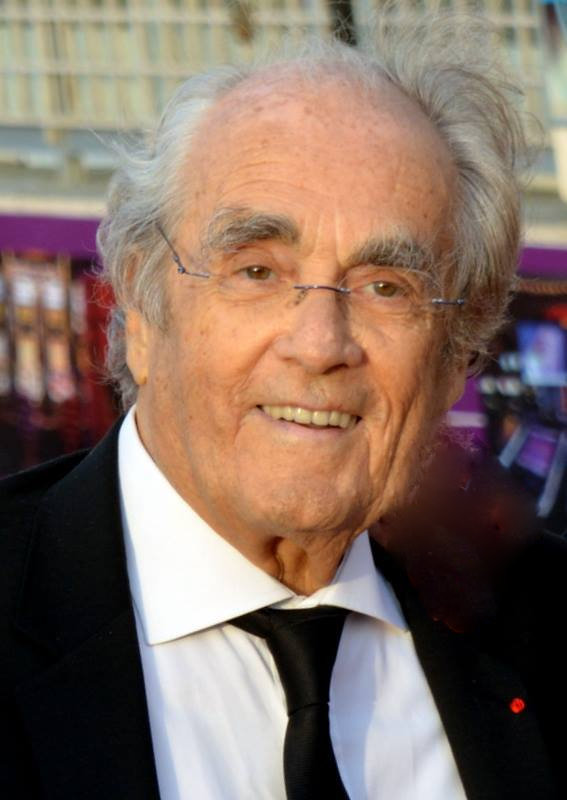
Michel Legrand

- 3 January
  - Roger Bastié, French rugby coach and player (b. 1932)
  - Anne-Marie Minvielle, French journalist (b. 1943)
  - Christine de Rivoyre, French journalist and writer (b. 1921)
- 7 January
  - Guy Charmot, French military doctor and member of the French resistance during World War II (b. 1914)
  - Aline Kiner, French journalist and novelist (b. 1959)
  - Bernard Tchoullouyan, French judoka (b. 1953)
- 8 January – Pierre Barillet, French playwright (b. 1923)
- 10 January
  - Patrick Malrieu, French activist of Breton traditional culture (b. 1945)
  - René Mouille, French aeronautical and space engineer (b. 1924)
- 11 January – Michel Dejouhannet, French professional road bicycle racer (b. 1935)
- 13 January
  - Pierre Alard, French athlete (b. 1937)
  - Guy Sénac, French footballer (b. 1932)
- 15 January – José Souto, French professional footballer and manager (b. 1959)
- 16 January – Denis Sire, French comics artist and illustrator (b. 1953)
- 20 January – François Perrot, French actor (b. 1924)
- 21 January
  - Marcel Azzola, French accordionist (b. 1927)
  - Henri, Count of Paris, Head of the House of Orléans (b. 1933)
- 26 January
  - Jean Guillou, French composer, organist, and pianist (b. 1930)
  - Michel Legrand, French composer (b. 1932)
- 27 January – Henry Chapier, French journalist (b. 1933)
- 29 January – Jean-Pierre Boccardo, French sprinter (b. 1942)
- 31 January
  - Pierre Nanterme, French business executive (b. 1959)
  - Georges Sarre, French politician (b. 1935)

=== February ===
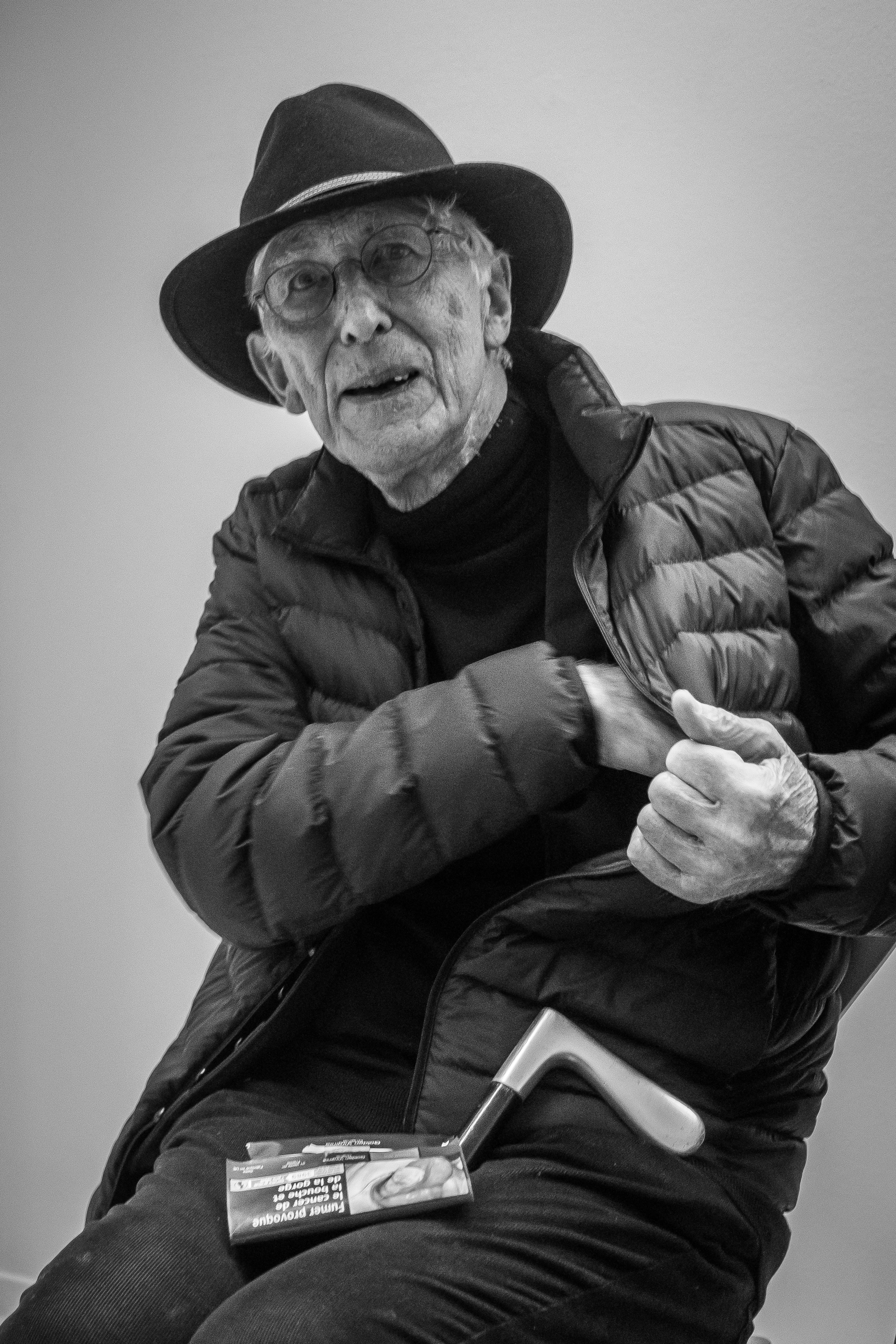
Tomi Ungerer

- 4 February
  - Sandrine Doucet, French politician (b. 1959)
  - Véronique Schiltz, French archaeologist and historian of art (b. 1942)
- 9 February – Tomi Ungerer, French illustrator (b. 1931)
- 14 February – Michel Bernard, French middle- and long-distance runner (b. 1931)
- 16 February – Serge Merlin, French actor (b. 1933)
- 18 February – Jean Périsson, French conductor (b. 1924)
- 19 February – Marie-Claire Bancquart, French poet (b. 1932)
- 21 February – Jean-Christophe Benoît, French baritone (b. 1925)
- 25 February – Roland Leroy, French journalist and politician (b. 1926)
- 27 February
  - Pierrette Fleutiaux, French writer (b. 1941)
  - Michel Sainte-Marie, French politician (b. 1938)

=== March ===
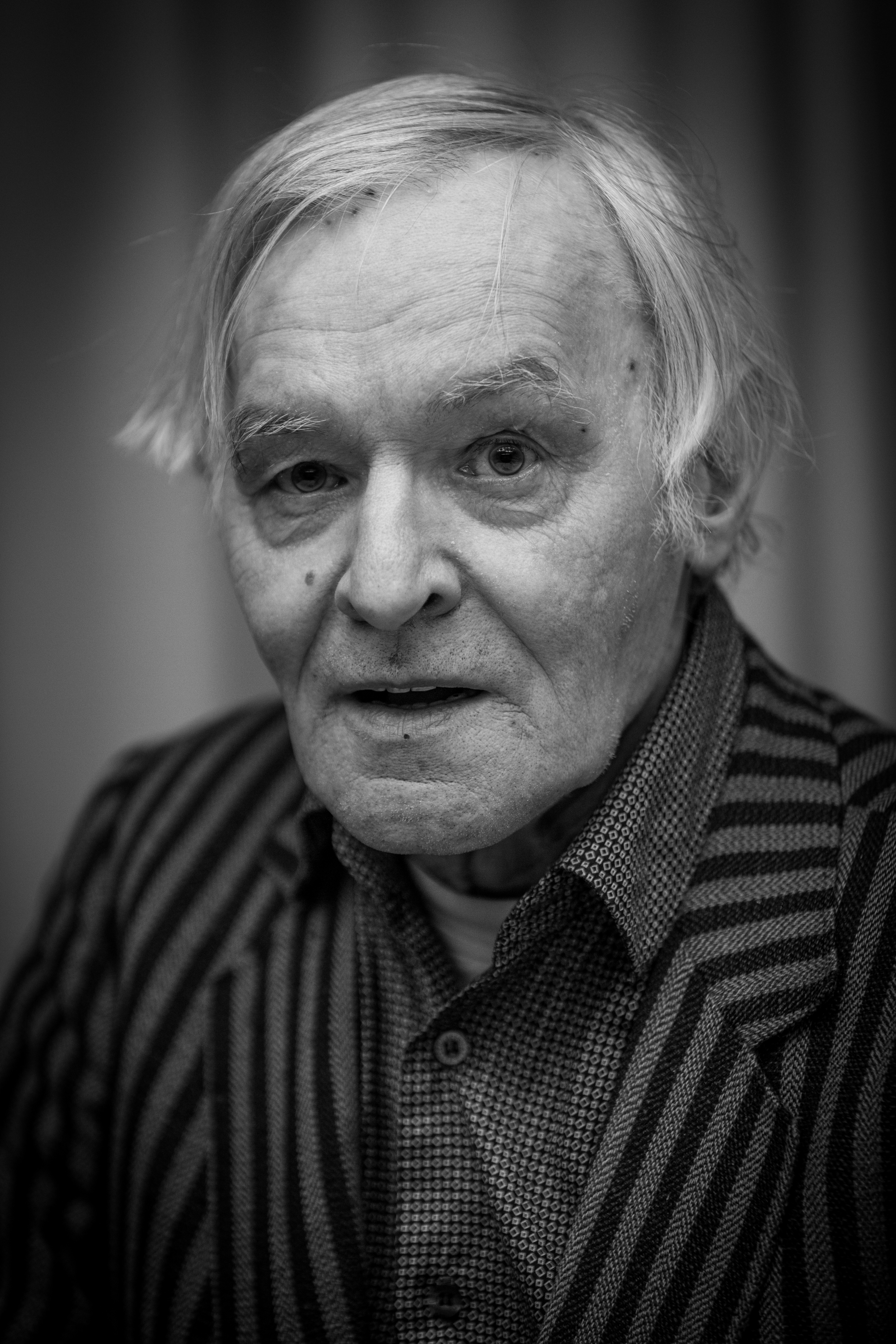
Guillaume Faye

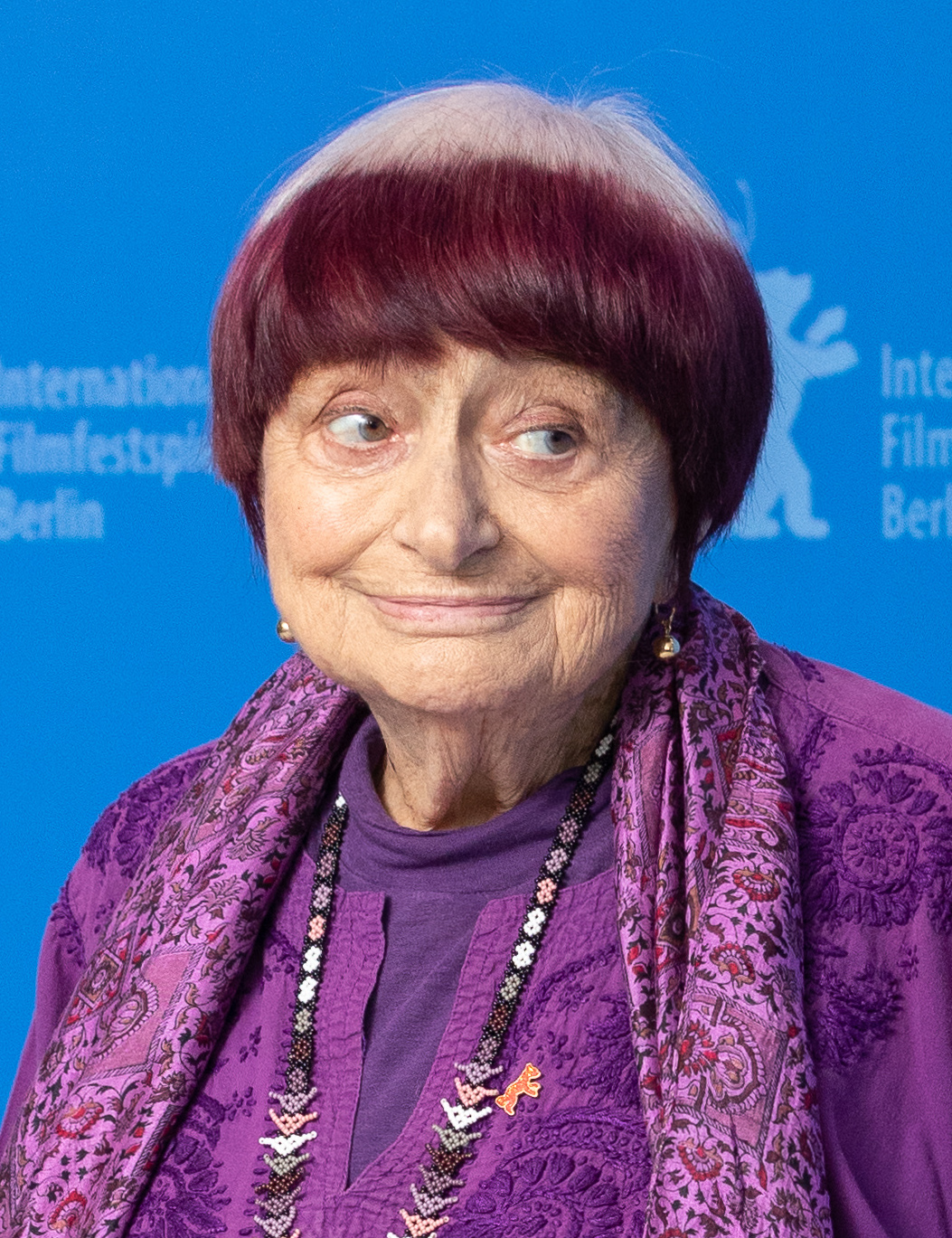
Agnès Varda

- 5 March – Jacques Loussier, French pianist and composer (b. 1934)
- 6 March – Guillaume Faye, French journalist and writer (b. 1949)
- 8 March – Raoul Barrière, French rugby union player and coach (b. 1928)
- 9 March
  - Patrick Grandperret, French film director (b. 1946)
  - Robert Lemaître, French professional footballer (b. 1929)
  - Pierre de Saintignon, French politician (b. 1948)
- 15 March
  - Dominique Noguez, French writer (b. 1942)
  - Jean-Pierre Richard, French writer and literary critic (b. 1922)
- 16 March – Yann-Fañch Kemener, French Breton's traditional singer (b. 1957)
- 17 March – René Fontès, French rugby executive and politician (b. 1941)
- 18 March – Marcel-Pierre Cléach, French politician (b. 1934)
- 23 March – Jacques Dessemme, French basketball player (b. 1925)
- 26 March
  - Michel Bacos, French pilot (b. 1924
  - François Dubanchet, French politician (b. 1923)
- 27 March – Pierre Bourguignon, French politician (b. 1942)
- 28 March – Pierre Lacroix, French rugby union player (b. 1935)
- 29 March – Agnès Varda, French film director (b. 1928)
- 30 March – Maurice Hardouin, French professional footballer (b. 1947)

=== April ===
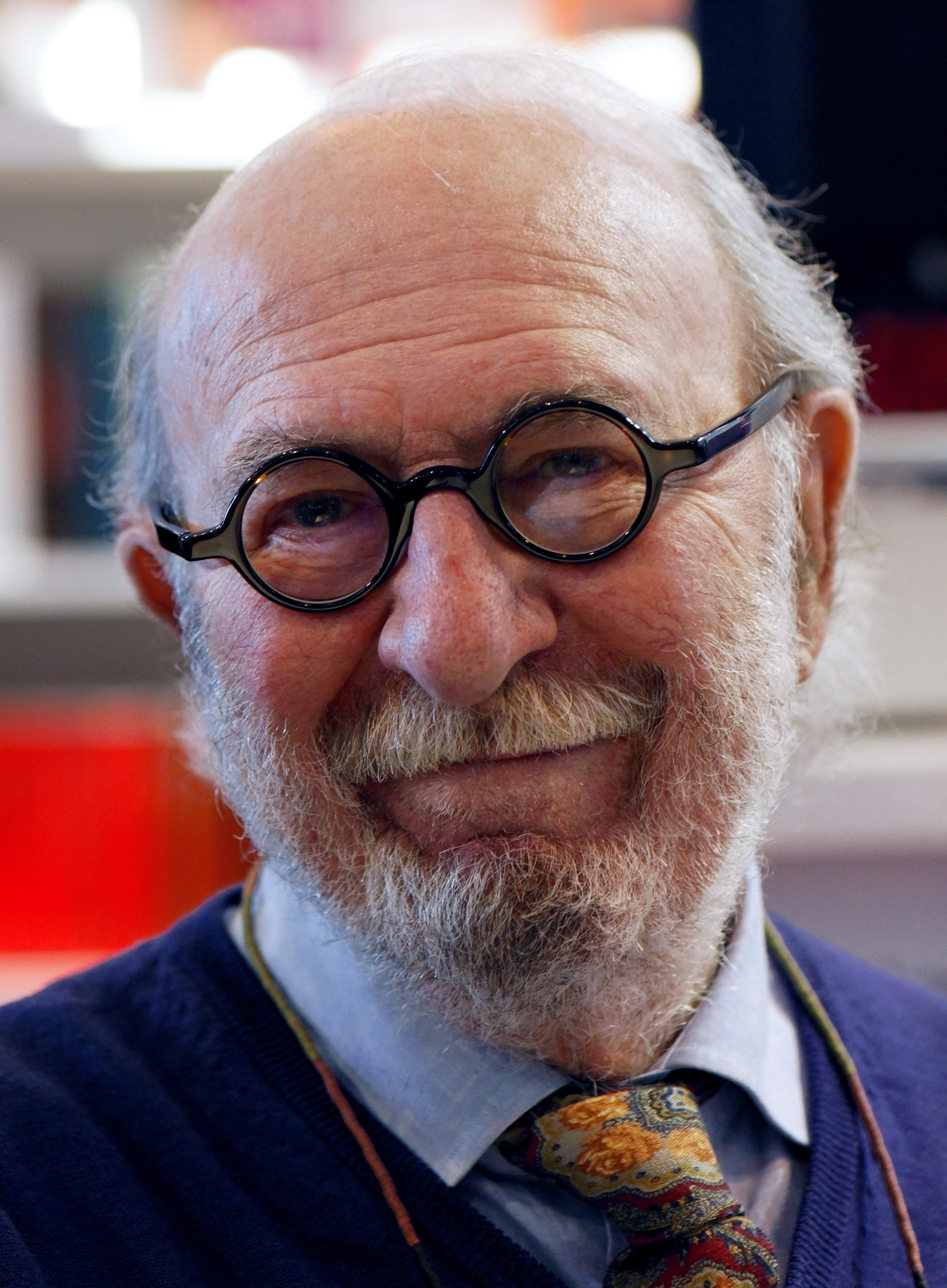
Jean-Pierre Marielle

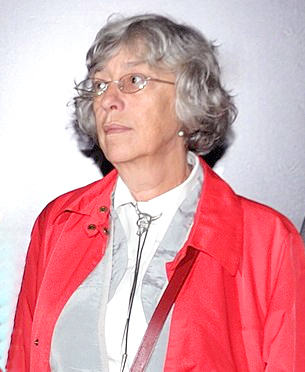
Anémone

- 1 April – Caravelli, French conductor and composer (b. 1930)
- 3 April
  - Jacqueline Lichtenstein, French philosopher and art historian (b. 1946)
  - Gabriel Piroird, French Roman Catholic prelate (b. 1932)
  - Maurice Pon, French lyricist (b. 1921)
- 8 April
  - Gaston Rousseau, French racing cyclist (b. 1925)
  - Turgeon, French racehorse (b. 1986)
- 16 April – Francis Croissant, French archaeologist and art historian (b. 1935)
- 20 April – Enrico Alberto, French-Italian footballer (b. 1933)
- 23 April – Charles Gheerbrant, French politician (b. 1924)
- 24 April
  - Françoise Barrière, French composer (b. 1943)
  - Jean-Pierre Marielle, French actor (b. 1932)
  - Dick Rivers, French rock and roll singer (b. 1945)
- 28 April – Daniel Horlaville, French footballer (b. 1946)
- 29 April – Albert-Marie de Monléon, French Roman Catholic prelate (b. 1937)
- 30 April – Anémone, French actress, filmmaker and political activist (b. 1950)

=== May ===
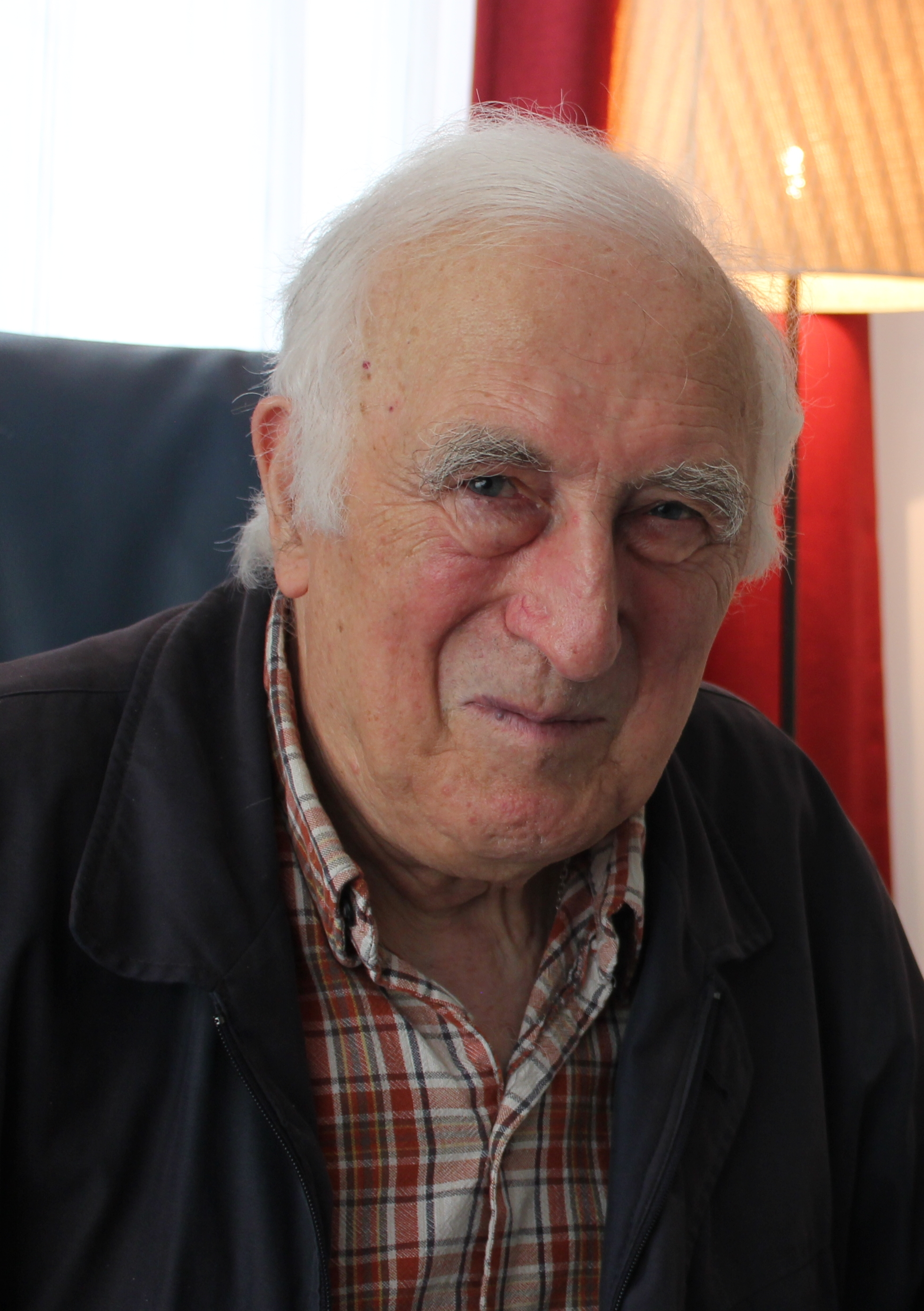
Jean Vanier

- 2 May – Michel Crauste, French rugby player (b. 1934)
- 4 May – Claude Cadart, French sinologist (b. 1927)
- 7 May – Jean Vanier, Canadian Catholic philosopher, theologian and humanitarian (b. 1928)
- 10 May – Geneviève Raugel, French mathematician (b. 1951)
- 11 May – Jean-Claude Brisseau, French film director (b. 1944)
- 14 May – Étienne Perruchon, French composer (b. 1958)
- 16 May
  - André Lurton, French winemaker (b. 1924)
  - Mick Micheyl, French actress, singer and sculptor (b. 1922)
- 22 May – François-René Tranchefort, French musicologist (b. 1933)
- 24 May – Bertrand P. Collomb, French business executive (b. 1942)
- 26 May – Rémi Gazel, French video game composer (b. 1977)
- 28 May – Jean Juventin, French politician (b. 1928)

=== June ===
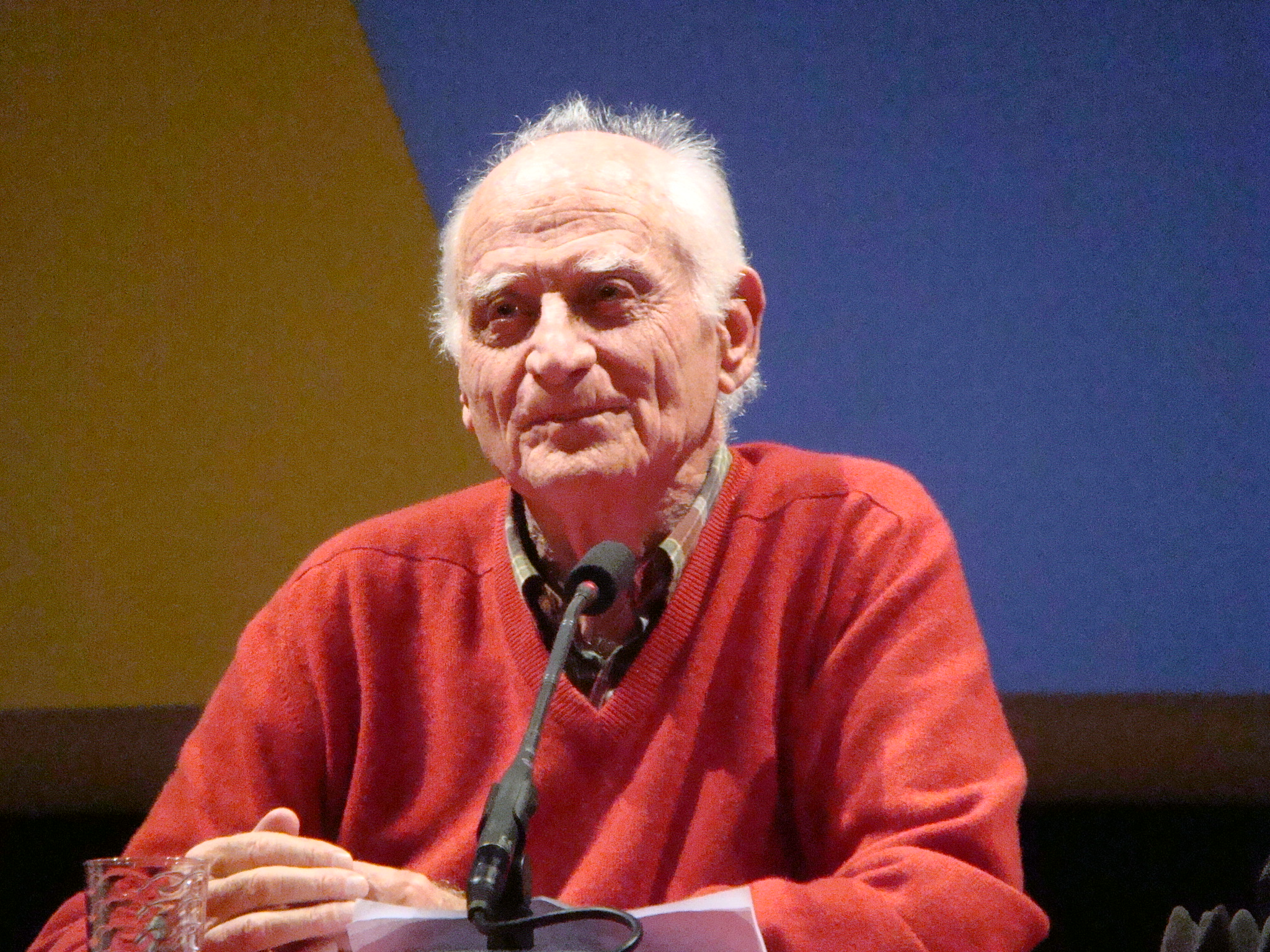
Michel Serres

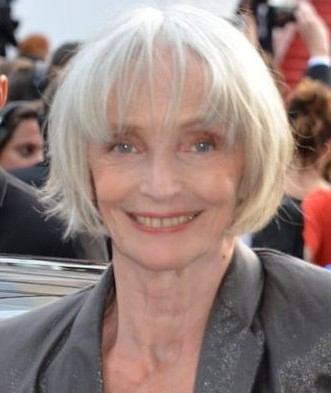
Édith Scob

- 1 June – Michel Serres, French philosopher, theorist and writer (b. 1930)
- 2 June – Yannick Bellon, French film director, editor and screenwriter (b. 1924)
- 9 June – Yves Bot, French magistrate(b. 1947)
- 10 June – Michel Sitjar, French rugby player (b. 1942)
- 14 June
  - Maurice Bénichou, French actor (b. 1943)
  - Roger Béteille, French aeronautical engineer and businessman (b. 1921)
- 15 June – Daniel Colin, French politician (b. 1933)
- 17 June
  - Jean-Marie Hullot, French computer scientist and programmer (b. 1954)
  - Pierre Pardoën, French racing cyclist (b. 1930)
- 18 June – François Doubin, French politician (b. 1933)
- 19 June – Philippe Zdar, French electronic musician and record producer (b. 1968)
- 25 June – Bruno de Keyzer, French cinematographer (b. 1949)
- 26 June
  - Gilberte Marin-Moskovitz, French politician (b. 1937)
  - Édith Scob, French actress (b. 1937)

=== July ===
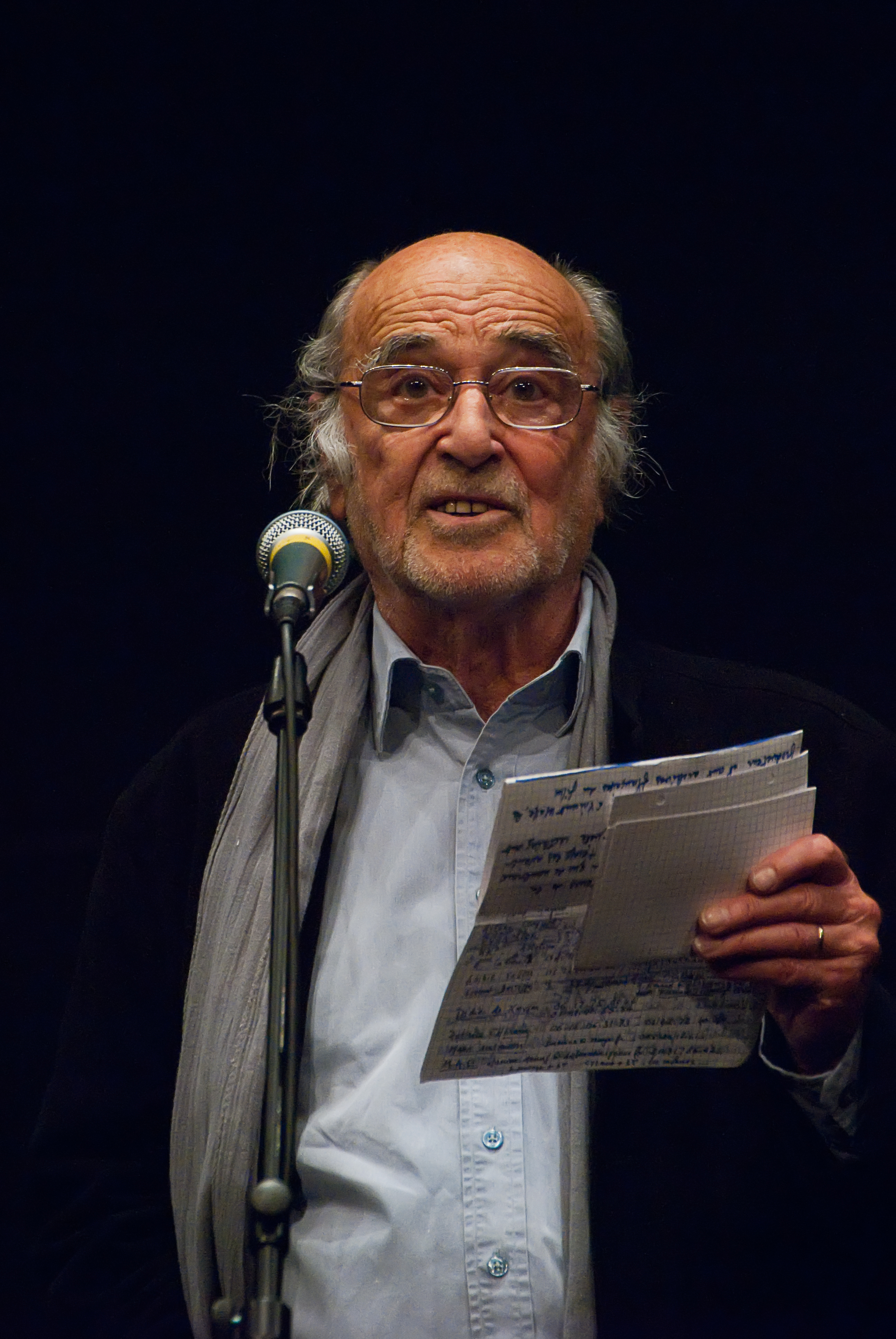
Pierre Lhomme

- 1 July – Pierre Lenhardt, French theologian (b. 1927)
- 2 July – Élie Brousse, French rugby league player (b. 1921)
- 3 July – Raymond Tarcy, French politician (b. 1936)
- 4 July – Pierre Lhomme, French cinematographer (b. 1930)
- 7 July – Patricia Gallerneau, French politician (b. 1954)
- 12 July – Jean-Pierre Worms, French sociologist and politician (b. 1934)
- 18 July – Charles Ceccaldi-Raynaud, French lawyer and politician (b. 1925)
- 21 July – Éric Névé, French film producer (b. 1961)
- 25 July – Pierre Péan, French journalist and author (b. 1938)
- 31 July
  - Marcel Berlins, French legal journalist (b. 1941)
  - Armand Jung, French politician (b. 1950)
  - Jean-Luc Thérier, French rally driver (b. 1945)

=== August ===
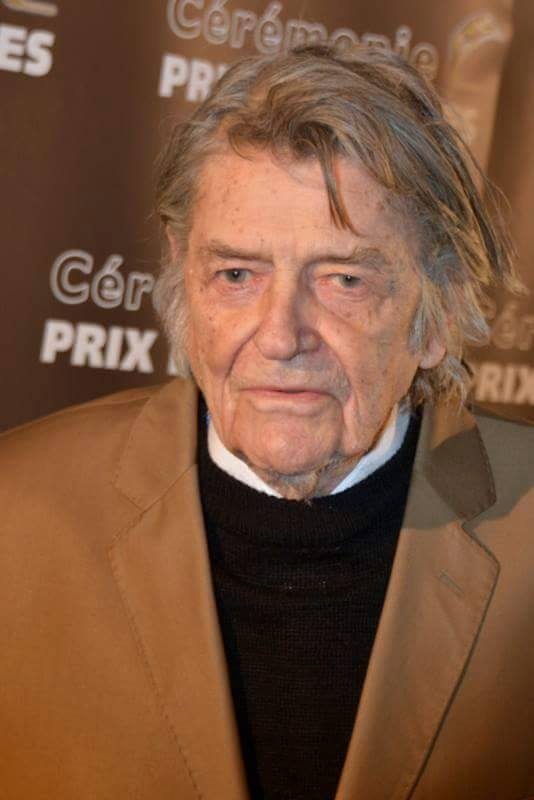
Jean-Pierre Mocky

- 2 August – Schoschana Rabinovici, French-born Lithuanian Holocaust survivor and writer (b. 1932)
- 3 August
  - Henri Belolo, French music producer and songwriter (b. 1936)
  - Jean-Claude Bouttier, French boxer and actor (b. 1944)
- 7 August – Michel Che, French chemist (b. 1941)
- 8 August – Jean-Pierre Mocky, French film director, screenwriter, and producer (b. 1929)
- 13 August – Josette Arène, French Olympic swimmer (b. 1924)
- 19 August – Philippe Leroy, French politician (b. 1940)
- 26 August
  - Pal Benko, French-born Hungarian chess grandmaster (b. 1928)
  - Christian Bonaud, French Islamologist and philosopher (b. 1957)
- 27 August – Philippe Madrelle, American politician (b. 1937)
- 28 August
  - Michel Aumont, French actor (b. 1936)
  - Pascal Gnazzo, French racing cyclist (b. 1920)
- 29 August – Jean Guillou, French Olympic gymnast (b. 1931)
- 31 August – Anthoine Hubert, French professional racing driver (b. 1996)

=== September ===
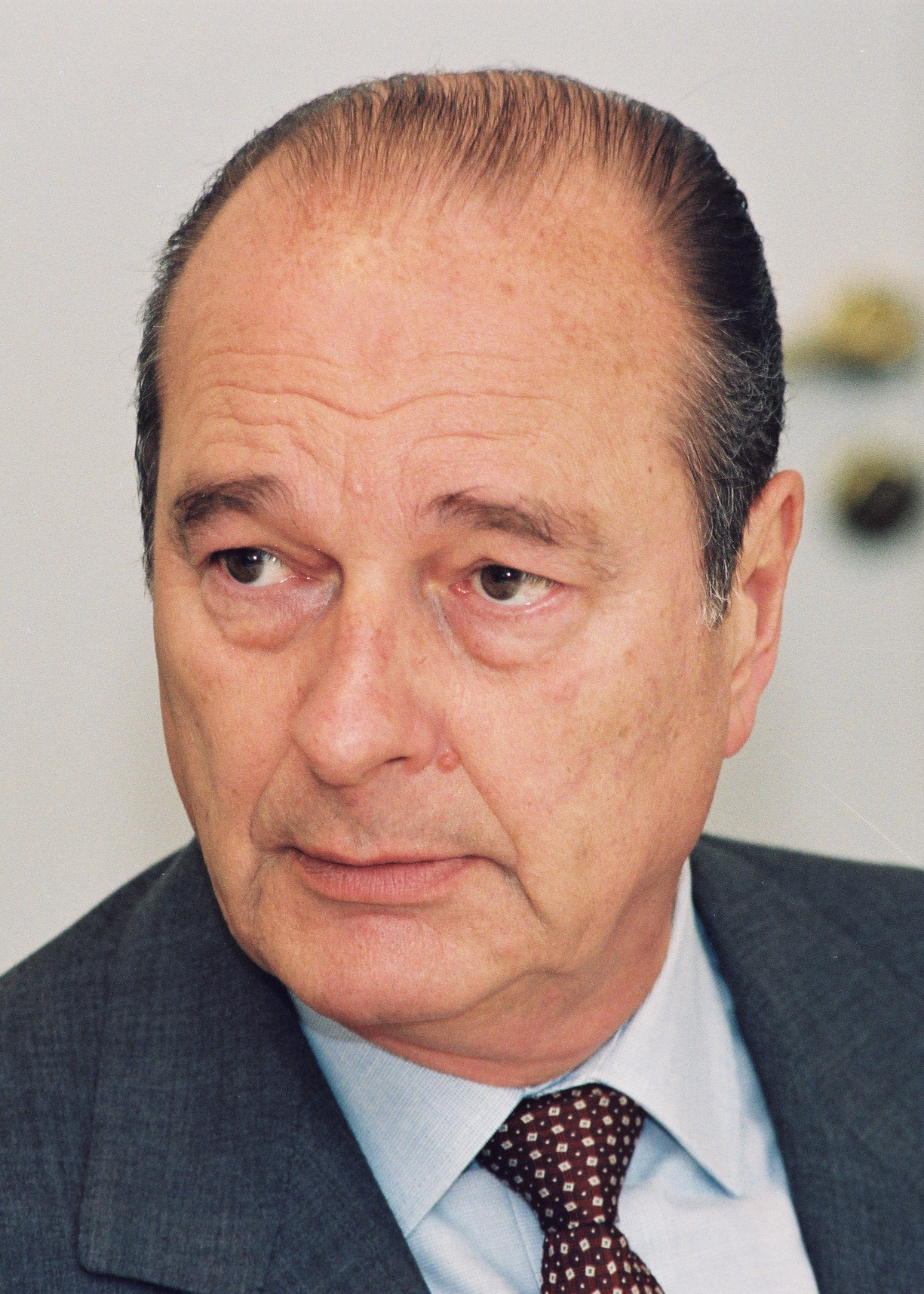
Jacques Chirac

- 3 September – Peter Lindbergh, German fashion photographer and film director (b. 1944)
- 4 September
  - Patrick Dehornoy, French mathematician (b. 1952)
  - Roger Etchegaray, French cardinal (b. 1922)
- 7 September – Roger Boutry, French composer and conductor (b. 2019)
- 8 September – Henri de Contenson, French archaeologist (b. 1926)
- 14 September – Sam Szafran, French artist (b. 1934)
- 15 September – André Jourdain, French politician (b. 1935)
- 19 September – Charles Gérard, French actor and director (b. 1922)
- 26 September – Jacques Chirac, 84th Prime Minister and 22nd President of France (b. 1932)

=== October ===
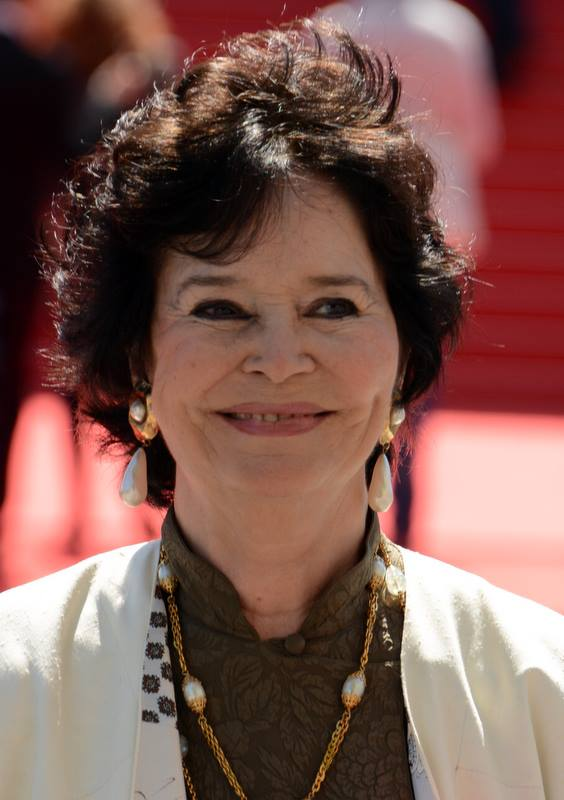
Marie-José Nat

- 3 October – Roger Taillibert, French architect (b. 1926)
- 6 October – Joseph Gourmelon, French politician (b. 1938)
- 8 October – Georgette Elgey, French journalist and historian (b. 1929)
- 9 October
  - Lorand Gaspar, Hungarian–born French poet (b. 1925)
  - Robert Guestier Goelet, French-born American businessman and philanthropist (b. 1923)
  - Louis-Christophe Zaleski-Zamenhof, Polish-French civil engineer and esperantist (b. 1925)
- 10 October – Marie-José Nat, French actress (b. 1940)
- 26 October – Pascale Roberts, French actress (b. 1930)
- 28 October – Annick Alane, French actress (b. 1925)

=== November ===
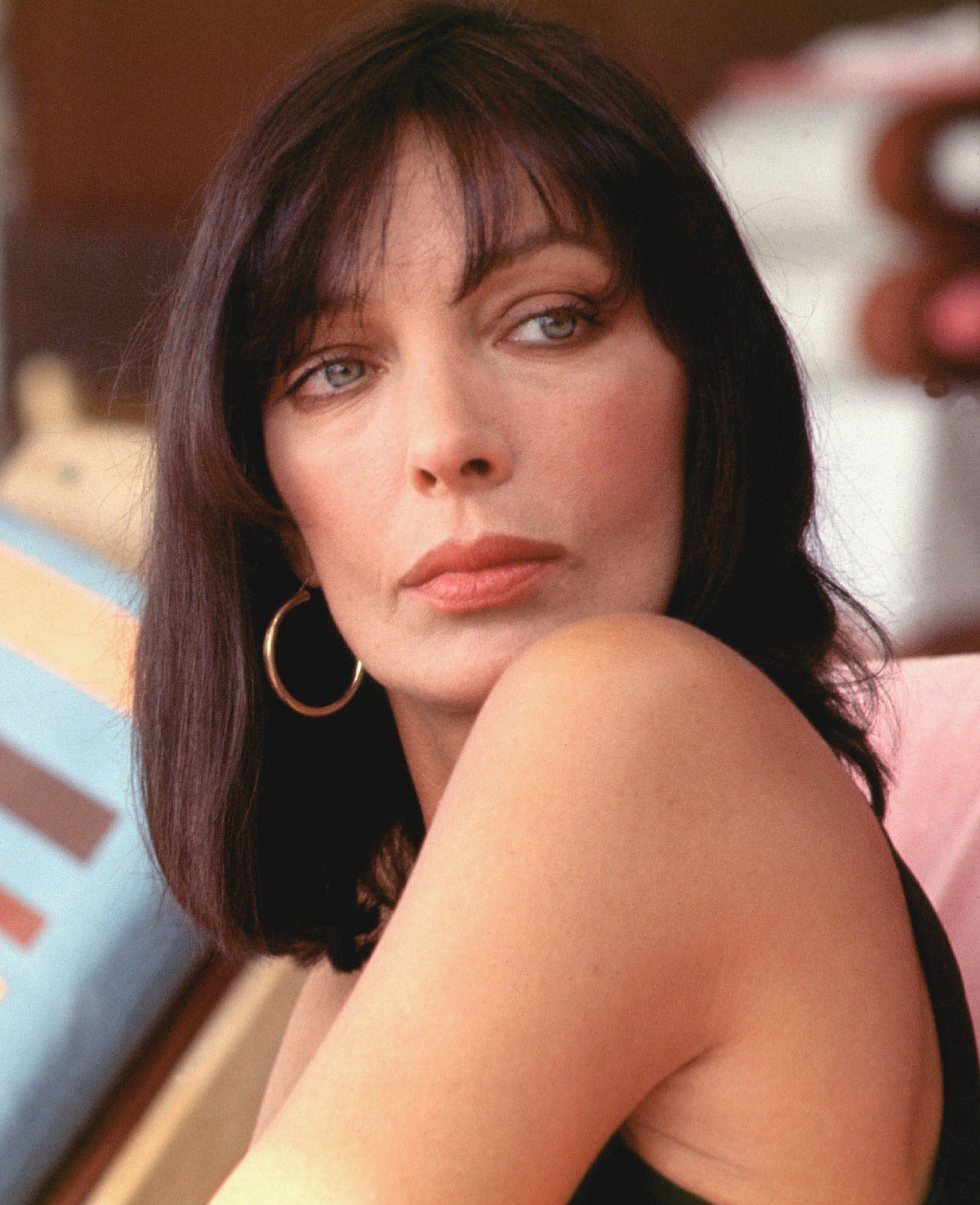
Marie Laforêt

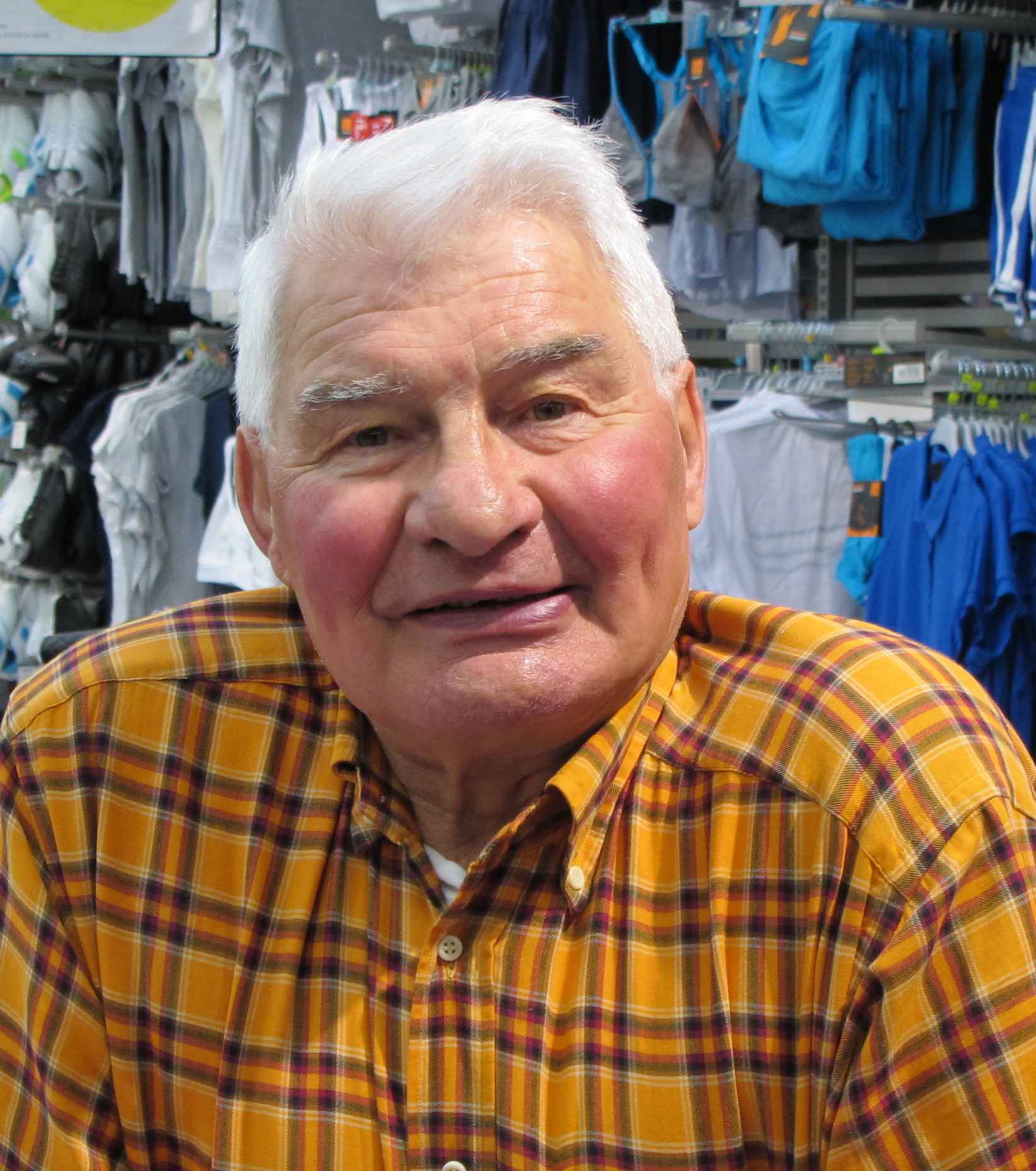
Raymond Poulidor

- 1 November – Pierre Gabaye, composer (b. 1930)
- 2 November – Marie Laforêt, French-Swiss singer and actress (b. 1939)
- 3 November – Yvette Lundy, member of the French Resistance during World War II (b. 1916)
- 4 November – Jacques Dupont, French racing cyclist, Olympic champion (b. 1928)
- 5 November
  - Dominique Farran, French radio host and journalist (b. 1947).
  - André Zimmermann, French racing cyclist, Tour de l'Avenir winner (b. 1939)
- 8 November – Lucette Destouches, ballet dancer and instructor (b. 1912)
- 13 November – Raymond Poulidor, French bicycle racer (b. 1936)
- 21 November – Jean Douchet, French film director, historian, and film critic (b. 1929)

=== December ===
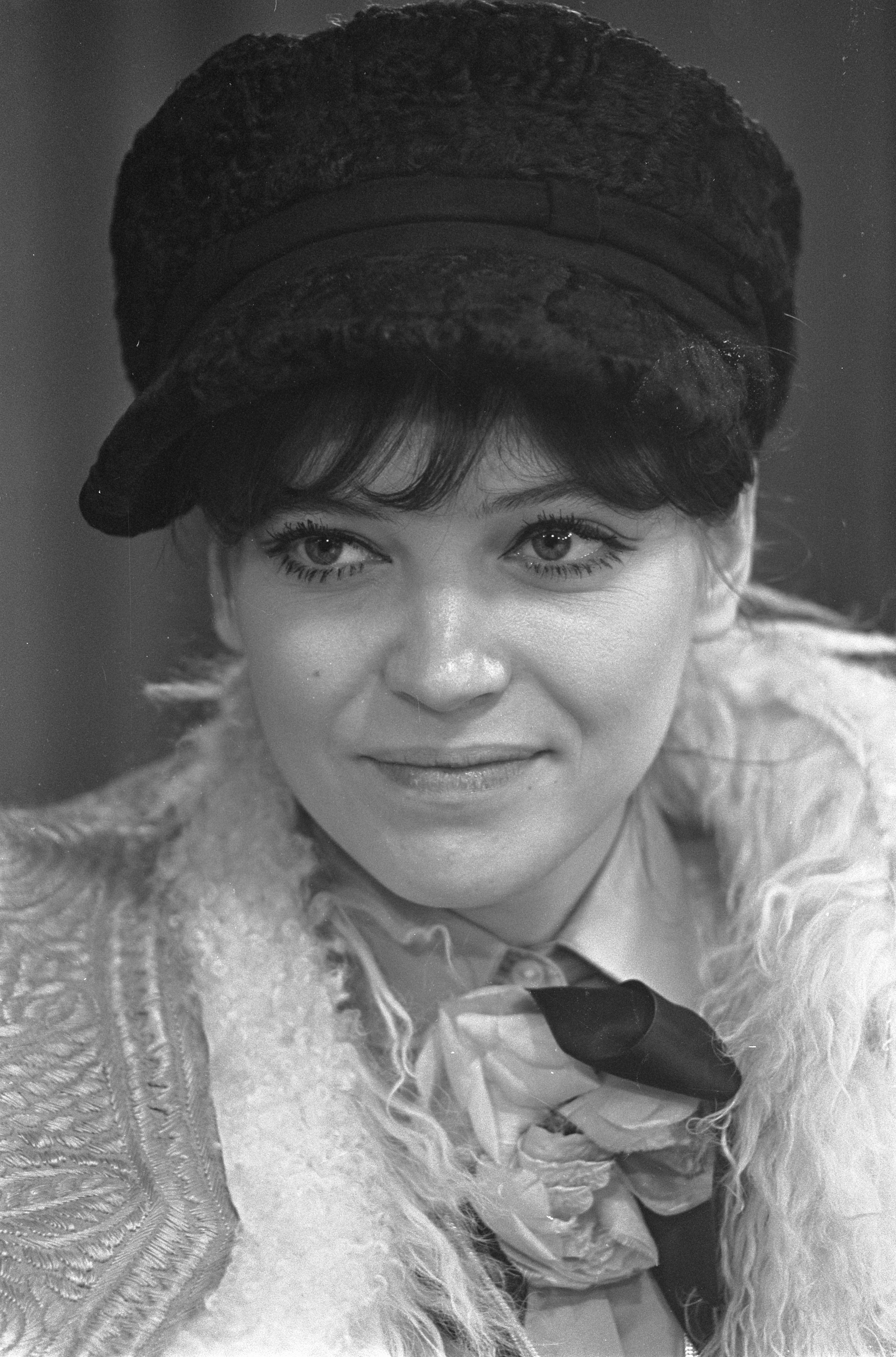
Anna Karina

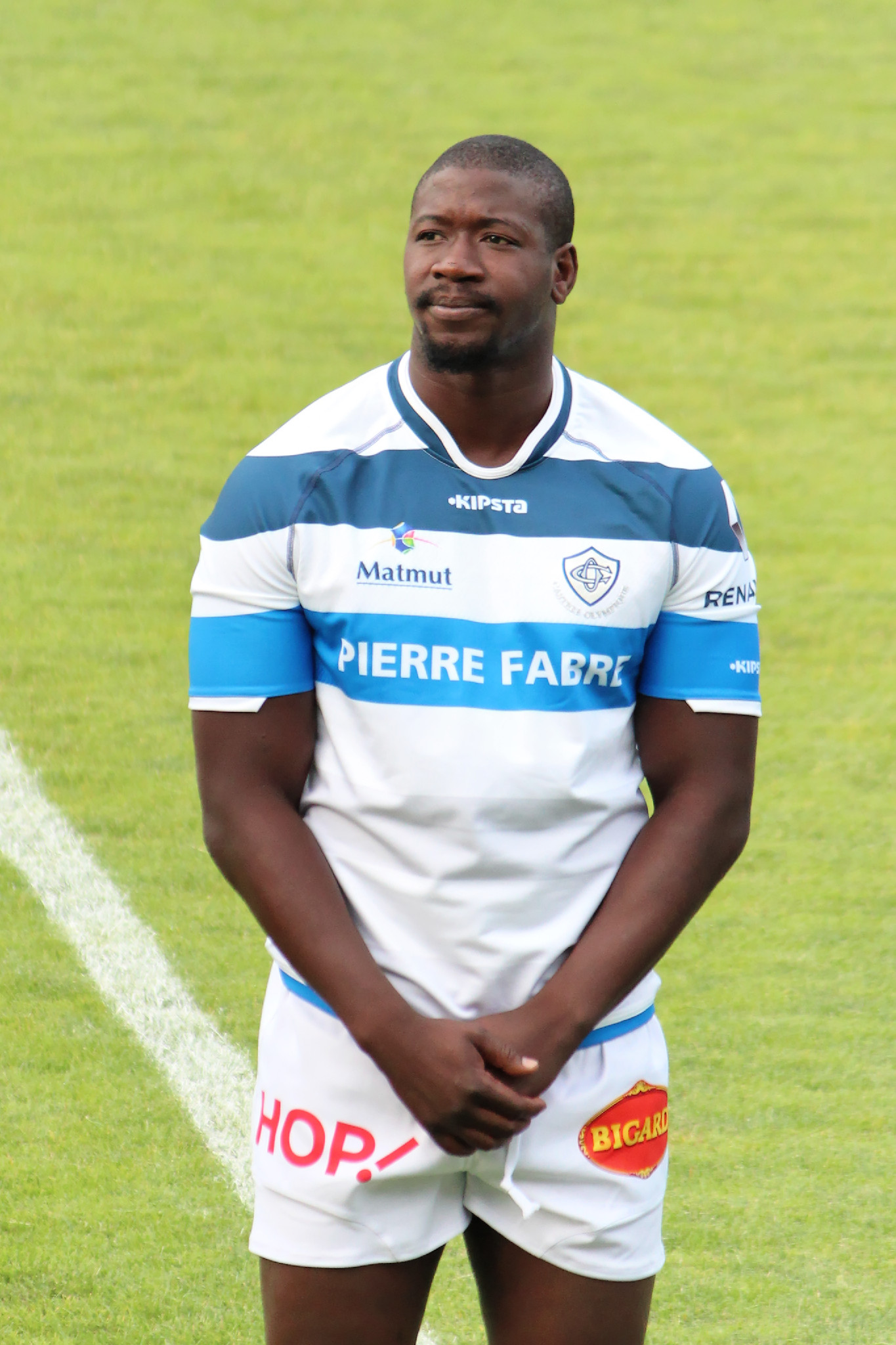
Ibrahim Diarra

- 3 December – André Daguin, 84, French chef, cancer.
- 5 December – Gérard Detourbet, 73, French automotive executive and engineer (Renault), cancer.
- 7 December
  - Denis Lalanne, French sports journalist (b. 1926)
  - Bertrand Landrieu, French politician and prefect (b. 1945)
- 11 December
  - Nicole de Buron, 90, French writer.
  - Guy Laporte, 71, French actor (French Fried Vacation, French Fried Vacation 2), Charcot–Marie–Tooth disease.
- 13 December – Jean-Claude Carle, French politician (b. 1948)
- 14 December
  - Anna Karina, Danish-French film actress, director, writer, and singer (b. 1940)
  - Bernard Lavalette, French actor (b. 1926)
- 15 December
  - Bertrand Lemennicier, French economist (b. 1943)
  - Jean de Viguerie, French historian (b. 1935)
- 16 December – Bernard Lefèvre, French footballer (b. 1930)
- 17 December – Jacques Grimbert, French conductor and choral conductor (b. 1929)
- 18 December
  - Claudine Auger, French actress (b. 1941)
  - Alain Barrière, French singer (b. 1935)
  - Jacques Bravo, French politician (b. 1943)
  - Ibrahim Diarra, French rugby union player (b. 1983)
- 21 December
  - François Autain, French politician (b. 1935)
  - Emanuel Ungaro, French fashion designer (b. 1933)
- 27 December
  - Bernard Lavigne, French rugby union player (b. 1954)
  - Fabien Thiémé, French politician (b. 1952)
- 30 December – Pierre Galet, French ampelographer (b. 1921)

== See also ==
- 2019 European Parliament election in France
- List of French films of 2019
