= Royalist insurrection in the Toulousain (1799) =

The Royalist insurrection in the Toulousain or in the Haute-Garonne was a conflict in August and September 1799 around Toulouse between the French First Republic and French Royalist forces, the latter supported by foreign forces.

== Course ==
40,000 badly-armed royalist insurgents began a massive rebellion aiming to capture Toulouse. They controlled Colomiers and hoped to get into Toulouse by a secondary gate.

After initial success in the battle of Carbonne, the rebellion broke out simultaneously in Saint-Lys, Muret, Montgiscard, Lanta and Caraman on the night of 5-6 August. A Republican response by general Rigaud was beaten back at Castanet and Caraman On the night of 9-10 August, other rebels penetrated to the west of Toulouse into Blagnac, before retreating towards Colomiers.

From his château de Terraqueuse, count Antoine de Paulo for a time held the towns of Calmont, Lanta and Caraman. Nailloux, Montesquieu, and Baziège to the southeast of Toulouse also later briefly fell into Royalist hands. The Royalist forces finally had to retreat before Republican forces advancing from Albi, Lavaur, Castelnaudary and the Ariège. Repulsed from Pech-David in the Garonne, then to l'Isle-Jourdain, they were finally forced to retire towards Spain through the Aran valley. They successfully took the château de la Terrasse near Muret, but ultimately were crushed in a bloodbath at the battle of Montréjeau.

The Comité du souvenir des victimes de la Révolution en Midi toulousain was founded in 2018 to hold an annual commemoration at Montréjeau. Its patron is prince Louis de Bourbon ('Louis XX') and it is financially backed by major figures such as Jean de Viguerie, Jean Raspail, Reynald Secher, Philippe Pichot-Bravard and colonel Jacques Hogard.

== Bibliography (in French) ==
- Dom Claude de Vic, Dom Vaissete and Alexandre Louis C.A. Du Mège, Histoire générale de Languedoc, vol. X, J.-B. Paya, 1846, p. 789-790.
- Christine Dousset, 1799. Les royalistes en échec, Éditions midi-pyrénéennes, 2019.
