= Roger Bastié =

French rugby player and coach (1932–2019)

- Born: 21 September 1932; Sallèles-d'Aude, France
- Died: 3 January 2019 (aged 86); Brive-la-Gaillarde, France
- Occupations: Rugby coach and player

Roger Bastié (French pronunciation: [ʁɔʒe bastje]; 21 September 1932 – 3 January 2019) was a French rugby coach and player, best known for his association with CA Brive.

== Biography ==
Bastié was born in Sallèles-d'Aude.

As a player, Bastié played the centre and winger positions. He played for RC Narbonne, Bort-les-Orgues, RC Vichy, and CA Brive. He won a French rugby championship with CA Brive in 1957. After his retirement as a player, he coached CA Brive, Sarlat, Union Sportive Objatoise, and SC Tulle. In 1967 he made the French rugby championship quarterfinal before losing to US Montauban. He was the recipient of the 1972 Bouclier d'automne. In 1972, Bastié coached CA Brive to the French rugby championship game before losing 9–0 to AS Béziers Hérault.

Bastié died at Brive-la-Gaillarde on 3 January 2019 following a long illness.
