= Maurice Pon =

French lyricist (1921–2019)

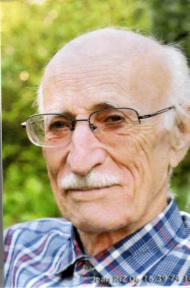
Pon in 2011

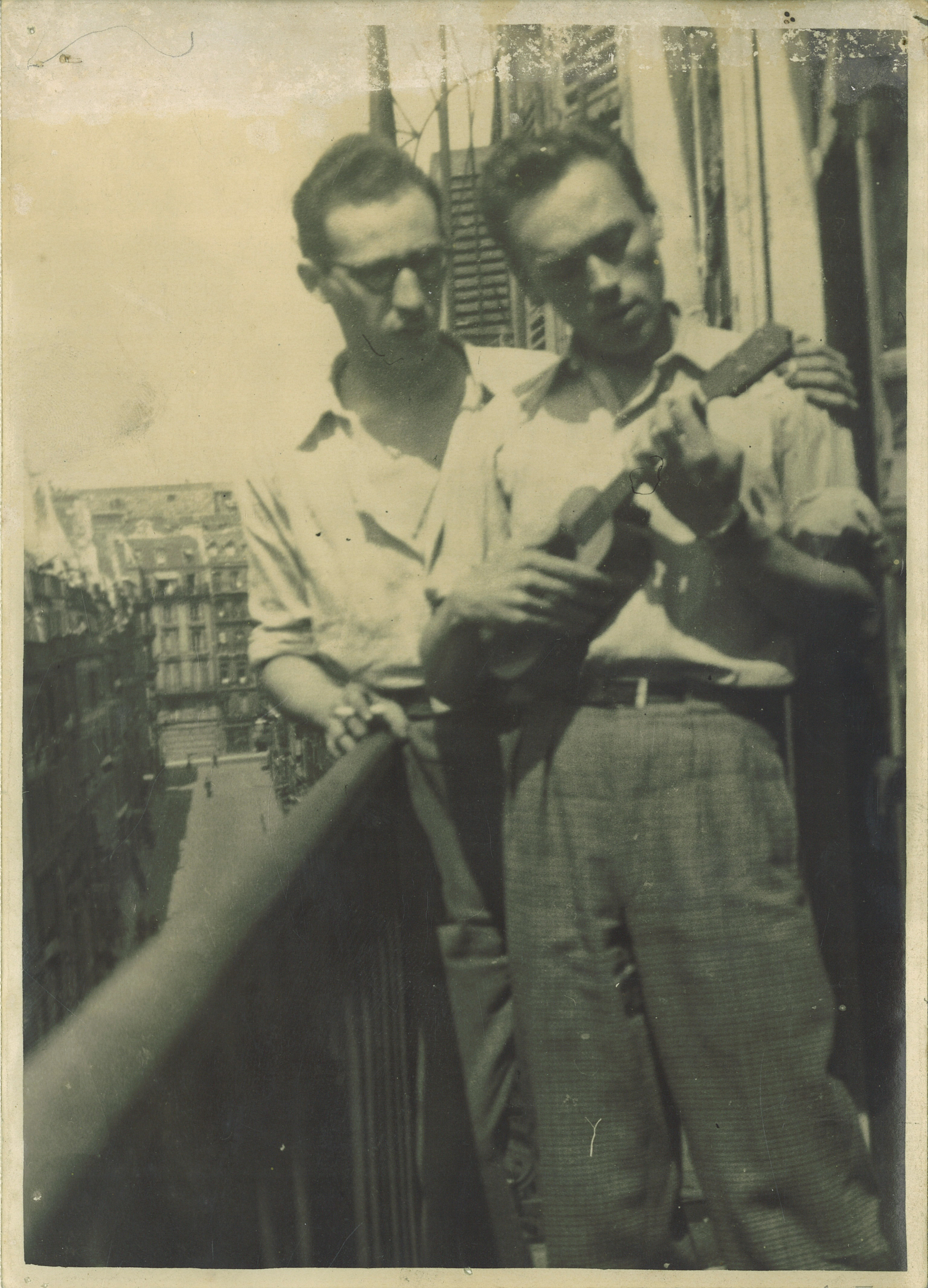
Maurice Pon (left) with Bernard Michel.

Maurice Marie Jean Pon (26 October 1921 in Bordeaux – 3 April 2019) was a French lyricist who mainly worked with Henri Salvador.

In 1949, Pon wrote the lyrics of "Le Loup, la Biche et le Chevalier". With Salvador, Pon also wrote "Le travail c’est la santé" and other well-known French songs. He also wrote for Bourvil, Fernandel, Jean Sablon, André Claveau and Les Frères Jacques.

Pon died in Île-de-France, at the age of 97.

== Bibliography ==
- Maurice Pon, Ma Chanson douce avec Henri Salvador. Souvenirs d’un homme de paroles, Mustang éditions, 2011 ISBN 9782953572711
