= Francis Croissant =

French archaeologist and art historian (1935–2019)

Francis Croissant (1935 – April 16, 2019) was a French archaeologist and art historian specializing in Archaic Greece, especially sculpture.

A student at the École normale supérieure (class 1957 L), he has been a member of the French School at Athens and former general secretary of this institution (1968–1974).

He was a maître de conférences at the University of Nancy, and later a professor of Greek archaeology at Paris I.

== Selected bibliography ==
- Les Protomés féminines archaïques : recherches sur les représentations du visage dans la plastique grecque de 550 a 480 av. J.-C. ("Bibliothèque des Écoles françaises d'Athènes et de Rome", 250), Paris : De Boccard, 1983.
- Fouilles de Delphes / École française d'Athènes. Tome IV, Monuments figurés : sculpture. 7, Les frontons du temple du IVe siècle, Paris : De Boccard, 2003. ISBN 978-2-86958-173-9.
