= Aline Kiner =

French journalist and novelist (1959–2019)

- Born: 18 June 1959; Moyeuvre-Petite, France
- Died: 7 January 2019 (aged 59); Paris, France
- Occupation: Journalist

Aline Kiner (18 June 1959 – 7 January 2019) was a French journalist and novelist.

== Biography ==
Kiner began as a journalist for Sciences et Avenir in 1995, and was then named editor-in-chief of special issues in 2008. She also collaborated with the French documentary series Thalassa, and for the French newspaper Libération.

She wrote four books and novels, including La nuit des béguines, which won the Prix Culture et Bibliothèques pour tous in 2018.

== Works ==
- La cathédrale, livre de pierre, Presses de la Renaissance, 2004
- Le jeu du pendu, Liana Levi, 2011
- La vie sur le fil, Liana Levi, 2014
- La nuit des béguines, Liana Levi, 2017
