= Françoise Barrière =

French editor, writer and composer (1944–2019)

Françoise Barrière (12 June 1944 – 24 April 2019) was a French composer, editor, and writer.

== Life ==
Françoise Barrière was born in Paris and studied at the Conservatoire de Versailles and the Conservatoire National Supérieur de Musique in Paris. She continued her studies in ethnomusicology at the Ecole Pratique de Hautes Etudes. Barrière worked at the Service de la Recherche, ORTF, and in 1970 became co-founder and director of the International Institute of Electroacoustic Music of Bourges with Christian Clozier.

Barrière was instrumental in organizing the Bourges International Competitions at the Synthese Festival. She managed the magazine Faire and the Mnémosyne Musique Media company which published the annual works of the International Academy of Electroacoustic Music and the Cultures Electroniques and Chrysopée Electronique CDs.

Barrière was a founder of the International Confederation of Electroacoustic Music (ICEM) and served as its president beginning in 2005. Her works have been played internationally at concerts and festivals and through radio broadcasts.

Barriere died in 2019 at the age of 74.

== Discography ==
Barrière composed electroacoustic music and blended electroacoustic and instrumental music. Selected works include:

- Françoise Barrière / Christian Clozier - Cordes-Ci, Cordes-Ça / La Discordatura (LP, Album) Pathé Marconi EMI 1972
- Christian Clozier / Françoise Barrière - Ritratto Di Giovane / Symphonie Pour Un Enfant Seul (3xLP) Not On Label 1976
- Par Temps Calme Et Ensoleillé (CD, Album) Le Chant Du Monde 1992
- Scènes Des Voyages D'Ulysse (CD, Album) IMEB 1999
