= Bertrand Landrieu =

French politician and prefect (1945–2019)

Cabinet Director for Sarthe
- In office 1974–1977
- Preceded by: Lucien Chabason
- Succeeded by: Paul Masseron

Subprefect of Ussel
- In office 1977–1978

Cabinet Director of Bas-Rhin
- In office 1981–1984

Prefect of Savoie
- In office 1 October 1987 – 25 June 1990
- Preceded by: Jean-Louis Dufeigneux
- Succeeded by: Jacques Lambert

Prefect of Manche
- In office 25 June 1990 – 24 June 1993
- Preceded by: Jean-Jacques Pascal
- Succeeded by: Gilles Kilian

Prefect of Haute-Vienne
- In office 24 June 1993 – 1 June 1995
- Preceded by: Jean Mingasson
- Succeeded by: Jean Anciaux

Cabinet Director of the President of France
- In office 19 May 1995 – 31 July 2002
- Preceded by: Pierre Chassigneux
- Succeeded by: Michel Blangy

Prefect of Paris
- In office 29 July 2002 – 25 May 2007
- Preceded by: Jean-Pierre Duport
- Succeeded by: Pierre Mutz

Personal details
- Born: 9 February 1945 Paris, France
- Died: 7 December 2019 (aged 74)
- Occupation: Politician

Bertrand Landrieu (9 February 1945 – 7 December 2019) was a French politician and prefect.

== Biography ==
Landrieu was the son of a doctor. After obtaining a master's degree in public law, he attended Sciences Po, and then the École nationale d'administration. He first got a job as an administrator at the French Ministry of the Interior.

Landrieu spent most of his career as a prefect, after spending the early part of his career as a cabinet minister.

In 1971, he became prefect of Sarthe, and in 1973 joined the Ministry of Agriculture. From 1974 to 1977, Landrieu served as subprefect of Ussel.

A close friend of Jacques Chirac, Landrieu served as Chirac's chief of staff from 1995 to 2002. Simultaneously, he was President of the National Forests Office. Then, in July 2002, he was appointed prefect of Île-de-France and Paris. In this time, he was also President of Île-de-France Mobilités.

After Landrieu retired from his life as a prefect, he served on Chirac's staff until March 2012, when he retired from public life.

Landrieu helped with François Fillon's campaign in Paris's 2nd constituency.

Bertrand Landrieu died on 7 December 2019.
