= Denis Lalanne =

French sports journalist (1926–2019)

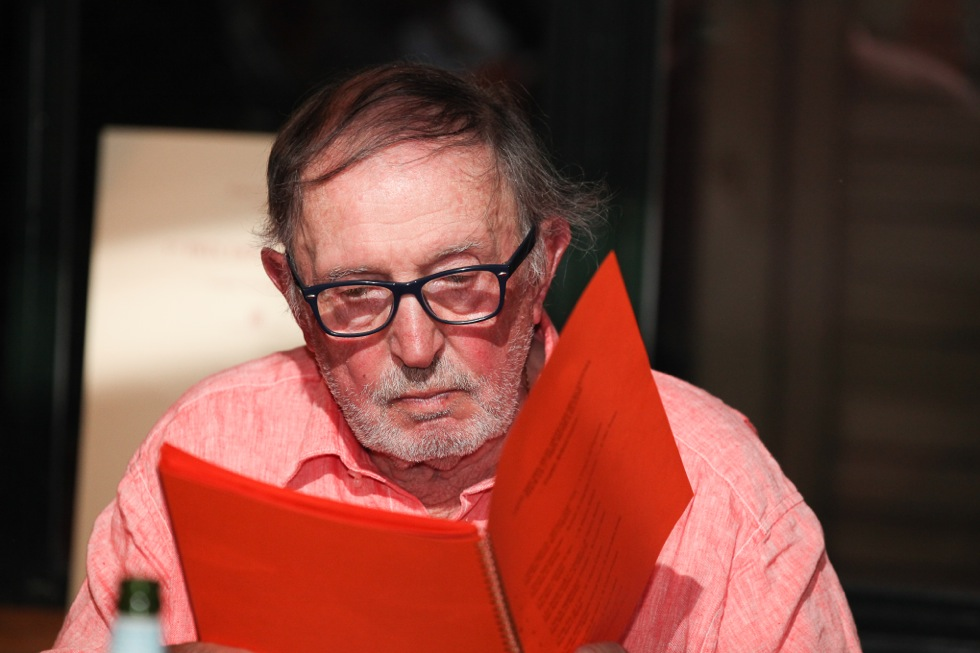
- Denis Lalanne
- Born: 1 April 1926; Pau, France
- Died: 7 December 2019 (aged 93); Anglet, France
- Occupation: Sports journalist
- Years active: 1955–2019

Denis Lalanne (1 April 1926 – 7 December 2019) was a French sports journalist who specialized in tennis, rugby union, and golf.

== Biography ==
As an adolescent, Lalanne attended boarding school in Seine-et-Oise, where he befriended Michel Bouquet. He then wrote for L'Équipe, a French daily sports newspaper. In this time period, he wrote several books on rugby, including Le grand combat du XV de France and La peau des Springboks.

In 1978, Lalanne led the commentary for the France-Scotland rugby match with Georges de Caunes, and the French Open.

His book Le grand combat du XV de France was adapted into a documentary film in 2006 by Serge Tignères and Étienne Bellan Huchery. A limited edition box set was released by the French Rugby Federation.

In 2011, Lalanne founded the Festival Singe-Germain in Saint-Germain-des-Prés with Jean Cormier, a sports and cultural festival.

Novels written by Lalanne include Un long dimanche à la campagne and Le devoir de français, the latter of which was adapted into a film.

He still had a weekly column for Midi olympique until his death.

In 2012, an award in Lalanne's name was founded by the French Tennis Federation called the Prix Denis-Lalanne. The prize is given to the best French-language article written during the French Open.

In April 2019, Lalanne published his last novel, Dieu ramasse les copies.

Denis Lalanne died in his home in Anglet, France on 7 December 2019.

== Works ==
- Jean Borotra - Roger Courtois - Jean et Maurice Prat (1955)
- La mêlée fantastique (1961)
- Le Grand Combat du Quinze de France (1962)
- Le Tennis (1963)
- Les Coquelicots de Cardiff (1965)
- La Girouette en deuil (1968)
- Géants du Rugby (1970)
- Les conquérants du XV de France (1970)
- Les nouveaux géants du rugby (1974)
- Dauga (Podium) (1975)
- Grand Chelem (1977)
- Nous reviendrons à Eden Park : le fabuleux roman de la Coupe du monde de rugby 1987 (1987)
- Golf 1987 : le roman de l'année (1987)
- Le grand combat du XV de France (1993)
- Un long dimanche à la campagne (1995)
- Le temps des Boni (2002)
- Rue du bac : Salut aux années Blondin (2002)
- Une table chez Romanoff (2003)
- Élissalde de pères en fils (2006)
- Dicovale : Le dico non officiel du rugby (2007)
- La peau des Springboks (2007)
- Chronique Coupe du Monde de Rugby 2007 (2007)
- Bergougnan : Un génie du rugby (2008)
- Le rugby est ma patrie (2009)
- Trois balles dans la peau (2011)
- Allez les gazelles (2012)
- Lignes d'avant(s) et lignes d'arrivée (2015)
- La Famille Rugby (2015)
- Rugbymania : French flair attitude (2016)
- Dieu ramasse les copies (2019)
