= Geneviève Raugel =

French mathematician (1951–2019)

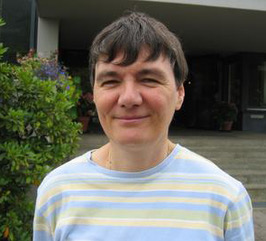
- Raugel in 2004
- Born: May 27, 1951
- Died: May 10, 2019 (aged 67)
- Education: École normale supérieure de Fontenay-aux-Roses; University of Rennes 1(PhD and State doctorate)
- Alma mater: Université Rennes I
- Known for: Bernardi-Fortin-Raugel element Attractors; Navier-Stokes equations
- Scientific career
- Fields: Numerical Analysis and Dynamical systems
- Workplaces: Centre national de la recherche scientifique University of Rennes 1 École Polytechnique; University of Paris-Sud
- Thesis: Résolution numérique de problèmes elliptiques dans des domaines avec coins (1978)
- Doctoral advisor: Michel Crouzeix

Geneviève Raugel (27 May 1951 – 10 May 2019) was a French mathematician working in the field of numerical analysis and dynamical systems.

== Biography ==
Raugel entered the École normale supérieure de Fontenay-aux-Roses in 1972, obtaining the agrégation in mathematics in 1976. She earned her Ph.D degree from University of Rennes 1 in 1978 with a thesis entitled Résolution numérique de problèmes elliptiques dans des domaines avec coins (Numerical resolution of elliptic problems in domains with edges).

Raugel got a tenured position in the CNRS the same year, first as a researcher (1978–1994) then as a research director (exceptional class from 2014 on). Beginning in 1989, she worked at the Orsay Math Lab of CNRS affiliated to the University of Paris-Sud since 1989.

Raugel also held visiting professor positions in several international institutions: the University of California, Berkeley (1986–1987), Caltech (1991), the Fields Institute (1993), University of Hamburg (1994–95), and the University of Lausanne (2006). She delivered the Hale Memorial Lectures in 2013, at the first international conference on the dynamic of differential equations, Atlanta.

She co-directed the international Journal of Dynamics and Differential Equations from 2005 on.

== Research ==
Raugel's first research works were devoted to numerical analysis, in particular finite element discretization of partial differential equations. With Christine Bernardi, she studied a finite element for the Stokes problem, now known as the Bernardi-Fortin-Raugel element. She was also interested in problems of bifurcation, showing for instance how to use invariance properties of the dihedral group in these questions.

In the mid-1980s, she started working on the dynamics of evolution equations, in particular on global attractors, perturbation theory, and the Navier-Stokes equations in thin domains. In the last topic she was recognized as a world expert.

== Selected publications ==
- with Christine Bernardi, Approximation numérique de certaines équations paraboliques non linéaires, RAIRO Anal. Numér. 18, 1984–3, 237–285.
- with Jack Hale: Reaction-diffusion equation on thin domains, Journal de mathématiques pures et appliquées 71, 1992, 33–95.
- with Jack Hale: Convergence in gradient-like systems with applications to PDE, Z. Angew. Math. Phys. 43, 1992, 63–124.
- Dynamics of Partial Differential Equations on Thin Domains, in: R. Johnson (ed.), Dynamical systems. Lectures given at the Second C.I.M.E. (Montecatini Terme, Juni 1994), Lecture Notes in Mathematics 1609, Springer 1995, S. 208–315
- with Jerrold Marsden, Tudor Ratiu: The Euler equations on thin domains, International Conference on Differential Equations (Berlin, 1999), World Scientific, 2000, 1198–1203
- with Klaus Kirchgässner: Stability of Fronts for a KPP-system: The noncritical case, in: Gerhard Dangelmayr, Bernold Fiedler, Klaus Kirchgässner, Alexander Mielke (eds.), Dynamics of nonlinear waves in dissipative systems: reduction, bifurcation and stability, Longman, Harlow 1996, 147–209; part 2 (The critical case): J. Differential Equations, 146, 1998, S. 399–456.
- Global Attractors in Partial Differential Equations, Handbook of Dynamical Systems, Elsevier, 2002, p. 885–982.
- with Jack Hale: Regularity, determining modes and Galerkin methods, J. Math. Pures Appl., 82, 2003, 1075–1136.
- with Romain Joly: A striking correspondence between the dynamics generated by the vector fields and by the scalar parabolic equations, Confluentes Math., 3, 2011, 471–493, Arxiv
- with Marcus Paicu: Anisotropic Navier-Stokes equations in a bounded cylindrical domain, in: Partial differential equations and fluid mechanics, London Math. Soc. Lecture Note Ser., 364, Cambridge Univ. Press, 2009, 146–184, Arxiv
- with Romain Joly: Generic Morse-Smale property for the parabolic equation on the circle, Transactions of the AMS, 362, 2010, 5189–5211, Arxiv
- with Jack Hale: Persistence of periodic orbits for perturbed dissipative dynamical systems, in: Infinite dimensional dynamical systems, Fields Institute Commun., 64, Springer, New York, 2013, 1–55.
