= Jacqueline Lichtenstein =

French philosopher (1947–2019)

Dr. Jacqueline Lichtenstein
- Born: Jacqueline Lenke Lichtenstein; 18 March 1947; Paris, France
- Died: 2 April 2019 (aged 72); Paris, France
- Education: Doctorate in philosophy
- Occupations: Art Historian, Philosopher
- Employer(s): University of California, Berkeley University of Paris-Nanterre University of Paris-Sorbonne Ècole du Louvre
- Notable work: La couleur éloquente, rhétorique et peinture à l'âge classique

Jacqueline Lichtenstein (18 March 1947 – 3 April 2019) was a French philosopher, art historian, and professor of aesthetics and the philosophy of art at the University of Paris IV - Paris-Sorbonne.

Her work focused on 17th-century and 18th-century art, and the ways in which people think, talk, and theorize about art. Another theme of her work was the shift, since the 17th century, in how people think about the amateur.

== Career ==
Before her career at the University of California at Berkeley, Lichtenstein taught philosophy at a secondary level between 1972 and 1984. Between 1984 and 1991, she was first an assistant professor and later associate Professor at UC Berkeley. Her tenure in Paris started 1991 at the University of Paris X-Nanterre and later at the University of Paris IV-Sorbonne. During Lichtenstein's career, she published numerous articles in French and American journals.

She was the joint director of a philosophy and sociology training and research unit at University Paris IV-Sorbonne, where she coordinated a master's program in aesthetics and philosophy of art. She was also in charge of the series "Essays on art and philosophy" (Aesthetics and philosophy of art), founded by Henri Gouhier in 1949 and published by Editions Vrin.

== The eloquence of color ==
A central theme of Lichtenstein's work is the reception of color by various disciplines, such as philosophy, art, sociology, and ethics. A focal point for her analysis was the antagonistic relationship between color and the notion of the design or plan of a work (in 17th-century French, the dessein of the work, etymologically related to dessin, drawing).

Philosophically suspect due to its material character, morally culpable because of its seductive luster, color, in Lichtenstein's view, has long been deemed aesthetically dangerous, the source of a pleasure and a beauty that does not, at first blush, seem connected with the True and the Good. This is, she argued, one aspect of an ongoing conflict between reason and the universe of sensible forms. Painting not being reducible to drawing, it is a source of disunity and disorder in our systems of knowledge, one which elicits an experience of "lack" (insuffisance).

The history of this conflict, she argued, begins in Platonic thought, which condemns color and rhetoric equally. The arts of speech and those of imagery are thus definitively linked. A central later figure is Roger de Piles, the leader of the Rubenists, the partisans of color (coloris). The Rubenists broke with the Platonic tradition and defended illusion, makeup, and seduction. They shifted, Lichtenstein maintained, the focus to those feminine aspects of representation, that is the suspected and cursed elements. They made these the essence of painting.

From that point onward, painting was linked with the linguistically inexpressible. Only the gaze may be spoken of, not the picture itself. This, argued Lichtenstein, was the birth of aesthetics, in the sense that the word was to take on in the 17th century.

== Publications ==
- La couleur éloquente, rhétorique et peinture à l'âge classique, Flammarion, Paris, 1989.
- La tâche aveugle : Essai sur les relations de la peinture et de la sculpture à l'âge moderne, NRF Essais, Paris, 2003.
- Les raisons de l'Art. Essai sur les théories de la peinture. NRF Essais, Paris, 2014

=== Collected works ===
- La peinture, Larousse, Paris, 1995.
- Tadanori Yokoo, co-authored with Daido Moriyama and Takayo Iida, Actes Sud, 2006.
- Conférences de l'Académie royale de Peinture et de Sculpture : tome 1, volume 1, Les Conférences au temps d'Henry Testelin 1648-1681, ENSBA, Paris, 2007.
- Conférences de l'Académie royale de Peinture et de Sculpture : tome 1, volume 2 : 1648-1681, ENSBA, Paris, 2007.

=== Co-Authored ===
- Winckelmann & l'œuvre d'art, Institut national d'histoire de l'art, Paris, 2021

== Awards and Honors ==
Jacqueline Lichtenstein was awarded the "Prix Gegner" ("Gegner Price") in 2014 for her book Les raisons de l'Art. Essai sur les théories de la peinture.

In 2021, the Institut National d'Histoire de l'Art voted on proposed names for their newly renovated auditorium. Over 85% of votes agreed on the name "l'auditorium Jacqueline Lichtenstein" ("the Jacqueline Lichtenstein auditorium").
