= Anne-Marie Minvielle =

French journalist (1943–2019)

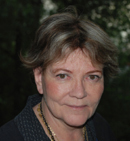
- Born: 16 September 1943; Paris, France
- Died: 3 January 2019 (aged 75)
- Occupation: Journalist

Anne-Marie Minvielle (16 September 1943 – 3 January 2019) was a French journalist.

== Biography ==
Minvielle started her career as a tour guide in the Pyrenees Mountains and numerous French national parks. After working for the Ministry of Culture as a photographer, she became a journalist in 1980.

Minvielle wrote tourism reports for France, Spain, Ireland, Italy, Norway, Sweden, Great Britain, Croatia, Austria, Cyprus, Finland, and Russia. She became editor-in-chief of Randonnée Magazine in 1982, and was a freelancer for Pyrénées-Magazine, Alpes-Magazine, Alpinisme et Randonnée, L’Ami des Jardins, Le Monde, GEO, Marche-Magazine, and Détours en France. She was also a correspondent of the Fédération Française de la Randonnée Pédestre (French Federation of Hiking). In this position, she wrote many hiking guides for the Green belt, Hauts-de-Seine, Yvelines, Yonne, Seine-et-Marne, Basque Country, Béarn, Seine-Saint-Denis, Essonne, Val-de-Marne, and Val-d’Oise.

She was a member of the World Federation of Travel Journalists and Writers (FIJET), the Association des Journalistes du Jardin et de l'Horticulture (AJJH), and the Union des photographes créateurs (UPC).

== Awards ==
- Malta Tourism Press Award (2011)
- Prize of the French Association of Journalists and Tourism Writers (2011)
