= Maurice Hardouin =

French footballer (1947–2019)

Personal information
- Date of birth: 7 July 1947
- Place of birth: Nouzonville, France
- Date of death: 30 March 2019 (aged 71)
- Position: Striker

Senior career*
Years	Team	Apps	(Gls)
- RC Nouzonville
1968–1971	Sedan	83	(13)
1971–1974	Strasbourg	23	(8)
1972–1973	→ Valenciennes (loan)	6	(3)
1974–1979	Le Mans		
Total		112	(24)
- * Club domestic league appearances and goals

Maurice Hardouin (7 July 1947 – 30 March 2019) was a French professional footballer who played as a striker.

== Career ==
Born in Nouzonville, Hardouin played for RC Nouzonville, Sedan, Strasbourg, Valenciennes and Le Mans.
