= 2019 Bayonne mosque shooting =

Mosque attack in Bayonne, France

Bayonne mosque shooting
- Location: 43.50362°N 1.44214°W; Bayonne, Pyrénées-Atlantiques, France
- Date: 28 October 2019
- Target: Muslims
- Attack type: Shooting, failed arson
- Weapon: Handgun
- Deaths: 0
- Injuries: 2
- Perpetrator: Claude Sinké
- Motive: Islamophobia

On 28 October 2019, a shooting took place at a mosque in Bayonne, Pyrénées-Atlantiques, France. An 84-year-old man seriously injured two people by gunfire. The police arrested the suspect. He is said to have taken part in the 2015 regional elections as a candidate for the far-right Front National (today the Rassemblement National).

According to the French police, the man is said to have tried to lay a kind of incendiary in front of the mosque at around 15:20 local time. He was disturbed by two men and then fired several shots at them. The two men were seriously injured. He then set fire to a car and fled. Police found a gas canister and a handgun in the car of the suspect.

Police later arrested the 84-year-old suspect, who was locally known as Claude Sinké at his home in Saint-Martin-de-Seignanx. He is also accused of trying to burn down the mosque.

Sinké died in prison on 26 February 2020, aged 84.

== See also ==
- Bærum mosque shooting - a similar shooting in Norway, in which one person was wounded
- Christchurch mosque shootings - a mass shooting in New Zealand in which 51 people were killed
- Zurich Islamic center shooting - a similar shooting in Switzerland, in which three people were wounded
