= Pierre Lenhardt =

French Catholic theologian (1927–2019)

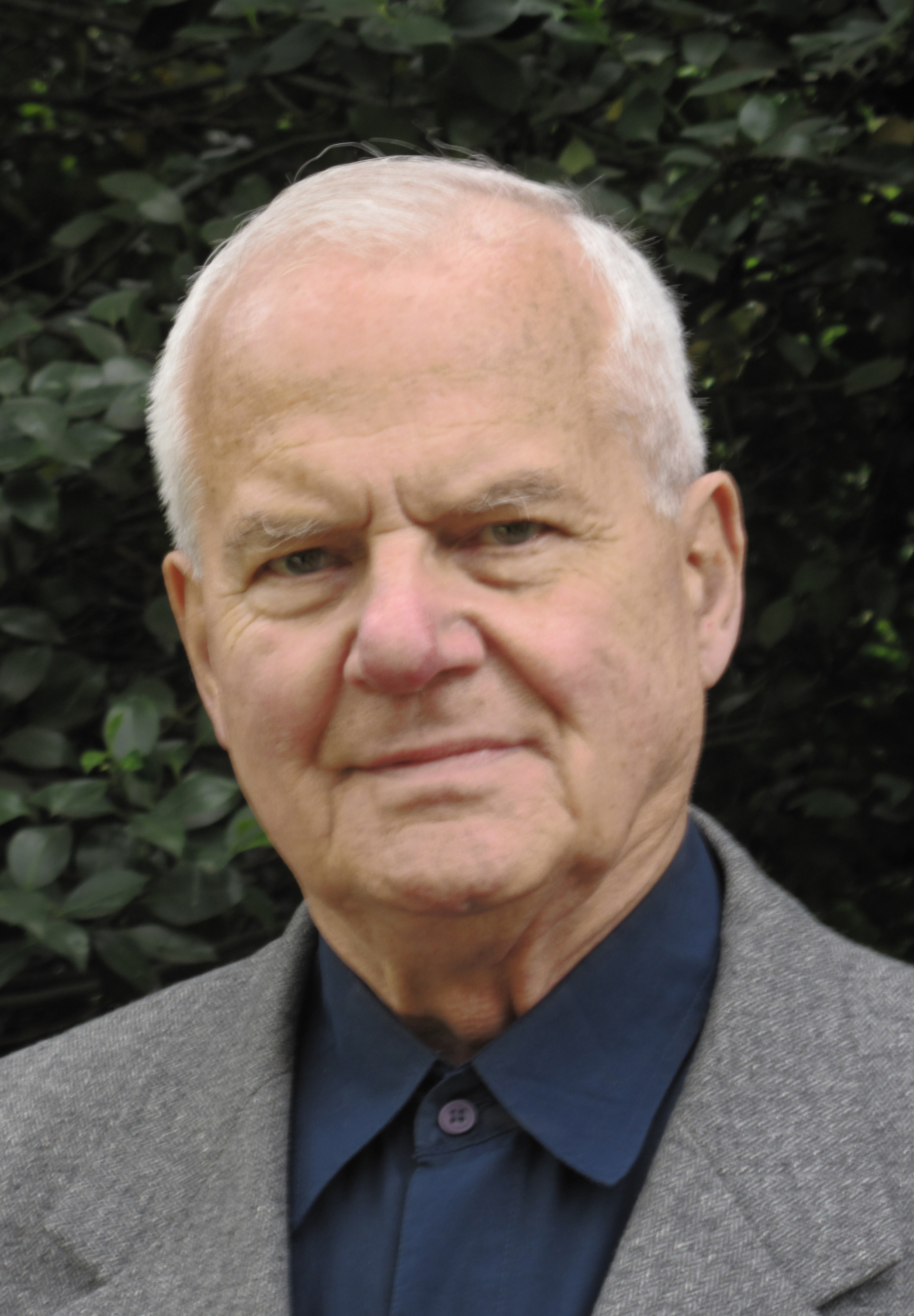
- Born: 5 November 1927; Strasbourg, France
- Died: 1 July 2019 (aged 91); Paris, France
- Occupation: Theologian

Pierre Lenhardt (5 November 1927 – 1 July 2019) was a French Catholic religious theologian in the Congregation of Our Lady of Sion.

== Career ==
Pierre Lenhardt spend most of his childhood in Morocco. He studied at ESSEC Business School and graduated in 1950. He began his career at Our Lady of Sion in 1962. He presented his master's thesis, titled Conditions de légitimité d'un témoignage chrétien auprès des juifs (Conditions of legitimacy of a Christian witness to the Jews) at the Catholic University of Paris in 1970. He gave lessons at the Catholic University of Paris as well as the Catholic University of Lyon, the École Biblique, among others in Brazil and Rome. He also directed a “Institut Saint-Pierre de Sion – Ratisbonne, Centre Chrétien d’Études Juives” (CCEJ) Ratisbonne Monastery in Jerusalem.

Lenhardt devoted his career to linking the teachings of the Catholic Church and Judaism. He was one of the first Catholic theologians to participate in Torah and Talmud readings in Jerusalem. He earned a master's degree in Hebrew studies from the Hebrew University of Jerusalem in 1976.

He received the prix de l'Amitié judéo-chrétienne de France in 2004.
