= Dominique Farran =

French journalist (1947–2019)

- Born: 18 April 1947
- Died: 5 November 2019 (aged 72)
- Occupation: Journalist

Dominique Farran (18 April 1947 – 5 November 2019) was a French radio host and journalist.

== Biography ==
Farran worked for Paris Match as a journalist and for RTL as a music columnist, where he covered rock concerts for 20 years.

Significant events covered by Farran include Ike and Tina Turner, Pink Floyd, Paul McCartney, The Rolling Stones, and Michel Polnareff.

He was also host of "Live", which was renamed to "WRTL Live" in 1980. The show was broadcast on Saturday nights.
