= Roland Leroy =

French journalist and politician (1926–2019)

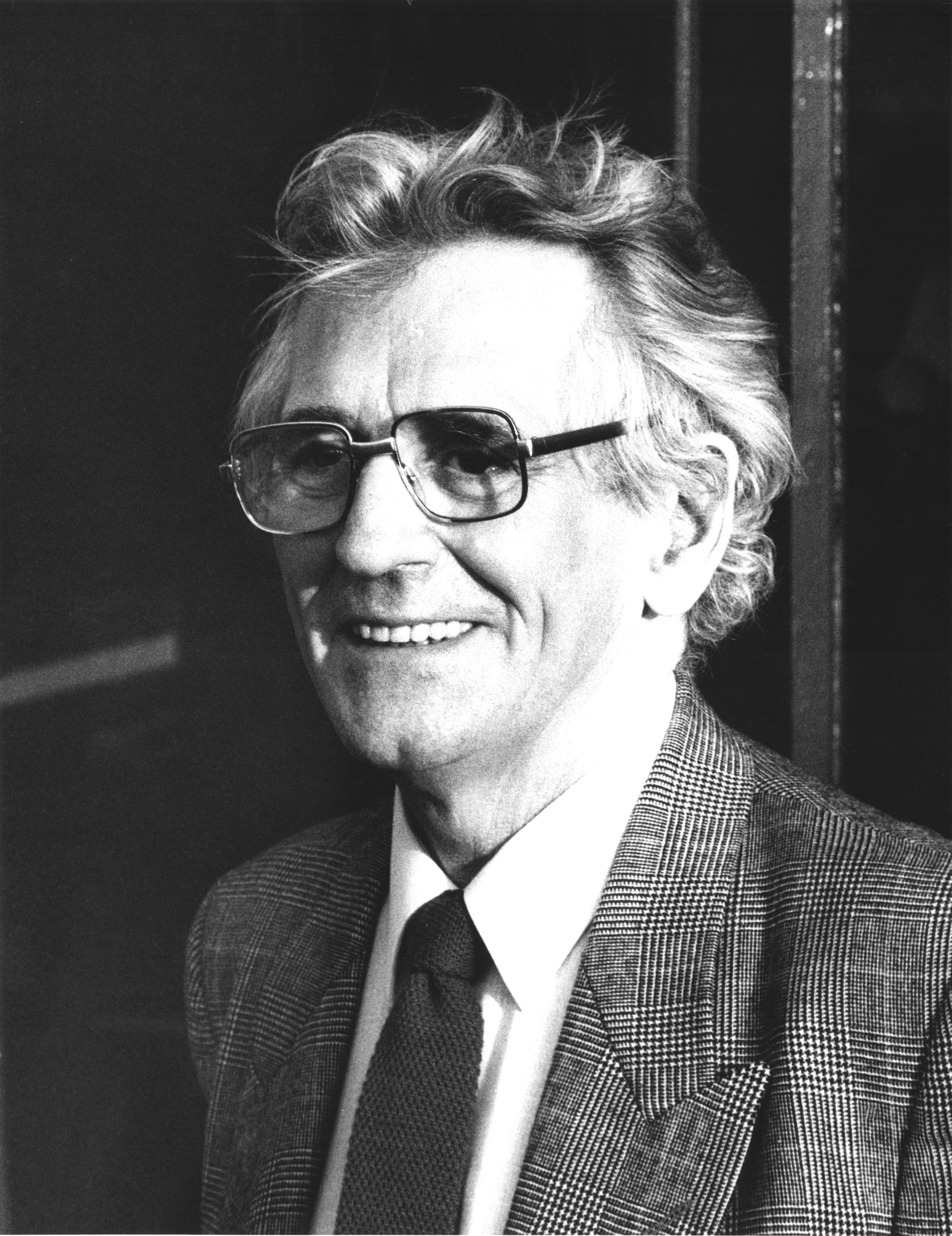

Member of the National Assembly for Seine-Maritime
- In office 2 April 1986 – 14 May 1988

Personal details
- Born: 4 May 1926 Saint-Aubin-lès-Elbeuf, France
- Died: 25 February 2019 (aged 92) Clermont-l'Hérault, France
- Party: French Communist Party
- Profession: Journalist

Roland Leroy (4 May 1926 – 25 February 2019) was a French journalist and politician. He served as a Communist member of the National Assembly from 1956 to 1958, and from 1967 to 1981, representing Seine-Maritime.

== Biography ==
Born to a railway worker father with Anarcho-syndicalism leanings and a textile worker mother, Roland Leroy followed in his father's footsteps and took up the same profession in 1942. An underground activist with the French Communist Youth Movement in 1942, he was responsible for distributing propaganda and in 1943 became head of the Communist Youth Movement in his department. At the same time, he joined the Resistance.

Between 1945 and 1947, he returned to his job as a railway worker while remaining a highly active member of the French Communist Party. He then rose through the ranks: federal secretary of Seine-Maritime, member of the Central Committee (1956-1994), the Politburo Bureau (1964-1994), and the Secretariat (1960-1979). In the mid-1960s, tasked with supervising the Union of Communist Students, he participated in the “normalization” of this organization in line with the PCF leadership, causing a hemorrhage of activists in this sector and rendering the UEC inaudible in universities before the events of May 1968.

In 1967, he was appointed by his party to replace Henri Krasucki as head of cultural policy and relations with intellectuals. A close friend of Louis Aragon, he supported him through his grief following the death of Elsa Triolet in 1970.

In the early 1970s, despite disagreeing with the very idea of a programmatic union with the PS, he led the group responsible for drafting the Common Program. After several failures in cantonal and legislative elections, and a first term as deputy for Seine-Maritime from 1956 to 1958, he regained his seat in the Assembly from 1967 to 1981, then from 1986 to 1988.

Probably due to disagreements with Georges Marchais, Roland Leroy was not reappointed to the Central Committee Secretariat at the 1979 PCF Congress, but remained a member of the Political Bureau.

At the Fête de l'Humanité in September 1981, a few months after François Mitterrand and the Union of the Left (France) won the election, he was tasked with delivering the traditional speech and criticized the government's concessions to what he called “yesterday's losers,” i.e., the right wing. He thus expressed the skepticism of part of the PCF leadership regarding the policies being implemented.

His public appearances were rare during the 2010s. In 2011, he delivered the eulogy for his friend André Duroméa, former Communist mayor of Le Havre. In 2012, on the thirtieth anniversary of Louis Aragon's death, he took part in a symposium at the headquarters of L'Humanité with Jean d'Ormesson, also an admirer of the writer.
