= Jean de Viguerie =

French historian (1935–2019)

- Born: 24 February 1935; Rome, Italy
- Died: 15 December 2019 (aged 84); Montauban, France
- Occupation: Historian

Jean de Viguerie (24 February 1935 – 15 December 2019) was a French historian. He specialized in the history of education and of the Catholic Church in the Enlightenment period.

== Biography ==
After his university studies were finished in 1956, de Viguerie completed his agrégation d'histoire in 1959. He then served in Algeria with the French military from 1961 to 1962.

De Viguerie completed his doctorate in 1973, and wrote his thesis on the activity of The activity of the religious congregation known as the Priests of Christian Doctrine or Christian Doctrine Fathers (in Latin Congregatio Patrum Doctrinae Christianae), founded by the Saint César de Bus (1544-1607) in 1592 for the religious instruction of children and of the poor. According to Raymond Darricau, the thesis constituted an enormous progress in our knowledge of the philosophical movement of the modern era".

Many of De Viguerie's works focused on the Christian faith during the Age of Enlightenment. In 1992, de Viguerie served on the scientific council of the National Rally Party.

De Viguerie was a professor emeritus at Charles de Gaulle University – Lille III and a member of the Consistori del Gay Saber. He served as president of the Magnificat Association.

== Works ==
- Trois semaines vécues à la Sorbonne : mai-juin 1968, texte de l'exposé fait à la réunion privée d'information du C.E.P.E.C. le… 19 juin 1968. Le Sens des événements, par Louis Salleron (1968)
- Une œuvre d'éducation sous l'Ancien Régime : les Pères de la Doctrine chrétienne en France et en Italie, 1592–1792 (1976)
- L'institution des enfants : l'éducation en France xvie – xviiie siècle (1978)
- Notre-Dame des Ardilliers : le pèlerinage de Loire (1986)
- Le catholicisme des Français dans l'ancienne France (1988)
- Histoire et dictionnaire du temps des Lumières, 1715–1789 (1995)
- Les deux patries : essai historique sur l'idée de patrie en France (1998)
- Itinéraire d'un historien : études sur une crise de l'intelligence, xviie – xxe siècle (2000)
- L'Église et l'éducation (2001)
- Louis XVI, le roi bienfaisant (2003)
- Filles des Lumières : femmes et sociétés d'esprit à Paris au xviiie siècle (2007)
- Le Sacrifice du soir : vie et mort de Madame Élisabeth, sœur de Louis XVI (2010)
- L'Église et l'éducation (2010)
- Les pédagogues : essai historique sur l'utopie pédagogique (2011)
- Histoire du citoyen (2014)
- Le passé ne meurt pas (2016)

== Awards ==
- Prix Marcelin Guérin (1976)
- Prix Renaissance des lettres (1987)
- Prix Hugues-Capet (2003)
