= Unity =

Unity is the state of being as one (either literally or figuratively). It may also refer to:

== Buildings ==
- Unity Building, Oregon, Illinois, US; a historic building
- Unity Building (Chicago), Illinois, US; a skyscraper
- Unity Buildings, Liverpool, UK; two buildings in England
- Unity Chapel, Wyoming, Wisconsin, US; a historic building
- Unity Church (Mattoon, Illinois), US; a historic church
- Unity Temple, Oak Park, Illinois, US; a Unitarian Universalist church

== Education ==
- Unity Academy (disambiguation)
- Unity College (disambiguation)
- Unity School District (Wisconsin), an American school district
- Unity University, an Ethiopian privately owned institute of higher learning

== Media and entertainment ==
- Assassin's Creed Unity, a 2014 action-adventure video game
- Classical unities, three rules for drama described by Aristotle
- "Unity", a 2006 episode of I Pity the Fool
- "Unity" (comics), a crossover story line in the Valiant universe
- Unity (film), a 2015 documentary
- "Unity" (Star Trek: Voyager), a 1997 episode of Star Trek
- Unity (team), a superhero team in titles published by Valiant Entertainment
- Unity (video game), a cancelled video game for the Nintendo GameCube
- Unity 101, a radio station in Southampton, England
- UNITY Journalists, an American alliance of journalists' associations
- Unity Performing Arts Foundation, a fine arts company based in Fort Wayne, Indiana

== Music ==
=== Albums ===
- Walt Dickerson Plays Unity, 1964
- Unity (Larry Young album), 1966
- Unity (Sun Ra album), 1977
- Unity (311 album), 1991
- Unity (Big Mountain album), 1994
- Unity (Dropkick Murphys and Agnostic Front EP), a 1999 split EP
- Unity (Avishai Cohen album), 2001
- Unity (Rage album), 2002
- Unity (George album), 2003
- Unity (Frank Wright album), 2006
- Unity (Mrs. Green Apple EP), 2022
- Unity (Ganja White Night album), 2023
- Unity (Joost Klein album), 2025

=== Bands ===
- The Unity, a Nepalese band featuring DA69 (Sudin Pokharel), Asif Shah, and Aidray
- Unity, a band formed by members of Uniform Choice
- UNITY, a Dutch girl group which represented the Netherlands in the Junior Eurovision Song Contest 2020

=== Songs ===
- "Unity" (Afrika Bambaataa and James Brown song), 1985
- "Unity" (Shinedown song), 2012
- "Unity" (TheFatRat song), 2014
- "U.N.I.T.Y.", a 1993 song by Queen Latifah
- "Unity", a song by Desmond Dekker and the Aces from Action!
- "Unity", a song by Kelly Rowland from Ms. Kelly
- "Unity", a song by Mordechai Ben David and Shea Mendelowitz, 1998
- "Unity", a song by Operation Ivy, 1989, also covered by many punk rock acts

=== Other uses in music ===
- Unity Christian Music Festival, a Michigan music festival

== Places ==
=== United States ===
- Unity, Georgia, an unincorporated community
- Unity, Illinois or Hodges Park Station, an unincorporated community
- Unity, Kentucky, a small unincorporated community
- Unity, Maine, a town in Waldo County
  - Unity (CDP), Maine, a census-designated place within the town
- Unity, Kennebec County, Maine, unorganized territory
- Unity, Missouri
- Unity, New Hampshire
- Unity, Adams County, Ohio
- Unity, Columbiana County, Ohio
- Unity, Oregon, a small city in Baker County
- Unity, Lane County, Oregon, an unincorporated community
- Unity, South Carolina, a census-designated place
- Unity, Wisconsin, a village in Clark and Marathon counties
- Unity, Clark County, Wisconsin, a town
- Unity, Trempealeau County, Wisconsin, a town
- Unity Township, Pennsylvania
- Unity Village, Missouri

=== Other places ===
- Unity, Saskatchewan, Canada
- Unity State, South Sudan
- Unity Village, Guyana

== People ==
- Unity Bainbridge (1916–2017), Canadian artist and poet
- Unity Dow (born 1959), judge, activist, writer and Government minister from Botswana
- Unity Phelan, American ballet dancer
- Unity Mitford (1914–1948), British socialite and fascist
- Unity Spencer (1930–2017), British artist

== Politics ==
- Ihud, a binational Jewish-Arab political party established in Mandatory Palestine in the 1940s
- Unity (asylum seekers organisation), a 2005 UK human rights group
- Unity (trade union), a British pottery workers' union
- Unity (Canada), a 1930s Communist movement
- Unity (Georgia), a left-wing political party
- Unity (Hungary), a 2014 political alliance
- Unity (Israel), a right-wing political party
- Unity (Latvian political party), a liberal-conservative party
- Unity (Northern Ireland), an electoral label used by Irish nationalist and leftist candidates in the late 1960s and early 1970s
- Unity (Russian political party), a 1999 party
- Unity (Transnistria), a 2000 political party
- Unity Party (disambiguation)
- Unity Committee, an 1878 organization for Bulgarians in Thrace and Macedonia
- Yedinstvo (Lithuania), a pro-Moscow movement during the Perestroika era

== Religion ==
- Unity Church, also known as the Unity School of Christianity
- Great Unity, a Confucian concept of a utopian world
- Unity (concept)

== Science and technology ==
=== Mathematics ===
- Unity (mathematics), the number 1
- A concept in ring theory in mathematics, also called identity

=== Space ===
- Unity (ISS module), a segment of the International Space Station
- VSS Unity (Virgin Space Ship Unity), a rocket-powered suborbital spaceplane

=== Communications ===
- Unity (cable system), for trans-Pacific communications

== Humanities ==
- Unity in diversity, a philosophical concept
- Unity of opposites, a category of dialectics
- Unity in variety, a principle in aesthetics
  - Unity (aesthetics)

== Ships ==
- Unitie, a ship of the Third Supply fleet to Virginia colony in 1609
- Unité, a French ship captured by the Royal Navy and renamed HMS Surprise (1796)
- HMS Unity, the name of several ships of the Royal Navy
- Unity (schooner), a ship that disappeared near Tasmania in 1813

== Software ==
- Unity (user interface), from Canonical (Ubuntu 11.04–17.04)
- Unity Application Block, part of Microsoft Enterprise Library
- Unity Technologies, developer of Unity game engine
  - Unity (game engine), a multi-platform game engine and development toolkit
- UNITY (programming language), a 1988 theoretical language
- Unity Operating System (Chinese: 统一操作系统) a Chinese Linux distribution

== Other uses ==
- Unity (military operation), the covert supply of Thai troops to the Laotian Civil War
- Unity (newspaper), a weekly publication by the Communist Party of Ireland, published in Belfast, Northern Ireland
- Unity (peer education project), a peer education project in the Dutch nightlife
- Unity of invention, a patent law requirement
- Unity Bridge (disambiguation), various bridges
- Unity Day (disambiguation), various holidays
- Unity FC (Canada), a Canadian soccer team
- Unity F.C. (Ghana), a Ghanan football team

== See also ==
- Unanimity
- Unified (disambiguation)
- Unify (disambiguation)
- Unit (disambiguation)
- Unite (disambiguation)
- United (disambiguation)
- Uniti, an Italian river
- Unity 1918, a 2001 play by Kevin Kerr
