= Pentamer =

Molecule made of five monomers

A pentamer is an entity composed of five subunits.

In chemistry, it applies to molecules made of five monomers.

In biochemistry, it applies to macromolecules, particularly pentameric proteins, made of five protein sub-units.

In microbiology, a pentamer is one of the proteins that compose the polyhedral protein shell that encloses the bacterial micro-compartments known as carboxysomes.

In immunology, an MHC pentamer is a reagent used to detect antigen-specific CD8+ T cells.

== See also ==
- penta prefix
- -mer suffix
- Pentamerism
- Pentamerous Metamorphosis, an album by Global Communication
- Pentamery (botany), having five parts in a distinct whorl of a plant structure
- Pentamerous can also refer to animals, such as crinoids
