= Unity, Lane County, Oregon =

Unincorporated community in the state of Oregon, United States

Unity, Oregon
- Unincorporated community
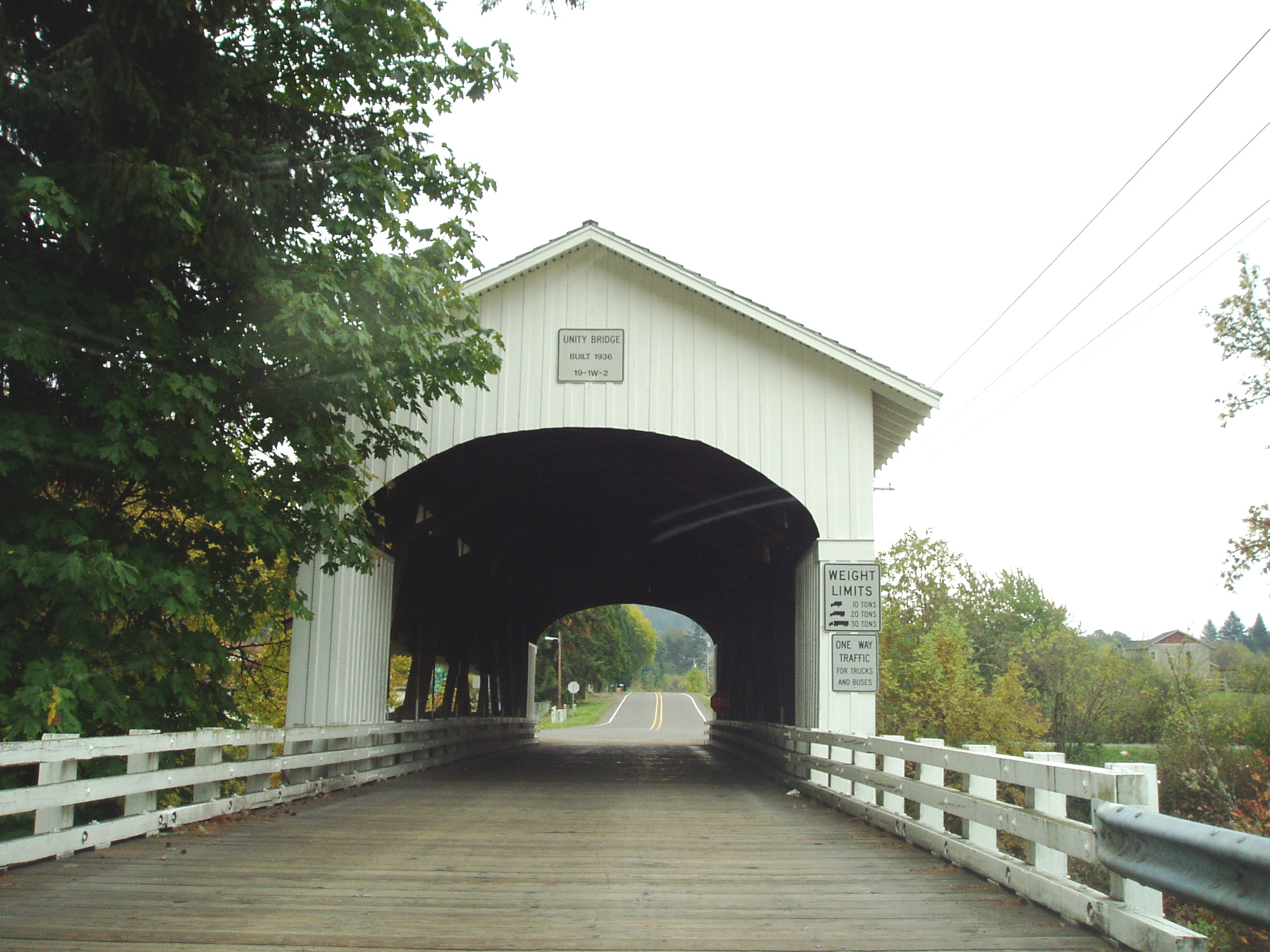
- Unity Bridge over Fall Creek

- Location within Oregon Location within the United States
- Coordinates: 43°56′49″N 122°46′04″W
- Country: United States
- State: Oregon
- County: Lane
- Elevation: 768 ft (234 m)
- Time zone: UTC-8 (PST)
  - Summer (DST): UTC-7 (PDT)
- Area code: 541
- GNIS feature ID: 1130617

Unity is an unincorporated community in Lane County in the U.S. state of Oregon. It lies long Fall Creek just below Fall Creek Reservoir, north of Lowell and southeast of Springfield and Eugene.

Unity Bridge, a covered bridge which carries Lowell–Unity Road (Lowell–Jasper Road), crosses the creek at Unity. Unity Park, a county park also known as Fall Creek Park, is 1.3 miles (2.1 km) beyond the bridge and downstream.
