= United =

United may refer to:

== Places ==
- United, Pennsylvania, an unincorporated community
- United, West Virginia, an unincorporated community

== Arts and entertainment ==
=== Films ===
- United (2003 film), a Norwegian film
- United (2011 film), a BBC Two film
- The United (film), an unreleased Arabic-language film

=== Literature ===
- United! (novel), a 1973 children's novel by Michael Hardcastle

=== Music ===
- United (band), Japanese thrash metal band formed in 1981

==== Albums ====
- United (Commodores album), 1986
- United (Dream Evil album), 2006
- United (Marvin Gaye and Tammi Terrell album), 1967
- United (Marian Gold album), 1996
- United (Phoenix album), 2000
- United (Woody Shaw album), 1981
- United (Dave Holland and Lionel Loueke album), 2024
- United (Newsboys album), 2019

==== Songs ====
- "United" (Judas Priest song), 1980
- "United" (Prince Ital Joe and Marky Mark song), 1994
- "United" (Robbie Williams song), 2000
- "United", a song by Danish duo Nik & Jay featuring Lisa Rowe
- "United (Who We Are)", a song by XO-IQ, featured in the television series Make It Pop

=== Television ===
- United (docuseries), a 2022 Western United football documentary series
- United (TV series), a 1990 BBC Two documentary series
- United!, a soap opera that aired on BBC One from 1965-1967
- "United" (Star Trek: Enterprise), a fourth season television episode

== Businesses ==
- United Airlines, a major American airline
- United Airways, a Bangladeshi airline
- United Automobile Services, a bus operator in England, now merged with the Arriva Group
- United Bank (Atlanta metropolitan area), Georgia, United States
- United Bank (Pakistan)
- United Bank (West Virginia), United States
- United Bus, a bus manufacturing group
- United Media Services, an Egyptian media conglomerate
- United Parks & Resorts, an American theme park and entertainment company
- United Petroleum, an Australian petrol retailer and importer
- United Technologies Corporation, an American multi-national
- United Telecommunications (disambiguation)
- London United Busways, a bus operating company in London
- London United Tramways, the former operator in London responsible for trams and trolleybuses from 1894 till 1933

== Sports ==
=== Association football ===
- Adelaide United FC, an Australian soccer club
- Annagh United F.C., a Northern Ireland football club
- Ballinamallard United F.C., a Northern Ireland football club
- Ballymena United F.C., a Northern Ireland football club
- Ballymoney United F.C., a Northern Ireland football club
- Ballynahinch United F.C., a Northern Ireland football club
- Barn United F.C., a Northern Ireland football club
- Bessbrook United F.C., a Northern Ireland football club
- Carlisle United, an English football club
- Chesterfield United, an English football club
- Coagh United F.C., a Northern Ireland football club
- Colchester United, an English football club
- Crewe United F.C., a Northern Ireland football club
- Crumlin United F.C. (Northern Ireland), a Northern Ireland football club
- D.C. United, an American soccer club
- Dongguan United, a Chinese football club
- F.C. United of Manchester, an English football club
- Fivemiletown United F.C., a Northern Ireland football club
- Grove United F.C., a Northern Ireland football club
- Hartlepool United, an English football club
- Hereford United, an English football club
- Hyde United, an English football club
- Leeds United, an English football club
- Manchester United, an English football club
- Newbuildings United F.C., a Northern Ireland football club
- Newcastle United, an English football club
- Oxford United, an English football club
- Oxford United Stars F.C., a Northern Ireland football club
- Peterborough United, an English football club
- Rotherham United, an English football club
- Saintfield United F.C., a Northern Ireland football club
- Scunthorpe United, an English football club
- Shankill United F.C., a Northern Ireland football club
- Sheffield United, an English football club
- Southend United, an English football club
- Tobermore United F.C., a Northern Ireland football club
- Torquay United, an English football club
- Western United FC, an Australian football club
- West Ham United, an English football club

=== Other sports ===
- United Rugby Club, a Canadian rugby union club founded in 2005
- United Athletic Conference (football) an American college football conference that started play in 2023
- United (horse), a racehorse

== Other uses ==
- United (Canarian electoral alliance), a Canary Island-based electoral alliance
- Ujedinjeni (United), parliamentary group in Serbia
- The United Theatre, commonly known as The United, a cultural and performance center in Westerly, Rhode Island

== See also ==
- UnitedHealth Group, an American health care company
- Unite (disambiguation)
- Unity (disambiguation)
