= Unified =

Unified may refer to:

- The Unified, a wine symposium held in Sacramento, California, USA
- Unified, the official student newspaper of Canterbury Christ Church University
- UNFD, an Australian record label
- Unified (Sweet & Lynch album), 2017
- Unified (Super8 & Tab album), 2014
- Unified (concert), a 2020 concert by Filipino singers Regine Velasquez and Sarah Geronimo
- Unified Thread Standard, a screw thread series most commonly used in the USA and Canada

Unify may refer to:

- Unify, an album by Electric Universe
- Unify Corporation, former name of Daegis Inc.
- Unify Gathering, an Australian music festival
- Unify GmbH & Co. KG, formerly Siemens Enterprise Communications

== See also ==
- Unifi (disambiguation)
- Unification (disambiguation)
- United (disambiguation)
- Unity (disambiguation)
