= Fall Creek (Middle Fork Willamette River tributary) =

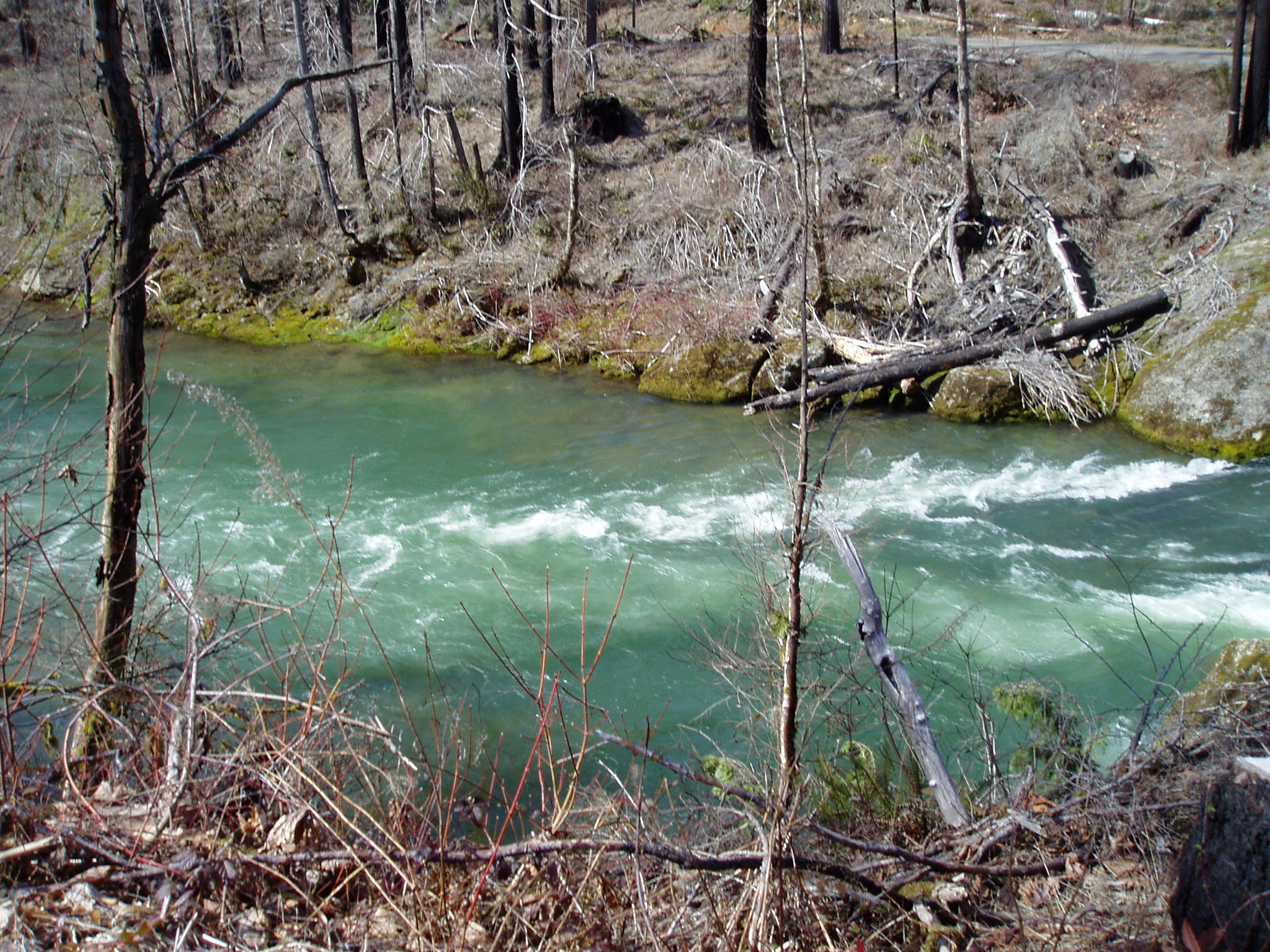
- Fall Creek in the Cascade Range foothills

- Location of the mouth of Fall Creek in Oregon

Location
- Country: United States
- State: Oregon
- County: Lane

Physical characteristics
- Source: Cascade Range
  - location: near Sardine Butte, Willamette National Forest
  - coordinates: 43°59′22″N 122°19′21″W
  - elevation: 3,782 ft (1,153 m)
- Mouth: Middle Fork Willamette River
  - location: near Jasper
  - coordinates: 43°58′14″N 122°52′10″W
  - elevation: 561 ft (171 m)
- Length: 34 mi (55 km)

Fall Creek is a 34-mile (55 km) tributary of the Middle Fork Willamette River in Lane County in the U.S. state of Oregon. Beginning in the Cascade Range, the creek flows generally west through the Willamette National Forest to enter the Middle Fork upstream of Jasper, southeast of Springfield and Eugene.

Along its upper and middle reaches, the creek flows by many campgrounds, picnic sites, a state park, and the Fall Creek National Recreation Trail. Fall Creek Reservoir is a man-made reservoir where the stream is impounded by Fall Creek Dam. Below the dam, the small communities of Unity and Fall Creek lie along the lower reaches. Two covered bridges carry rural roads over the creek, one at Unity and the other further downstream.

== Tributaries ==
Named tributaries of Fall Creek from source to mouth are Buzzard, Briem, Saturn, Delp, and Ninemile creeks. Then come Gold, Pacific, Tiller, Marine, Hehe, Small, and Gibraltar creeks. Further downstream are Alder, Puma, Jones, Portland, and Andy creeks.

Then come Bedrock, Slick, Timber, Boundary, and Little Gold Creek. North Fork Fall Creek is next, after which Winberry Creek enters at Fall Creek Lake. Little Fall Creek enters the main stem in the lower reaches below the lake.

== Covered bridges ==
Unity Bridge at Unity carries Unity–Lowell Road over Fall Creek. The bridge is about 1 mile (1.6 km) below Fall Creek Reservoir and about 6 miles (10 km) by water from the mouth of the creek. Unity Bridge was added to the National Register of Historic Places in 1979.

Further downstream, Pengra Bridge carries Place Road over the creek along its lower reaches. The 120-foot (37 m) Howe truss structure, built in 1938, was also added to the National Register of Historic Places in 1979.

== Recreation ==
=== Hiking and camping ===
Fall Creek National Recreation Trail runs 13.7 miles (22.0 km) along the creek between the Dolly Varden Campground and a trailhead near Tiller Creek. Access to the generally level hiking trail is via five trailheads at different points along the route. Log footbridges span the side streams of the trail, which connects to other trails, among them Clark Butte, Cowhorn Mountain, Gold Point, and Jones.

Campgrounds are found at intervals along the Fall Creek National Recreation Trail and Forest Road 18. These include Dolly Varden, Big Pool, Broken Bowl, Bedrock, and Puma. Clark Creek Organization Camp, built by the Civilian Conservation Corps in the 1930s, has sites for group camping.

=== State park ===
Fall Creek State Recreation Site, a state park at Fall Creek Reservoir, has a variety of campgrounds and day-use areas, each with amenities that vary from site to site. These include boat launches, swimming areas, picnic areas, toilets, and parking. The 167-acre (68 ha) park is open from May through September.

=== Fishing ===
Fishing in Oregon describes the creek as "beautiful" as well as popular with anglers in pursuit of fin-clipped Chinook salmon (Oncorhynchus tshawytscha), stocked rainbow trout (Oncorhynchus mykiss), and wild cutthroat trout (Oncorhynchus clarkii). Fin-clipped Chinook salmon are hatchery fish which were stocked through 2001. Currently, their descendants and wild salmon are trapped and hauled up over the dam. Outgoing salmon were historically challenged by predation by piscivorous non-native fish such as largemouth bass (Micropterus salmoides) and crappie (Pomoxis spp.) and difficulty navigating out over the dam. A novel study published in 2019 found that by simple, low-cost draining the reservoir to streambed for a short period each year for a number of years, salmon could more easily outmigrate and non-native warmwater fish were flushed out into coldwater, riverine conditions where they could not survive. This strategy has resulted in improved outmigration of salmon and led to the gradual disappearance of two species of predatory invasive fish (largemouth bass and crappie) in the artificial reservoir. Above Fall Creek Lake, the creek is heavily stocked with rainbow trout as far upstream as Gold Creek. Salmon, steelhead (sea-going rainbow trout), and salmon also frequent the creek downstream of the dam impounding the lake. The lake previously supported populations of non-native largemouth bass, crappie, bluegills, and a few trout.

== See also ==
- List of rivers of Oregon
