= Unit =

Unit may refer to:

== General measurement ==
- Unit of measurement, a definite magnitude of a physical quantity, defined and adopted by convention or by law
  - International System of Units (SI), modern form of the metric system
  - English units, historical units of measurement used in England up to 1824
  - Unit of length

== Science and technology ==
=== Physical sciences ===
- Natural unit, a physical unit of measurement
- Geological unit or rock unit, a volume of identifiable rock or ice
- Astronomical unit, a unit of length roughly between the Earth and the Sun

=== Chemistry and medicine ===
- Equivalent (chemistry), a unit of measurement used in chemistry and biology
- Unit, a vessel or section of a chemical plant
- Blood unit, a measurement in blood transfusion
- Enzyme unit, a measurement of active enzyme in a sample
- International unit, a unit of measurement for nutrients and drugs

=== Mathematics ===
- Unit number, the number 1
- Unit, identity element
- Unit (category theory), of an adjunction
- Unit (ring theory), an element that is invertible with respect to ring multiplication
- Unit, a tuple of length 0; an empty tuple
- Statistical unit, a data point on which statistical analysis is performed
- Unit angle, a full turn equal to an angle of 1
- Unit circle, a circle with a radius of length 1
- Unit cube, a cube with sides of length 1
- Unit fraction, a reciprocal of a positive integer
- Unit imaginary number, square root of negative 1 $(\sqrt{-1})$
- Unit impulse, an impulse of height 1
- Unit interval, an interval of distance 1
- Unit matrix, a diagonal matrix such that all elements on the main diagonal are 1 and all the others are zero
- Unit round-off, an upper bound on the relative error due to rounding in floating point
- Unit set, a singleton, a set with exactly 1 element
- Unit sphere, a sphere with a radius of length 1
- Unit square, a square with sides of length 1
- Unit vector, a vector with length equal to 1
- Unit type, a type allowing only one value in type theory

=== Computing ===
- Central processing unit, the electronic circuitry within a computer that carries out the instructions of a computer program
- GNU Units, a software program for unit conversion
- Rack unit, a unit of measure most commonly used to define the size of certain computing equipment
- Unit testing, a method by which individual units of source code are tested

== Business ==
- Stock keeping unit, a discrete inventory management construct
- Strategic business unit, a profit center which focuses on product offering and market segment
- Unit of account, a monetary unit of measurement
- Unit coin, a small coin or medallion (usually military), bearing an organization's insignia or emblem
- Work unit, the name given to a place of employment in the People's Republic of China
- Telephone card unit. When bought contains a certain amount of units, which make up their own currency for making telephone calls, that may not necessarily correspond to the monetary cost of the actual telephone card.

== Military ==
- Active service unit, the former Provisional Irish Republican Army cell
- Military unit, an homogeneous military organization whose administrative and command functions are self-contained
- Sayeret Matkal (The Unit), the Israeli special forces unit

== Arts and entertainment ==
- UNIT, a fictional military organization in the science fiction television series Doctor Who
- Unit of action, a discrete piece of action (or beat) in a theatrical presentation

=== Music ===
- Album-equivalent unit, a unified measure of music sales across traditional and digital formats
- Unit (album), 1997 album by the Australian band Regurgitator
- The Units, a synthpunk band

=== Television ===
- The Unit, an American television series
- The Unit: Idol Rebooting Project, South Korean reality TV survival show

== Other uses ==
- Unit of alcohol, a measure of the volume of pure ethanol in an alcoholic beverage
- Unit (currency), a proposal for a new international currency developed by the BRICS+ Business Council
- Unit (housing), a self-contained suite of rooms within a set of similar dwellings
- Unit, course credit at a school or other educational institution
- Prison Unit, a group of cells forming a cellblock or complex within a prison, such as the John B. Connally Unit, or Unit 32.
- Multiple unit, self-propelled train carriage capable of coupling other units of the same type
- Head unit, a component of a stereo system mounted inside of a vehicle
- Unit (Cristian Fleming) (born 1974), electronic musician based in New York City
- Unit (Norway), a government directorate

== See also ==
- Air unit (disambiguation)
- Piece (disambiguation)
- Subunit (disambiguation)
- Changan UNI-T, a compact crossover SUV
- Uni.T, a South Korean girl group
- UNITA, the second-largest political party in Angola
- Unite (disambiguation)
- Unity (disambiguation)
- United (disambiguation)
