= Unity Bridge (Lowell, Oregon) =

Covered bridge in Oregon, US

- U.S. National Register of Historic Places
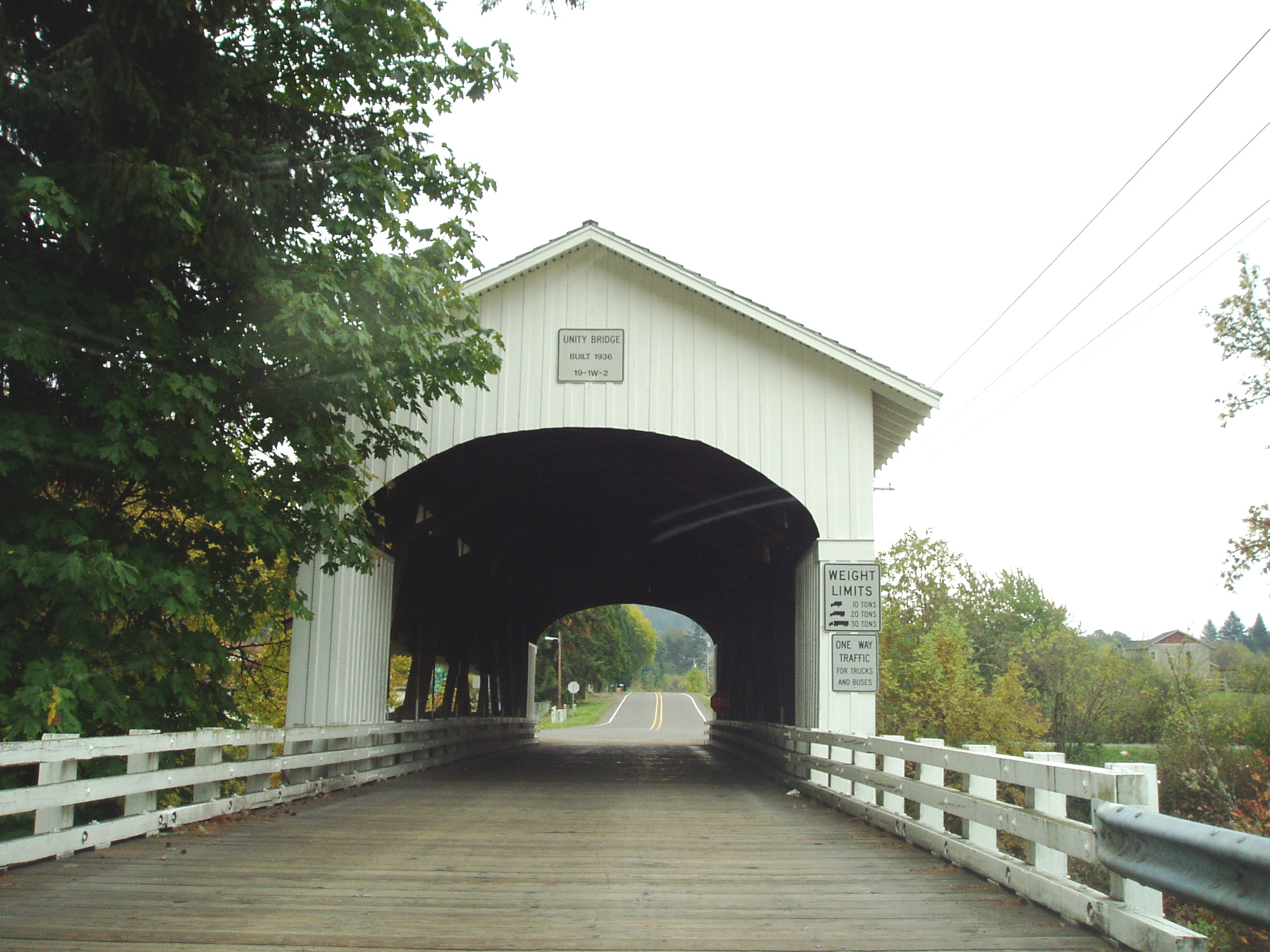
- Unity Bridge over Fall Creek

- Location within Oregon Location within the United States
- Nearest city: Lowell, Oregon
- Coordinates: 43°56′43″N 122°46′26″W
- Built: 1936
- Architectural style: Howe Truss
- MPS: Oregon Covered Bridges TR
- NRHP reference No.: 79002093
- Added to NRHP: November 29, 1979

Unity Bridge (World Guide Number 37-20-170) is an historic 90-foot (27 m) long covered bridge over Fall Creek at Unity near Lowell in Lane County, Oregon, United States. Also known as Unity Covered Bridge and Unity Creek Bridge, it was built in 1936 at a cost $4,400 by Lane County using the Howe truss system. Its east side features a full-length window with its own roof so that drivers can see oncoming cars.

The Unity Bridge was preceded by a covered bridge built in 1890. Limited to foot-traffic only after 1936, it was removed in 1953. The Unity Bridge, which replaced the original bridge, is 0.75 miles (1.2 km) further upstream. It is about 1 mile (1.6 km) downstream of the dam impounding Fall Creek Lake.

County officials temporarily closed the bridge for repairs in 1986. Work included a new floor, exterior painting, repair of piers and guardrails, and vandalism cleanup.

The bridge carries Lowell–Unity Road over the creek. Unity Bridge was added to the National Register of Historic Places in 1979.

== See also ==
- List of bridges on the National Register of Historic Places in Oregon
- List of Oregon covered bridges
