= Pengra Bridge =

Covered bridge in Oregon, US

- U.S. National Register of Historic Places
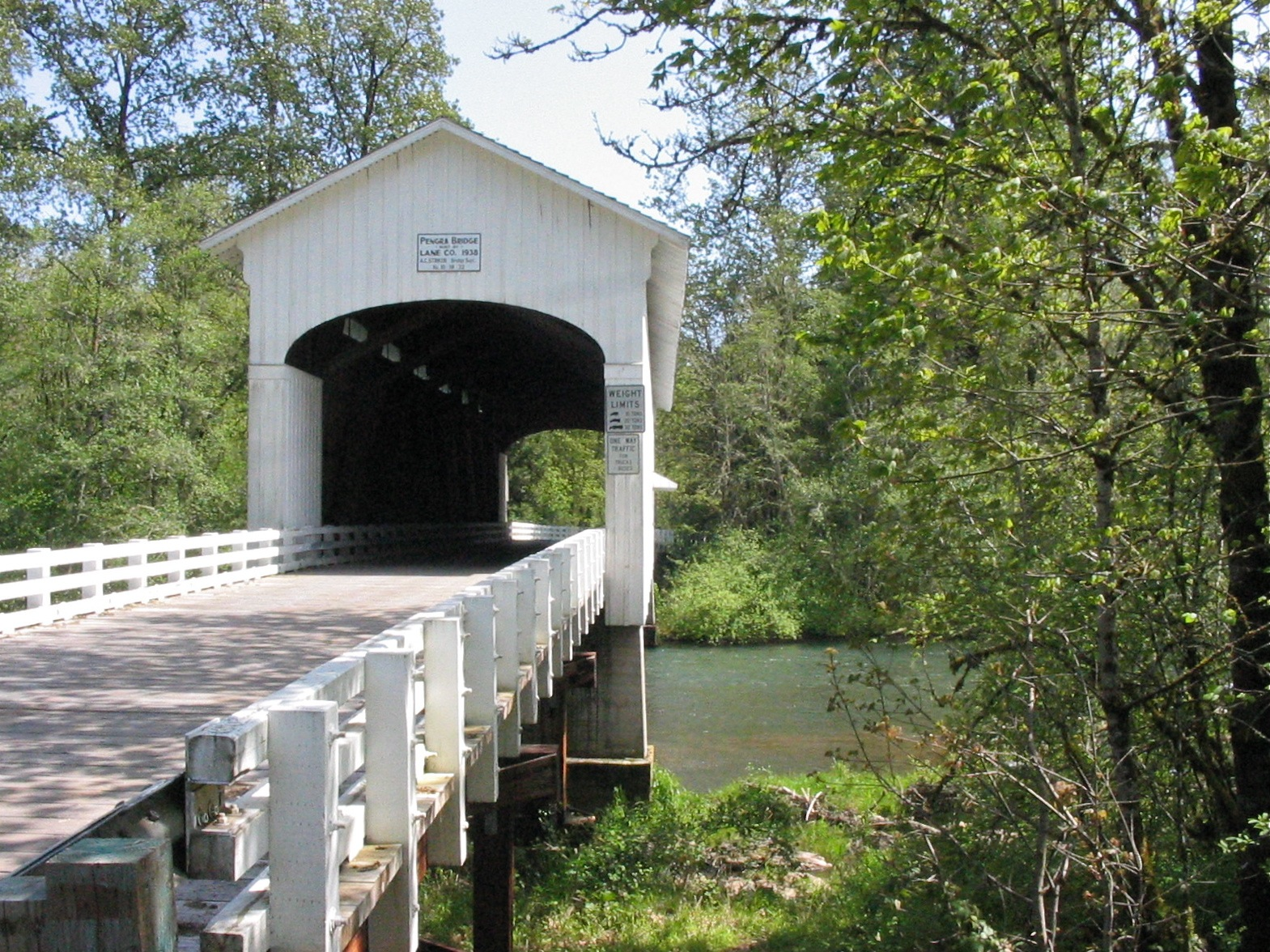
- The Pengra Bridge in 2006
- Location: Spanning Fall Creek on Place Road
- Nearest city: Jasper, Oregon
- Coordinates: 43°57′58″N 122°50′43″W
- Area: Approx. 8,400 square feet (780 m^{2})
- Built: 1938
- MPS: Oregon Covered Bridges TR
- NRHP reference No.: 79002092
- Added to NRHP: November 29, 1979

The Pengra Bridge is a covered bridge near Jasper in the U.S. state of Oregon. The 120-foot (37 m) Howe truss structure carries Place Road over Fall Creek in Lane County. It replaced an earlier bridge, built in 1904, that crossed the creek a few feet further upstream.

Pengra Bridge was named in honor of Byron J. Pengra, a government surveyor. The bridge was listed on the National Register of Historic Places in 1979.

The lower chords of the bridge, at 16 by 18 inches (41 by 46 cm) by 126 feet (38 m), are among the longest timbers ever used in an Oregon bridge. Timbers of this size simplified some aspects of construction but required special techniques to finish and position at the site. Other features of the bridge include ribbon windows under the eaves, a side window on one side, and semi-elliptical arched portals.

Weather and traffic weakened the bridge over time, and it was temporarily closed in 1979. With the help of state funding from the Oregon Covered Bridge Program, the county repaired the structure, which was re-opened to traffic in 1995.

== See also ==
- List of bridges documented by the Historic American Engineering Record in Oregon
- List of bridges on the National Register of Historic Places in Oregon
- List of Oregon covered bridges
- National Register of Historic Places listings in Lane County, Oregon
- Pengra Pass rail route
