= Lowell Bridge =

Covered bridge in Oregon, US

Lowell Covered Bridge
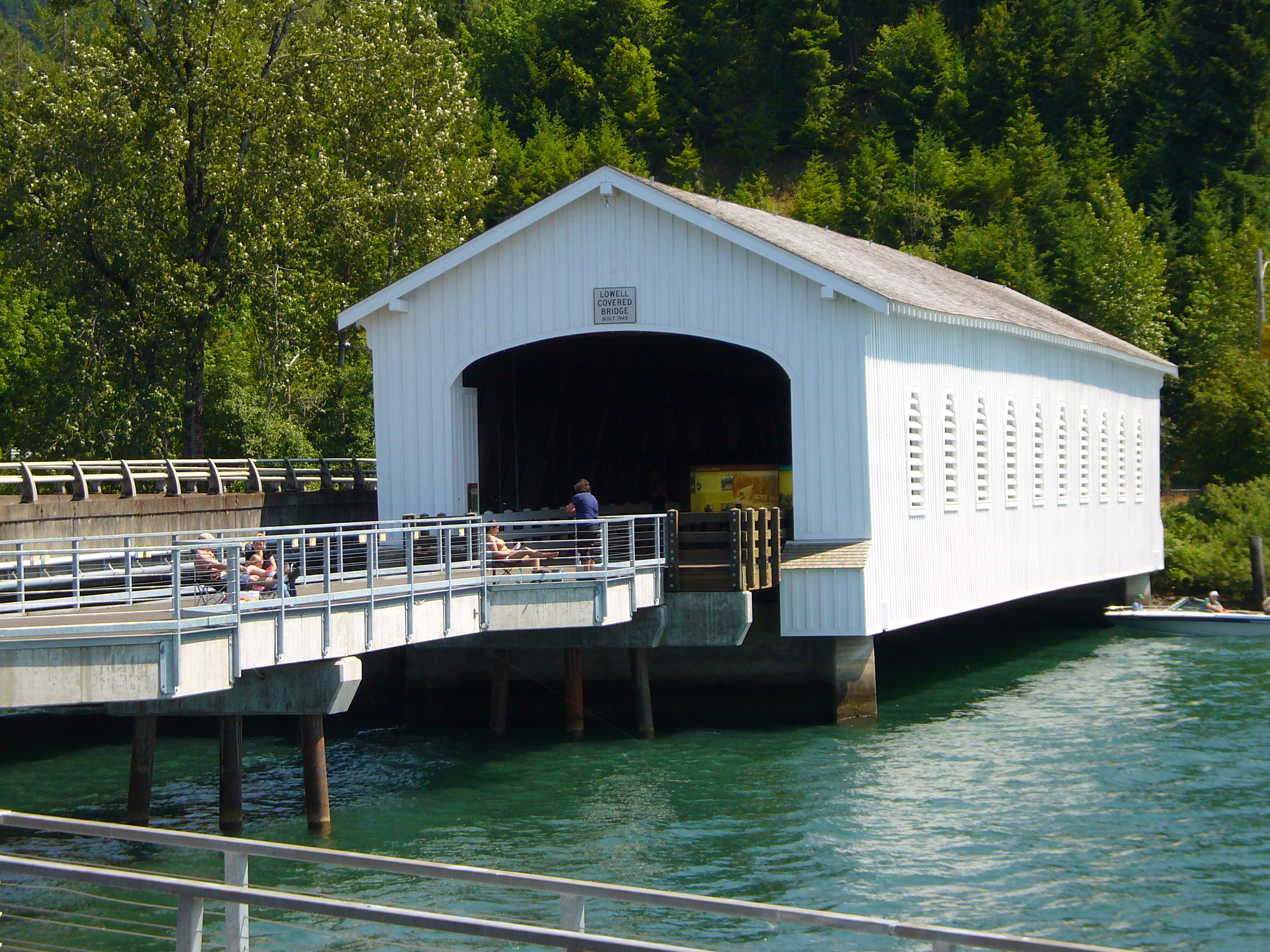
- The Lowell Covered Bridge from the interpretive center
- Coordinates: 43.9095702°N 122.7795150°W
- Carries: Pioneer Street
- Crosses: Dexter Lake
- Locale: Near Lowell, Oregon, U.S.
- Other name: Middle Fork Willamette River Covered Bridge
- Preceded by: First Lowell Bridge (replaced in 1945)
- Followed by: Pioneer Street (bypassed)

Characteristics
- Design: Covered Howe truss
- Total length: 165 feet (50 m)
- Clearance below: 2 feet (0.6 m) when dammed

History
- Opened: 1945
- Closed: 1981
- Lowell Bridge
- U.S. National Register of Historic Places
- Location within Oregon Location within the United States
- Nearest city: Lowell, Oregon
- Area: 0.3 acres (0.12 ha)
- Built: 1945
- MPS: Oregon Covered Bridges TR
- NRHP reference No.: 79002085
- Added to NRHP: November 29, 1979

Location
- Interactive map of Lowell Covered Bridge

Lowell Bridge is a covered bridge in Lowell, Oregon, United States. The original bridge was built in 1907. The current bridge was built in 1945. It was listed on the National Register of Historic Places in 1979.

== History ==
Before the Lowell Bridge was constructed, pioneer Amos Hyland settled on the Middle Fork Willamette River in 1874, and established the town of Lowell, which he named after his birthplace of Lowell, Maine. The founding of the town coincided with construction of a railroad through the settlement. At the site of the current bridge, Hyland operated a ferry across the river. The ferry operated until 1907, when a bridge was built by Nels Roney, who was also the builder of the Shelton-McMurphey-Johnson House in Eugene.

An accident occurred in 1945 when a truck caused major damage to the bridge. It was replaced by the current bridge, which is the widest in the state. In 1953, in preparation for the flooding expected to be caused by the Dexter Dam in two years, the entire bridge was raised 6 feet (1.8 m), and the floor replaced. Dexter Dam inundated the area, creating Dexter Reservoir, when it was completed in 1955. The engineers' water level calculations proved to be correct: the water clearance was about 2 feet (0.6 m).

== After 1979 ==
On November 29, 1979, the bridge was added to the National Register of Historic Places. A concrete bypass of the bridge was under construction at the time, when a dump truck with its bed up drove through, causing major damage to the bridge. Unlike the prior damage, the bridge was repaired with new roof braces and portal boards before the bypass was opened a few weeks later.

The Western Federal Lands Highway Division, Lane County, the Oregon Department of Transportation, and the United States Forest Service built an interpretive center in 2006 for $1.2 million. It includes several signs explaining the history of Lane County's covered bridges, and the area around Lowell and Lowell Bridge.

== See also ==
- List of bridges on the National Register of Historic Places in Oregon
- List of Oregon covered bridges
