= Michael Hardcastle =

British writer (1933–2019)

- Born: 6 February 1933; Huddersfield, Yorkshire, United Kingdom
- Died: 17 January 2019 (aged 85)
- Occupations: Novelist, Journalist, Literary Editor
- Writing career
- Subject: Children's Literature
- Notable awards: MBE for services to Children's Literature 1988

Michael Hardcastle MBE (6 February 1933 – 17 January 2019) was a British author of sports fiction for children. He has written more than one hundred and forty books on a range of sporting subjects but is probably best known for his books about association football. In 1988 he was appointed an MBE in recognition of his services to children's literature. He died in January 2019 at the age of 85.

== Education and early career ==
Hardcastle was born in Huddersfield and was educated at the nearby King James's Grammar School, Almondbury. Due to ill health he was unable to take part in much sporting activity and instead spent time in the school library where he developed a passion for English literature particularly the works of Charles Dickens and W.E. Johns. He later became editor of the school newspaper The Almondburian. When he left school he joined the Royal Army Educational Corps and served for five years, travelling to Kenya and Mauritius. In 1956 he joined the Huddersfield Examiner as a reporter. Later he worked for the Bristol Evening Post as a diarist and literary editor, and then for the Liverpool Daily Post as chief feature writer in 1965.

== Writing ==
It was while working Liverpool Daily Post that he published his first book Soccer Is Also a Game later published as Soccer Comes First in 1966 to coincide with the World Cup in England. This book, along with others written early in his career deal with Professional Football notably the fortunes of the fictitious Scorton Rovers and their star player Andy Blair. Others, including the Mark Fox series written in the 1970s and 1980s, focus on amateur football and tell of the trials and tribulations of youth football teams. Hardcastle has also written about many other sports including Showjumping, Cricket and Speedway.

== Selected bibliography ==
- Soccer Is Also a Game also published as Soccer Comes First (1966)
- Shoot on Sight (1967)
- Goal (1969)
- Reds and Blues (1970)
- Don't Tell Me What to Do (1970)
- In the Net (1971)
- Playing Ball (1972)
- Goals in the Air (1972)
- Island Magic (1973)
- United! (1973)
- Away from Home (1974)
- Free Kick (1974)
- The Demon Bowler (1974)
- The Big One (1974)
- On the Run (1974)
- Heading for Goal (1974)
- Flare Up (1975)
- Get Lost (1975)
- Mark Fox series (1976–82)
- The Saturday Horse (1977)
- First Contact series (1977)
- Crash Car (1977)
- Soccer Special (1978)
- Racing Bike (1980)
- Behind the Goal (1980)
- Half a Team (1980)
- The Gigantic Hit (1982)
- Winning Rider (1985)
- One Kick (1986)
- Snookered! (1987)
- Mascot (1987)
- Kickback (1989)
- Joanna's Goal (1990)
- Lucky Break (1990)
- The Away Team (1992)
- Own Goal (1992)
- Carole's Camel (1995)
- Puzzle (1995)
- The Fastest Bowler in the World (1996)
- The Price of Football (1998)
- Soccer Star (2003)
