= Unity Academy =

Unity Academy may refer to:

- Unity Academy Blackpool, an all-through school in Blackpool, Lancashire, England
- Unity City Academy, a secondary school in Middlesbrough, North Yorkshire, England

== See also ==
- Unity College (disambiguation)
- Unity (disambiguation)
