= Zebulon, Georgia =

- City
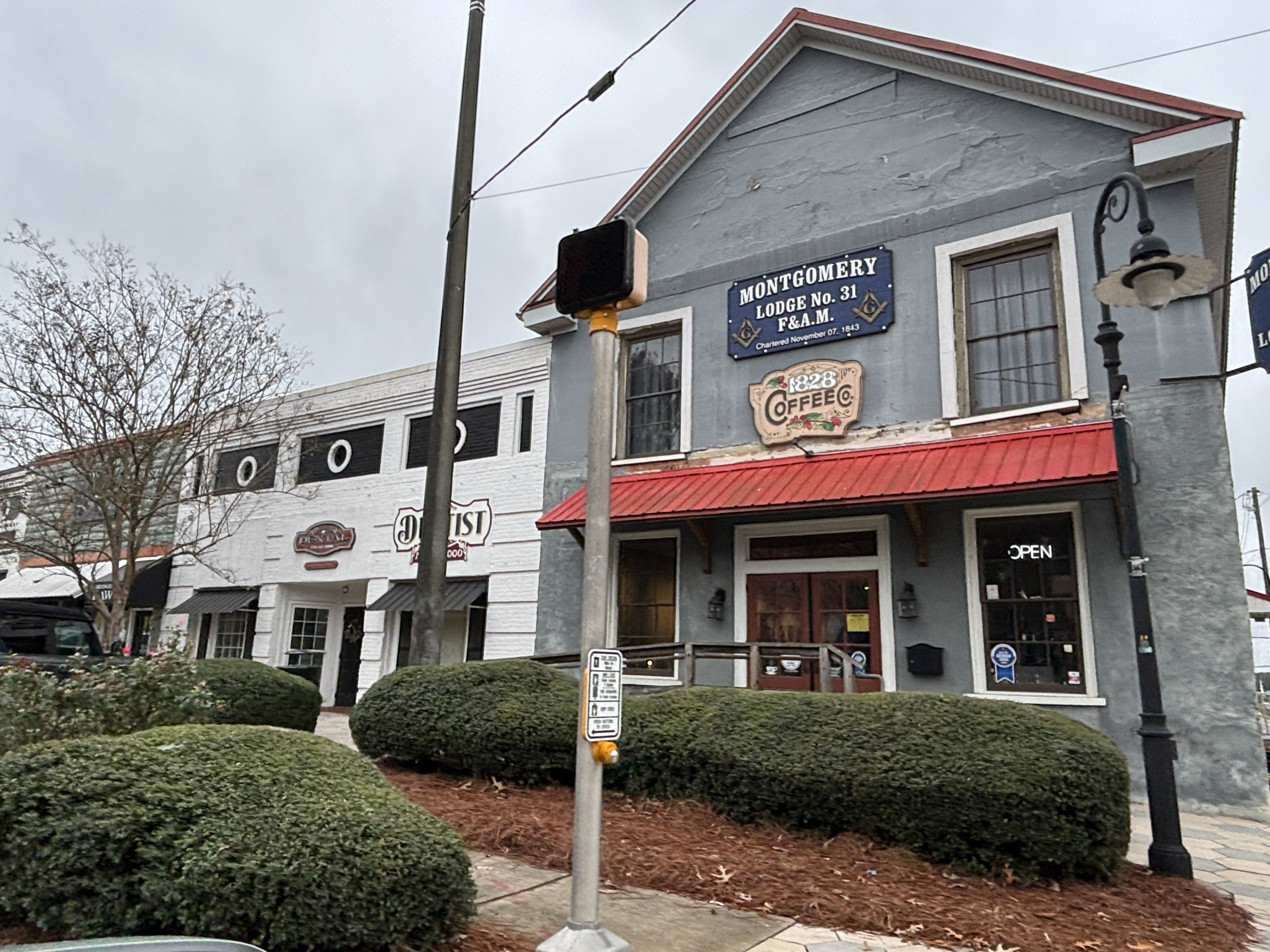
- Businesses on Barnesville Street

- Location in Pike County and the state of Georgia
- Coordinates: 33°5′56″N 84°20′32″W
- Country: United States
- State: Georgia
- County: Pike

Area
  - Total: 4.81 sq mi (12.47 km^{2})
  - Land: 4.73 sq mi (12.26 km^{2})
  - Water: 0.081 sq mi (0.21 km^{2})
- Elevation: 860 ft (262 m)

Population (2020)
  - Total: 1,225
  - Density: 258.8/sq mi (99.92/km^{2})
- Time zone: UTC-5 (Eastern (EST))
  - Summer (DST): UTC-4 (EDT)
- ZIP code: 30295
- Area codes: 470, 678 & 770
- FIPS code: 13-85128
- GNIS feature ID: 0333493
- Website: cityofzebulonga.us

Zebulon is a city in Pike County, Georgia, United States. The population was 1,225 in 2020. The city is the county seat of Pike County. The city and county were named after explorer Zebulon Pike.

== History ==
Zebulon was incorporated in 1825. The town was named after Zebulon Pike, a war hero and explorer.

== Geography ==
Zebulon is located at 33°5′56″N 84°20′32″W (33.098970, -84.342140).

According to the United States Census Bureau, the city has a total area of 3.55 sq mi (9.2 km^{2}), of which 3.5 sq mi (9.1 km^{2}) is land and 0.04 sq mi (0.10 km^{2}) (1.13%) is water.

Soils in Zebulon have dark reddish brown loamy surface horizons over red to dark red clay and are mostly mapped as Davidson or Lloyd series.

== Demographics ==
Historical population
Census	Pop.	Note	%±
1880	245		—
1890	315		28.6%
1900	361		14.6%
1910	602		66.8%
1920	629		4.5%
1930	576		−8.4%
1940	543		−5.7%
1950	539		−0.7%
1960	563		4.5%
1970	776		37.8%
1980	995		28.2%
1990	1,035		4.0%
2000	1,181		14.1%
2010	1,174		−0.6%
2020	1,225		4.3%
U.S. Decennial Census

=== 2020 census ===
As of the 2020 census, Zebulon had a population of 1,225. The median age was 37.2 years. 25.9% of residents were under the age of 18 and 14.2% were 65 years of age or older. For every 100 females there were 95.7 males, and for every 100 females age 18 and over there were 90.0 males age 18 and over.

There were 480 households, including 245 families. Of all households, 37.1% had children under the age of 18 living in them, 34.8% were married-couple households, 22.5% were households with a male householder and no spouse or partner present, and 35.2% were households with a female householder and no spouse or partner present. About 33.1% of all households were made up of individuals, and 12.0% had someone living alone who was 65 years of age or older.

There were 516 housing units, of which 7.0% were vacant. The homeowner vacancy rate was 1.7% and the rental vacancy rate was 4.2%.

0.0% of residents lived in urban areas, while 100.0% lived in rural areas.

Zebulon racial composition as of 2020
Race	Num.	Perc.
White (non-Hispanic)	778	63.51%
Black or African American (non-Hispanic)	318	25.96%
Asian	10	0.82%
Other/Mixed	65	5.31%
Hispanic or Latino	54	4.41%

== Economy ==
United Bank is located in Zebulon.

== Education ==
=== Higher education ===
Georgia Military College has an extension campus near Zebulon City Hall.

=== Pike County School District ===
The Pike County School District serves Zebulon. The school district has one Pre-K school (lottery funded), a primary school (K–2), an elementary school (3–5), a middle school (6–8), a ninth grade academy and two high schools. In 2004, the district had 156 full-time teachers and over 2,800 students. In 2021, it reported 3,500 students.

- Pike County Pre-K School
- Pike County Primary School
- Pike County Elementary School
- Pike County Middle School
- Pike County Ninth Grade Academy
- Pike County High School
- Zebulon High School

== Notability and popular culture appearances ==
Singer/songwriter Vic Chesnutt was raised in Zebulon. In 2006, he was ranked by Robin Hilton of NPR as the #5 living songwriter.

The courthouse in Zebulon can be seen in the 1983 television film Murder in Coweta County starring Andy Griffith and Johnny Cash. The 1984 movie Tank starring James Garner was filmed in and around the town.
