= Half a Team =

1980 novel by Michael Hardcastle

- Author: Michael Hardcastle
- Language: English
- Genre: Novel
- Publisher: Methuen
- Publication date: 1980
- Publication place: United Kingdom
- Media type: Print
- Pages: 110 pp (paperback)
- ISBN: 978-0-7497-0126-0

Half a Team is a 1980 children's novel by prolific British author Michael Hardcastle.

== Plot summary ==
The book is the sixth in Hardcastle's series about a Junior football League and features recurring characters Nick Abel- Smith (United! 1973, Away from Home (1974) and Lester Rowan (Away from Home). The book follows the story of Abel-Smith and fellow young footballer Steve Sewell as they attempt to overcome the humiliation of being dropped from their respective teams ahead of a five-a-side tournament. Joining forces they create a new team, The Swifts, and, after overcoming a series of obstacles, including getting Steve from Manchester back to their home town without his parents' knowledge, enter the tournament and finally get the opportunity to take on their former teammates and prove their worth.
