= Goals in the Air =

1972 novel by Michael Hardcastle

- First edition
- Author: Michael Hardcastle
- Language: English
- Genre: Novel
- Publisher: Heinemann
- Publication date: 1972
- Publication place: United Kingdom
- Pages: 157 pp (paperback)

Goals in the Air is a 1972 children's novel by prolific British author Michael Hardcastle.

== Plot summary ==
The book tells the story of Kenny Rider a young striker who plays for fictitious Second Division team Marton Rangers. Kenny manages to break into the first team at the age of sixteen and attracts a lot of attention and some jealousy for his talent and goalscoring ability. Unfortunately, off the field Kenny has to contend with a range of problems including an apathetic girlfriend and an actively hostile father. Whilst many of Hardcastle's other books see their protagonists triumph over adversity, the end of this short novel sees Kenny continuing to struggle with the many pressures of top class football.
