= Unity College =

Unity College may refer to:

- Unity College Northampton in the United Kingdom
- Unity College (Burnley) in the United Kingdom
- Unity College (Caloundra) in Australia
- Unity Environmental University, formerly Unity College, in the United States

== See also ==
- Unity Academy (disambiguation)
- Unity (disambiguation)
