= Unite =

Unite may refer to:

== Arts, entertainment, and media ==
=== Music ===
==== Albums ====
- Unite (1GN album), 2016
- Unite (A Friend in London album), 2013
- Unite (Kool & the Gang album), 1992
- Unite (The O.C. Supertones album), 2005

==== Songs ====
- "Unite!", by Ayumi Hamasaki from I Am..., 2001
- "Unite", by Beastie Boys from Hello Nasty, 1998
- "Unite", by Bliss n Eso from Circus in the Sky, 2013
- "Unite", by B'z from Highway X, 2022
- "Unite", by the O.C. Supertones from Supertones Strike Back, 1997

=== Periodicals ===
- Unite, the newspaper of the United Socialist Party (UK)

== Companies and organizations ==
=== Companies ===
- Unité, a mobile network operator in Moldova
- Unite Group, a U.K. company that specialises in student accommodation

=== Labor unions ===
- UNITE HERE, a labor union in the U.S. and Canada, formed by the merger of UNITE and HERE in 2004
- Union of Needletrades, Industrial and Textile Employees, or UNITE, a labor union in the U.S. from 1995–2004
- Unite the Union, a British and Irish trade union, formed by the merger of Amicus and T&G
- Unite Union (Australia), a trade union in Australia
- Unite Union, a trade union in New Zealand

=== Other companies and organizations ===
- UNiTE to End Violence against Women, organising name for the International Day for the Elimination of Violence against Women

== Ships ==
- Unité, a French ship captured by the British Royal Navy and renamed HMS Surprise (1796)
- HMS Unite, a British Royal Navy ship name
  - French frigate Gracieuse (1787), captured by the British Royal Navy and renamed HMS Unite
  - HMS Unite (1803), captured by the British Royal Navy, originally the French ship Impérieuse

== Other uses ==
- Unite (English coin), first produced during the reign of James I
- Unite (horse), a racehorse
- UNITE (satellite), a CubeSat nanosatellite
- Unite, the domain name for the web address of the State University of Tetova, Macedonia
- Opera Unite, a now discontinued sharing and collaboration platform based on the Opera browser
- Unité d'Habitation, a modernist residential housing design principle developed by Le Corbusier
- Unite, annual developer conferences organized by Unity Technologies

== See also ==
- Unit (disambiguation)
- United (disambiguation)
- Unity (disambiguation)
