= Unity Bridge (disambiguation) =

Unity Bridge may refer to:

- Unity Bridge, under construction, between Tanzania and Mozambique
- Unity Bridge 2 upstream from the Unity Bridge, also between Tanzania and Mozambique
- Unity Bridge (Lowell, Oregon), covered bridge in Oregon, U.S.
