= Unifi =

Unifi, UniFi or UNIFI may refer to:

- Malaysian telecommunication services:
  - Unifi (internet service provider), a high-speed broadband service
  - Unifi Mobile, a mobile telecommunication service
  - Unifi TV, an IPTV service
  - Unifi Sports, a subscription network on Unifi TV
- UNIFI (trade union), a 1999–2004 British trade union representing the financial sector
- Unifi Aviation, a North American aviation ground handling service
- Unifi Manufacturing, an American-based textile company
- Ameritas, formerly UNIFI Companies, an American mutual insurance company
- University of Florence (Università degli Studi di Firenze), Italy
- Unifi Network, a former division of PricewaterhouseCoopers made up of the Kwasha Lipton Group and its other benefits consulting divisions
- UniFi, a wireless networking system from Ubiquiti

== See also ==
- Unified (disambiguation), including uses of "Unify"
