= Fall Creek Lake =

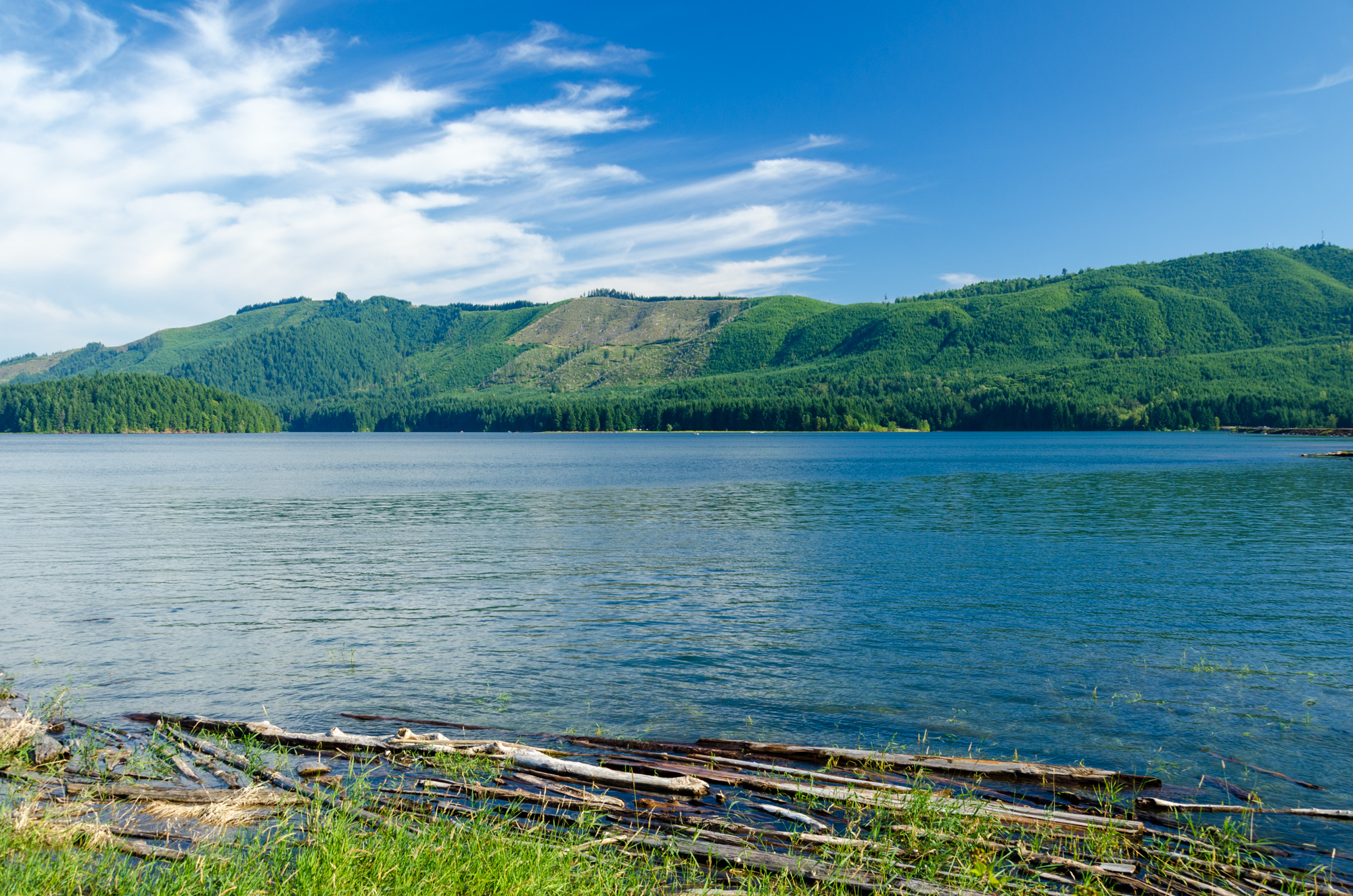
- Fall Creek Reservoir. Lane County.

- Location within Oregon Location within the United States
- Location: Lane County, Oregon
- Coordinates: 43°56′33″N 122°45′25″W
- Type: Reservoir, mesotrophic
- Primary inflows: Fall Creek
- Primary outflows: Fall Creek
- Catchment area: 184 square miles (480 km^{2})
- Basin countries: United States
- Surface area: 1,716 acres (694 ha)
- Average depth: 67 feet (20 m)
- Max. depth: 161 feet (49 m)
- Water volume: 125,000 acre-feet (154,000,000 m^{3})
- Residence time: 3.5 months
- Shore length^{1}: 22 miles (35 km)
- Surface elevation: 834 feet (254 m)
- Settlements: Unity, Lowell
- ^{1} Shore length is not a well-defined measure.

Fall Creek Lake (also known as Fall Creek Reservoir) is a reservoir in Lane County, in the U.S. state of Oregon. It is about 22 miles (35 km) southeast of Eugene on Fall Creek, immediately upstream from Unity Bridge, a covered bridge. The communities of Unity, at the bridge site, and Lowell, south of Unity, are near the lake. The unincorporated community of Jasper is further downstream, below the confluence of Fall Creek with the Middle Fork Willamette River.

Fall Creek Dam, 205 feet (62 m) high, impounds up to 125,000 acre-feet (154,000,000 m^{3}) of water in the reservoir. The embankment dam is of the rockfill type with a gated concrete spillway and outlet controls for regulating lake levels. The lake includes two arms, one along the Fall Creek main stem and one along Winberry Creek, a tributary entering from the south.

== History ==
Fall Creek Lake is one of 13 multi-purpose water projects managed by the United States Corps of Engineers in the Willamette Valley. The reservoir, completed in 1966, functions mainly to control downstream flooding on the Willamette River but is also heavily used for recreation when the lake is full. The Corps keeps water levels high—up to 161 feet (49 m)— in the lake during the spring and early summer but draws them down by up to 100 feet (30 m) below maximum in late summer through winter. This creates storage capacity for potential flood water in the rainy season. Mud flats that appear during the drawdown make recreational uses less feasible.

== Recreation ==
In addition to a variety of campsites, amenities at the lake include picnic tables, boat ramps, swimming areas, toilets, and a fishing pier. Activities on the lake also include waterskiing and jet-skiing.

Winberry Creek Road runs along the Winberry arm and meets Lowell–Unity Road (Lowell–Jasper Road) near the covered bridge. Big Fall Creek Road and Peninsula Road branch off Winberry Creek Road and, along opposite shores, follow the Fall Creek arm upstream to the end of the lake. Each road leads to one or more of the many day-use sites and campgrounds around the lake. Forest Road 18 begins at the head of the lake and follows Fall Creek upstream for many miles to other campgrounds and hiking trails in the Cascade Range.

== In popular culture ==
The dam and release gates were used as a filming location in the 1976 Irwin Allen TV film, Flood!
