= Air unit =

Air unit may refer to:

- Aerial warfare
- Air handler
- Carbon credit
- Police aircraft

== See also ==
- Air (disambiguation)
- Unit (disambiguation)
- Air conditioning unit
