= Fall Creek State Recreation Site =

State park in Oregon, US

- Location within Oregon Location within the United States
- Type: Public, state
- Location: Lane County, Oregon
- Nearest city: Eugene
- Coordinates: 43°56′29″N 122°44′52″W
- Operator: Oregon Parks and Recreation Department

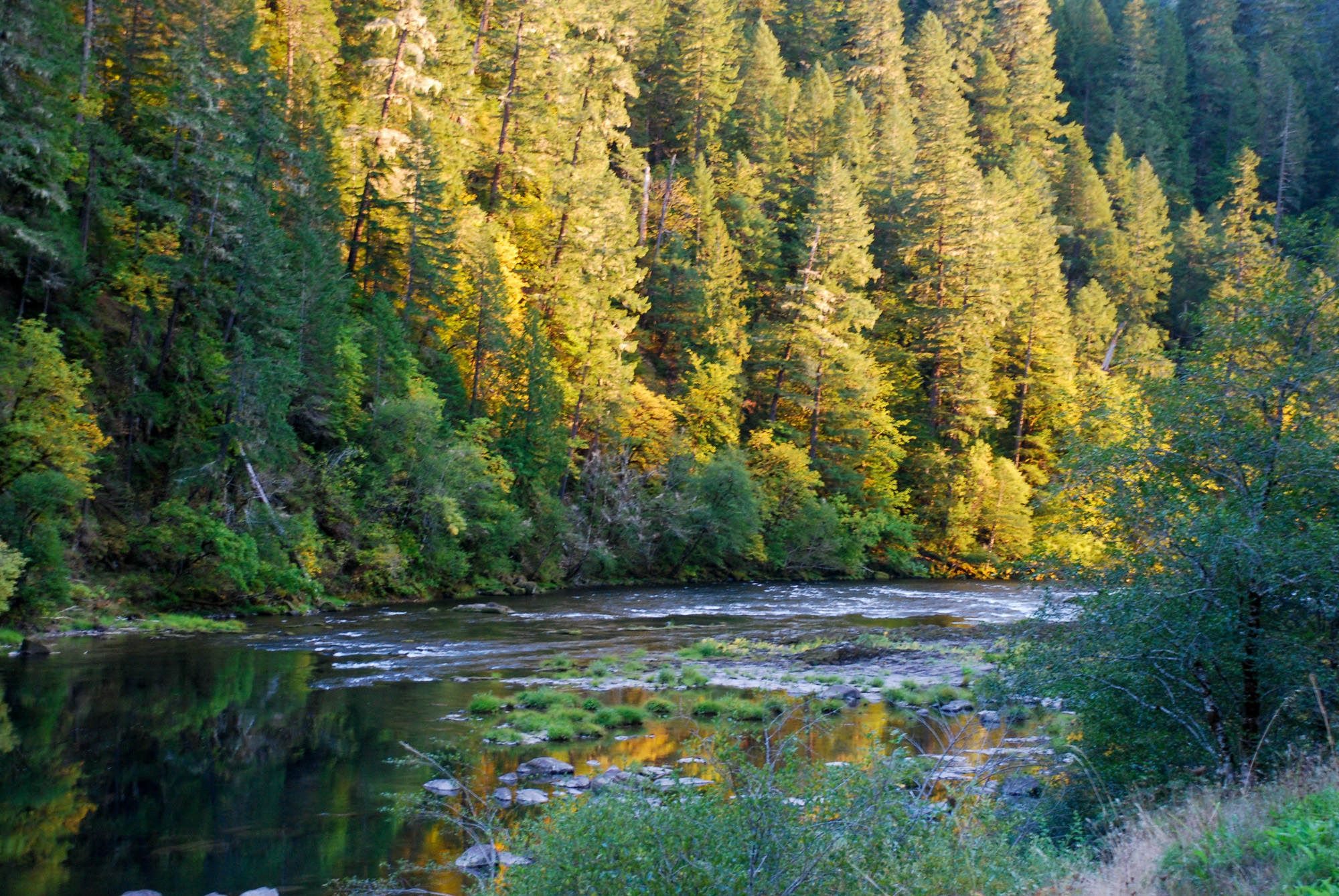
The North Umpqua River and fall foliage near Fall Creek in the Cascade Mountains. Douglas County.

Fall Creek State Recreation Site is a state park in the U.S. state of Oregon, administered by the Oregon Parks and Recreation Department. The park includes 47 campsites that do not include many luxuries. Each site includes a picnic table and a fire ring. There is also a designated swimming area in the lake that Fall Creek flows into. A dock and boat ramp are on the lake as well.

== See also ==
- List of Oregon state parks
