= Soccer Comes First =

1966 novel by Michael Hardcastle

- First edition (original title)
- Author: Michael Hardcastle
- Original title: Soccer Is Also a Game
- Language: English
- Genre: children's sports novel
- Publisher: Heinemann
- Publication date: 1966
- Publication place: United Kingdom
- Pages: 157 pp (paperback)
- ISBN: 0-330-25810-9
- Followed by: Shoot on Sight

Soccer Comes First (originally published as Soccer Is Also a Game) is a 1966 children's novel by prolific British author Michael Hardcastle. It is the first in a series of books focusing on the fortunes of fictitious English football team Scorton Rovers.

== Plot summary ==
The book begins with retired England striker Andy Blair who has recently moved to the town of Scorton watching the local team struggle in a Second Division match. After the game he is approached by club chairman Herbert Graydon who convinces him to come out of retirement and play for Rovers. As the story progresses Andy, whose performances begin to lift Rovers up the table, introduces his eighteen-year-old son Bobbie into the team. Bobbie, despite playing well, becomes mixed up with some local match-fixers and experiences some difficulties in his relationship with his girlfriend Adrienne who he follows to Bristol on the eve of a big game to try to resolve their problems. Andy feels forced to take matters into his own hand and tackles the match-fixers himself before retrieving his son. At the novel's conclusion the Blairs are reunited and can finally concentrate on trying to ensure Rovers win promotion to the First Division.
