= Unification =

Unification or unification theory may refer to:

== Computer science ==
- Unification (computer science), the act of identifying two terms with a suitable substitution
- Unification (graph theory), the computation of the most general graph that subsumes one or more argument graphs (if such a graph exists)
- Han unification, an orthographic issue dealt with by Unicode

== Physics ==
- Unification (physics) of the observable fundamental phenomena of nature is one of the primary goals of physics
- Grand Unified Theory, a model in particle physics
- Unified field theory, a type of field theory

== Popular culture ==
- Unification (album), a 1998 album by the band Iron Savior
- "Unification" (Star Trek: The Next Generation), a two-part episode of Star Trek: The Next Generation

== Sport ==
- The act of producing an undisputed championship in boxing
- The act of producing an undisputed championship in professional wrestling

== Other uses ==
- Semantic unification, in philosophy, linguistics, and computer science
- Unification Church or Movement, a spiritual movement founded in Korea
- Unification or re-unification of sovereign states, see political union

== See also ==
- Unification Church
- Unionism (disambiguation)
- Unified (disambiguation)
