= Subunit =

Subunit may refer to:

- Subunit HIV vaccine, a class of HIV vaccine
- Protein subunit, a protein molecule that assembles with other protein molecules
- Monomer, a molecule that may bind chemically to other molecules to form a polymer
- Sub-subunit, a military subunit is a component or subordinate element of a unit (military)
- Subunit (format), test reporting and controlling protocol

== See also ==
- Unit (disambiguation)
