= Unity in variety =

Aesthetic principle stating that beauty is derived from combining diverse components

In aesthetics, "unity in variety" (sometimes "unity in diversity") is a principle declaring that in art beauty can come from the variety of diverse components grouped together thus creating a fused impression as a whole. In the more broad meaning, to find pleasure in interaction with any set of objects, humans need to perceive order among the parts of the set. Human brain is wired to see the connections, so finding such groups (based on elements being close together or having similar looks, sounds, or textures) feels aesthetically pleasing.

Paul Hekkert offers a multi-course meal as an example: a pleasing meal might have a variety of tastes between different courses, yet the unity is provided by the (common) consistency of tastes within each course.

The interdisciplinary concept of unity in variety is studied in psychology (principles of grouping constitute part of the Gestalt theory), philosophy, visual arts, music, information theory.

== Variety vs. unity ==
Unity and variety, as partial opposites, are both contributing to the aesthetic pleasure. Variety characterizes the quantity and scale of perceived differences encountered. Humans seek the variety (that carries a promise of learning) to avoid the state of boredom, yet too much variety is perceived as chaos. Human brain needs the generally chaotic world to be structured for a better apperception, perceptual organization, and processing fluency, thus creating the want for unity, a holistic view enabled through perception of order and coherence between the parts of the whole.

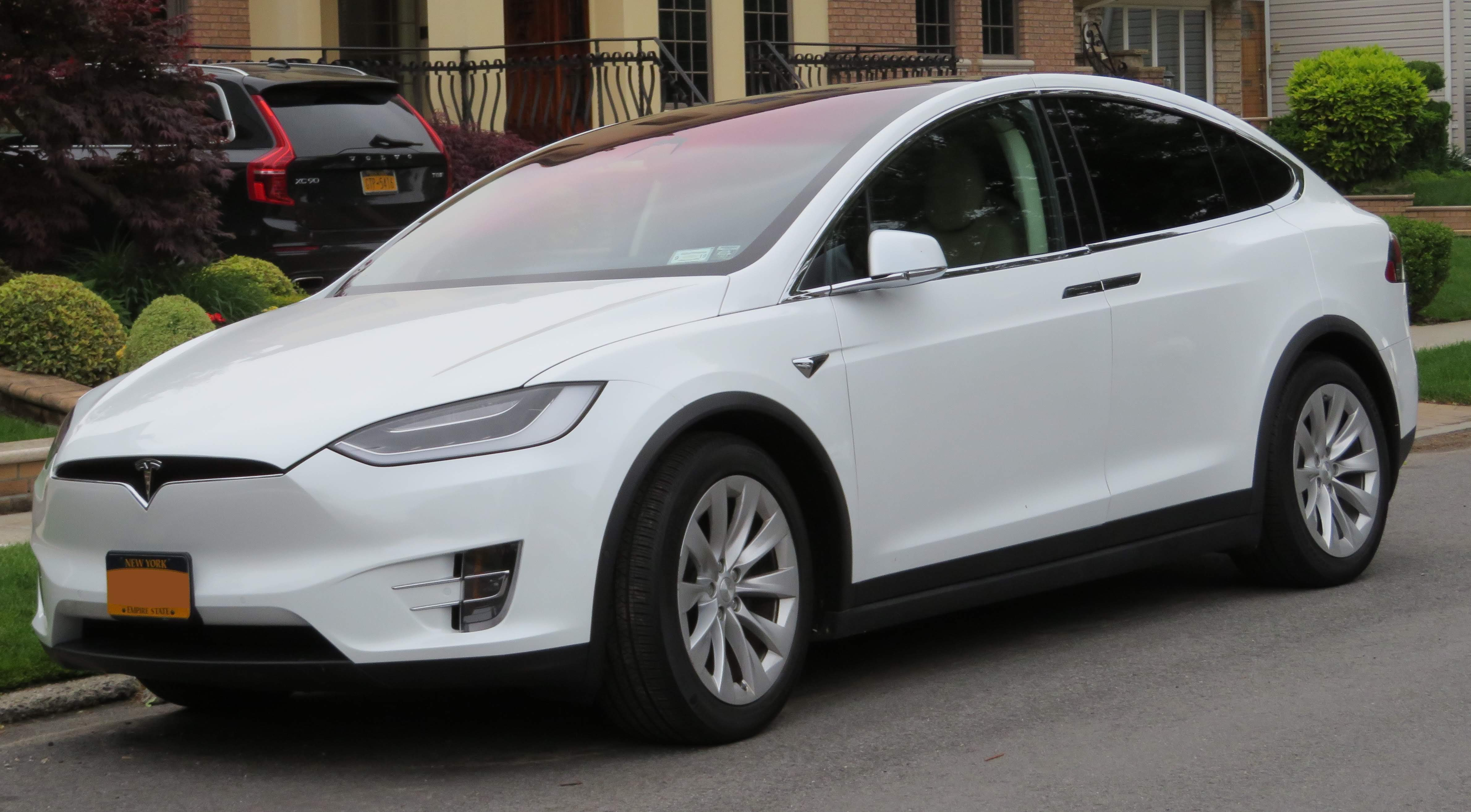
Tesla Model X: horizontal alignment of the door handles and the top of the headlight demonstrates the continuity aspect of the unity

In an example provided by Post et al., a car designer might choose to provide the variety through the use of a different color for the car door handles (contrast) while enforcing unity by placing similarly-shaped handles on a single line that can be visually extended to the headlights ("continuity").

== Psychological basis ==
A human ability to perceive spatial grouping and see a meaningful whole object can be explained from an evolutionary perspective (for example, an ability to reconstruct a partially hidden tiger from the visible pieces is quite advantageous). From the neurophysiological point of view, perceiving unity underlying the collection of disparate objects economizes the capacity of the brain, reducing the allocation of attentional resources.

== History ==
The principle can be traced to classical antiquity (cf. Plotinus, Enneads 1.6 and 5.8.1–2, c. 270 A.D.). Pre-Plotinus the term was not directly related to beauty, unity in diversity was assumed to be a fundamental property of the universe. Plotinus' ideas spread to Western thought during the late 15th century, when his writings were translated by Marsilio Ficino. The concept of unity in variety was further developed in the early 1700s by Francis Hutcheson, who declared that excitement is generated by "Uniformity amidst Variety", which generates a "disinterested" pleasure (i.e., the one with no regard for practical issues, like existence of the considered object or the wants of the body, like thirst). In the late 18th century Kant explained the feeling of beauty by "free play" of the human cognition, unshackled from the minutiae of reality and instead finding pleasure in a search of a unifying structure.

The concept of unity in variety was first applied to the empirical aesthetics in the end of the 19th century by Gustav Fechner as the "principle of unitary connection of the manifold": humans "tolerate most often and for the longest time a certain medium degree of arousal, which makes them feel neither overstimulated nor dissatisfied by a lack of sufficient occupation". Fechner thus started the a tradition of analysis of unity in variety as a hedonistic phenomenon.

In 1971 Daniel Berlyne and W. J. Boudewijns performed experiments studying unity in variety using visual patterns with similarities and differences. Their findings appear to confirm that liking of the images is at the peak when both unity (similarities between the parts) and variety (contrast) are applied. In 1938 Robert S. Woodworth proposed a unity in variety as an explanation of the golden section: square is all unity, narrow rectangle is a lot of variety, the pleasant appearance is somewhere in between (the debate about this idea was still ongoing in the 1990s). The end of the 20th century brought interest in precise definitions of unity and diversity, this purely cognitive analysis breaks with the Fechner's hedonistic approach. Kathleen Moore in 1986 had associated the unity with spatial frequency.

== See also ==
- Wabi-sabi

== Sources ==
- Hekkert, Paul (2006). "Design aesthetics: Principles of pleasure in design" (PDF). Psychology Science. 48 (2): 157–172.
- Post, R.A.G.; Blijlevens, J.; Hekkert, P. (2016). "'To preserve unity while almost allowing for chaos': Testing the aesthetic principle of unity-in-variety in product design". Acta Psychologica. 163. Elsevier BV: 142–152. doi:10.1016/j.actpsy.2015.11.013. ISSN 0001-6918. PMID 26687018.
- Gál, Ota (2022). Plotinus on Beauty: beauty as illuminated unity in multiplicity. Studies in Platonism, Neoplato. Leiden Boston (Mass.): Brill Publishing. ISBN 978-90-04-51019-7.
- Cupchik, Gerald C.; Winston, Andrew S. (1996). "Confluence and divergence in empirical aesthetics, philosophy, and mainstream psychology". Handbook of perception and cognition: Cognitive ecology. pp. 61–85.
- Berlyne, D. E.; Boudewijns, W. J. (1971). "Hedonic effects of uniformity in variety". Canadian Journal of Psychology. 25 (3). American Psychological Association (APA): 195–206. doi:10.1037/h0082381. ISSN 0008-4255. PMID 5088845.
