= Unity, Georgia =

Unincorporated community in Georgia, U.S.

Coordinates: 34°22′32.37″N 83°19′28.57″W

Unity is an unincorporated community in Franklin County, in the U.S. state of Georgia.

== History ==
The name "Unity" is biblical in origin; it is mentioned in Ephesians 4.
