= United! (novel) =

1973 novel by Michael Hardcastle

- First edition
- Author: Michael Hardcastle
- Language: English
- Genre: Novel
- Publisher: Methuen
- Publication date: 1973
- Publication place: United Kingdom
- Pages: 128 pp (paperback)
- ISBN: 0-416-79840-3

United! is a 1973 children's novel by British author Michael Hardcastle. It is the second in a series of books focusing on the fortunes of a youth football team Bank Vale United.

== Plot summary ==
United! follows youth football team Bank Vale United's attempts to improve their fortunes by buying a player from a rival team. Despite the fact that their team is amateur, United's impetuous striker Kevin Ripley believes there is no reason why they cannot pay for someone to come and join them. Kevin's teammates Keith Nash and Gary Ansell, although sceptical, agree to the plan and the boys manage to raise the princely sum of £1 to purchase the talents of Nick Abel-Smith.

Despite Nick's ability, he is an influence on the Bank Vale players, who have to make a choice between success and loyalty.
