= Unity (peer education project) =

Unity is peer education project started in 1996 by Jaap Jamin at the large Amsterdam-based addiction prevention and treatment organisation Jellinek. It has steadily grown to become the Netherlands' largest nightlife peer education initiative, and has similarities with initiatives such as DanceSafe in the United States.

== Background ==
In the Netherlands in the early nineties, the underground dance scene became more mainstream. The observed high prevalence of substances in nightlife settings prompted the development of a new health promotion initiative: the Unity peer education project. Although initially funded as a European Union project, as a best practice Unity quickly became a structural part of its mother organisation, Jellinek Prevention. In 2005 and 2006, a manual was published, and promoted to encourage wider adoption of this technique.

== Quality label ==
Although initially conceived as an intervention largely shaped by the peer educators, over the years principles from systematic intervention development, specifically the Intervention Mapping protocol, were implemented to ensure that Unity was theory- and evidence based. In 2011, Unity requested and was granted the quality label "well developed" by the Dutch health promotion watchdog organisation Centrum Gezond Leven.

== International health promotion ==
As the nightlife crowd in Amsterdam became more and more international, Unity has produced a number of international health promotion interventions. Most of these targeted mainly knowledge and awareness, such as a movie explaining Dutch drug policy to tourists. These have generally been well received.
