= Lowell, Oregon =

- City
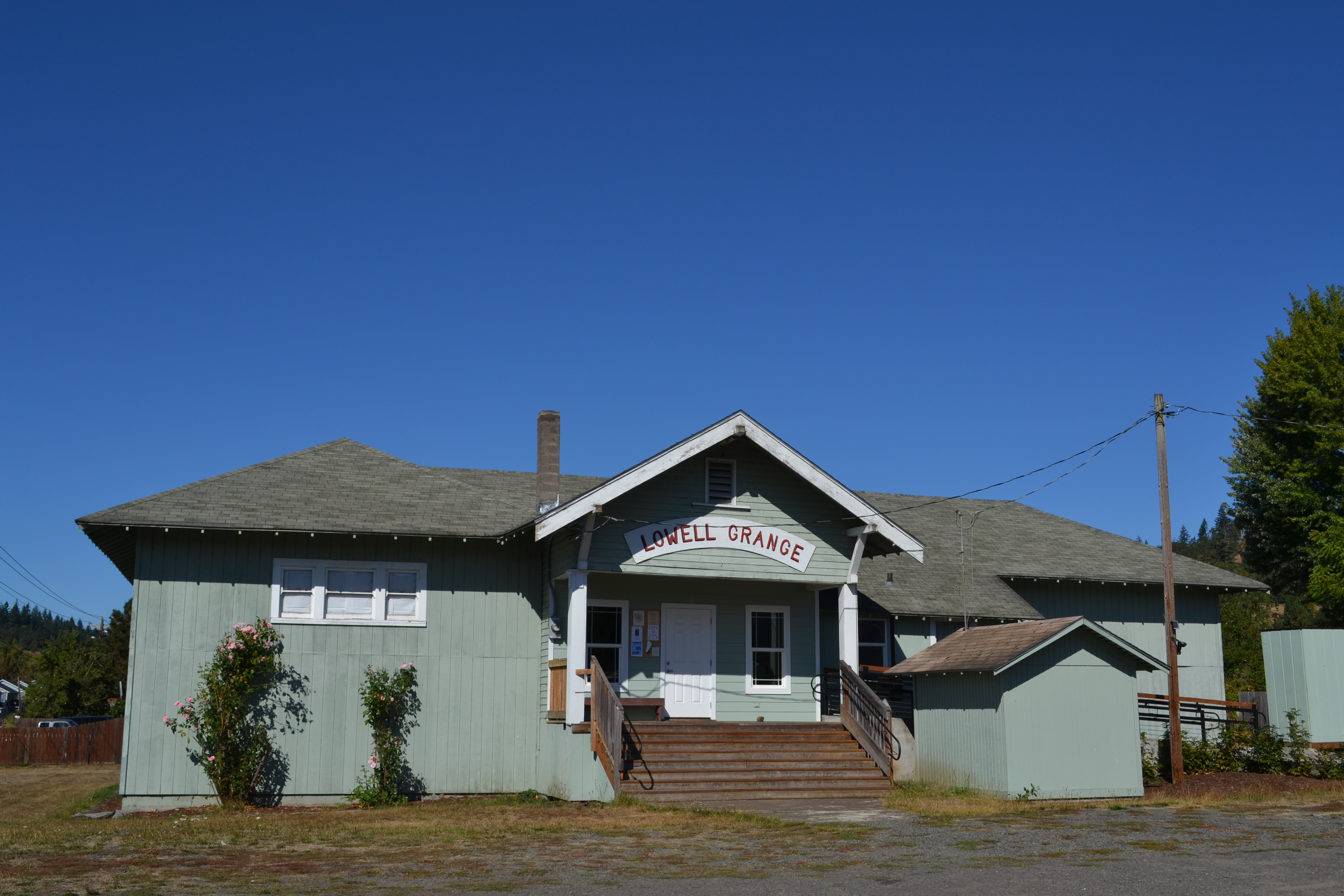
- The Lowell Grange

- Location in Oregon
- Coordinates: 43°55′15″N 122°46′55″W
- Country: United States
- State: Oregon
- County: Lane
- Incorporated: 1954

Area
  - Total: 1.18 sq mi (3.06 km^{2})
  - Land: 0.86 sq mi (2.24 km^{2})
  - Water: 0.32 sq mi (0.82 km^{2})
- Elevation: 748 ft (228 m)

Population (2020)
  - Total: 1,196
  - Density: 1,382.2/sq mi (533.68/km^{2})
- Time zone: UTC-8 (Pacific)
  - Summer (DST): UTC-7 (Pacific)
- ZIP code: 97452
- Area codes: 541 and 458
- FIPS code: 41-44050
- GNIS feature ID: 2410889
- Website: www.lowelloregon.gov

Lowell is a city in Lane County, in the U.S. state of Oregon. As of the 2020 census, Lowell had a population of 1,196. The city is on the north shore of Dexter Reservoir on the Middle Fork Willamette River. The most used route to Lowell is along Lowell Bridge, a covered bridge that crosses the reservoir from Oregon Route 58.

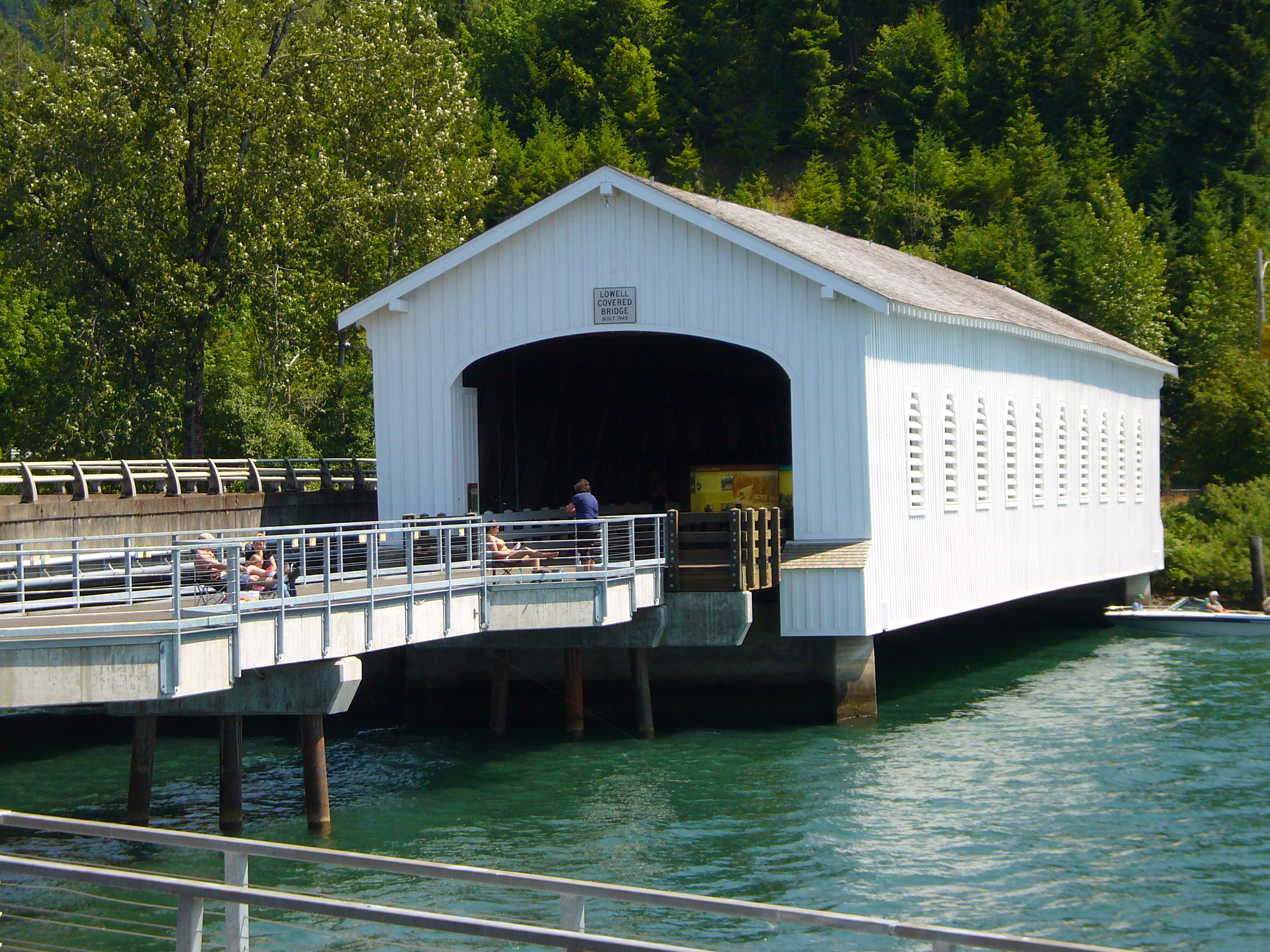
Lowell Covered Bridge

== History ==
A post office called Lowell has been in operation since 1883. The city was named after Lowell, Maine. The city was founded by Oregon pioneer Amos Damon Hyland of Illinois.

== Geography ==
According to the United States Census Bureau, the city has a total area of 1.19 square miles (3.08 km^{2}), of which, 0.87 square miles (2.25 km^{2}) is land and 0.32 square miles (0.83 km^{2}) is water. The town of Lowell is surrounded by three reservoirs, respectively Dexter, Lookout Point, and Fall Creek. This makes the town a popular recreation area for people from Eugene and Springfield.

=== Climate ===
The climate of Lowell differs slightly from that of Eugene, which is at lower elevation. Lowell receives 8 inches (20 cm) more of rain and 2 inches (51 mm) more of snow per year than Eugene. In central Lane County, that two inches is significant considering the lack of snow. The higher areas of the town receive more snow and rain as well. Wedged among three reservoirs, it experiences thick winter fog.

Climate data for Lookout Point Dam, Oregon (1991–2020 normals, extremes 1969–present)
Month	Jan	Feb	Mar	Apr	May	Jun	Jul	Aug	Sep	Oct	Nov	Dec	Year
Record high °F (°C)	71 (22)	73 (23)	79 (26)	85 (29)	93 (34)	111 (44)	102 (39)	106 (41)	101 (38)	89 (32)	74 (23)	72 (22)	111 (44)
Mean maximum °F (°C)	60.5 (15.8)	63.1 (17.3)	70.3 (21.3)	76.0 (24.4)	82.6 (28.1)	87.2 (30.7)	93.1 (33.9)	93.0 (33.9)	89.2 (31.8)	77.5 (25.3)	66.1 (18.9)	60.7 (15.9)	95.9 (35.5)
Mean daily maximum °F (°C)	46.9 (8.3)	50.3 (10.2)	54.2 (12.3)	58.5 (14.7)	64.9 (18.3)	70.8 (21.6)	79.8 (26.6)	80.0 (26.7)	74.2 (23.4)	62.8 (17.1)	52.0 (11.1)	46.0 (7.8)	61.7 (16.5)
Daily mean °F (°C)	42.0 (5.6)	44.1 (6.7)	47.0 (8.3)	50.5 (10.3)	55.8 (13.2)	60.8 (16.0)	67.2 (19.6)	67.3 (19.6)	63.2 (17.3)	55.0 (12.8)	46.7 (8.2)	41.5 (5.3)	53.4 (11.9)
Mean daily minimum °F (°C)	37.1 (2.8)	37.8 (3.2)	39.8 (4.3)	42.5 (5.8)	46.7 (8.2)	50.7 (10.4)	54.7 (12.6)	54.5 (12.5)	52.2 (11.2)	47.2 (8.4)	41.5 (5.3)	36.9 (2.7)	45.1 (7.3)
Mean minimum °F (°C)	26.5 (−3.1)	28.4 (−2.0)	31.5 (−0.3)	34.8 (1.6)	37.0 (2.8)	42.9 (6.1)	47.5 (8.6)	47.3 (8.5)	43.9 (6.6)	37.2 (2.9)	31.0 (−0.6)	26.2 (−3.2)	21.9 (−5.6)
Record low °F (°C)	6 (−14)	7 (−14)	22 (−6)	28 (−2)	30 (−1)	36 (2)	40 (4)	42 (6)	33 (1)	26 (−3)	16 (−9)	3 (−16)	3 (−16)
Average precipitation inches (mm)	6.06 (154)	4.64 (118)	5.14 (131)	4.83 (123)	3.52 (89)	2.04 (52)	0.51 (13)	0.56 (14)	1.63 (41)	3.65 (93)	6.41 (163)	7.04 (179)	46.03 (1,169)
Average snowfall inches (cm)	0.4 (1.0)	0.2 (0.51)	0.0 (0.0)	0.0 (0.0)	0.0 (0.0)	0.0 (0.0)	0.0 (0.0)	0.0 (0.0)	0.0 (0.0)	0.0 (0.0)	0.0 (0.0)	0.0 (0.0)	0.6 (1.5)
Average precipitation days (≥ 0.01 in)	19.3	17.0	19.4	18.6	13.6	9.2	3.4	3.7	6.5	13.1	18.6	19.8	162.2
Average snowy days (≥ 0.1 in)	0.1	0.1	0.0	0.0	0.0	0.0	0.0	0.0	0.0	0.0	0.0	0.0	0.2
Source: NOAA

== Demographics ==
Historical population
Census	Pop.	Note	%±
1960	503		—
1970	567		12.7%
1980	661		16.6%
1990	785		18.8%
2000	857		9.2%
2010	1,045		21.9%
2020	1,196		14.4%
U.S. Decennial Census

=== 2020 census ===
As of the 2020 census, Lowell had a population of 1,196. The median age was 40.3 years. 24.4% of residents were under the age of 18 and 18.6% of residents were 65 years of age or older. For every 100 females there were 99.0 males, and for every 100 females age 18 and over there were 92.3 males age 18 and over.

As of the 2020 census, 0% of residents lived in urban areas, while 100.0% lived in rural areas.

As of the 2020 census, there were 437 households in Lowell, of which 36.4% had children under the age of 18 living in them. Of all households, 54.2% were married-couple households, 15.1% were households with a male householder and no spouse or partner present, and 23.1% were households with a female householder and no spouse or partner present. About 18.5% of all households were made up of individuals and 7.8% had someone living alone who was 65 years of age or older.

As of the 2020 census, there were 467 housing units, of which 6.4% were vacant. Among occupied housing units, 77.3% were owner-occupied and 22.7% were renter-occupied. The homeowner vacancy rate was 1.7% and the rental vacancy rate was 2.9%.

Racial composition as of the 2020 census
Race	Number	Percent
White	1,051	87.9%
Black or African American	3	0.3%
American Indian and Alaska Native	11	0.9%
Asian	4	0.3%
Native Hawaiian and Other Pacific Islander	1	0.1%
Some other race	33	2.8%
Two or more races	93	7.8%
Hispanic or Latino (of any race)	61	5.1%

=== 2010 census ===
As of the census of 2010, there were 1,045 people, 397 households, and 298 families living in the city. The population density was 1,201.1 inhabitants per square mile (463.7/km^{2}). There were 436 housing units at an average density of 501.1 per square mile (193.5/km^{2}). The racial makeup of the city was 90.9% White, 1.7% Native American, 0.7% Asian, 0.7% from other races, and 6.0% from two or more races. Hispanic or Latino of any race were 3.5% of the population.

There were 397 households, of which 35.8% had children under the age of 18 living with them, 58.9% were married couples living together, 10.1% had a female householder with no husband present, 6.0% had a male householder with no wife present, and 24.9% were non-families. 19.1% of all households were made up of individuals, and 3.3% had someone living alone who was 65 years of age or older. The average household size was 2.63 and the average family size was 2.97.

The median age in the city was 39 years. 27.5% of residents were under the age of 18; 4% were between the ages of 18 and 24; 26.8% were from 25 to 44; 32.7% were from 45 to 64; and 9.1% were 65 years of age or older. The gender makeup of the city was 50.8% male and 49.2% female.

=== 2000 census ===
As of the census of 2000, there were 857 people, 315 households, and 236 families living in the city. The population density was 930.3 inhabitants per square mile (359.2/km^{2}). There were 342 housing units at an average density of 371.2 per square mile (143.3/km^{2}). The racial makeup of the city was 91.83% White, 1.98% Native American, 0.23% Asian, 0.23% Pacific Islander, 1.28% from other races, and 4.43% from two or more races. Hispanic or Latino of any race were 4.55% of the population. There were 315 households, out of which 37.5% had children under the age of 18 living with them, 58.4% were married couples living together, 13.0% had a female householder with no husband present, and 24.8% were non-families. 18.7% of all households were made up of individuals, and 6.7% had someone living alone who was 65 years of age or older. The average household size was 2.72 and the average family size was 3.10.

In the city, the population was 27.9% under the age of 18, 10.5% from 18 to 24, 29.6% from 25 to 44, 23.8% from 45 to 64, and 8.2% who were 65 years of age or older. The median age was 34 years. For every 100 females, there were 96.6 males. For every 100 females age 18 and over, there were 98.1 males. The median income for a household in the city was $35,536, and the median income for a family was $41,563. Males had a median income of $31,484 versus $18,125 for females. The per capita income for the city was $14,078. 11.5% of the population and 8.3% of families were below the poverty line. 18.6% of those under the age of 18 and 2.8% of those 65 and older were living below the poverty line.

== See also ==
- Jones Fire
