= United, West Virginia =

- Unincorporated community
- Location within West Virginia and the United States United (the United States)
- Coordinates: 37°59′26″N 81°25′35″W
- Country: United States
- State: West Virginia
- County: Kanawha
- Elevation: 1,401 ft (427 m)
- Time zone: UTC-5 (Eastern (EST))
  - Summer (DST): UTC-4 (EDT)
- GNIS ID: 1555854

United is an unincorporated community and coal town in Kanawha County, West Virginia, United States.
