= United Bank (Atlanta metropolitan area) =

Bank in Zebulon, Georgia, United States

- Company type: Private company
- Industry: Financial services
- Founded: 1905; 121 years ago
- Headquarters: Zebulon, Georgia, United States
- Number of locations: 18 branches
- Area served: Metro Atlanta Area
- Services: Banking services
- Owner: Edwards Family, employees, and outside shareholders.
- Divisions: 23
- Website: www.accessunited.com

United Bank is an American community bank based in the Metro Atlanta Area. The bank was first established in Zebulon, Georgia as the Bank of Zebulon in 1905. In 1986, took on the United Bank name that it still uses today. United Bank has over twenty one offices south of the Metro Atlanta area.

== History ==
=== Foundation ===
In 1905, the Bank of Zebulon was founded by a group of local business men from Zebulon, Georgia. In the middle of the Great Depression many banks were failing and losing hope that economic system of the United States would soon overcome this downfall. During this time, however, United Bank (then the Bank of Zebulon) became the 172nd bank in the nation to become a member of the Federal Deposit Insurance Corporation (FDIC) in 1935.

=== Milestones ===
In 1972, Lamar State Bank of Barnesville, Georgia was established. This was one of the first new branches taken on by what was later the United Bank Corporation. By 1981, United Bank Corporation was formed as a holding company for its additional banks and branches. At this point, the only banks included in this were the Bank of Zebulon and Lamar State Bank. In the mid 1980s the banks owned by the United Bank Corporation changed their names to United Bank and the mortgage division of United Bank was established. By 1990, United Bank continued to expand with its purchase of First Federal Bank in Griffin, Georgia. Throughout the mid 1990s, United Bank began to provide bank branches within grocery stores and a local call center that provided full customer service over the phone. In 1997 United Bank provided a division of the bank for investment management and also acquired the offices in Thomaston, Georgia of NationsBank, N.A.

Over the years, United Bank not only opened up new branches on its own, but also bought out many failing banks in the area. In 2004, United Bank opened an additional branch in the historic district of Madison, Georgia. The opening of this division expanded the number of customers that banked with United Bank.

By 2007, two additional branches were opened bringing United Bank in to the Covington, Georgia area. In the next two years, United Bank acquired the deposits of First Georgia Community Bank in Jackson and Locust Grove and First Coweta Bank creating new United Bank branches in Newnan, Hogansville, and Whitesburg, Georgia.

At the start of 2010, United Bank joined the Presto! Network, which allows unlimited and free ATM transactions at over one thousand Publix Supermarket stores. At the end of 2010, an additional branch of United Bank had been opened in Griffin, Georgia. The deposits of First National Bank of Barnesville were also assumed by United Bank, which brought in additional business. In 2011, a new office was added in the Covington area.
