= Lowell, Maine =

Town in Maine, United States

- Town
- Location within Maine Location within the United States
- Coordinates: 45°14′15″N 68°30′32″W
- Country: United States
- State: Maine
- County: Penobscot

Area
  - Total: 40.23 sq mi (104.20 km^{2})
  - Land: 38.29 sq mi (99.17 km^{2})
  - Water: 1.94 sq mi (5.02 km^{2})
- Elevation: 499 ft (152 m)

Population (2020)
  - Total: 368
  - Density: 9.6/sq mi (3.7/km^{2})
- Time zone: UTC-5 (Eastern (EST))
  - Summer (DST): UTC-4 (EDT)
- ZIP code: 04493
- Area code: 207
- FIPS code: 23-41435
- GNIS feature ID: 582569
- Website: lowellme.org

Lowell is a town in Penobscot County, Maine, United States. The population was 368 at the 2020 census.

== History ==
The town was named for Lowell Hayden, the first child born here.

== Geography ==
According to the United States Census Bureau, the town has a total area of 40.23 square miles (104.20 km^{2}), of which 38.29 square miles (99.17 km^{2}) is land and 1.94 square miles (5.02 km^{2}) is water.

== Demographics ==
Historical population
Census	Pop.	Note	%±
1840	205		—
1850	378		84.4%
1860	556		47.1%
1870	448		−19.4%
1880	433		−3.3%
1890	439		1.4%
1900	300		−31.7%
1910	259		−13.7%
1920	212		−18.1%
1930	161		−24.1%
1940	161		0.0%
1950	192		19.3%
1960	132		−31.2%
1970	154		16.7%
1980	194		26.0%
1990	267		37.6%
2000	291		9.0%
2010	358		23.0%
2020	368		2.8%
U.S. Decennial Census

=== 2010 census ===
As of the census of 2010, there were 358 people, 154 households, and 117 families living in the town. The population density was 9.3 inhabitants per square mile (3.6/km^{2}). There were 315 housing units at an average density of 8.2 per square mile (3.2/km^{2}). The racial makeup of the town was 97.2% White, 0.8% Asian, 0.3% from other races, and 1.7% from two or more races. Hispanic or Latino of any race were 0.3% of the population.

There were 154 households, of which 21.4% had children under the age of 18 living with them, 65.6% were married couples living together, 3.9% had a female householder with no husband present, 6.5% had a male householder with no wife present, and 24.0% were non-families. 16.2% of all households were made up of individuals, and 4.5% had someone living alone who was 65 years of age or older. The average household size was 2.32 and the average family size was 2.54.

The median age in the town was 51.5 years. 14.8% of residents were under the age of 18; 3.9% were between the ages of 18 and 24; 19% were from 25 to 44; 40.5% were from 45 to 64; and 21.8% were 65 years of age or older. The gender makeup of the town was 51.4% male and 48.6% female.

=== 2000 census ===
As of the census of 2000, there were 291 people, 120 households, and 90 families living in the town. The population density was 7.6 inhabitants per square mile (2.9/km^{2}). There were 234 housing units at an average density of 6.1 per square mile (2.4/km^{2}). The racial makeup of the town was 98.97% White, 0.69% Asian, and 0.34% from two or more races.

There were 120 households, out of which 30.8% had children under the age of 18 living with them, 62.5% were married couples living together, 5.0% had a female householder with no husband present, and 25.0% were non-families. 21.7% of all households were made up of individuals, and 5.8% had someone living alone who was 65 years of age or older. The average household size was 2.43 and the average family size was 2.74.

In the town, the population was spread out, with 19.9% under the age of 18, 10.7% from 18 to 24, 29.6% from 25 to 44, 30.9% from 45 to 64, and 8.9% who were 65 years of age or older. The median age was 41 years. For every 100 females, there were 117.2 males. For every 100 females age 18 and over, there were 106.2 males.

The median income for a household in the town was $31,500, and the median income for a family was $45,750. Males had a median income of $35,714 versus $19,750 for females. The per capita income for the town was $19,137. About 9.9% of families and 15.1% of the population were below the poverty line, including 7.7% of those under the age of eighteen and none of those 65 or over.
