= Jasper, Oregon =

Unincorporated community in the state of Oregon, United States

- Census-designated place
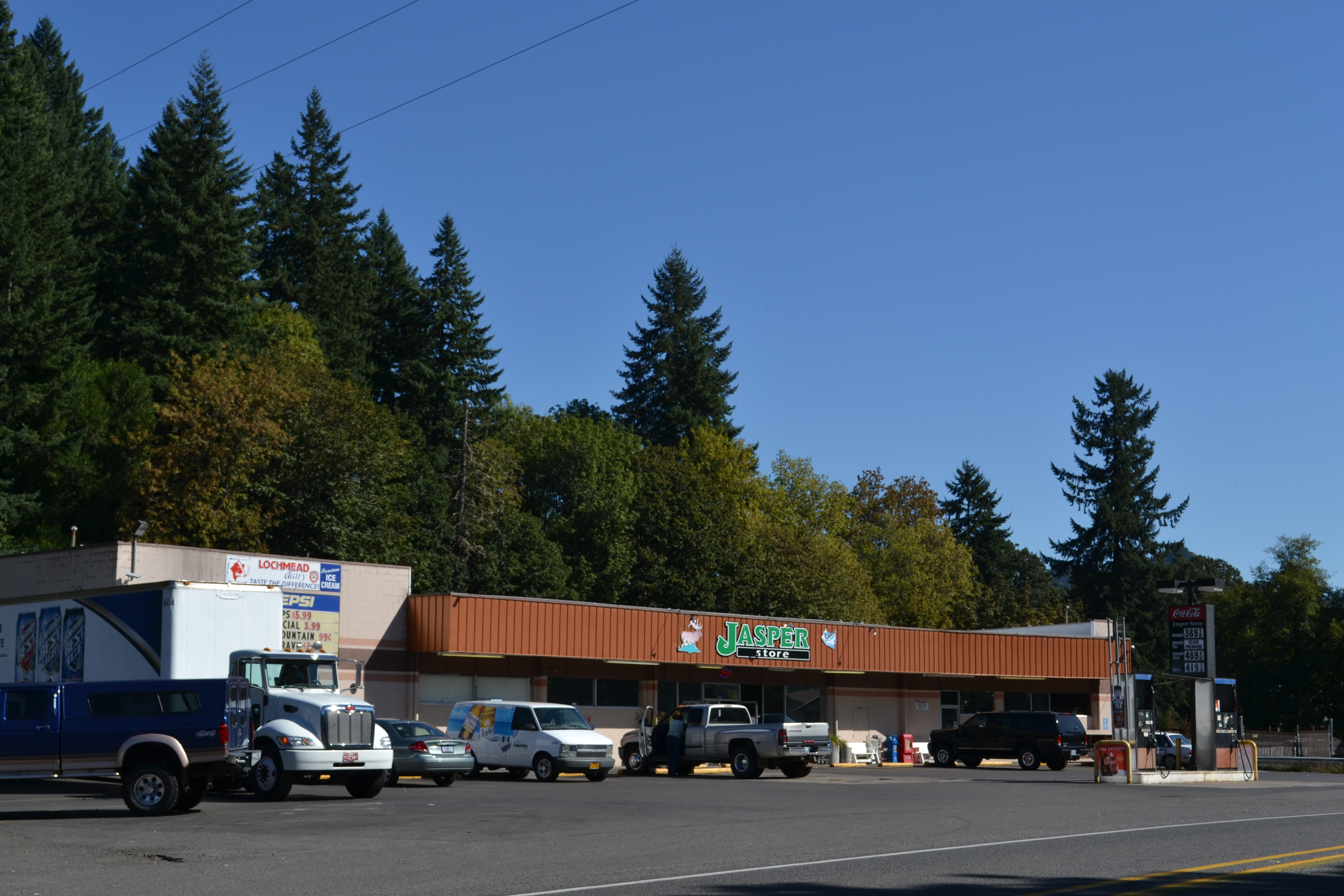
- Store in Jasper

- Location within Oregon Location within the United States
- Coordinates: 43°59′48″N 122°54′42″W
- Country: United States
- State: Oregon
- County: Lane

Area
  - Total: 2.72 sq mi (7.04 km^{2})
  - Land: 2.66 sq mi (6.90 km^{2})
  - Water: 0.058 sq mi (0.15 km^{2})
- Elevation: 545 ft (166 m)

Population (2020)
  - Total: 793
  - Density: 300/sq mi (115/km^{2})
- Time zone: UTC-8 (Pacific (PST))
  - Summer (DST): UTC-7 (PDT)
- ZIP code: 97438
- Area codes: 458 and 541
- FIPS code: 41-37150
- GNIS feature ID: 2812882

Jasper is an unincorporated community and census-designated place (CDP) in Lane County, Oregon, United States. It is southeast of Springfield on Oregon Route 222, at the confluence of Hills Creek and the Middle Fork Willamette River. As of the 2020 census, Jasper had a population of 793.

Jasper was the site of a siding of the Southern Pacific Railroad's Cascade Line (now part of the Union Pacific Railroad), which was named for local resident Jasper B. Hills, the son of Cornelius Joel Hills, who settled at the locale in 1846. The Jasper post office was established in 1884.

Jasper State Recreation Site, a state park, is south of Jasper.

Jasper is served by the Pleasant Hill School District.

== Demographics ==
Historical population
Census	Pop.	Note	%±
2020	793		—
U.S. Decennial Census
