= Deaths in March 2019 =

The following is a list of notable deaths in March 2019.

Entries for each day are listed alphabetically by surname. A typical entry lists information in the following sequence:

- Name, age, country of citizenship at birth, subsequent country of citizenship (if applicable), reason for notability, cause of death (if known), and reference.

== March 2019 ==
=== 1 ===
- Zhores Alferov, 88, Russian physicist and politician, MP (since 1995), Nobel Prize laureate (2000).
- Kumar Bhattacharyya, Baron Bhattacharyya, 78, British-Indian engineer, educator and government advisor, member of the House of Lords (since 2004).
- Jawaid Bhutto, 64, Pakistani philosopher, shot.
- Dhritikanta Lahiri Choudhury, 87, Indian naturalist.
- Joseph Flummerfelt, 82, American conductor, stroke.
- Håkon Wexelsen Freihow, 91, Norwegian diplomat, Ambassador to Japan (1981–1989) and Portugal (1992–1995).
- Phaedon Georgitsis, 80, Greek actor (The Red Lanterns, Blood on the Land, Marijuana Stop!), brain cancer.
- Maïmouna Kane, 82, Senegalese jurist and politician, Minister of Social Development (1983–1986).
- Sibusiso Khwinana, 25, South African actor, stabbed.
- Ivars Knēts, 80, Latvian engineer and educator.
- Ludo Loos, 64, Belgian racing cyclist.
- Elly Mayday, 30, Canadian model and women's health advocate, ovarian cancer.
- Eusebio Pedroza, 65, Panamanian Hall of Fame boxer, WBA featherweight champion (1978–1985), pancreatic cancer.
- Kevin Roche, 96, Irish-born American architect, Pritzker Prize winner (1982).
- Polan Sarkar, 97, Bangladeshi literacy activist.
- Mahadi Sinambela, 71, Indonesian politician, Minister of Youth and Sport (1999–2000).
- Robert S. Summers, 85, American legal scholar.
- Mike Tamoaieta, 23, Samoan-born New Zealand rugby union player (Blues, North Harbour).
- Peter van Gestel, 81, Dutch author.
- Mike Willesee, 76, Australian television journalist (This Day Tonight, Four Corners, A Current Affair), throat cancer.
- Paul Williams, 78, English singer (Zoot Money's Big Roll Band, Juicy Lucy, Allan Holdsworth).
- Hennric Yeboah, 62, Ghanaian politician, MP (2004–2015).

=== 2 ===
- Bharat Mohan Adhikari, 82, Nepalese politician, Minister of Finance (1994–1995), pneumonia.
- Derek Aikman, 59, Belizean politician, MP (1984–1992).
- Reinhold Aman, 82, German-born American chemical engineer and linguist.
- Arnulf Baring, 86, German political scientist, historian and author.
- Yannis Behrakis, 58, Greek photojournalist, cancer.
- Keith Davis, 88, New Zealand rugby union player (Auckland, New Zealand Māori, national team).
- Peter Dvorsky, 70, Canadian actor (Videodrome, The Dead Zone, Twins).
- John E. Gallagher, 61, American television director (ER, Criminal Minds, The Good Wife), cardiac arrest.
- Liam Gilmartin, 97, Irish Gaelic footballer (St. Dominics).
- Jack Gregory, 74, American football player (Cleveland Browns, New York Giants).
- Tullio Gregory, 90, Italian philosopher.
- Al Hazan, 84, American pianist (B. Bumble and the Stingers), songwriter and record producer.
- David Held, 68, British political scientist.
- Fred Hill, 84, American baseball coach (Rutgers University).
- Med Hondo, 83, Mauritanian-French film director (Soleil O, Sarraounia), screenwriter and actor (1871).
- Ed Keats, 104, American rear admiral, complications from a fall.
- János Koós, 81, Hungarian singer, parodist and actor.
- Franco Macri, 88, Italian-born Argentine businessman.
- Keith Harvey Miller, 94, American politician, Alaska Secretary of State (1966–1969) and Governor (1969–1970), pancreatic cancer.
- Colleen Mulvihill, 66, American Olympic gymnast (1968).
- Andra Neiburga, 62, Latvian writer.
- Mike Oliver, 74, British disability rights activist.
- Ogden Reid, 93, American publisher, diplomat, and politician, Ambassador to Israel (1959–1961) and member of the U.S. House of Representatives (1963–1975).
- Werner Schneyder, 82, Austrian writer, director and actor.
- Beatriz Taibo, 88, Argentine actress.
- Don Todd, 77, American football coach.
- Rafael Torija de la Fuente, 91, Spanish Roman Catholic prelate, Auxiliary Bishop of Santander (1969–1976) and Bishop of Ciudad Real (1976–2003).
- Otto Trefný, 87, Czech politician, MP, physician of the national ice hockey team, member of the Czech Ice Hockey Hall of Fame.

=== 3 ===
- Tom Bass, 92, American politician.
- John Bloom, 87, English entrepreneur (Rolls Razor).
- Harry Bowman, 69, American criminal, president of Outlaws Motorcycle Club.
- Leo de Castro, 70, New Zealand singer and guitarist.
- Bobbi Fiedler, 81, American politician, member of the U.S. House of Representatives (1981–1987).
- Kyle Forti, 29, American political consultant, helicopter crash.
- David Gadsby, 71, British physiologist.
- Martí Galindo, 81, Spanish stage actor.
- José García Ladrón de Guevara, 89, Spanish poet and journalist, Senator (1979–2000).
- Elva Martha García Rocha, 72, Mexican politician, founder of the Party of the Democratic Revolution and member of the Legislative Assembly of Mexico City (1997–2000).
- Ben Hamilton-Baillie, 63, British architect, cancer.
- John Howlett, 78, English screenwriter and author.
- Peter Hurford, 88, British organist and composer, complications from Alzheimer's disease.
- Mark Klempner, 63, American folklorist.
- Robert Knuckle, 84, Canadian author.
- Lee Wen, 61, Singaporean performance artist, lung infection.
- Richard Lewis, 79, Australian politician.
- JoAnn M. Tenorio, 76, American entomologist.
- Roger W. Titus, 77, American senior judge, U.S. District Judge for Maryland (since 2003), liposarcoma.
- Uroš Tošković, 86, Montenegrin painter.
- Frances Yerxa, 101, American author.

=== 4 ===
- Ann Stewart Anderson, 84, American artist.
- John Ashman, 92, English cricketer.
- King Kong Bundy, 63, American professional wrestler (WCCW, WWF) and actor (Married... with Children), complications from diabetes.
- Eric Caldow, 84, Scottish footballer (Rangers, national team).
- Les Carlyon, 76, Australian writer and newspaper editor (The Age, The Herald).
- Vivian Cherry, 98, American photographer.
- Edward Collins, 78, Irish politician, TD (1969–1987).
- Juan Corona, 85, Mexican serial killer.
- Wilbur Cross, 100, American author.
- Garfield Davies, Baron Davies of Coity, 83, British trade unionist (USDAW) and life peer.
- Robert DeProspero, 80, American Secret Service agent, amyloidosis.
- Robert Wagner Dowling, 94, Canadian politician.
- Keith Flint, 49, English singer (The Prodigy), suicide by hanging.
- Art Hughes, 88, Canadian soccer player (Vancouver Firefighters).
- Klaus Kinkel, 82, German politician, Minister of Justice (1991–1992) and Foreign Affairs (1992–1998), Vice Chancellor (1993–1998).
- V. Dhananjay Kumar, 67, Indian politician, MP (1991–2004), Minister of Civil Aviation and Tourism (1996), kidney disease.
- Ted Lindsay, 93, Canadian Hall of Fame ice hockey player (Detroit Red Wings, Chicago Blackhawks).
- Mao Zhiyong, 89, Chinese politician, Party Secretary of Hunan and Jiangxi provinces, Vice Chairman of the CPPCC.
- Don Nice, 86, American painter.
- Luke Perry, 52, American actor (Beverly Hills, 90210, Riverdale, Buffy the Vampire Slayer), complications from a stroke.
- Dean Pryor, 88, American football player and decathlete (Arkansas Razorbacks).
- Albert Redhead, 77, Grenadian lawyer and jurist (Eastern Caribbean Supreme Court).
- Anthony Ríos, 68, Dominican actor and singer-songwriter, heart attack.
- Jean Starobinski, 98, Swiss literary critic.
- Michael Thomas, 66, British actor (Life Without George, The Boat That Rocked, Head over Heels), myeloma.
- Joe Lane Travis, 87, American politician.
- Maya Turovskaya, 94, Russian theatrical and film critic, film historian and screenwriter.
- Sidney Verba, 86, American political scientist and librarian.
- Rick Walters, 73, American tattoo artist.

=== 5 ===
- Richard Allen, 90, Canadian politician.
- Geoffrey Beck, 100, English cricketer (Oxfordshire) and Congregational minister.
- Chu Shijian, 91, Chinese tobacco executive (Hongtashan) and convicted embezzler, complications from diabetes.
- André Damien, 88, French lawyer and politician, Supreme Court Justice (1981–1997), mayor of Versailles (1977–1995), Deputy (1996–1997).
- Ding Yi, 91, Chinese engineer and business executive, founded Dongfang Electric.
- Moris Farhi, 84, Turkish author, Vice-President of PEN International (since 2001), heart disease.
- Khagen Gogoi, 92, Indian politician, MLA (1972–1978).
- Susan Harrison, 80, American actress (Sweet Smell of Success).
- Stephen Irwin, 79, Canadian architect.
- Aleksandra Kasuba, 95–96, Lithuanian-born American environmental artist.
- David Kear, 95, British-born New Zealand geologist and science administrator, director-general of the Department of Scientific and Industrial Research (1980–1983).
- Bernard Krisher, 87, German-born American journalist (Newsweek, Fortune) and philanthropist.
- Miroljub Lešo, 72, Serbian actor.
- Jacques Loussier, 84, French pianist and composer.
- Boro Maa, 100, Indian religious leader, matriarch of the Matua Mahasangha.
- Andrzej Mateja, 83, Polish Olympic skier (1956, 1960).
- Luis Matte Valdés, 85, Chilean politician, mayor of La Florida (1961–1964) and Minister of Housing and Urbanism (1972–1973).
- Jane Cahill Pfeiffer, 86, American business executive (NBC).
- Doru Popovici, 87, Romanian composer, musicologist and writer.
- Esteban Righi, 80, Argentine lawyer and politician, Minister of the Interior (1973) and Attorney General (2004–2012).
- Akemi Satō, 50, Japanese singer.
- Abraham Stavans, 86, Mexican actor (El Chavo del Ocho, Once Upon a Scoundrel, Original Sin) and theatre director.
- Yang Naisi, 91, Chinese linguist.

=== 6 ===
- Andrey Anufriyenko, 48, Russian Olympic speed skater (1994, 1998).
- Grayston Burgess, 86, English opera singer and conductor.
- Sir Simon Cassels, 91, British admiral, Second Sea Lord (1982–1986).
- Ernesto Horacio Crespo, 89, Argentine military officer, Chief of the General Staff of the Argentine Air Force (1985–1989).
- James Dapogny, 78, American jazz musicologist and pianist.
- Magenta Devine, 61, British television presenter (Rough Guide, Network 7).
- Alí Domínguez, 26, Venezuelan journalist and politician, beaten.
- Guillaume Faye, 69, French journalist and writer, cancer.
- Gaston Gambor, 70, Central African military officer, basketball player, and politician.
- Typist Gopu, 85, Indian actor.
- John Habgood, Baron Habgood, 91, British Anglican bishop, academic, and life peer, Bishop of Durham (1973–1983), Archbishop of York (1983–1995).
- Frances Heussenstamm, 90, American artist.
- Rachel Ingalls, 78, American author, multiple myeloma.
- Mai Chao-cheng, 77, Taiwanese economist, member of Academia Sinica.
- Gordon Osbaldeston, 88, Canadian civil servant.
- Charlie Panigoniak, 72, Canadian Inuktitut singer and guitarist.
- José Pedro Pérez-Llorca, 78, Spanish lawyer, diplomat and politician, Deputy (1977–1982) and Minister of Foreign Affairs (1980–1982), co-Father of the 1978 Constitution.
- Daniel Rudisha, 73, Kenyan sprinter, Olympic silver medalist (1968), heart attack.
- Carolee Schneemann, 79, American visual artist.
- Brian Sully, 82–83, Australian judge.

=== 7 ===
- Dick Beyer, 88, American Hall of Fame professional wrestler (AJPW, WWA, AWA).
- Joseph H. Boardman, 70, American railroad executive, president and CEO of Amtrak (2008–2016), complications from a stroke.
- Robert Braithwaite, 75, British marine engineer and executive, founder of Sunseeker.
- Johnny Brittain, 86–87, British motorcycle racer.
- Bobby Campbell, 77, Scottish footballer (Motherwell, St Mirren, Greenock Morton).
- Pino Caruso, 84, Italian actor (Malicious, The Sunday Woman, Street Kids).
- Kelly Catlin, 23, American cyclist, Olympic silver medalist (2016) and world champion (2016, 2017, 2018), suicide by asphyxiation.
- William J. Creber, 87, American art director and production designer (The Poseidon Adventure, The Towering Inferno, Planet of the Apes), complications from pneumonia.
- Raymond Donnez, 76, French music producer and conductor.
- Daniel de Fernando, 81, Spanish pharmacist and politician, Deputy (1977–1979), President of Ávila province (1979–1982, 1987–1991).
- Ralph Hall, 95, American politician, member of the U.S. House of Representatives (1981–2015) and the Texas Senate (1963–1973).
- Dan Jenkins, 90, American author and sportswriter (Sports Illustrated, Golf Digest, Playboy).
- Jarogniew Krüger, 72, German Olympic sailor.
- Kusalakumari, 83, Indian actress (Konjum Salangai, Koondukkili).
- Patrick Lane, 79, Canadian poet, heart attack.
- Hi Duk Lee, 79, Korean-born American grocer, restaurateur and hotelier, cancer.
- Sam Miller, 97, American realty executive (Forest City).
- Dick Nichols, 92, American politician, member of the U.S. House of Representatives (1991–1993).
- Carmine Persico, 85, American mobster and convicted racketeer, head of Colombo crime family (1973–1990, since 1993), complications from diabetes.
- Rosto, 50, Dutch artist and filmmaker, lung cancer.
- Ron Russell, 92, New Zealand-born Canadian politician, member (1978–2006) and Speaker (1998–1999) of the Nova Scotia House of Assembly.
- Sidney Sheinberg, 84, American lawyer and studio executive, President of MCA Inc. (1973–1995).
- Shen Ziyin, 91, Chinese physician and medical researcher, academician of the Chinese Academy of Sciences.
- Issei Suda, 78, Japanese photographer.
- Anne Sjerp Troelstra, 79, Dutch mathematician.

=== 8 ===
- Raoul Barrière, 91, French rugby union player (AS Béziers, national team) and coach (RC Narbonne).
- Marshall Brodien, 84, American magician and actor (The Bozo Show), complications from Alzheimer's disease.
- Mike Colbern, 63, American baseball player (Chicago White Sox).
- Nothando Dube, 31, Swazi royal, skin cancer.
- Michael Gielen, 91, Austrian conductor.
- D. Shelton A. Gunaratne, 79, Sri Lankan-born American academic.
- Cedrick Hardman, 70, American football player (San Francisco 49ers, Oakland Raiders).
- Roland Hedlund, 85, Swedish actor (Ådalen 31, The Hunters), stroke.
- Frank Joranko, 88, American football and baseball player and coach (Albion).
- Ian Lawrence, 82, Australian-born New Zealand politician, Mayor of Wellington (1983−1986), bowel cancer.
- David Martin, 89, British sociologist and Anglican priest.
- Mel Miller, 79, American lawyer and politician, member (1971−1991) and Speaker (1987−1991) of the New York State Assembly, lung cancer.
- George Morfogen, 85, American actor (Oz, V).
- Mesrob II Mutafyan of Constantinople, 62, Turkish religious leader, Armenian Patriarch of Constantinople (1998–2016), dementia.
- Jaume Muxart, 96, Spanish painter.
- Nate Ramsey, 77, American football player (Philadelphia Eagles, New Orleans Saints).
- Jason Reese, 51, British engineer.
- Frankie Smith, 65–66, American funk and R&B musician.
- Eddie Taylor Jr., 46, American blues singer and guitarist, heart failure.
- Cynthia Thompson, 96, Jamaican Olympic sprinter (1948) and CAC champion (1946).
- Mike Watterson, 76, English snooker player, promoter and commentator.

=== 9 ===
- Sveinung Aarnseth, 85, Norwegian footballer (Lyn, national team).
- Jed Allan, 84, American actor (Days of Our Lives, Santa Barbara, Lassie).
- Joe Auer, 77, American football player (Buffalo Bills, Miami Dolphins, Atlanta Falcons).
- Akhteruzzaman Babul, 63, Bangladeshi politician, MP (1988–1990).
- Anna Costanza Baldry, 48, Italian social psychologist and criminologist.
- Tom Ballard, 30, British rock climber, rock climbing accident. (body discovered on this date)
- George Benson, 90, American jazz saxophonist.
- Alberto Bucci, 70, Italian basketball coach (Fortitudo Bologna, Virtus Bologna, Scaligera Verona), cancer.
- Chokoleit, 48, Filipino actor (Love Spell, Marina, Asintado) and comedian, heart attack.
- Bernard Binlin Dadié, 103, Ivorian novelist, playwright and poet, Minister of Culture (1977–1986).
- Vladimir Etush, 96, Russian actor (Kidnapping, Caucasian Style, The Twelve Chairs, 31 June), People's Artist of the USSR (1984), heart failure.
- Patrick Grandperret, 72, French film director and screenwriter (Murderers).
- Heo Yong-mo, 53, South Korean boxer, stomach cancer.
- Stanley Hess, 95, American artist.
- Harry Howell, 86, Canadian Hall of Fame ice hockey player (New York Rangers, Los Angeles Kings).
- Jadwiga Janus, 87, Polish sculptor.
- Wenche Kvamme, 68, Norwegian actress, cancer.
- Robert Lemaître, 90, French footballer.
- Albert Marenčin, 96, Slovak writer, translator and screenwriter.
- Leonidas Ralph Mecham, 90, American lawyer, director of the Administrative Office of the United States Courts (1985–2006).
- Terry Millar, 70, American mathematician, pancreatic cancer.
- Abdul Ali Mridha, Bangladeshi politician.
- Cindy Ostmann, 80, American politician.
- Pierre de Saintignon, 70, French politician.
- Olatoye Temitope Sugar, 47, Nigerian politician, MP (since 2015), shot.
- Francesca Sundsten, 59, American bassist (The Beakers) and artist, lymphoma.
- Johnny Thompson, 84, American magician.
- Kevin Ward, 57, American baseball player (San Diego Padres), brain cancer.
- Wally Yamaguchi, 60, Japanese professional wrestling manager (AJPW, FMW, WWF), stroke.

=== 10 ===
- Edith Borroff, 93, American musicologist and composer.
- Anton Buteyko, 71, Ukrainian diplomat, Ambassador to the United States (1998–1999) and Romania (2000–2003).
- Karl Eller, 91, American advertising executive and retailer (Circle K).
- Josef Feistmantl, 80, Austrian luger, Olympic (1964), world (1969), and European (1967) champion.
- Russell Gary, 59, American football player (New Orleans Saints, Philadelphia Eagles), heart attack.
- Raven Grimassi, 67, American Wiccan priest and writer, pancreatic cancer.
- Louis Hailey, 93, Australian Olympic hockey player (1956, 1960).
- Charlie Karp, 65, American musician, songwriter and Emmy-winning documentarian.
- David B. Kennedy, 85, American politician.
- İrsen Küçük, 79, Cypriot politician, Prime Minister of Northern Cyprus (2010–2013), heart attack.
- Britta Lindmark, 89, Swedish Olympic skater (1952).
- Gordon McIntosh, 93, Scottish-born Australian politician, Senator (1974–1987).
- Eric Moss, 44, American football player (Minnesota Vikings, Scottish Claymores).
- Charles Mutschler, 63, American archivist, traffic collision.
- Gheorghe Naghi, 86, Romanian film director (Telegrame).
- William Powers Jr., 72, American educator, President of the University of Texas at Austin (2006–2015), complications from a fall.
- Al Silverman, 92, American sports writer.
- Alekos Spanoudakis, 91, Greek basketball player (Olympiacos).
- Paul Talalay, 95, German-born American pharmacologist, congestive heart failure.
- René Arnold Valero, 88, American Roman Catholic prelate, Auxiliary Bishop of Brooklyn, New York (1980–2005).
- Wei Maowen, 95, Chinese politician, Governor of Qiannan Buyei and Miao Autonomous Prefecture (1956–1966).
- Notable people killed in the crash of Ethiopian Airlines Flight 302:
  - Pius Adesanmi, 47, Nigerian-Canadian professor and writer.
  - Christine Alalo, 48–49, Ugandan police officer and peacekeeper (AMISOM).
  - Sebastiano Tusa, 66, Italian archaeologist and politician.

=== 11 ===
- Dave Aron, 54, American music producer.
- Yona Atari, 85, Israeli singer and actress (Rechov Sumsum), Alzheimer's disease.
- Danny Ben-Israel, 75, Israeli musician.
- Hal Blaine, 90, American Hall of Fame drummer (The Wrecking Crew).
- Martín Chirino, 94, Spanish sculptor.
- John Dawson, 91, New Zealand botanist and academic (Victoria University of Wellington).
- John T. Driscoll, 93, American politician.
- Willie Ellison, 73, American football player (Los Angeles Rams, Kansas City Chiefs).
- Helen Engle, 93, American conservationist, renal failure.
- Desmond Ford, 90, Australian evangelical theologian.
- Leetsch C. Hsu, 98, Chinese mathematician and educator.
- Saiful Azam Kashem, 71, Bangladeshi film director.
- Dzhemal Kherhadze, 74, Georgian footballer (Torpedo Kutaisi).
- Pertti Koivulahti, 67, Finnish ice hockey player (Tappara).
- Danny Kustow, 63, English rock guitarist (Tom Robinson Band), pneumonia and liver infection.
- Joe Rosenblatt, 85, Canadian poet.
- Edward Rubenstein, 94, American physician.
- Patrick Ruttle, 88, Canadian Olympic field hockey player (1964).
- Sundar Lal Tiwari, 61, Indian politician, MLA (since 2013), heart attack.
- Antônio Wilson Vieira Honório, 75, Brazilian football player (Santos, national team) and manager (Valeriodoce), world champion (1962), heart attack.
- Speros Vryonis, 90, American historian.
- Peter Wong Man-kong, 70, Hong Kong shipping magnate and politician, member of the National People's Congress (since 1993).
- Xing Shizhong, 80, Chinese general, President of the PLA National Defence University (1995–2002).

=== 12 ===
- John Bardo, 70, American educator, president of Wichita State University (since 2012), lung disease.
- Jim Beatty, 84, American jazz musician.
- Věra Bílá, 64, Czech singer, heart attack.
- Stu Briese, 72, Canadian politician, MLA (2007–2016).
- Thomas S. Carter, 97, American engineer, president of the Kansas City Southern Railway (1973–1986).
- Renato Cipollini, 73, Italian football player (SPAL, Atalanta) and executive, president of Bologna (2001–2004).
- Günter Dreyer, 75, German Egyptologist.
- Karl Fischer, 70, Hungarian-born Canadian architect.
- Joachim Mbadu Kikhela Kupika, 87, Congolese Roman Catholic prelate, Bishop of Boma (1975–2001).
- John Kilzer, 62, American singer and songwriter, suicide by hanging.
- Shelly Liebowitz, 73, American record executive, promoter, producer, and manager.
- Alberto Lois, 62, Dominican baseball player (Pittsburgh Pirates).
- Tom Meyer, 96, American basketball player (Detroit Gems).
- Joseph C. Miller, 79, American historian.
- Eurico Miranda, 74, Brazilian football chairman (Vasco da Gama) and politician, Deputy (1995–2002).
- Gabriela Moser, 64, Austrian politician, MP (1994–1996, 1997–2017).
- Alan Moss, 88, English cricketer (Middlesex, MCC, national team).
- Hermann Mucke, 84, Austrian astronomer, founder and editor of Sternenbote.
- Sir John Richardson, 95, British art historian and Picasso biographer.
- Marjorie W. Sharmat, 90, American author, respiratory failure.
- Tom Skjønberg, 70, Norwegian sailor.
- Joffre Stewart, 93, American beat poet and anarchist.

=== 13 ===
- Keith Butler, 80, British racing cyclist.
- Frank Cali, 53, American mobster, head of Gambino crime family (since 2015), shot.
- Edmund Capon, 78, British-born Australian art historian and curator, director of the Art Gallery of New South Wales (1978–2011), melanoma.
- Zofia Czerwińska, 85, Polish actress (A Generation, Ashes and Diamonds, The Pianist).
- Beril Dedeoğlu, 57, Turkish politician and academic, Minister of European Union Affairs (2015), brain hemorrhage.
- Zagorka Golubović, 89, Serbian anthropologist and philosopher.
- Howard Hibbett, 98, American translator.
- Chuck Holmes, 84, Canadian ice hockey player (Detroit Red Wings).
- Harry Hughes, 92, American politician, Governor of Maryland (1979–1987), member of the Maryland House of Delegates (1955–1959) and Senate (1959–1971).
- Ghazali Jaafar, 75, Filipino militant (Moro Islamic Liberation Front) and politician, Speaker of the Bangsamoro Parliament (since 2019), kidney failure.
- Demie Mainieri, 90, American Hall of Fame baseball coach (Miami Dade College).
- Ken McKinnon, 82, Canadian politician, Commissioner of Yukon (1986–1995), member of the Yukon Territorial Council (1961–1964, 1967–1978).
- Sebastian Monroe, 33, American model.
- Joseph Hanson Kwabena Nketia, 97, Ghanaian ethnomusicologist and composer.
- David Palladini, 72, American illustrator.
- Andrea Pollack, 57, German swimmer, Olympic champion (1976, 1980), cancer.
- Charles Sanna, 101, American inventor.
- Maggie Shaddick, 92, Canadian scout leader.
- Leroy Stanton, 72, American baseball player (New York Mets, California Angels, Seattle Mariners), traffic collision.

=== 14 ===
- Paul Adams, 82, American football player and coach (Deerfield High School).
- Jeff Michael Andrews, 59, American jazz bassist.
- Kurt Armbruster, 84, Swiss footballer (Lausanne, national team).
- Birch Bayh, 91, American politician, U.S. Senator (1963–1981), member (1954–1962) and Speaker (1958–1960) of the Indiana House of Representatives, pneumonia.
- Francis J. Cain, 96, American politician.
- Rosamma Chacko, 91, Indian politician, MLA (1982–1997).
- Godfried Danneels, 85, Belgian Roman Catholic cardinal, Archbishop of Mechelen-Brussels (1979–2010).
- Terry Donahue, 93, Canadian baseball player (Peoria Redwings).
- Thomas Goddard, 81, Polish-born New Zealand jurist, Chief Employment Court Judge (1989–2005).
- Marian Sulzberger Heiskell, 100, American newspaper executive.
- Harry Helenius, 72, Finnish diplomat, ambassador to Russia (2004–2008) and Sweden (2011–2014).
- Henry S. Horn, 77, American ecologist.
- Paul Hutchins, 73, British tennis player, amyotrophic lateral sclerosis.
- Joe Knowland, 88, American actor (Escape from Alcatraz, Little Miss Marker) and newspaper publisher (Oakland Tribune).
- Masahiko Kobe, 49, Japanese chef, fall.
- Pat Laffan, 79, Irish actor (Father Ted, The Snapper).
- Maate Mahadevi, 74, Indian Hindu sect leader, author and Lingayatism activist, sepsis.
- Ralph Metzner, 82, American psychologist.
- Ilona Novák, 93, Hungarian swimmer, Olympic champion (1952).
- Onigu Otite, 80, Nigerian sociologist.
- Betty Paschen, 92, Canadian environmentalist.
- Sir Stanley Peart, 96, British medical researcher.
- Jake Phelps, 56, American skateboarder and magazine editor (Thrasher).
- Anita Silvers, 78, American philosopher.
- Lester Smith, 76, American oil executive.
- Charlie Whiting, 66, British motorsports director, FIA Formula 1 race director (since 1997), pulmonary embolism.
- Haig Young, 90, Canadian politician.

=== 15 ===
- Luca Alinari, 75, Italian painter.
- Juan Manuel Arza, 86, Spanish politician, President of the Government of Navarre (1980–1984).
- Tone Brulin, 92, Belgian stage director.
- Derek Burke, 89, British academic.
- Alec Coppen, 96, British psychiatrist.
- Peter Dunn, 82, Australian rugby union player.
- Atta Elayyan, 33, Kuwaiti-born New Zealand footballer (national futsal team) and IT entrepreneur, shot.
- Okwui Enwezor, 55, Nigerian art critic and writer, curator of the Venice Biennale (2015), multiple myeloma.
- Bengt Gustafsson, 85, Swedish military officer, Supreme Commander of the Armed Forces (1986–1994).
- Sara Payne Hayden, 99, American WWII WASP pilot.
- John P. Healey, 97, American aerospace executive.
- Leif Henriksson, 75, Swedish ice hockey player (Frölunda HC).
- Dave Hood Jr., 64, American politician, member of the Florida House of Representatives (2012–2014), brain cancer.
- Lam Jones, 60, American sprinter and football player (New York Jets, Dallas Cowboys), Olympic champion (1976), myeloma.
- Osmo Jussila, 81, Finnish historian.
- Helena Khan, 91, Bangladeshi children's writer.
- Wiesław Kilian, 66, Polish politician, member of the Sejm (2005–2007, 2010–2011), Senator (since 2011).
- Rudi Krausmann, 85, Austrian-born Australian poet and playwright.
- Derek Lewin, 88, English footballer (Bishop Auckland, Great Britain Olympic football team).
- Günther Lohre, 65, German Olympic athlete (1976).
- Luo Jye, 94, Taiwanese billionaire businessman, founder of Cheng Shin Rubber.
- W. S. Merwin, 91, American poet, Pulitzer Prize winner (1971, 2009), United States Poet Laureate.
- Bob Nader, 90, American politician.
- Dominique Noguez, 76, French writer, Prix Femina winner (1997).
- Maya Rani Paul, 86, Indian politician.
- Ron Peplow, 83, English footballer (Brentford).
- Norman A. Phillips, 95, American meteorologist.
- Y. S. Vivekananda Reddy, 68, Indian politician, member of the Lok Sabha (1999–2009), stabbed.
- Jean-Pierre Richard, 96, French literary critic.
- Ezequiel Santiago, 45, American politician, member of the Connecticut House of Representatives (since 2009), heart attack.
- Lothar Schneider, 79, German wrestler, world championship bronze medalist (1965).
- Gerhard Skiba, 71, Austrian politician, mayor of Braunau am Inn (1989–2010).
- Mike Thalassitis, 26, English-born Cypriot footballer (Boreham Wood, Ebbsfleet United) and reality show personality (Love Island), suicide by hanging.

=== 16 ===
- Michael Axworthy, 56, British academic and author, cancer.
- Timothy A. Barrow, 85, American politician, member of the Arizona House of Representatives (1966–1973), Mayor of Phoenix (1974–1976), Alzheimer's disease and cancer.
- Phil Branch, 86, American football player (Saskatchewan Roughriders).
- Ian Brown, 93, Australian football player (Geelong).
- Catherine Callaghan, 87, American linguist and anti-abortion activist, co-founder of Feminists for Life.
- Mordaunt Cohen, 102, British soldier and solicitor, AJEX chairman.
- Dick Dale, 81, American guitarist and surf music pioneer ("Let's Go Trippin'", "Misirlou"), heart failure.
- Larry DiTillio, 71, American television writer (He-Man and the Masters of the Universe, Beast Wars: Transformers, Babylon 5).
- Richard Erdman, 93, American actor (Community, Stalag 17, Tora! Tora! Tora!).
- Joe Fafard, 76, Canadian sculptor, stomach cancer.
- Barbara Hammer, 79, American filmmaker (Nitrate Kisses, Tender Fictions), ovarian cancer.
- Tom Hatten, 92, American actor (The Secret of NIMH, Spies Like Us) and media personality (KTLA).
- Gilbert Hottois, 72, Belgian philosopher.
- Yann-Fañch Kemener, 61, French singer.
- Amos Kloner, 79, Israeli archaeologist.
- Alan Krueger, 58, American economist, suicide.
- Mohamed Mahmoud Ould Louly, 76, Mauritanian military officer and politician, Chairman of the Military Committee for National Salvation (1979–1980).
- Johann Maier, 85, Austrian talmudic scholar.
- Margaret Morel, 61, Seychellois middle-distance runner.
- Howard Morgan, 87, Welsh cricketer (Glamorgan).
- Yulia Nachalova, 38, Russian singer, actress and television presenter, cerebral edema.
- Grozdana Olujić, 84, Serbian writer.
- Stephen Rolfe Powell, 67, American glass artist.
- Dorothy Stein, 87, American computer programmer and psychologist.
- David White, 79, American singer-songwriter (Danny & the Juniors, The Spokesmen).
- Sir William Whitfield, 98, British architect.

=== 17 ===
- Hanne Aga, 71, Norwegian poet.
- Ken Bald, 98, American illustrator and comic book artist (Dr. Kildare).
- Barbara Benary, 72, American composer and ethnomusicologist, Parkinson's disease.
- Ulf Bengtsson, 59, Swedish table tennis player.
- Bill Burlison, 88, American politician, member of the U.S. House of Representatives for Missouri's 10th district (1969–1981).
- Mick Carley, 78, Irish Gaelic footballer (Westmeath).
- Shahed Chowdhury, 53, Bangladeshi film director.
- René Fontès, 77, French rugby union executive and politician, president of ASM Clermont Auvergne (2004–2013), mayor of Eygalières (since 2008), heart attack.
- Víctor Genes, 57, Paraguayan football player (Cerro Porteño) and manager (Trinidense, national team), heart attack.
- James B. Goetz, 82, American radio broadcaster and politician, lieutenant governor of Minnesota (1967–1971).
- Norman Hollyn, 66, American film and television editor (Heathers, Wild Palms, The Equalizer), coronary embolism and cardiac arrest.
- Jorge Insunza Becker, 82, Chilean engineer and politician, Deputy (1969–1973).
- Olavi Mannonen, 89, Finnish modern pentathlete, Olympic silver medalist (1956) and bronze medalist (1952, 1956).
- João Carlos Marinho, 83, Brazilian writer (O Gênio do Crime)
- Paul-André Massé, 71, Canadian politician.
- Wolfgang Meyer, 64, German clarinetist, cancer.
- Norman Mittelmann, 86, Canadian operatic baritone, chronic obstructive pulmonary disease.
- Mick Murphy, 77, English rugby player (St Helens, Leigh).
- José Musalem Saffie, 94, Chilean politician, Senator (1965–1973) and Deputy (1953–1965).
- Manohar Parrikar, 63, Indian politician, MP (2014–2017), Minister of Defence (2014–2017) and Chief Minister of Goa (2000–2005, 2012–2014, since 2017), pancreatic cancer.
- Chinmoy Roy, 79, Indian actor (Goopy Gyne Bagha Byne, Ekhoni, Subarna Golak), heart attack.
- Richie Ryan, 90, Irish politician, Teachta Dála (1959–1982), MEP (1973–1977, 1979–1982) and Minister for Finance (1973–1977).
- Bernie Tormé, 66, Irish guitarist, singer and songwriter (Gillan, Guy McCoy Tormé, Desperado), pneumonia.
- Yuya Uchida, 79, Japanese singer (Flower Travellin' Band) and actor (Merry Christmas, Mr. Lawrence, Black Rain), pneumonia.
- Andre Williams, 82, American R&B singer and songwriter ("Shake a Tail Feather"), colon cancer.
- Tunku Puan Zanariah, 78, Malaysian royal, Raja Permaisuri Agong (1984–1989).

=== 18 ===
- Egon Balas, 96, Romanian mathematician.
- György Baló, 71, Hungarian broadcaster.
- Vlastimil Brlica, 90, Czech Olympic athlete.
- John Carl Buechler, 66, American visual effects artist and film director (Troll, Friday the 13th Part VII: The New Blood, Hatchet), prostate cancer.
- François Camoin, 79, French-American academic and writer.
- Marcel-Pierre Cléach, 86, French politician, Senator (1995–2014), mayor of Lombron (1995–2011).
- Jerrie Cobb, 88, American aviator.
- Louise Erickson, 91, American radio and film actress.
- Jackie Fahey, 91, Irish politician, Teachta Dála (1965–1992).
- Brian Gidney, 80, English cricketer.
- William Haye, 70, Jamaican cricketer, shot.
- Tova Ilan, 89, Israeli politician, member of the Knesset (2006).
- Roger Kirby, 79, American professional wrestler (CSW, WWA, NWA Mid-America), pneumonia.
- Dessie Larkin, 49, Irish politician.
- Pavel Machotka, 82, Czech-born American psychologist and painter, complications from a stroke.
- Karl-Heinz Mrosko, 72, German footballer (Bayern Munich, Hannover 96, Arminia Hannover), pancreatitis and pneumonia.
- Junkichi Orimoto, 92, Japanese actor (Three Outlaw Samurai, The Return of Godzilla, The Human Condition).
- Lorenzo Orsetti, 33, Italian volunteer soldier, shot.
- Pioneerof the Nile, 13, American racing thoroughbred, heart attack.
- Giovanni Sgro, 88, Italian-born Australian politician, MLC (1979–1992).
- Bomma Venkateshwar, 78, Indian politician, MLA (1999–2004).

=== 19 ===
- Derek Anthony, 71, British military officer, Flag Officer Scotland, Northern England and Northern Ireland (2000–2003).
- Graham Arnold, 86, English artist.
- Arthur Bartman, 46, South African footballer (Kaizer Chiefs, Maritzburg United).
- Mona Lee Brock, 87, American educator and crisis support counsellor, heart failure.
- Boris Dubrovin, 68, Russian mathematician, amyotrophic lateral sclerosis.
- Thanasis Giannakopoulos, 88, Greek pharmaceutical and sports executive (Vianex S.A., Panathinaikos A.O.).
- Maurílio de Gouveia, 86, Portuguese Roman Catholic prelate, Bishop of Évora (1981–2008).
- Tony Greenfield, 87, British statistician.
- Clinton Greyn, 85, Welsh actor (Compact, Goodbye, Mr. Chips, Doctor Who).
- Chuck Harmon, 94, American baseball player (Cincinnati Redlegs, St. Louis Cardinals).
- Rose Hilton, 87, British painter.
- Marlen Khutsiev, 93, Georgian-born Russian film director (I Am Twenty, July Rain, Infinitas), People's Artist of the USSR (1986).
- George W. Lindberg, 86, American judge, Senior Judge of the United States District Court for the Northern District of Illinois (2001–2012).
- Noel McFarlane, 84, Irish footballer (Manchester United).
- Brenda Muntemba, 48, Zambian diplomat, High Commissioner to Kenya, complications from a traffic collision.
- Genevieve Oswald, 97, American dance scholar and curator (New York Public Library).
- Bill Phelps, 84, American politician, Lieutenant Governor of Missouri (1972–1980).
- Astri Riddervold, 93, Norwegian chemist and ethnologist.
- S. B. Sinha, 74, Indian judge.
- Ian Thorogood, 82, Australian football player (Melbourne) and coach (Carlton).
- Kenneth To, 26, Hong Kong-born Australian swimmer, FINA Swimming World Cup overall winner (2012), Youth Olympics champion (2010), cardiac arrest.

=== 20 ===
- Joseph Victor Adamec, 83, American Roman Catholic prelate, Bishop of Altoona–Johnstown (1987–2011).
- Anatoly Adoskin, 91, Russian actor (Seven Old Men and a Girl, The Brothers Karamazov, Moscow-Cassiopeia), People's Artist of the Russian Federation (1996).
- Dennis Anderson, 69, Canadian politician, MLA for Calgary-Currie (1979–1993).
- Betty G. Bailey, 79, American artist.
- Eunetta T. Boone, 63, American television writer and producer (One on One, Raven's Home, The Hughleys), heart attack.
- Joaquín Calomarde, 62, Spanish teacher and politician, Deputy (2000–2008).
- Tom Doncourt, 63, American musician, idiopathic pulmonary fibrosis.
- Henry Graham, 88, British poet.
- Linda Gregg, 76, American poet.
- Nobuhiko Higashikuni, 74, Japanese Imperial prince.
- Noel Hush, 94, Australian chemist.
- Randy Jackson, 93, American baseball player (Chicago Cubs, Brooklyn/Los Angeles Dodgers, Cleveland Indians).
- Donald Kalpokas, 75, ni-Vanuatu politician, Prime Minister (1991, 1998–1999).
- Panos Koutrouboussis, 82, Greek writer and artist.
- Georg Kreutzberg, 86, German neurobiologist.
- Antonio Menegazzo, 87, Italian Roman Catholic prelate, Apostolic Administrator of El Obeid (1996–2010).
- Terje Nilsen, 67, Norwegian singer-songwriter.
- Hans Günter Nöcker, 92, German bass-baritone singer.
- Lance Oswald, 82, Australian footballer (St Kilda).
- Ralph Solecki, 101, American archaeologist.
- John Steeples, 59, English footballer (Grimsby Town, Scarborough).
- A. Subramaniam, 93, Indian politician, MLA (1971–1977).
- Gerald Eustis Thomas, 89, American rear admiral.
- Keyvan Vahdani, 27, Iranian footballer (Paykan), landslide.
- Mary Warnock, Baroness Warnock, 94, British philosopher.
- Ken Wiesner, 94, American Olympic high jumper.
- Leonard Wolf, 96, Romanian-born American poet.
- John Yaccino, 78, American football player (Buffalo Bills).

=== 21 ===
- John Bersia, 62, American writer.
- Anna Maria Canopi, 87, Italian Benedictine abbess and spiritual writer.
- Mike Cofer, 58, American football player (Detroit Lions), amyloidosis.
- Marcel Detienne, 83, Belgian historian.
- Anthony Dickerson, 61, American football player (Dallas Cowboys), injuries sustained in a fall.
- Doris Duke, 77, American soul and gospel singer.
- Gordon Hill, 90, English football referee.
- Adzil Holder, 87, Barbadian cricketer.
- R. Kanagaraj, 66, Indian politician, cardiac arrest.
- Walter Lambertus, 63, Romanian Olympic rower.
- Roger Moore, 79, American computer scientist and philanthropist.
- Gonzalo Portocarrero, 69, Peruvian sociologist, lung cancer.
- Francis Quinn, 97, American Roman Catholic prelate, Bishop of Sacramento (1980–1993).
- K. G. Rajasekharan, 72, Indian Malayalam film director.
- Haku Shah, 85, Indian artist, cardiac arrest.
- Balwant Singh, 82, Indian politician, secretary of Punjab Communist Party of India (Marxist) (1998–2008), MLA (1980–1985).
- Paul Kouassivi Vieira, 69, Beninese Roman Catholic prelate, Bishop of Djougou (since 1995).
- Franco Wanyama, 51, Ugandan Olympic boxer.
- Douglas Y. Yongue, 82, American politician.
- Pyotr Zaychenko, 75, Russian film and theater actor (Planet Parade, Taxi Blues, Leningrad 46).

=== 22 ===
- Jack Absalom, 91, Australian painter and adventurer.
- Frans Andriessen, 89, Dutch politician, Minister of Finance (1977–1980), European Commissioner (1981–1993).
- Dino De Antoni, 82, Italian Roman Catholic prelate, Archbishop of Gorizia (1999–2012).
- Prudent Carpentier, 97, Canadian politician, member of the National Assembly of Quebec (1970–1976).
- John Duignan, 73, Scottish comedy writer, motor neurone disease.
- Joe Hall, 71, Canadian singer-songwriter, liver cancer.
- June Harding, 81, American actress (The Trouble with Angels, The Richard Boone Show, Matt Lincoln).
- Victor Hochhauser, 95, Slovak-born British music promoter.
- César Lévano, 92, Peruvian journalist and teacher.
- Hugh T. Lightsey, 93, American politician, member of the South Carolina House of Representatives (1965–1971).
- Jared Lobdell, 81, American author and Tolkien scholar.
- Keyonta Marshall, 37, American football player (Philadelphia Eagles, Hamburg Sea Devils), cancer.
- Tom Maxwell, 94, British military officer.
- Art Mazmanian, 91, American baseball player and manager (Newark Orioles, Oneonta Yankees).
- Bobby McCool, 76, Scottish footballer (Cheltenham Town, Gloucester City).
- Denzil Meuli, 92, New Zealand writer, newspaper editor (Zealandia), and Roman Catholic priest.
- Charles A. Miller, 81, American political scientist, oropharyngeal and esophageal dysphagia.
- Jim Moody, 83, American politician, member of the U.S. House of Representatives for Wisconsin's 5th (1983–1993), Wisconsin State Senate (1979–1982) and Wisconsin State Assembly.
- Arlen Ness, 79, American motorcycle designer and entrepreneur.
- Behrouz Rahbar, 73, Iranian Olympic racing cyclist (1972).
- C. S. Shivalli, 58, Indian politician, heart attack.
- Bernard Vaillant, 70, Belgian Olympic volleyball player.
- Scott Walker, 76, American-born British singer-songwriter (The Walker Brothers), composer and record producer.
- Zinka Zorko, 84, Slovenian linguist, dialectologist and academic, member of Slovenian Academy of Sciences and Arts (since 2003).

=== 23 ===
- Kate Baxter, 88, Australian Olympic fencer.
- Philomena Canning, 59, Irish midwife and women's health advocate, ovarian cancer.
- Tudor Caranfil, 87, Romanian film critic.
- Lina Cheryazova, 50, Uzbek freestyle skier, Olympic champion (1994).
- Larry Cohen, 82, American film director (It's Alive, The Stuff) and screenwriter (Phone Booth).
- Clem Daniels, 81, American football player (Oakland Raiders).
- Domingos de Oliveira, 82, Brazilian director, playwright, screenwriter and actor.
- Vinjamuri Anasuya Devi, 98, Indian singer and composer.
- Jacques Dessemme, 93, French Olympic basketball player (1952).
- Denise DuBarry, 63, American actress (Black Sheep Squadron, Being There, Monster in the Closet), producer and marketer, fungal infection.
- Rafi Eitan, 92, Israeli intelligence officer and politician, member of the Knesset (2006–2009) and Minister for Senior Citizens (2006–2009).
- Hertha E. Flack, 102, American philanthropist and painter.
- James Carroll Fox, 90, American senior judge, U.S. District Judge for Eastern North Carolina (1982–2017).
- Hal King, 75, American baseball player (Houston Astros, Atlanta Braves, Cincinnati Reds).
- Ferd Lahure, 89, Luxembourgish footballer (national team).
- Matti Launonen, 74, Finnish table tennis player, Paralympic champion (1992, 1996), complications from a fall.
- Howard V. Lee, 85, American soldier, Medal of Honor recipient.
- Lee Shi-chi, 81, Taiwanese artist.
- Li Fulin, 59, Chinese police official and politician, Vice Governor of Hainan Province.
- Yoshitaka Muroya, 88, Japanese Olympic runner.
- Shahnaz Rahmatullah, 67, Bangladeshi singer, heart attack.
- René Remangeon, 87, French racing cyclist.
- Finn Willy Sørensen, 77, Danish footballer (Boldklubben Frem, Washington Whips).
- George C. Windrow, 87, American politician.

=== 24 ===
- Reynaldo Aguinaldo, 70, Filipino politician, Mayor of Kawit (2007–2016), cardiac arrest.
- Andrew Browder, 88, American mathematician.
- Pancracio Celdrán, 77, Spanish professor and journalist.
- Anna Cohn, 68, American museum director and Judaic scholar.
- Ayanda Denge, South African transgender and anti-sex trafficking activist, stabbed.
- Erik Fjeldstad, 75, Norwegian ice hockey player (national team).
- Alan H. Friedman, 91, American writer.
- Nancy Gates, 93, American actress (Masterson of Kansas, World Without End, Magnificent Roughnecks).
- Joe Harvard, 60, American musician, liver cancer.
- Ensio Hyytiä, 81, Finnish Olympic ski jumper (1960, 1964), world championship silver medalist (1958).
- Noah Keen, 98, American actor (Arrest and Trial, Battle for the Planet of the Apes, Tom Sawyer).
- Vicky Kippin, 76, Australian politician, Queensland MLA (1974–1980).
- Harry Lee, 87, American football player (Hamilton Tiger-Cats).
- Julia Lockwood, 77, British actress (My Teenage Daughter, Please Turn Over, No Kidding), pneumonia.
- Finn Lowery, 28, New Zealand water polo player (national team), suicide.
- Michael Lynne, 77, American studio executive (New Line Cinema) and film producer (The Lord of the Rings, A Nightmare on Elm Street).
- Brian MacArthur, 79, British newspaper editor and writer, leukaemia.
- Fred Malek, 82, American executive (Marriott Corporation, Coldwell Banker, Northwest Airlines), political campaigner and philanthropist.
- Mich Matsudaira, 81, American businessman and civil rights activist.
- Desmond Dudwa Phiri, 88, Malawian historian and economist.
- Joseph Pilato, 70, American actor (Day of the Dead, Pulp Fiction, Digimon: The Movie).
- Ronald K. Siegel, 76, American psychopharmacologist.
- Robert W. Sweet, 96, American senior judge, U.S. District Judge for Southern New York (since 1978).
- Laura Wooten, 98, American poll worker.

=== 25 ===
- Lisle Atkinson, 78, American jazz double bassist.
- Edna Barker, 82, English cricketer (national team).
- Ordell Braase, 87, American football player (Baltimore Colts), complications from Alzheimer's disease.
- Virgilio Caballero Pedraza, 77, Mexican journalist and politician, MP (2015–2018).
- Douglas Court, 86, Canadian figure skater.
- Paul Dawkins, 61, American-Turkish basketball player (Utah Jazz, Galatasaray).
- Eduardo De Santis, 89, Italian actor and philanthropist.
- Len Fontaine, 71, Canadian ice hockey player (Detroit Red Wings).
- Stylianos Harkianakis, 83, Australian Greek Orthodox prelate, Archbishop of Australia (since 1975).
- Barrie Hole, 76, Welsh footballer (Cardiff City, Aston Villa, national team).
- Adolph Lawrence, 50, Liberian politician, member of the House of Representatives (since 2012), traffic collision.
- Miklós Martin, 87, Hungarian Olympic water polo player.
- Antonio Napoletano, 81, Italian Roman Catholic prelate, Bishop of Sessa Aurunca (1994–2013).
- Julian Nott, 74, British balloonist and scientist.
- Susan Nutter, 74–75, American librarian.
- Gabriel Okara, 97, Nigerian poet and novelist.
- Jean Price, 75, American politician, member of the Montana House of Representatives (2011–2019), pancreatic cancer.
- Cal Ramsey, 81, American basketball player (St. Louis Hawks, New York Knicks, Syracuse Nationals), heart attack.
- Sofía Rocha, 51, Peruvian actress, fall.
- Dorothy Rowe, 88, Australian psychologist and writer.
- Fumio Saito, 65, Japanese Olympic basketball player.
- Jerry Schypinski, 87, American baseball player (Kansas City Athletics).
- Sydel Silverman, 86, American anthropologist.
- Bill Thompson III, 57, American ornithologist and publisher (Bird Watcher's Digest), pancreatic cancer.
- Lyle Tuttle, 87, American tattoo artist.
- Jack Weisenburger, 92, American football player (Michigan Wolverines) and basketball player.

=== 26 ===
- Ralph Allen, 92, Canadian painter.
- Michel Bacos, 95, French pilot (Air France Flight 139).
- Ted Burgin, 91, English football player (Sheffield United, Leeds United, Rochdale) and manager.
- Christopher N. Chandler, 80, American journalist (Chicago Sun-Times) and political speechwriter, prostate cancer.
- François Dubanchet, 95, French politician.
- Catherine R. Gira, 86, American educator and university administrator.
- Kenichi Hagiwara, 68, Japanese actor and singer, gastrointestinal stromal tumor.
- Rafael Henzel, 45, Brazilian sports broadcaster, survivor of LaMia Flight 2933 crash, heart attack.
- Immanuel Kauluma Elifas, 86, Namibian royal, Chief of Ondonga (since 1975).
- Andrew Marshall, 97, American military and diplomatic advisor, director of Office of Net Assessment (1973–2015).
- Master Fatman, 53, Danish comedian, film director (Gayniggers from Outer Space) and singer.
- Bronco McLoughlin, 80, Irish stuntman (Indiana Jones and the Temple of Doom, Star Wars, Superman).
- Ali Mema, 76, Albanian footballer (Tirana, national team) and manager.
- Nodar Mgaloblishvili, 87, Georgian actor (Centaurs, Formula of Love, Katala).
- James F. Nagle, 91, American politician, member of the New York State Assembly (1977–1992).
- Jennifer Pagliaro, 35, American singer, complications from breast cancer.
- Arthur Porter, 95, Sierra Leonean historian.
- W. H. Pugmire, 67, American writer.
- Ranking Roger, 56, British singer (The Beat, General Public), cancer.
- Redoute's Choice, 22, Australian Thoroughbred racehorse and champion sire, euthanised.
- Isidro Sala Ribera, 86, Spanish-born Peruvian Roman Catholic prelate, Bishop of Abancay (1992–2009).
- N. Selvaraj, 75, Indian politician, member of Lok Sabha (1980–1984).
- Tejshree Thapa, 52, Nepalese human rights lawyer, multiple organ failure.
- Heinz Winbeck, 73, German composer.
- Ralph Stoner Wolfe, 97, American microbiologist.

=== 27 ===
- Friedrich Achleitner, 88, Austrian poet and architecture critic.
- Ashitha, 62, Indian writer, cancer.
- Joe Bellino, 81, American football player (Naval Academy, Boston Patriots), Heisman Trophy winner (1960).
- Dragan Bošnjak, 62, Serbian footballer (Spartak Subotica, Vojvodina, Dinamo Zagreb).
- Pierre Bourguignon, 77, French politician, Deputy (1981–1993, 1997–2012), mayor of Sotteville-lès-Rouen (1989–2014), heart attack.
- John Browne, 82, Irish politician, Senator (1983–1987) and TD (1989–2002).
- Valery Bykovsky, 84, Russian cosmonaut (Vostok 5, Soyuz 22, Soyuz 31).
- Roy Eugene Davis, 88, American spiritual teacher, heart failure.
- Abdul Latif Dayfallah, 89, Yemeni military officer and politician, Prime Minister (1963, 1975).
- Edit Doron, 68, Israeli linguist.
- Jan Dydak, 50, Polish boxer, Olympic bronze medalist (1988), cancer.
- Valentino Giambelli, 91, Italian football player (Olginatese, Monza, Gallaratese) and executive, Chairman of Monza (1980–2000).
- Yoji Harada, 46, Japanese tattoo artist and reality show personality (Miami Ink).
- Jan Kobylański, 95, Polish-Paraguayan union leader and stamp printer.
- Akihito Kondo, 80, Japanese baseball player.
- Carroll LeTellier, 90, American major general.
- Prasanta Kumar Majumdar, 78, Indian politician.
- John Permal, 72, Pakistani sprinter, pancreatic cancer.
- Dimitri Polizos, 68, American politician, member of the Alabama House of Representatives (since 2013), heart attack.
- Marvin E. Proffer, 88, American politician, member of the Missouri House of Representatives (1962–1986).
- P. J. G. Ransom, 83, Scottish author.
- Lawrence Rhodes, 79, American dancer and ballet director.
- Bruce Yardley, 71, Australian Test cricketer, cancer.

=== 28 ===
- Vladimir Basalayev, 73, Russian football player (Lokomotiv Moscow, Dynamo Moscow, USSR national team) and manager.
- Jonathan Baumbach, 85, American author, academic, and film critic.
- Bill Culbert, 84, New Zealand artist.
- Alphonse D'Arco, 86, American mobster, acting boss of the Lucchese crime family (1990–1991), kidney disease. (death announced on this date)
- Ralph Fertig, 89, American social justice activist, lawyer and author.
- François-Marc Gagnon, 83, Canadian art historian.
- Domenico Giannace, 94, Italian trade unionist and politician, member of the Regional Council of Basilicata (1980–1985).
- John Harris, 83, English cricketer (Somerset).
- Klaus Koch, 92, German biblical scholar.
- Pierre Lacroix, 84, French rugby union player.
- Maury Laws, 95, American television and film composer (Rudolph the Red-Nosed Reindeer, Frosty the Snowman, The Little Drummer Boy).
- Ian McDonald, 82, Scottish civil servant.
- Koji Nakanishi, 93, Japanese chemist.
- Kevin Randall, 73, English football player and manager (Chesterfield, York City).
- Damir Salimov, 81, Uzbek film director.
- David Schwartzman, 94, Canadian-born American economist.
- Eva Mae Fleming Scott, 92, American politician, member of the Virginia House of Delegates (1972–1979) and Senate (1980–1984).
- Fuyumi Shiraishi, 82, Japanese voice actress (Mobile Suit Gundam, Patalliro!, The Monster Kid), heart failure.
- Garry Sidebottom, 64, Australian VFL footballer (St Kilda, Geelong, Fitzroy), cancer.
- Jon Skolmen, 78, Norwegian actor (Sällskapsresan, Hodet over vannet).
- Bob Stewart, 79, British radio presenter (Radio Luxembourg).
- Henry Stern, 83, American politician and government official, member of NYCC (1974–1983), Commissioner of NYC Parks (1983–1990, 1994–2000), complications of Parkinson's disease.
- Wong Tien Fatt, 64, Malaysian politician, MP (since 2013), heart attack.
- Steve Wormith, 72, Canadian football player (Montreal Alouettes) and psychologist, cancer.

=== 29 ===
- Mark Alessi, 65, American comic book publisher, founder of CrossGen.
- Satish Kumar Chauhan, 58, Indian politician, MLA (1985–1990), heart attack.
- Allan Cole, 75, American author and television writer.
- Johnny Creedon, 86, Irish Gaelic footballer.
- Srima Dissanayake, 76, Sri Lankan lawyer and politician.
- Jane Durham, 89, British architect.
- Anders Ehnmark, 87, Swedish author and journalist (Expressen, Norrskensflamman, Folket i Bild/Kulturfront).
- Joe Enook, 61, Canadian politician, member (since 2011) and Speaker of the Legislative Assembly of Nunavut (since 2017).
- Dobrica Erić, 82, Serbian writer and poet.
- Josep Esteve i Soler, 89, Spanish pharmaceutical executive.
- Paul D.K. Fraser, 78, Canadian jurist, president of the Canadian Bar Association (1981–1982) and the Commonwealth Lawyers Association (1993–1996).
- Kenneth A. Gibson, 86, American politician, mayor of Newark, New Jersey (1970–1986).
- Angeline Gunathilake, 79, Sri Lankan singer.
- Samantha Heath, 58, British politician, member of the London Assembly (2000–2004).
- Joshua Hecht, 91, American operatic bass.
- Tao Ho, 82, Hong Kong architect (Hong Kong Arts Centre) and designer of the flag of Hong Kong, pneumonia.
- Jim Holt, 74, American baseball player (Minnesota Twins, Oakland Athletics).
- Jon Østeng Hov, 83, Norwegian photographer and writer.
- Harry Kesten, 87, German-born American mathematician.
- Margaret Lewis, 79, American singer-songwriter ("The Girl Most Likely", "Reconsider Me"), pneumonia.
- Zdeněk Marek, 93, Czech-born American ice hockey player.
- Shane Rimmer, 89, Canadian-born British actor (Thunderbirds, Dr. Strangelove, The Spy Who Loved Me).
- Agnès Varda, 90, French film director (Cléo from 5 to 7, Le Bonheur, Vagabond), cancer.
- Ed Westcott, 97, American photographer (Manhattan Project).

=== 30 ===
- Billy Adams, 79, American rockabilly musician.
- Mary Bayliss, 79, English magistrate, High Sheriff (2005–2006) and Lord Lieutenant of Berkshire (2008–2015).
- Greg Booker, 58, American baseball player (San Diego Padres, Minnesota Twins, San Francisco Giants), melanoma.
- John Brown, 83, British rugby union player (Harlequins, British Lions) and Olympic bobsledder (1968).
- Jay Chevalier, 83, American singer.
- Paloma Cela, 76, Spanish actress (Forty Degrees in the Shade, Cry Chicago, The Legion Like Women), stroke.
- Ron Elvidge, 96, New Zealand rugby union player (Otago, national team).
- Patrick X. Gallagher, 84, American mathematician.
- Maurice Hardouin, 71, French footballer.
- Geoff Harvey, 83, Australian musician and music director (The Mike Walsh Show, Midday).
- Alex Jones, 30, British racing driver and cyclist, cardiac arrest.
- Truman Lowe, 75, American artist.
- Simaro Lutumba, 81, Congolese musician (TPOK Jazz).
- Tania Mallet, 77, English model and actress (Goldfinger).
- Paul Martin, 54, Australian rules footballer (South Adelaide).
- John Wilson Moore, 98, American biophysicist.
- David Paintin, 88, British obstetrician and gynaecologist.
- Lasse Petterson, 83, Swedish actor.
- Havel Rowe, 90, Australian VFL footballer (Richmond).
- Jim Russell, 98, English racing driver.
- Michele Russo, 74, Italian Roman Catholic prelate, Bishop of Doba (1989–2014).
- Nevil Schoenmakers, 63, Australian-born Dutch cannabis activist, cancer.
- Ruben Tovmasyan, 82, Armenian politician, First Secretary of the Armenian Communist Party (2005–2014).
- Virginia Uribe, 85, American educator and LGBT advocate.
- Ben West Jr., 78, American politician, member of the Tennessee House of Representatives (1985–2011).

=== 31 ===
- Peter Brenner, 81, Swiss civil engineer and geologist.
- Peter Coleman, 90, Australian politician and writer, Leader of the New South Wales Opposition (1977–1978), member of the House of Representatives (1981–1987).
- Britt Damberg, 82, Swedish singer.
- Cesare Dujany, 99, Italian politician, MP (1979–1996), President of Aosta Valley (1970–1974).
- Natalia Fileva, 55, Russian business executive (S7 Airlines), plane crash.
- Charles Foster, 65, American Olympic hurdler (1976).
- Ralph S. Greco, 76, American surgeon, prostate cancer.
- José Antonio Gurriarán, 80, Spanish journalist.
- Corrado Hérin, 52, Italian luger and mountain bike racer, plane crash.
- Liz Howe, 59, British ecologist, cancer.
- Nipsey Hussle, 33, American rapper ("Last Time That I Checc'd", "Racks in the Middle"), shot.
- Jake Jaeckel, 76, American baseball player (Chicago Cubs).
- Frank Jonik, 61, Canadian snooker player.
- Joseph Levi, 95, American politician, member of the Pennsylvania House of Representatives (1975–1984).
- John J. Maurer, 96, American politician, member of the Wisconsin State Senate (1975–1985).
- Eva Moser, 36, Austrian chess player, leukaemia.
- Kit Napier, 75, Scottish footballer (Brighton & Hove Albion, Blackburn Rovers).
- Peggy O'Keefe, 90, Australian-Scottish pianist.
- Yves Préfontaine, 82, Canadian writer.
- Thomas James Reddy, 73, American artist and poet.
- Hedi Turki, 96, Tunisian painter.
