= Jonathan Piel =

American science journalist and editor (born 1938)

Jonathan Piel (born November 23, 1938) is an American science journalist and editor.

== Work ==
=== At the Scientific American ===
He became the editor of Scientific American in June 1984 and left the magazine in August 1994. Following the tradition established by Gerard Piel and Dennis Flanagan he managed a staff of editors, artists, and writers who express the development of science in such fields as physics, astrophysics, cosmology, evolution, biology, archeology, anthropology, sociology and psychology. He maintained the magazine's focus on medicine and health care, the impact of information technology on society and the economy, strategic weaponry, and the relationship between the environment and the global economy. *Continuing the series of annual single-topic issues, the magazine — under Jonathan Piel's editorship — covered such topics as the relationship between mind and brain, human economic growth and the environment, and the AIDS epidemic.

=== At Stanford University ===
Before assuming the editorship of Scientific American, Jonathan Piel worked with Edward Rubenstein, then the Associate Dean of Post-Graduate Medical Education and Professor of Clinical Medicine at Stanford University School of Medicine, to create Scientific American Medicine, a text designed to keep physician-subscribers abreast of significant changes in internal medicine.

=== Career Origins ===
Piel began covering science and technology as a writer in the Public Relations Department of the American Institute of Physics. He joined the editorial staff of Newsweek in 1967. In 1969, he became a member of the editorial board of Scientific American.

== Family ==
He is the son of Gerard Piel and Mary Tapp Bird (both deceased) and the stepson of Eleanor Jackson Piel. Born in New York City, he attended the City & Country School, The Putney School in Putney, Vermont, and graduated from Harvard College in 1961. In 2002, he earned a Master of Professional Studies degree from the N.Y.U. Tisch School of the Arts, in its Interactive Telecommunications Program. He has two daughters by Ellen Elizabeth Harfield Piel (deceased, 1996): Sarah Piel (b. 1970) and Katie Piel (b. 1977).

== Sources ==
The records of the City & Country School, The Putney School in Putney, Vermont, Harvard College, N.Y.U. Tisch School of the Arts. N.Y. Times (passim) Mastheads of Scientific American from 1969 through 1994.

His children are special educator and early childhood development specialist, Sarah Piel, MS.Ed (b 1970) and eating disorder therapist Katie Piel, LMFT (b. 1977).
