= Lightsey =

Lightsey is a surname. Notable people with the surname include:

- Harry Lightsey (1901–1986), American college football player and coach, politician, and judge
- Hugh T. Lightsey (1925−2019), American politician
- Kirk Lightsey (born 1937), American jazz pianist
