= Parasol Press, Ltd. =

Publishing company in New York City

Parasol Press, Ltd. logo

Parasol Press, Ltd. was a publishing company founded in New York City in 1970 by Robert Feldman (May 13, 1937 – May 22, 2022).

Parasol Press is known for its early editions of prints by Minimalist and Conceptual artists including Mel Bochner, Chuck Close, Richard Estes, Sol LeWitt, Robert Mangold, Brice Marden, Agnes Martin, Dorothea Rockburne, Robert Ryman, and Wayne Thiebaud.

In the late 1970s Parasol Press published the Rubber Stamp Portfolio. It is a portfolio of 13 rubber stamp prints, in an edition of 1,000. The artists contributing to the portfolio were Carl André, Richard Artschwager, Daniel Buren, Chuck Close, Barry Le Va, Sol LeWitt, Robert Mangold, Sylvia Plimack Mangold, Agnes Martin, Don Nice, Myron Stedman Stout, Tom Wesselmann, and Joe Zucker. A complete portfolio is in the Princeton University Art Museum.

Works from the studio are in the collection of the Allen Memorial Art Museum, the British Museum, the Fine Arts Museums of San Francisco, the Harvard Art Museums, the Los Angeles County Museum of Art, the Minneapolis Institute of Art, the Museum of Modern Art, the Portland Art Museum, the Smithsonian American Art Museum, and Yale University Art Gallery.

== Robert Feldman ==
Feldman was born on May 13, 1937. He had a career as an enforcement attorney for the Securities and Exchange Commission. In 1970 he left his law career to found the Parasol Press. In 2014 Feldman, along with the mathematician Dan Rockmore, published the Concinnitas portfolio consisting of ten equations selected and hand-drawn by ten mathematicians and physicists. The series of aquatints explores the idea of beauty in mathematics The series was exhibited at variety of museums including the Metropolitan Museum of Art. Feldman eventually relocated to Portland, Oregon, relocating the Parasol Press as well. Feldman died on May 22, 2022, in Portland.
