= Oswald Thomas =

Austrian astronomer (1882–1963)

Oswald Thomas (born July 27, 1882 in Kronstadt [now Braşov, in Transylvania, Romania]; died Feb. 13, 1963 in Vienna, Austria), was an astronomer and a protagonist of the popularization of astronomy in Germany and Austria.

== Career ==
Thomas's father, Karl, a girls' school director, imbued his son with the fascination of astronomical phenomenology from early on. In 1907, Oswald organised a formal registration system for fireball observations in his home town of Kronstadt and named the institution Astronomisches Büro (Astronomical Bureau). Its tasks soon extended to a broader range of adult education in astronomy.

From 1910 to 1913, Thomas taught mathematics and physics at the German Gymnasium (high school) in Kronstadt. He relocated to Vienna, took his Astronomical Bureau organization with him and was a teacher at various private and public schools from 1913 to 191, when he became head of the Urania observatory in Vienna (1915-1922, and again 1933–1934). When the first Zeiss projector planetarium to be installed outside Germany was established in Vienna in 1927, Thomas became its chief astronomer. His standard presentation Der Himmel über Wien (The Sky Above Vienna) achieved huge popularity. It was performed over a thousand times and according to Thomas provided the inspiration for the first Zeiss planetarium to be set up in the United States (in Chicago).

In 1934, Thomas pointed out that the missing Messier object M48 actually was NGC 2548, an identification that became generally accepted only after T.F. Morris of the Royal Astronomical Society of Canada independently repeated it in 1959. He introduced the Summer Triangle (which he named "Great Triangle") as an asterism into the literature, and created an atlas of celestial constellations that is popular even today. Until his retirement Thomas gave over 7,000 public lectures, including 278 radio lectures.

After World War II, Thomas incessantly pushed for a new Vienna public planetarium and in 1962, at the age of 80, participated in the laying of its foundation. He was succeeded in most of his activities by Hermann Mucke, who had been taught and mentored by him. Thomas was cremated at Feuerhalle Simmering, where also his ashes are buried.

== Honours ==
In 1941, the University of Vienna made Thomas an honorary professor for astronomy. In 1974, the place in the Prater at which Vienna's current planetarium had been erected was named in his honour. Since 2004, the asteroid 29427 Oswaldthomas bears his name.
