= Hermann Mucke (astronomer) =

Austrian astronomer (1935–2019)

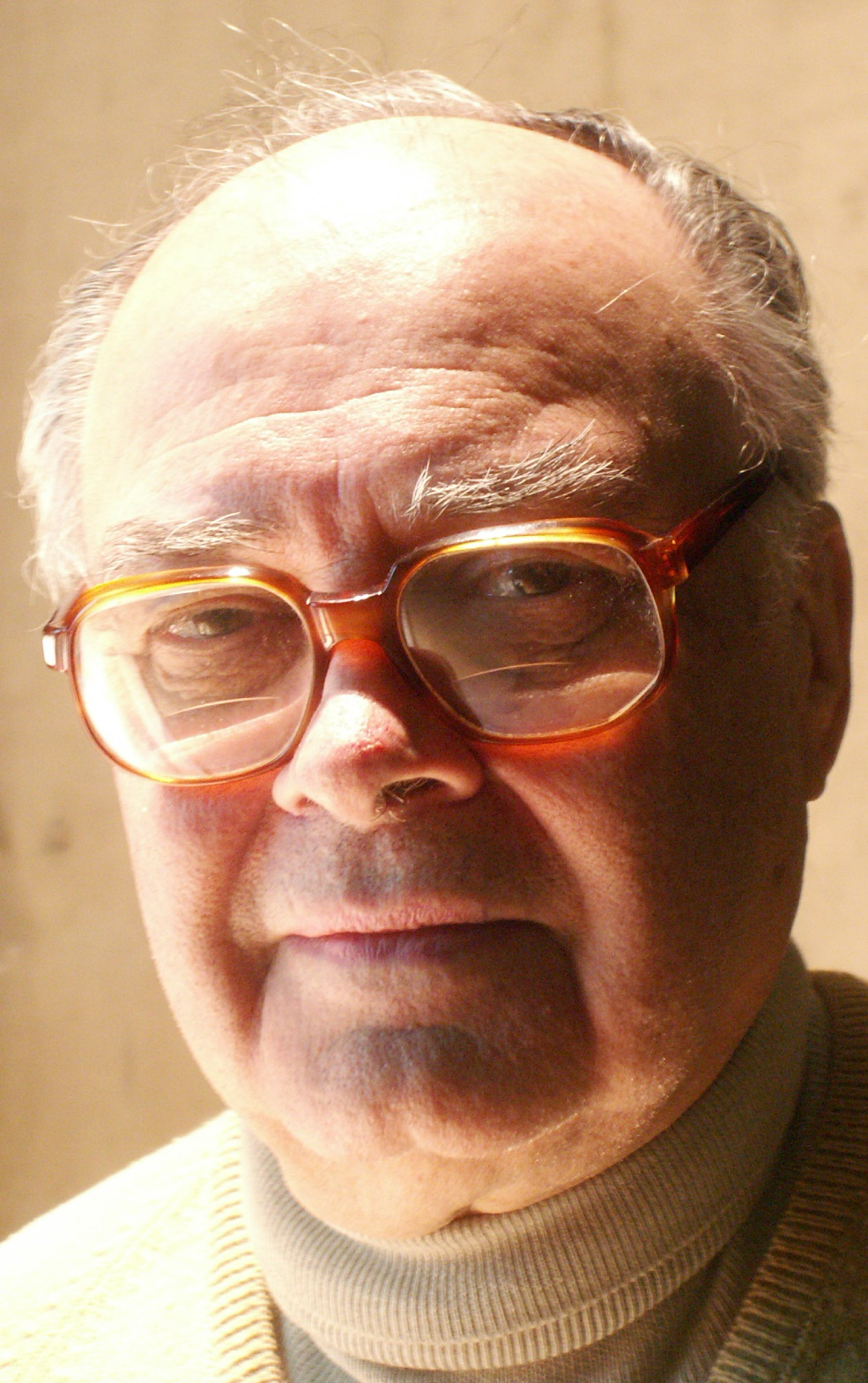
Hermann Mucke in 2008

Hermann B. W. Mucke (March 1, 1935 – March 12, 2019) was an Austrian astronomer and one of the most significant promoters of amateur astronomy in German-speaking Europe. He was born and died in Vienna.

== Career ==
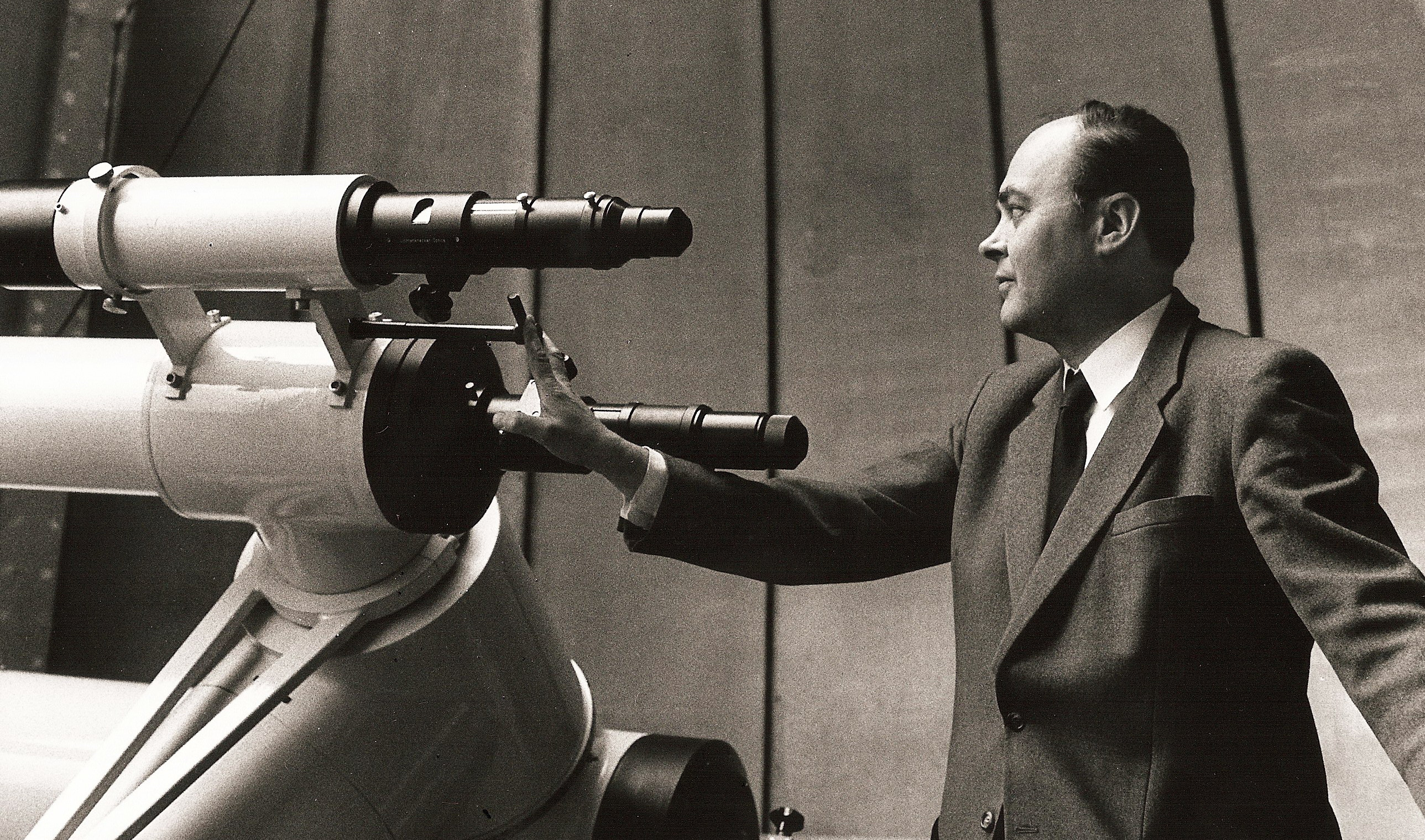
Hermann Mucke at the telescope of the Urania observatiory in 1981

Mucke studied physics at the Vienna University of Technology but under the influence of his teacher and mentor Oswald Thomas he soon took up the challenge of adult education in astronomy. In 1964 he was made head of the new Vienna city planetarium and made it an internationally reputed institution during his directorship. From 1971 onward Mucke was also the scientific director of the Urania educational observatory.

On occasion of his retirement from both positions in 2000, the asteroid 7074 Muckea was named in honor of Hermann Mucke. In the preceding months the solar eclipse of August 11, 1999 had further heightened his popularity, the media referring to him as Mister Sonne ("Mr. Sun").

Mucke's most significant scientific achievements were in celestial mechanics and in historical astronomy. He collaborated with Jean Meeus to compile a catalog of solar eclipses, and later another catalog of lunar eclipses. For a considerable time he was particularly concerned with comets, and published a catalog of comet orbital elements.

Although technically in retirement, Mucke continued to embark on new projects. Taking up a concept of his teacher Thomas, he designed and established a public celestial observation post with various multimedia enhancements (the Sternengarten) close to the Wotruba Church at the Georgenberg, a hilltop in Liesing on the Southwestern outskirts of Vienna. He continued to manage the Astronomical Bureau and to edit the Sternenbote, a monthly scientific periodical for German-speaking amateur astronomers which Mucke had founded in 1957.
