= Henry S. Horn =

American ecologist and natural historian (1941–2019)

Henry S. Horn (November 12, 1941 – March 14, 2019) was a natural historian and ecologist. He was an emeritus professor in the Ecology and Evolutionary Biology Department at Princeton University. He worked on a wide variety of topics including the following:

- the geometrical structure of forests
- patterns of forest succession
- wind dispersal of seeds
- spatial patterns of competition
- social behavior of butterflies

== Education ==
He completed his Bachelor of Arts at Harvard University in 1962 and his Doctor of Philosophy at the University of Washington in 1966. He wrote his Ph.D. thesis about the adaptive nature of the social behavior of blackbirds.

He was one of several scientists to have proposed the intermediate disturbance hypothesis.

== Books ==
Horn, H.S. (1971) The Adaptive Geometry of Trees Princeton University Press.
