= Sibusiso Khwinana =

South African actor and playwright (1993–2019)

- Born: 31 July 1993; Soshanguve, South Africa
- Died: 1 March 2019 (aged 25); Pretoria, South Africa
- Education: Tshwane University of Technology
- Occupations: Actor, playwright, director
- Years active: 2017–2019
- Parents: Nelson Moroakhalo (father); Chrestinah Tata (mother)

Sibusiso Khwinana (31 July 1993 – 1 March 2019) was a South African actor, playwright and director. He is best known for the lead role "Lefa" in the blockbuster film Matwetwe.

== Personal life ==
Sibusiso Khwinana was born on 31 July 1993 in Soshanguve township, Pretoria, South Africa to Nelson Moroakhalo and Chrestinah Tata as the third child in a family with four siblings. He had one elder sister: Joyce Noko, one elder brother: Muzi Moses and a younger sister: Malebo Francina.

== Career ==
He started career with many theatre plays after joined with South African State Theatre. After matriculation, he auditioned for a place at the State Theatre's Youth in Trust (YIT) project. Then he studied drama for two years at YIT. He was also a founding member of the "Independent Theatres Makers Movement" which was established to help with the funding of staged productions. In 2013, he became the founder and artistic director of theatre community organization called "Blank Page Entertainment". Using theatre he wrote and directed the stage play on homophobia and corrective rape in lesbians titled, Amend in 2016. The play later won the Best Production and Best Script awards at in the State Theatre Festival in 2016. Then the play was staged at the National Arts Festival in Grahamstown. Then he staged his own educational theatre pieces, called Don’t Start with an anti-drug theme.

In 2017, he played the lead role "Lefa" in the coming of age adventure comedy film Matwetwe directed by Kagiso Lediga. The film later became blockbuster with box office records. After the shooting of the film, he enrolled a diploma in Film and Television at Tshwane University of Technology in Pretoria.

== Death ==
On 1 March 2019, Khwinana and his friend Tebatso Mashishi waited for a taxi outside Sterland Mall in Steve Biko Streets, Arcadia in Pretoria. Around 11pm, the murder suspect demanded Khwinana's cellphone. Then they were wrestling for the cellphone and the suspect fatally stabbed them with a sharp object. Khwinana died on the scene with multiple wounds on chest at the age of 25. His funeral service was held in Soshanguve on 9 March 2019.

In March 2019, the police was able to identify three suspects responsible for the murder, but later denied. Later in July 2019, police undertook facial recognition tests to match the suspects to the person in CCTV footage.

== Legacy ==
A special half-price screenings of the film Matwetwe were held on 13 March and 14 March 2019 to commemorate the actor. In June 2019, the South African State Theatre renamed one of the six theatres housed in the State Theatre complex, "Momentum Theatre" after Khwinana titled "Sibusiso Khwinana Theatre".

== Filmography ==
Year	Film	Role	Genre	Ref.
2017	Matwetwe	Lefa	Film	
