= Tom Doncourt =

American painter

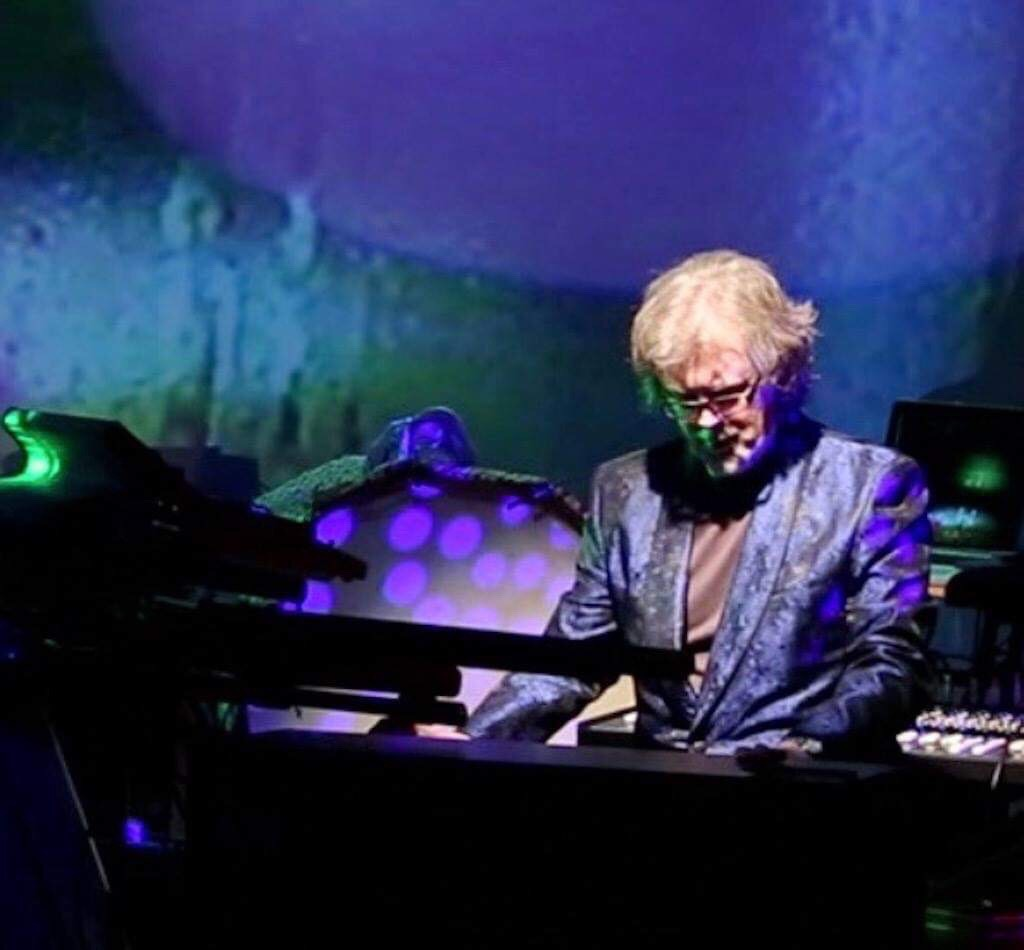
Tom Doncourt playing the mellotron during a concert at Symphony Space in Manhattan (2013).

Thomas Carlton Doncourt (December 10, 1955 – March 20, 2019) was an American musician, artist, and instrument builder, as well as a preparator at the American Museum of Natural History.

== Life ==
Doncourt was born in Flushing, Queens on December 10, 1955. His father was Carlton R. Doncourt, who served as a captain in the Homicide Bureau of the New York City Police Department, and his mother was Ruthene Staples Doncourt. His sister was Carol Doncourt DeFrancesco. They moved to Islip Terrace, Long Island in 1963. At the age of 17, Doncourt joined a band as a vocalist and also began playing the Mellotron. As a young man, he learned woodworking and worked as a carpenter. He also worked on pianos at Steinway & Sons, which eventually led to designing and building his own instruments.

His first wife was Gudrun Thrainsdottir, mother of his children Carly, Barry, and David. He later married Maxine Lu and had another daughter, Wendy.

In 2016, Doncourt was diagnosed with idiopathic pulmonary fibrosis, as a result of working with substances like resin and fiberglass. He died on March 20, 2019, in Brooklyn, New York.

Doncourt collected instruments, including an M400 Mellotron, a Chamberlin, an Ondes Martenot, and an individually designed M4000 Mellotron. Shortly before his death, he purchased a Mellotron from Streetly Electronics that was originally owned and used by Stuart 'Woolly' Wolstenholme of Barclay James Harvest. The Mellotron was donated to Abbey Roads Studios after Doncourt's death. In the final weeks of his life, Doncourt selected the tape sounds currently stored in the Mellotron.

== Career ==
=== Cathedral ===
Doncourt met the band Odyssey when he was 15 and learned to play keyboard from watching them. In 1974, he joined them as a Mellotronist. He performed two concerts with Odyssey and then put together a new band with guitarist Rudy Perrone and bassist Ed Gagliardi, who later joined the band Foreigner. In January 1975, Cathedral was formed when bassist Fred Callan and vocalist Louie Lovino joined Doncourt and Perrone after Odyssey disbanded. They also added drummer Barry Kadane, who had played in earlier groups with Doncourt. By 1976, Paul Seal replaced Louie Lovino, and Mercury Caronia from the band Industry replaced Barry Kadane. In 1978, Cathedral released the album Stained Glass Stories. It was recorded at Delta Recording Studios and produced and published independently, through Delta Records. For live shows, the band members would build their own stages in old movie halls, setting up the stage, sound and light systems by themselves. Stained Glass Stories was re-released on CD in 1990 by the prog label Syn-Phonic.

In 2003, Fred Callan initiated the reunion of Cathedral. They recorded the album The Bridge in Ian London Recording Studios with engineer/producer Brian Unger in 2007, which was distributed by Musea. Perrone left the band shortly after the reunion and David Doig was added on guitar. They played concerts at the Boulton Center in Bayshore, New York and at an outdoor festival in Sayville, New York. In 2009, Callan moved to Las Vegas and Cathedral disbanded.

=== Other projects and solo work ===
In 1979, Doncourt formed the band Quiet with Icelandic singer Gudrun Thrainsdottir, bassist Chuck Bernklau, guitarist Joe Armetta, and drummer Barry Kadane. Since the 1980s, Doncourt worked constantly on music on his own. He released seven solo albums, including Fauve, Blacklight, The Mortal Coil, The Moon Will Rise, House in the Woods, Ratsimandresy & Doncourt, Vol. 1, and Lantern (which was published posthumously).

Doncourt experimented with loops and tape effects and built his own instruments from the late 1970s. In 2002, he released his album Fauve, which was done entirely in MIDI, using a sampler and a Kurzweil. In 2009, the project FauveMuseum developed, featuring musicians like Penelope Thomas on vocals and Chuck Bernklau on bass tracks. He released the album Blacklight in 2009, premiering it in a live performance at Theaterlab on 14th St. in New York City.

From 2009 to 2016, Doncourt performed in an improvisational experimental ensemble called Globular Cluster, led by Jake Adams, doing shows in underground clubs in Manhattan and Brooklyn.

As digital recording became more accessible, Doncourt’s abilities to record, arrange, and experiment with music and self-produce projects grew. He started to record on the road and produced the music in his workspace in New York. Collaborating with the Swedish percussionist and composer Mattias Olsson, vocalist Cassandra Jenkins, guitarist and muse Yuko Pepe, he released The Mortal Coil in 2014.

In 2015, Doncourt released The Moon Will Rise, featuring Eunice Wobble Wong, Cassandra Jenkins, and Michael Wookey on vocals, with Mattias Olsson on percussion. Chuck Bernklau added bass on “April” and “Secret River.” Additional sessions with Yuko Pepe, Jake Adams, Sly Shippy, and Lydia Velichkovski became “Trip to Oregon,” Parts 1, 2, and 3. Doncourt played synths, electric and acoustic pianos, organs, the Jennings Univox, lap steel guitar, the Streetly M4000 and M400 Mellotron, and the Chamberlin on the album.

House in the Woods came out in 2017, this time featuring Kristin Slipp on vocals. Rudy Perrone, an original member of Cathedral, recorded the guitar solo for “Frontier.”

In the late 2018, Ondes Martenot master Nadia Ratsimandresy came to Doncourt’s Tower Mews studio for ten days. They set their goal to record an album's worth of music that could possibly be used as soundtracks. This was released as Ratsimandresy & Doncourt, Volume 1.

Doncourt produced a 10-song album featuring Mattias Olsson on percussion and Eunice Wobble Wong on vocals, called Lantern. It was released by Chuck Bernklau, Brian Lee, and Maxine Lu in 2020.

"Lantern," the title track of Doncourt’s final 2020 album, aches with nostalgia. In it, the speaker longs for the perfect world painted on a childhood lantern—a place where lovers dwell "in the spinning light forever," where the fire never dies and the stream never stops flowing. It captures a theme central to Doncourt’s entire life's work: the relentless search for enduring love. Written as he faced a terminal illness, lines like "the stone that [would soon] disappear" from a companion track carry a heavy, autobiographical weight. Yet, “Lantern” refuses to end in darkness. In its final stanza, hope breaks through. By gazing into that painted childhood world each night, the speaker internalizes the spinning light, nesting it deep within the lotus of his heart to become his own eternal, shining source.

=== Art ===
Doncourt was enrolled in the School of Visual Arts from 1994 to 1998. Four of his solo albums portray his original paintings on the front cover, including Blacklight (2009), The Moon Will Rise (2015), House in the Woods (2017), and Lantern (2020). His lifelong friend, Chuck Bernklau, contributed the magical photographic images on the back covers of House in the Woods and Lantern. Peter Zokosky, painted the cover of The Mortal Coil album (2014). Tom's girlfriend at the time, Lisa Schell, painted the cover for Stained Glass Stories (1978).

=== American Museum of Natural History (1992 – 2016) ===
In 1992, Doncourt became an Education Department volunteer in the early days of the Discovery Room at AMNH. He was mentored by Ann Prewitt and created puzzles, including the whale mask, and other interactive projects for the hands-on children's space. After that, he was hired to build models for the Structures & Culture Moveable Museum, and was subsequently offered a position with the Exhibition Department. He helped renovate the Hall of Ocean Life and built some exhibits for it. Doncourt was also part of the team that built the 28-foot-long Quetzalcoatlus for the show Pterosaurs: Flight in the Age of Dinosaurs in 2014. He was a Preparator, or Exhibitions Artist until he retired as Senior Principal Preparator in 2016.

While with the AMNH, Doncourt also worked on dioramas. He taught the public course The Art of the Diorama, where students learned how a museum diorama is created and how diorama and wildlife arts are instrumental to wildlife conservation. He continued teaching this course until shortly before his death in March 2019.

Another aspect of Doncourt’s work at AMNH, starting in 2002, was the traveling show program. He became part of a team that was sent to various locations to set up shows that he had worked on. He also served as a consultant with other museums on diorama restoration, as in 2018, when he helped restore the Hall of Fishes in the Vanderbilt Museum.

== Cover art for the Kyoto Visitor’s Guide ==
Between the years 2000 and 2017, Doncourt traveled to Japan four times. He was particularly interested in visiting Buddhist temples and gardens in Kyoto and Nara. During his final trip to Japan shortly after his diagnosis, Doncourt visited Sanjūsangen-dō, a Buddhist temple of the Tendai sect in the Higashiyama district of Kyoto, several times. He produced a detailed drawing in the Hall of the Lotus King, where1,001 statues and their guardians stand. That drawing became the basis for his final painting, a large canvas portraying multiple rows of golden Kannon with a guardian statue in the foreground. The specific guardian Doncourt chose to focus on is named Sakara Ryu-o (literally the Sakara King of Dragons). He relied on memory alone to recreate the colors. In September 2019, a kindred spirit, Lisa Schell, and her friend, an editor from the Kyoto Visitor’s Guide, expressed interest in using Doncourt’s painting for the cover of an upcoming issue, with an accompanying article about 'the immortal force of compassion and mercy' that inspired him at Sanjūsangen-dō. The magazine offered Doncourt's estate an opportunity to showcase his artwork, and his lyrics about the nearby Philosopher’s Path. The issue was published in February 2020.

== Discography ==
- 1978: Cathedral - Stained Glass Stories, Delta Records
- 2002: Thomas Doncourt - Fauve, self released
- 2007: Cathedral - The Bridge, self released
- 2009: FauveMuseum - Blacklight, self released
- 2014: Tom Doncourt - The Mortal Coil, self released
- 2015: Tom Doncourt - The Moon Will Rise, self released
- 2017: Tom Doncourt - House in the Woods, self released
- 2018: Tom Doncourt & Nadia Ratsimandresy - Ratsimandresy & Doncourt, Volume 1, self released
- 2018: Tom Doncourt - Blacklight (Remastered), self released
- 2020: Tom Doncourt - Lantern (posthumously)
- 2020: Tom Doncourt and Mattias Olsson - Tom Doncourt and Mattias Olsson's Cathedral (posthumously)
