= Lester Smith (philanthropist) =

American oil executive and philanthropist (1942–2019)

Lester Smith (August 16, 1942 – March 14, 2019) was an American oil executive and philanthropist, active in Texas.
