= Satish Kumar Chauhan =

Indian politician (died 2019)

MLA of Bhainsdehi
- In office 1985–1990
- Preceded by: Keshar Singh Chauhan
- Succeeded by: Keshar Singh Dadoo Singh Chauhan

Personal details
- Born: 1960/61
- Died: 29 March 2019
- Party: Indian National Congress

Satish Kumar Chauhan was an Indian politician belonging to Indian National Congress. He was elected as a member of Madhya Pradesh Legislative Assembly from Bhainsdehi in 1985. He died on 29 March 2019 at the age of 58.
