= Brian Gidney =

English cricketer and educator (1938–2019)

Personal information
- Full name: Brian Bruce Gidney
- Born: 6 April 1938; Kingston upon Thames, London, England
- Died: 18 March 2019 (aged 80); Subiaco, Perth, Western Australia
- Batting: Right-handed

Domestic team information
- Years: Team
- 1963: Cambridge University

Career statistics
Competition	First-class
Matches	1
Runs scored	16
Batting average	8.00
100s/50s	0/0
Top score	9
Catches/stumpings	0/–
- Source: Cricinfo, 26 January 2022

Brian Bruce Gidney (6 April 1938 — 18 March 2019) was an English first-class cricketer and educator.

Gidney was born at Kingston upon Thames in April 1938. He was initially educated at Arundel House School in Surbiton, before receiving a scholarship to Kingston Grammar School. From there he matriculated to Queens' College at the University of Cambridge, following a spell in the Royal Air Force doing National Service.

While studying at Cambridge, he played first-class cricket for Cambridge University Cricket Club in 1963, making a single appearance against the touring Pakistan Eaglets at Fenner's. Batting twice in the match as an opening batsman, he was dismissed in the Cambridge first innings for 7 runs by Asif Iqbal, while in their second innings he was dismissed for 9 runs by Farooq Hamid. Gidney also played field hockey for Cambridge and was selected for four years running in the Varsity Match against Oxford.

After graduating from Cambridge, Gidney accepted a teaching job at Charterhouse School, where he taught for around a year. In 1965, he was offered a two-year teaching job at Hale School in Perth, Australia, which he accepted. It was there that he met his future wife, a school nurse from a competing school, which led him to remain in Australia and become Head of Economics at the school. He remained at Hale School until 1985, before taking up a similar role at Wesley College, Perth.

Gidney was successful as a junior cricket coach, managing biennial tours of a Combined Public Schoolboys of Western Australia XI to England. For his services to coaching cricket, Gidney was awarded the Australian Sports Medal in 2000. Alongside his teaching, he was also a part-time lecturer and tutor at the University of Western Australia. He retired from teaching in 1997 and from his part-time lecturing in 2012. Gidney died at the Perth suburb of Subiaco in March 2019.
