= Pavel Machotka =

Czech-born American academic and painter (1936–2019)

- Born: August 21, 1936; Prague, Czechoslovakia
- Died: March 18, 2019 (aged 82)
- Education: University of Chicago; Harvard University
- Occupations: Professor of Psychology, painter
- Employer: University of California, Santa Cruz
- Spouse: Nina Hansen Machotka

Pavel Machotka (August 21, 1936 - March 18, 2019) was a Czech-born American academic and painter. He was a professor of Psychology of Aesthetics at the University of California, Santa Cruz from 1970 to 1994. He was the author of several books, including two about French painter Paul Cézanne.

== Early life ==
Machotka was born in 1936 in Prague, Czechoslovakia. He emigrated to the United States with his family in 1948 to escape communist repression, following the communist coup d'état. Machotka attended college at the University of Chicago at 16, and he earned a PhD in psychology from Harvard University.

== Career ==
Machotka was a professor of Psychology of Aesthetics at the University of California, Santa Cruz from 1970 to 1994. He was awarded an honorary doctorate from Charles University in Prague in 1998.

Machotka (co-)authored several books about psychology and the arts, including two books about French painter Paul Cézanne. His research showed that Cézanne was a realist, and that Cubists had misunderstood his work. In Cézanne: Landscape Into Art, Machotka juxtaposed modern-day pictures with paintings by Cézanne, as John Rewald and Erle Loran had previously done, but went further by emphasising Cézanne's realism.

Machotka was also a painter in his own right.

== Death ==
Machotka died on March 18, 2019, at 82.

== Selected works ==
- Spiegel, John; Machotka, Pavel (1974). Messages of the Body. New York: Free Press. ISBN 9780029304006. OCLC 925720708.
- Machotka, Pavel (1979). The Nude: Perception and Personality. New York: Irvington Wiley. ISBN 9780470264263. OCLC 877037621.
- Machotka, Pavel; Spiegel, John Paul (1982). The Articulate Body. New York: Irvington Publishers. ISBN 9780829002294. OCLC 869195344.
- Machotka, Pavel (1996). Cézanne: Landscape Into Art. New Haven: Yale University Press. ISBN 9780300067019. OCLC 34558348.
- Machotka, Pavel; Felton, Lori (2003). Painting and Our Inner World: The Psychology of Image Making. New York: Kluwer Academic/Plenum Publishers. ISBN 9780306474088. OCLC 816123050.
- Machotka, Pavel (2008). Cézanne: The Eye and the Mind. Marseille: Éditions Crès. ISBN 9782753700475. OCLC 926034870.
