= Marvin E. Proffer =

American politician (1931–2019)

Member of the Missouri House of Representatives from the 156th district
- In office 1962–1986

Personal details
- Born: February 4, 1931 Cape Girardeau, Missouri, U.S.
- Died: March 27, 2019 (aged 88) Oakville, Missouri, U.S.
- Party: Democratic
- Education: University of Missouri
- Occupation: educator

Marvin E. Proffer (February 4, 1931 – March 27, 2019) was an American politician who served in the Missouri House of Representatives. He was born in Cape Girardeau, Missouri and attended Southwest Missouri State University and the University of Missouri in Columbia, studying education. He served in the Missouri House of Representatives for the 156th district 1962 to 1986. He was a member of the Democratic party. He died in 2019 at the age of 88.
