= Laura Wooten =

American poll worker (1920–2019)

- Born: Laura Mitnaul; December 19, 1920; Goldsboro, NC
- Died: March 24, 2019 (aged 98); Lawrence Township, NJ
- Occupation(s): nurse's assistant food service worker
- Employer(s): Princeton Medical Center; Princeton University
- Known for: longest continuously-serving poll worker in the United States
- Spouse(s): Chester E. Wooten, Sr.
- Children: 5

Laura Wooten (December 19, 1920 – March 24, 2019) was the longest-serving poll worker in Mercer County and the state of New Jersey. She was also believed to be the longest-serving poll worker in the United States with a record of 79 continuous years of volunteering at the polls on Election Day. Wooten's dedication to working at the polls has inspired a new generation of voting rights advocates, including at Princeton University, where she worked part time until her death.

== Early life and family ==
Wooten was born in on December 19, 1920, in Goldsboro, North Carolina to Oscar and Leora Mitnaul, just months after the Nineteenth Amendment granted women the right to vote. Her family moved to Princeton, New Jersey when she was four years old. She grew up in the John-Witherspoon section of Princeton, which is a historically Black neighborhood. The neighborhood was named after John Witherspoon, a slave owner and former president of Princeton University.

Princeton was still an emerging town when Wooten was a child. In previous interviews, Wooten described horses and carriages going down Nassau Street and a trolley running from Witherspoon Street to the stores in Trenton, New Jersey. The town was segregated during Wooten's upbringing. Princeton High School had been integrated in 1916, but Black and white children went to different primary schools. The primary school for Black children was on Quarry Street, while white children had two public schools to choose from, as well as Catholic and private schools. Wooten graduated from Princeton High School in 1939. All Princeton schools were integrated in 1948, but racial inequities in the quality of education at Princeton High School have continued.

Wooten encountered sexism in addition to racism while growing up. She said in interviews that women's career options were limited at the time, so women mostly ended up doing housework. Many of her female peers did laundry for Princeton University students. The town of Princeton was in the shadow of Princeton University, which did not accept Black or female students until late in the 20th century and was known as the "southernmost Ivy. Meanwhile, Wooten's parents could not afford for her to go to college. She remarked that as a woman, she never expected to have a high-paying career.

Wooten was married to Chester E. Wooten, Sr., who died in 1990. They had five children, 16 grandchildren, 31 great-grandchildren, and one great-great grandchild.

== Poll worker ==
Those who can't dedicate the day, I say the least you can do is vote. Vote every time. Let nothing and no one stop you because your vote is your voice. It's the route — sometimes the very slow route — but, the only sure route, to change.

— Laura Wooten in an interview with NBC News

Poll workers like Wooten perform a variety of jobs that are essential to elections operating smoothly. 917,694 people served as poll workers in the 2016 presidential election, helping operate 116,990 polling locations. Approximately 56 percent of those poll workers were older than 61 and close to a quarter were older than 71. Almost half of election administrators surveyed in the 2016 biennial Election Administration and Voting Survey reported that recruiting enough poll workers is either very difficult or somewhat difficult, especially in large population centers.

Recognizing the need for diligent and dedicated poll workers, Wooten worked at the polls for most of her life. In 1939, Wooten's uncle Anderson Mitnaul, a Republican who was running for justice of the peace, persuaded her to work as a challenger at the polls for the first time. Her polling location at the time was the YMCA, which was then known as "the Colored Y". Today, the red brick building is the Paul Robeson Center for the Arts, which houses the Princeton Arts Council. That first time, Wooten worked as a challenger and earned $10 for checking voters off a registration list. A driver would take the list from her at the end of the day and visit each unchecked voter's house to pick them up and drive them to the polls. Voters used paper ballots, and Wooten and other poll workers would count the votes by hand because there were not any machines to tally the votes.

Wooten's commitment to serving as a poll worker was so strong that she worked at the polls on Election Day for 79 straight years. The Mercer County Board of Elections has confirmed that Wooten was the longest continuously serving poll worker in both the county and the state of New Jersey. She is commonly believed to be the longest continuous poll worker in the history of the United States. Wooten would often wake up as early as 4 a.m. to get ready for her job at the polls, and she would not return home until late at night. On one Election Day, Wooten missed her ride to her polling location, so she walked instead to make sure she could still carry out her duties as a poll worker.

Wooten also served a variety of other roles relating to voting, such as a crowd manager and a counter. She previously recorded and delivered precinct results, and also served on a board of elections. Before the 2016 election, Wooten expressed her hope that she would see a female president in her lifetime. She strongly denounced the claims of election fraud that have become more common in recent years.

Wooten received recognitions for her accomplishments from the New Jersey State Senate and Princeton Borough, as well of a variety of local and national organizations, including the National Association of Secretaries of States, the League of Women Voters of New Jersey, the Philadelphia Martin Luther King, Jr. Association for Nonviolence, the New Jersey chapter of the NAACP, and the National Newspaper Publishers Association, an association of over 200 African American–owned newspapers. Congressman Donald Payne Jr. of New Jersey honored Wooten on the floor of the House of Representatives on September 27, 2018. He praised her for her dedication to America's voters and called her a role model for all.

== Career ==
Wooten was employed as a waitress before working at Princeton Medical Center for 18 years. When she began working at the hospital, the workforce was segregated, with black employees required to work in either the kitchen or the supply center. Wooten worked in the latter, where she washed medical supplies by hand. After the hospital was integrated, Wooten worked as a nurse's assistant until her retirement in 1988. In an interview, she said she did not remember the year that the hospital became integrated, but she credits the change to the results of people voting. Wooten then became a teaching assistant at Community Park School.

At the age of 72, Wooten began working for Princeton University as a food service worker in the dining hall of Butler College, one of six residential colleges that contain living and dining spaces. She spent 27 years greeting students and swiping their meal cards to let them enter the dining hall. Wooten often described her job in the dining halls as play instead of work. At the ceremony for Princeton University's Hidden Chaplain Award, which goes to staff members who students nominate for playing a role in improving their college experience, one student wrote that Wooten was "more of a fixture of [their] Princeton experience than many of [their] professors" and that they hoped to be "half the community member that she seemed to be throughout her entire life." Two of Wooten's grandsons also work at the university.

Wooten moved to Lawrence Township, New Jersey after her husband died. One of the first things she did after she moved was figure out how she could work at the polls in her new town. She lived in her own apartment that was attached to her grandson's home.

== Death ==
Wooten claimed that her secret to a long life was eating healthy food and refraining from drinking alcohol and smoking. She was still working at Princeton University when she died on March 24, 2019, at the age of 98. Her last Election Day working at the polls was in 2018 at the Lawrence Road Firehouse polling station.

Wooten's funeral took place on April 1, 2019, at the Princeton University Chapel. Reverend William D. Carter of the First Baptist Church of Princeton, of which Wooten was an elder, led the service. In remembrance, New Jersey Governor Phil Murphy called Wooten a "moral voice of the state".

== Legacy and Impact ==
In 2020, both chambers of the New Jersey legislature introduced a bill called Laura Wooten's Law that would require civics lessons in middle school. The bill also instructs the New Jersey Center for Civic Education at Rutgers University to establish curriculum and professional development for social studies teachers. In the state Senate, the bill was introduced on January 14, 2020. It cleared the Senate Education Committee on February 13 with a vote of 5-0 and was referred to the Senate Budget and Appropriations Committee. An identical bill was introduced in the New Jersey General Assembly on February 25 and was then referred to the Assembly Education Committee. The New Jersey Education Association opposed the bill because state social studies standards already require civics lessons and they believed that there was not room in the school day for an extra class.

Wooten's long history of voting rights advocacy inspired a group of students from Princeton University, as well as other college students and high school students, to begin the Poll Hero Project, an initiative that recruits young people to serve as poll workers. The COVID-19 pandemic led to a shortage of poll workers across the country, especially because many typical poll workers are seniors like Wooten and they chose to stay home to preserve their health. In order to fill the need for more poll workers, Poll Hero Project organized social media campaigns to convince young people to step in to work at the polls as Wooten did for so many years. In total, Poll Hero Project's efforts led to over 37,000 high schoolers and college students working at the polls for the first time. The founders of Poll Hero Project specifically cited Wooten as a reason for their dedication to recruiting young poll workers.

Wooten was named an honorary member of the Princeton University Class of 2020 by the senior class. The Laura Wooten Institute for Civic Engagement was founded in her honor.

In the summer of 2021, The Council of the Princeton University Community (CPUC) Committee on Naming determined that a Princeton building formerly named Marx Hall should be renamed Laura Wooten Hall. This renaming became effective on July 1, 2022, and was dedicated to Wooten to honor her contributions through her long tenure as a poll worker and to showcase the significance of voting for civic change. This renaming also comes in the wake of the CPUC's commitment to diversity and inclusion being reflected in the honorific namings of places on the Princeton University campus.
