= Jennifer Pagliaro =

American singer (1983–2019)

Jennifer Ann Pagliaro
- Jenny - 2018

Background information
- Born: October 25, 1983; Abington, Massachusetts, U.S.
- Died: March 26, 2019 (aged 35) Santa Monica, California, U.S.
- Occupations: Vocalist, Songwriter
- Formerly of: Roses & Cigarettes

Jennifer Ann Pagliaro (25 October 1983 – 26 March 2019)

Lead singer & songwriter of the Los Angeles-based Americana duo Roses & Cigarettes.

She died of breast cancer at the age of 35.

== Career ==
Pagliaro was born and raised in Abington, Massachusetts, she also lived in Florida in her teens for several years prior to her moving to Los Angeles in 2004, eventually residing in Santa Monica .

In 2009 she auditioned for The Voice but was unsuccessful.

In 2015, she and guitarist Angela Petrilli formed a band named Roses & Cigarettes.

The duo released an eponymous 'self-penned' album that same year.

Pagliaro was diagnosed with stage II metastatic breast cancer just as plans were being made to tour in support of the album in 2015. She immediately underwent treatment. In 2016 her cancer came back and was then diagnosed as stage IV, but she continued with her plans for a tour.

Her second album of originals "Echoes & Silence" (2019) with her partner Petrilli was well received. Rolling Stone named her performance of the song "Fast as I Can" one of the 10 Best Country and Americana Songs of the Week in February of the same year.

On 26 March 2019, Pagliaro died at her home in Santa Monica, California.
