= Charles Mutschler =

Archivist at Eastern Washington University

Charles V. Mutschler (May 28, 1955 – March 10, 2019) was an archivist and Interim Dean of Eastern Washington University Libraries. He served as Assistant Archivist and Acting University Archivist and was hired as University Archivist in 2001. He became Interim Dean in 2018.

In addition to his work at EWU, he was an avid railroad and model railroad enthusiast, speaking locally on railroad history topics and authoring publications about railroad history.

== Early life ==
Mutschler was born in Albuquerque, New Mexico, and traveled around the southwestern United States while his father worked as a mining geologist. He attended middle school in Colorado. Mutschler received a BA from Eastern Washington State College (1977), an MA from Eastern Washington University (1981), an MA in Archival Administration from Western Washington University (1992), and a Ph.D. in History from Washington State University (1999). He had lived in Cheney, Washington since 1969. He was killed in an automobile crash on March 10, 2019, near Cheney, Washington.

== Publications ==
- Spokane’s Street Railways: An Illustrated History (1987)
- Wired for Success: The Butte Anaconda & Pacific Railway (2002)
- A Doctor Among the Oglala Sioux: The Letters of Robert H. Ruby, 1953–1954 (co-edited with Cary C. Collins) (2010)
