= Finn Willy Sørensen =

Danish footballer and manager (1941–2019)

Personal information
- Full name: Finn Willy Sørensen
- Date of birth: 9 May 1941
- Place of birth: Copenhagen, Denmark
- Date of death: 23 March 2019 (aged 77)
- Position: Centre half

Youth career
- Boldklubben Frem

Senior career*
Years	Team	Apps	(Gls)
1960–1967	BK Frem	140	(5)
1968	Washington Whips	32	(0)
1969	Gunnarstorps IF	20	(0)
1970–1972	Malungs IF	64	(9)
	Kramfors All.	61	(11)

International career
1962	Denmark U21	3	(0)

Managerial career
- 1976: Västra Frölunda IF
- 1977–1978: Landskrona BoIS
- 1979–1980: BK Frem
- 1981–1984: BK Fremad Amager
- * Club domestic league appearances and goals

Finn Willy Sørensen (9 May 1941 – 23 March 2019) was a Danish football player and manager, who later became a real estate agent. Sørensen started his career with Frem, before moving abroad to play with Washington Whips in the United States, and a number of Swedish clubs. Sørense was head coach for BK Fremad Amager from August 1981 until December 1984.
