= Ralph Allen (painter, born 1926) =

Canadian artist (1926–2019)

- Born: 1926; Raunds, Northamptonshire, England
- Died: March 26, 2019 (aged 92–93)
- Education: Slade School of Fine Art in London (1954)
- Known for: museum director, educator

Ralph Allen (1926 – March 26, 2019) was a Canadian painter.

== Biography ==
Allen was born in 1926 in Raunds, Northamptonshire, England. He graduated from the Slade School of Fine Art in London (1954). In 1957, he began working at Queen's University. From 1963 to 1973, Allen was director of the Agnes Etherington Art Centre at Queen's University. He was a professor of art in the Fine Arts department (1972–1987), and finally professor emeritus on his retirement in 1987. His work in the 1990s was in partnership with the Aboriginal Teacher Education Program (ATEP) at Queen's Faculty of Education, and he taught on reserves in Moose Factory and Kasabonika in 1995.

Allen exhibited in 15 shows prior to 1973, receiving several Canada Council grants, gaining critical attention through publications such as Canadian Art. He did not show his work again until after his retirement, with four shows of new works in the early 1990s. In 1990, he exhibited his work at the Agnes Etherington Art Centre in Kingston and at Rodman Hall Gallery in St. Catharines.

== Collections ==
His work can be found in the permanent collections of the National Gallery of Canada, the University of Leeds, Carlton University, the Government of Ontario and the Hirshhorn Museum and Sculpture Garden in Washington, DC.
