= Tom Maxwell (officer) =

Royal Air Force officer (1924–2019)

Thomas John Maxwell (19 June 1924 – 2019) was an officer in the Royal Air Force. He served as a Lancaster tail gunner (tail end charlie) during World War II. In March 1944, on his sixth mission of 32, his aircraft was hit by flak over Paris. He bailed out near Rouen, seriously injured by a loose parachute harness. He was sheltered by the Resistance and taken to Paris then Pau and over the Pyrenees into Spain. He went to Gibraltar and return to the UK. He was awarded an "immediate DFC" and commissioned, finishing the war in India. He retired from the RAF in 1978 and spent 10 years in the Sultan of Oman's Air Force. He retired to Devon in 1988. He died on 22 March 2019, aged 96. He was cremated with full military honours. He was the last surviving member of 622 squadron Lancaster LL828.

== Biography ==
Tom Maxwell was born in Belfast on 10 June 1924. He was the only child of John Maxwell and Mary Maxwell née Woodburn. They were from Co. Tyrone, John from Dunmore and Mary from Cookstown. John had come to Belfast to work in the Harland and Wolf shipyard. John and Mary were devout Presbyterians and Tom had a strict religious upbringing, but allegedly lost his faith during World War II. Tom attended Mount Pottinger School in east Belfast until age 16, when he left school to work as an accounts clerk in the London, Midland and Scottish Railway in Belfast. This was to support his mother, Tom's father passed away in 1937 from the effects of being gassed at the Somme where he was a private with the North Irish Horse regiment.

On 11 October 1941, Maxwell and two friends attended the government recruiting office in Clifton Street, Belfast and enlisted in the RAF Volunteer Reserve, Tom was Aircraftman (AC) 2nd Class service no. 1548296. On 14 September 1942 he was mobilized and took the boat train to London, reporting to the RAF Aircrew Receiving Centre (ARC) in the club pavilion at Lord's Cricket Ground. He was billeted in Viceroy Court, St Johns Wood. Maxwell recounted that physical training (PT) took place on the outfield of the cricket ground. One day the PTI (physical training instructor) produced a bat, a ball and some stumps for an impromptu game of cricket.

He started training as a bomber pilot and there was a rumour his group would be sent to Rhodesia to train. However, his group were told they were to be sent to RAF Topcliffe in N. Yorkshire to train as Air Navigators, something Maxwell definitely did not want. He reminded the RAF he was a volunteer and caused waves (he was already showing signs of being a 'bolshy' Ulsterman) by refusing to change training. This became a political issue - conscription did not apply in Northern Ireland and the UK government was keen to ensure the steady flow of ‘Loyal Ulstermen’ volunteers continued. The RAF issued Maxwell a 10-day leave pass and a rail/boat warrant to ‘think things over’. He went back to Belfast, dropped his kit bag with the Head Porter of the Midland Hotel and wandered around Belfast. At the RAF Recruiting Office he was persuaded to return to London, which he did the same day, and elected to train as an Air Gunner.

He started to train as an Air Gunner at RAF Morpeth, No. 4 Air Gunnery School a three-month course on Blackburn Bothas. After training he was posted to No 26 Operational Training Unit (OTU) at RAF Wing, Bedfordshire. At RAF Wing he joined Sgt. Pilot Peter THOMSON RAAF, navigator Sgt. Gordon STEVENS RAF, wireless operator Flt. Sgt. Peter JEZZARD RAF, bomb aimer Sgt. Bruce ‘Doc’ HYDE RCAF, flight engineer Frank HARMSWORTH RAF and mid upper gunner Sgt. Gwillian ‘Taffy’ PEAKE. Training continued on Stirlings, Wellingtons and Lancasters. The crew was posted to 622 Squadron at RAF Mildenhall in Suffolk, part of 3 Group Bomber Command. The Commanding Officer at RAF Mildenhall was Wing Commander ‘Blondie’ SWALES DSO, DFC and DFM. Maxwell was promoted to Sergeant and then Acting Flt. Sergeant. The crew were assigned a new Lancaster LL828 call sign GI-J, with only 12 hours flight time. Maxwell's 1st 5 combat missions from Mildenhall were (1) Aborted, bad weather forced landing at RAF Gransden Lodge, (2) Training. (3) Schweinfurt, (4) Ausberg, and (5) Stuttgart.

== Raid on Stuttgart 15th March 1944 ==
Tom's 6th mission was another nighttime raid on Stuttgart deep in the Rhur Basin of southern Germany. Tom was aged 19 years 8 months. After 'Bombs Away' over the target the aircraft rose dramatically and was immedtely hit by flak in the port wing. A wing of fuel was lost and the 'port outer motor'. THOMSON turned the aircraft towards Paris, the reverse of the route in. North of Paris Flight Engineer HARMSWORTH said there was not enough fuel to reach England. The fuselage was now on fire risking comms between Tom and the crew and flames were creeping towards the rubber hydraulic hoses controlling the rotation of his turret.

The crew was discussing whether to bale out or ditch in the Channel. Tom later wrote ‘The thing about baling out, in total darkness at night from a crippled Lncaster into water..... was a bit of a new thing.... the nearest one got was jumping off the top diving board into the warm water and brightly lit baths in Brighton in a flying suit and Me West. I was already well into a personal life saving situation and was totally disenchanted with the idea of ditching in the channel in total darkness at 100 mph with sea and swell conditions unknown. The idea did nothing for my morale at all’.

Tom decided to bale out unaware of what was happening in the rest of the aircraft. THOMSON piloted the aircraft another 40k before giving the order to bale out. The aircraft crashed into a wood near Lannoy, on the France / Belgium border. THOMSON describes the final moments in Silk and Barbed Wire. THOMSON, STEVENS and PEAKE became POWs. JEZZARD, HYDE, HARMSWORTH and MAXWELL evaded capture.

== Evasion ==
Tom landed in a ploughed field outside the village of Bazancourt to the NW of Paris and E of Rouen. During the descent he sustained a serious groin injury due to a loose parachute harness. He waited until dawn and walked into the farmyard of Tancre de MAERTENS.

Route taken from baling out to return to England.

BAZANCOURT, GOURNAY, PARIS. MONTAUBAN, TOULOUSE, PAU, NAVARREUX, follow a girl with red hair, who took us by taxi to MAULEON, From here we started to walk over the PYRENEES with two guides. These left us about 15 kilometers from ORBAICETA, PAMPLONA LECUMBERRI, Madrid, Gibraltar. London 23rd May 1944 interview by MI9 Major E. G Hughes.

Obituary in the Daily Telegraph Pyrenees along with 11 fellow RAF men. He was eventually taken to Pamplona by authorities and reunited with two crewmates. He was shortly thereafter sent to Gibraltar and sent back to England.

He was a strong supporter of the RAF Bomber Command Memorial.

== Honors ==
- Distinguished Flying Cross
- Legion of Honour, awarded 16 January 2018
