= Bernard Vaillant (volleyball) =

Belgian volleyball player (1948–2019)

Personal information
- Nationality: Belgian
- Born: 26 March 1948; Arlon, Belgium
- Died: 22 March 2019 (aged 70)

Sport
- Sport: Volleyball

Bernard Vaillant (26 March 1948 – 22 March 2019) was a Belgian volleyball player. He competed in the men's tournament at the 1968 Summer Olympics.
