= David Paintin =

British doctor (1930–2019)

- Born: 18 December 1930
- Died: 30 March 2019 (aged 88)
- Occupation: doctor
- Organization: Abortion Law Reform Association (ALRA)

David Paintin (18 December 1930 – 30 March 2019) was a British doctor and an emeritus reader in obstetrics and gynaecology at the University of London. He was a former chair of the Birth Control Trust and worked on the campaign to pass the 1967 Abortion Act. David Paintin died on 30 March 2019.

== Biography ==
Paintin qualified in Bristol in 1954. He trained under Professor (later Sir) Dugald Baird in Aberdeen before becoming a lecturer in obstetrics and gynaecology at St Mary's Hospital Medical School, London in 1963. From 1963-91, based at St Mary's Hospital Medical School, he organised the teaching of medical students and, as an honorary consultant, provided NHS services for Paddington and North Kensington. He joined the Abortion Law Reform Association (ALRA) in 1963, and was one of the gynaecologists who advised Lord Silkin and David Steel, now Lord Steel of Aikwood, during the parliamentary debates that resulted in the 1967 Abortion Act. He was chairman of the Birth Control Trust (1981–98), and a trustee of the Pregnancy Advisory Service (1981–96) and British Pregnancy Advisory Service (1996-2003).

He continued to work on abortion issues subsequently. He was editor of the British Journal of Obstetrics and Gynaecology for a period. In a 2015 book, Paintin reflected on the legal debates leading up to the 1967 Abortion Act and its subsequent implementation, and Parliamentary attempts to undermine and restrict Britain's abortion law in the 1970s and 1980s.
