= Hertha E. Flack =

American philanthropist and painter (1916–2019)

- Hertha Eisenmenger, from the 1938 Swarthmore College yearbook.
- Born: Hertha Emma Eisenmenger; October 10, 1916; Cleveland, Ohio, U.S.
- Died: March 23, 2019 (aged 102); Tryon, North Carolina, U.S.
- Other names: Hertha Flack-Monroe (after second marriage)
- Occupations: Philanthropist, author, painter

Hertha Emma Flack (née Eisenmenger; October 10, 1916 – March 23, 2019) was an American philanthropist, painter, and promoter of hiking.

== Early life ==
Hertha Emma Eisenmenger was born in Cleveland, Ohio, and was the daughter of Hugo Emil Eisenmenger and Charlotte Sonya Escherich. Her parents were born in Austria and married there before they moved to the United States. Her father was an electrical engineer and brother of physician Victor Eisenmenger; her grandfather was Austrian painter August Eisenmenger. Her parents divorced in 1936, and both remarried, her mother to prominent engineer Ernst Weber.

Hertha Eisenmenger graduated from A.B. Davis High School in Mount Vernon, New York. She completed undergraduate studies in zoology at Swarthmore College in 1938, and, in 1941, earned a master's degree in nursing from Yale School of Nursing. She also studied painting at the Bronx Botanical Garden and with Zoltán Szabó in Vermont.

== Career ==
In 1981, the Flacks co-authored a book, Ambling and Scrambling on the Appalachian Trail, about their eight-year project of hiking the Appalachian Trail as retirees. The book's cover photo shows the older couple, embracing and smiling while holding hiking sticks. They also toured giving lectures and slideshows about their hiking hobby, and radio interviews promoting the book. In 1985, they established the Flack Achievement Award and the Flack Faculty Award for Teaching at Swarthmore College. They also created the Foothills Equestrian Nature Center (FENCE) and the Polk County Community Foundation, in North Carolina.

Flack also painted landscapes and botanical watercolors, and exhibited her works mainly in North Carolina, as a member of Tryon Painters and Sculptors. She was still participating in local art shows in her nineties.

== Personal life ==
Hertha Eisenmenger married naval officer James Monroe Flack in 1941; the best man at their wedding was Boston Red Sox pitcher Dave Ferriss. After World War II, they lived in Massachusetts and North Carolina. They had two sons and two daughters. She was widowed when James M. Flack died in 1989, while the couple was traveling in the Soviet Union. She remarried in 1993, to retired dentist Wray Stockton Monroe, and was widowed again when Monroe died in 2001. She died in 2019, aged 102 years, in Tryon, North Carolina.
