= Helen Engle =

American conservationist and activist (1926–2019)

- Born: Helen Harris; February 18, 1926; Tacoma, Washington, U.S.
- Died: March 11, 2019 (aged 93)
- Education: University of Puget Sound
- Scientific career
- Fields: Conservation

Helen Engle (née Harris; February 18, 1926 – March 11, 2019) was an American conservationist and activist, focusing on wildlife around Puget Sound in the northwest United States. She co-founded various environmental organisations, including the Tahoma Audubon Society, the Washington Environmental council, Washington Wilderness Coalition, The Arboretum Foundation, Nisqually Land Trust, and Citizens for a Healthy Bay in Tacoma. Engle had traveled the world, including to Antarctica, to observe birds.

== Biography ==
Engle was born in Tacoma on February 18, 1926, and grew up in Oakville where she lived on the family homestead. She was studying nursing during World War II at the University of Puget Sound. She married Stan Engle in 1947. After the birth of her third child, she quit nursing and in the 1950s, she and Stan joined The Mountaineers. Becoming familiar with hiking through The Mountaineers helped her see how the natural land around her was being lost to logging and pollution. In 1969, after she and a friend, Thelma Gilmur, learned about a plan to develop Nisqually Delta, they organized the Tahoma Audubon Society. Eventually, Engle would go on to serve on the board of the National Audubon Society. Gilmur and Engle also created the Washington Environmental Council. As part of the Tahoma Audubon Society, she and the group protested land development in 1976. Gilmur, Bob Ramsey and Engle created Snake Lake Park, which was renamed the Tacoma Nature Center in 1979. Engle and Gilmur also created China Lake Park. In 1990, Engle led a sit-in at Congressman Norm Dicks' office because he supported logging salvage.

Engle died in her home at University Place on March 11, 2019, due to renal failure.

== Awards ==
- Thomas O. Wimmer Environmental Excellent Award in 1991 by the Washington Ecological Commission.
- Helen Engle Lifetime Achievement Award in 2004 by the Cascade Land Conservatory.
- Warren G. Magnuson Sound Legacy Award in 2011 by People for Puget Sound.
- Received an honorary Doctor of Science degree in 2011 from the University of Puget Sound (with Thelma Gilmur).
- Lifetime Achievement Award in 2013 from the National Audubon Society
- Posthumously awarded The Mountaineers Lifetime Achievement Award in 2019 by The Mountaineers.
