= Saiful Azam Kashem =

Bangladeshi film director (1947–2019)

- Born: 31 December 1947; Comilla District, East Bengal, Dominion of Pakistan
- Died: 11 March 2019 (aged 71); Apollo Hospital Dhaka, Dhaka, Bangladesh
- Occupation: Film director

Saiful Azam Kashem (31 December 1947 – 11 March 2019) was a Bangladeshi film director. He directed many Dhallywood movies.

== Biography ==
Kashem was born on 31 December 1947 in Comilla. His debut direction was Ontorale. He directed films like Sohag, Ghor Songsar, Duniadari, Halchal and Swamir Adesh. These films are selected for preservation in Bangladesh Film Archive.

Kashem died on 11 March 2019 at the age of 71 in Apollo Hospital Dhaka.

== Selected filmography ==
- Ontorale
- Sohag
- Ghor Songsar
- Bourani
- Sanai
- Dhondoulot
- Duniadari
- Halchal
- Vorosa
- Swamir Adesh
- Tyajyoputro
- Shakkhat
