= Steve Wormith =

Canadian gridiron football player (1946–2019)

Profile
- Position: Running back

Personal information
- Born: December 16, 1946; Sarnia, Ontario, Canada
- Died: March 28, 2019 (aged 72); Saskatoon, Saskatchewan, Canada
- Listed height: 6 ft 0 in (1.83 m)
- Listed weight: 200 lb (91 kg)

Career information
- College: Brown University

Career history
- 1970: Montreal Alouettes

Awards and highlights
- Grey Cup champion (1970)

J. Stephen Wormith (December 16, 1946 – March 28, 2019) was a Canadian professional football player for the Montreal Alouettes of the Canadian Football League. He was part of the Grey Cup-winning team in 1970.

== Career ==
Wormith may be one of the most unique Grey Cup champions in the history of the CFL. His name is engraved on the Cup for the 1970 season, but he never played a single official regular season or playoff game. He won the Cup as a player without ever playing a down of Canadian professional football.

Having graduated from Brown University and starring on their football team for 3 years, Wormith was signed by the Ottawa Rough Riders in 1969. He was cut from the team during training camp and played football at Carleton University, where he was studying for his Master's Degree.

Wormith was signed by the Montreal Alouettes in 1970 but injured his knee and was put on the injury reserve list for the season. As a team member, he qualified as a Grey Cup champion. He returned to the Larks in 1971, but was cut during training camp.

He later completed his PhD at the University of Ottawa. He was the Chair of Forensic Psychology, in the Psychology Department, University of Saskatchewan. Formerly, he was Psychologist-in-Chief for the Ontario Ministry of Community Safety and Correctional Services and Deputy Superintendent (Treatment) at Rideau Correctional and Treatment Centre. He died of cancer in 2019 in Saskatoon.
