= Joffre Stewart =

American poet, anarchist, and pacifist (1925–2019)

Joffre Lamar Stewart (17 April 1925 – 12 March 2019) was an American poet, anarchist, and pacifist known for his early participation in the early Beat movement. Stewart was based in Chicago; he is mentioned in Allen Ginsberg's 1955 poem "Howl".

== Early life ==
Stewart's book Poems and Poetry was published by the Every Now and Then Publishing Cooperative in 1982. Stewart received a B.A. from Roosevelt University in 1952.

Stewart was known for his anarchist "anti-"politics, his long-time participation in the North American anarchist movement, including his involvement in the Industrial Workers of the World and Chicago Area War Resisters Support Group, and was a regular contributor to the Bulletin of the Social Revolutionary Anarchist Federation (SRAF).

On April 29, 1994, Stewart was arrested while trying to attend a poetry reading at the Barnes & Noble bookstore in downtown Evanston, Illinois, after being mistaken for a vagrant, and spent 11 days in jail.

== See also ==
- List of peace activists
- List of anarchist poets
