= Ian Brown (Australian footballer) =

Australian rules footballer (1925–2019)

Personal information
- Full name: Ian Speirs Brown
- Born: 7 July 1925
- Died: 16 March 2019 (aged 93)
- Height: 178 cm (5 ft 10 in)
- Weight: 76 kg (168 lb)

Playing career^{1}
Years	Club	Games (Goals)
1944–45	Geelong	16 (0)
- ^{1} Playing statistics correct to the end of 1945.

Ian Speirs Brown (7 July 1925 – 16 March 2019) was an Australian rules footballer who played with Geelong in the Victorian Football League (VFL).
