= Georg Kreutzberg =

German neuromorphologist (1932–2019)

Georg W. Kreutzberg (September 2, 1932 – March 20, 2019) was a German neuromorphologist. Kreutzberg was long-serving director at the Max Planck Institute of Neurobiology in Martinsried near Munich.

He remained active as emeritus director at that institute. His various research interests have included microglia cells, neuropathology and nerve regeneration following trauma (especially paraplegia and quadriplegia), fraud in science, correct reporting of scientific research to laypeople and the history of neuroscience in Germany.

== Biography ==
Kreutzberg was born in Ahrweiler. He studied medicine, later specializing in Neuropathology, at the Rheinische Friedrich-Wilhelms-University in Bonn, the Albert Ludwig's University in Freiburg, the Medical University in Innsbruck and the University of Vienna. In 1961 he graduated as doctor from the University of Freiburg in Breisgau.

After working as post-doctoral scientific assistant, first at the Max Planck Institute of Psychiatry in Munich, then at the Massachusetts Institute of Technology (MIT) in Cambridge, Massachusetts, as well as at the Rockefeller University in New York City, he graduated with Habilitation in Neuropathology at the Technical University of Munich in 1971.

In 1977 Kreutzberg received a call to the position of Adjunct Professor for Neuropathology at the medical faculty of the Technical University of Munich. In 1978 he was scientific member and director at the theoretical section of the Max Planck Institute of Psychiatry in Munich (from 1984 situated at Planegg-Martinsried), which became the independently administered Max Planck Institute of Neurobiology in 1998. In 1993 he worked as visiting professor at the Brain Research Institute of Zurich University. In 2000 Kreutzberg received emeritus status, nevertheless has continued working there with lectures, honorary appointments and advisory activities.

He had memberships in numerous national and international research organizations. Between 1981 and 1985 he was elected President of the Deutsche Gesellschaft für Zellbiologie (DGZ), from 1994 to 1997 of the International Society of Neuropathology and from 1997 to 2000 of the German Neurowissenchaftlichen Gesellschaft. In 1991 he was founding member, and from 1994 to 2008 chairman, of the Scientific Committee of the "International Foundation for Research in Paraplegia" (IFP) in Zurich. From 1991 to 1998 Georg Kreutzberg was initiator, joint instigator and director of the European Initiative for Communicators of Science (EICOS). From 1991 to 2019 was a member of the European Academy of Sciences and Arts. From 2007 to 2008 he was president of the "International Society for the History of the Neurosciences" He died on March 20, 2019, at the age of 86.

== Research ==
Georg Kreutzberg researched as experimental neuropathologist on the cellular mechanisms of brain and nerve disorders, especially on regeneration and repair mechanisms in the brain as well as the role of glia cells in brain diseases. He was regarded as a leader in the investigation of microglia cells - the crucial defense cells of brain tissue. He discovered the blocking effect of colchicine on axonal and dendritic transport in nerve cells. Using the experimental model provided by the facial motor nucleus following axotomy Kreutzberg and his fellow workers discovered essential parameters of the regeneration program of nerve cells. Here, he developed also the activation concept of microglia cells, which revealed new directions for the understanding of many brain diseases.

== Honors and Prizes ==
- 1987: Rudolf F. Weiss Prize for fundamental research in neurology
- 1991: K. J. Zuelch Prize from the Gertrud Reemtsma Foundation
- 1991: Honorary doctorate of Dr. med. h. c. of the Albert Szent-Györgyi Medical University Szeged, Hungary
- 1992: GSF Prize for interdisciplinary cooperative research
- 1999: "Science in Dialogue" PUSH Prize for Public Understanding of Science and Humanities, together with Helmut Kettenmann, for the "German Neuroscience Society"
- 2006: Honorary member of the International Society of Neuropathology
- 2006: Visiting Professor and Orator for the 20th Peter Lampert Memorial Lecture, University of California, San Diego
- 2007: Recipient of the Order of Merit of the Federal Republic of Germany with "Cross of Merit, First class".

== Writings (selection) ==
- Cellular Biology of Ectoenzymes. Springer, Heidelberg 1986, jointly with Martin Reddington and Herbert Zimmermann, ISBN 3-540-15746-8.
- The Neurosciences at the Turn of the Century. Thieme, Stuttgart 2001, jointly with Norbert Elsner, ISBN 3-13-129761-1.
- Kreutzberg, G. W. (1996) "Microglia: a sensor for pathological events in the CNS", Trends in Neurosciences 19 (8) 312–318.
- Graeber, M. B., Blakemore, W. F. and Kreutzberg, G. W. (2002) "Cellular pathology of the central nervous system" in: Greenfield's Neuropathology, 7th edition, Graham, D. I. and Lantos, P. L. (Eds). Vol. 1, 123.191, Arnold, London ISBN 0-340-76221-7.
- Kreutzberg, G. W. (1987) "Dendrites, Transport and Secretion" in: Encyclopedia of Neuroscience. Adelman, G. (Ed.), Vol. 1, 319-320 Birkhäuser Boston ISBN 3-7643-3335-9.
- Kreutzberg, G. W. (1987) "Microglia" in: Encyclopedia of Neuroscience. Adelman, G. (Ed.), Vol. 2 661–662, Birkhäuser Boston ISBN 3-7643-3335-9.
- Kreutzberg, G. W. (1995) "Reaction of the neuronal body to axonal damage" In: The Axon: Structure, Function and Pathophysiology. Waxman, G. G., Kocsis, D. & Stys, P. K. (Eds.) Oxford University Press, New York. Ch. 19, Pp 355–374 ISBN 0-19-508293-1.
- "Kreutzberg", In: Lexikon der Neurowissenschaft (2000) Vol. 2 270. Spektrum Akademischer Verlag, Heidelberg, ISBN 3-8274-0452-5
