= David Gadsby =

British physiologist and professor (1947–2019)

David C. Gadsby
- Born: David Christopher Gadsby; 26 March 1947; Cardiff, Wales
- Died: 9 March 2019 (aged 71); New York City, U.S.
- Education: Trinity College, Cambridge; University College London
- Known for: studies on the mechanisms by which ions move across cell membranes
- Scientific career
- Fields: physiology
- Workplaces: Rockefeller University

David Christopher Gadsby FRS (26 March 1947 – 3 March 2019) was a British physiologist, and Patrick A. Gerschel Family Professor Emeritus at The Rockefeller University. He was best known for his studies on the mechanisms by which ions move across cell membranes.

He earned a BSc in 1969 and MSc in 1973, from Trinity College, Cambridge, and Ph.D. in 1978 from University College London. He studied with Paul F. Cranefield. He won the Kenneth S. Cole Award of the Biophysical Society in 1995. He was elected Fellow of the Royal Society in 2005.
