= Roy Eugene Davis =

American spiritual teacher and author (1931–2019)

Roy Eugene Davis (March 9, 1931 – March 27, 2019) was an American spiritual teacher and author who established the Georgia-based Center for Spiritual Awareness in 1972. Previously he had founded New Life Worldwide Inc. In 1967, he began publishing Truth Journal Magazine. By 1970 he had authored nine books. Davis continued to teach in the Kriya Yoga tradition for more than 60 years.

== Biography ==
Born in Leavittsburg, Ohio, Davis became interested in yoga at a young age. He read the book Autobiography of a Yogi when he was 18 and was attracted to kriya yoga and the author, Paramahansa Yogananda, who he "knew was his guru". After studying lessons from Yogananda's Self-Realization Fellowship and graduating from high school, he met Yogananda in 1949 and joined the monastic students at Yogananda's Self-Realization Fellowship. In 1951, he was ordained by Paramahansa Yogananda. In 1952, he was "appointed Minister of the SRF Center in Phoenix, Arizona", teaching kriya yoga.

He left Self-Realization Fellowship in 1953 and served in the United States Army Medical Corps at Fort Riley. Following his military duty, he began his ministry as an independent spiritual teacher, founding New Life Worldwide in St. Petersburg, Florida. Davis's relationship with Self-Realization Fellowship remained cordial, but some criticized him over the years, claiming that he did not have the authority to initiate people into the "secret" kriya yoga technique of Yogananda's lineage. He rejected these claims in his 1986 autobiography, God Has Given Us Every Good Thing. In the early 1960s, he began working with Edwin O'Neal of the Christian Spiritual Alliance (CSA) in Lakemont, Georgia, and he moved to Lakemont in 1973. When O'Neal retired from CSA in 1977, Davis took over as the chairman of its board and the head of its publishing house, which was renamed the Center for Spiritual Awareness.

Davis taught in more than 100 cities in North America and in Japan, Brazil, Europe, West Africa, and India. Some of his books are published in 10 languages and in 11 countries. He published the Truth Journal magazine and wrote monthly lessons for the Christian Spiritual Alliance members around the world.

He died on March 27, 2019, at the age of 88.

== Bibliography ==
- Davis, Roy (2010) [1960]. Time, Space and Circumstance. New York, New York: Frederick Fell Inc. ISBN 978-1163392843.
- Davis, Roy (2008) [1970]. Miracle Man of Japan. U. S.: CSA Press. ISBN 978-0-87707-048-1.
- Davis, Roy (1974). How You Can Use The Technique of Creative Imagination. U. S.: CSA Press. ISBN 978-85-7156-444-2.
- Davis, Roy (1984). The Science of Kriya Yoga. Lakemont: CSA Press. ISBN 99941-1-271-6.
- Davis, Roy (1995). Life Surrendered in God. Lakemont: CSA Press. ISBN 0-87707-246-9.
- Davis, Roy (1996). An Easy Guide To Ayurveda. U. S.: CSA Press. ISBN 0-87707-249-3.
- Davis, Roy (1997). The Self-Revealed Knowledge That Liberates The Spirit. U. S.: CSA Press. ISBN 0-87707-275-2.
- Davis, Roy (1998). The Path of Light. U. S.: CSA Press. ISBN 0-87707-277-9.
- Davis, Roy (2000). Seven Lessons in Conscious Living. Delhi: Motilal Banarsidass. ISBN 81-208-1750-8.
- Davis, Roy (2000). Seven Lessons in Conscious Living. U. S.: CSA Press. ISBN 0-87707-280-9.
- Davis, Roy (2002). The Science of God-Realization. U. S.: CSA Press. ISBN 0-87707-286-8.
- Davis, Roy (2003). Satisfying Our Innate Desire To Know God. U. S.: CSA Press. ISBN 0-87707-290-6.
- Davis, Roy (2004). The Science of Self-Realization. U. S.: CSA Press. ISBN 0-87707-292-2.
- Davis, Roy (2005). Paramahansa Yogananda; As I Knew Him. U. S.: CSA Press. ISBN 0-87707-293-0.
- Davis, Roy (2007). Absolute Knowledge; That Liberates Consciousness. U. S.: CSA Press. ISBN 978-0-87707-297-3.
- Davis, Roy (2008). The Spiritual Basis of Real Prosperity. U. S.: CSA Press. ISBN 978-0-87707-201-0.
- Davis, Roy (2009). The Eternal Way. U. S.: CSA Press. ISBN 978-0-87707-248-5.
- Davis, Roy (2008). Mystic Reflections. U. S.: CSA Press. ISBN 978-0-87707-204-1.
- Davis, Roy (2010). Self-Knowledge. U. S.: CSA Press. ISBN 978-0-87707-205-8.
