= Domenico Giannace =

Italian politician (1924–2019)

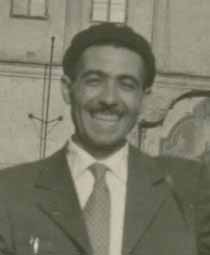
Domenico Giannace

Domenico Rocco Giannace (21 September 1924 – 28 March 2019), nicknamed "Mingo", was an Italian politician and trade unionist.

== Life and career ==
From 1980, Giannace served as a member of the Regional Council of Basilicata, a position he held until 1985. A member of the Communist Party (PCI), he also served as mayor of his hometown Pisticci from 1963 to 1965. In May 2003, Giannace was awarded Officer of the Order of Merit of the Italian Republic by President Carlo Azeglio Ciampi.

Giannace died on 28 March 2019 in Pisticci, at the age of 94.

== Orders ==
- 4th Class / Officer: Ufficiale Ordine al Merito della Repubblica Italiana: 2003
