= Tullio Gregory =

Italian philosopher (1929–2019)

Tullio Gregory (28 January 1929 – 2 March 2019) was an Italian philosopher and historian of medieval and early modern philosophy. He was professor in La Sapienza, Rome, and collaborated with several institutions, either in Italy or abroad. His work and interpretations have shed new light on Medieval thought and on the connection to early modern philosophy (from Montaigne to Descartes).
