= Hi Duk Lee =

Korean-born American businessman (1939–2019)

- Born: July 29, 1939; South Korea
- Died: March 7, 2019 (aged 79); Silver Lake, Los Angeles, California, U.S.
- Occupation: Businessman
- Spouse: Kil Ja Lee
- Children: 1 son, 2 daughters

Hi Duk Lee (July 29, 1939 – March 7, 2019) was a Korean-born American businessman. He owned more than 40 businesses in Koreatown, Los Angeles, including Korean grocery stores, restaurants and a hotel. He became known as the "pioneer" of Koreatown.

== Life ==
Lee was born in 1939 in Korea, where his parents were farmers. He studied engineering in Korea and worked in West Germany in 1966–1968. Lee emigrated to the United States in 1968, settling in Los Angeles, California.

Lee developed what came to be known as Koreatown, or "Second Seoul", in Los Angeles. As early as 1971, he built the Olympic Market, "one of the first Korean-owned groceries in Los Angeles", at Olympic Boulevard and Normandie Avenue. He subsequently built over 40 grocery stores and restaurants in Korean Village, as well as the VIP Hotel at 3000 West Olympic Boulevard, but he went bankrupt in 1982.

With his wife Kil Ja, Lee had a son, Roger, and two daughters, Susan and Helen. He died of colon cancer on March 7, 2019, in Silver Lake, at age 79.
