= Hugh T. Lightsey =

American politician (1925–2019)

Hugh Tuten Lightsey

Member of the South Carolina House of Representatives from the Hampton County district
- In office 1965–1971

Personal details
- Born: May 3, 1925 Brunson, South Carolina
- Died: March 22, 2019 (aged 93)
- Party: Democratic
- Education: The Citadel
- Occupation: Farmer, businessman

Hugh Tuten ("Hugh Boy") Lightsey (May 3, 1925 − March 22, 2019) was an American politician in the state of South Carolina. He served in the South Carolina House of Representatives from 1965 to 1971, representing Hampton County, South Carolina. Lightsey was born in Brunson, South Carolina and served in the United States Navy during World War II. Lightsey graduated from The Citadel, The Military College of South Carolina. He was a farmer and businessman. Lightsey died on March 22, 2019, aged 93.
