= Sternenbote =

- Discipline: Planetary science
- Language: German

Publication details
- History: 1958–present
- Publisher: Astronomisches Büro
- Frequency: Monthly

Standard abbreviations
- ISO 4: Sternenbote

Links
- Journal homepage

The Sternenbote (German for Star Messenger) is a monthly scientific journal on astronomy published by the Astronomisches Büro (Vienna). It was established in 1958, and contents include ephemerides of comets and other Solar System objects and observation reports. It is abstracted and indexed in the Astrophysics Data System.
