= Don Nice =

American artist

Donald Harry Nice
- Nice in his NYC studio in 1964 with his painting Strawberry
- Born: 1932; Visalia, California
- Died: 2019 (aged 86–87); Cortlandt, New York
- Known for: Painter, printmaker
- Movement: Pop art
- Website: donnice.com

Don Nice (1932–2019) was an American painter, printmaker, and educator known for his pop realism.

== Biography ==
Nice was born in Visalia, California in 1932. He attended the University of Southern California and the Yale School of Art. Nice served in the United States Army from 1955 through 1957. After leaving the army he spent several year in Europe. In 1959 he married Sandra Kay Smith.

Nice taught at the Minneapolis School of Art, the School of Visual Arts, and went on to be the artist-in-residence at Dartmouth College.

Nice's early paintings were in the Abstract Expressionist style. He abandoned Abstract Expressionism for Pop art. His work was included in the 1968 Vassar College Art Gallery exhibition Realism Now. His work was included in the Rubber Stamp Portfolio published in the late 1970s. By the 1980s Nice was incorporating landscapes of the Hudson River Valley in his work.

Nice died in 2019 in Cortlandt, New York.

== Work ==
Nice's work in many collections including the Metropolitan Museum of Art, the Museum of Modern Art, the National Gallery of Art, the Smithsonian American Art Museum, the Whitney Museum of American Art.
