= Edward Rubenstein =

American doctor (1924–2019)

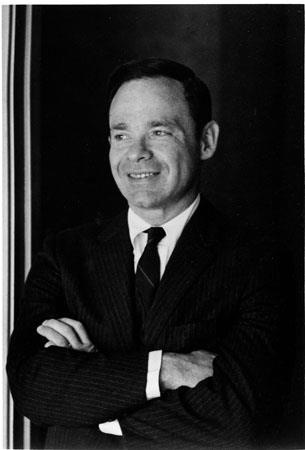
- Born: December 5, 1924; Cincinnati, Ohio, United States
- Died: March 11, 2019 (aged 94)
- Education: University of Cincinnati
- Awards: Member of the Institute of Medicine (1981); Member of Major Materials Facilities Committee, The Governing Board of the National Research Council (1984); Master of the American College of Physicians (1986); Kaiser Award for Innovative and Outstanding Contributions to Medical Education (1989); Fellow of the American Association for the Advancement of Science (1992); Albion Walter Hewlett Award Recipient (1993); British Medical Association Award for Editor of Best Book Published Worldwide (Molecular Medicine) (1995); American College of Physicians Laureate (2002)
- Scientific career
- Fields: Molecular biology, physics, medicine, chemistry
- Workplaces: Stanford University; National Research Council (United States)

Edward Rubenstein (December 5, 1924 – March 11, 2019) was an American doctor of internal medicine, with major contributions in the fields of medical education, research (physics, biophysics and biochemistry), and the arts.

== Mechanisms of blood clotting ==
Edward Rubenstein was an Internal Medicine physician, with areas of expertise which included clotting disorders that predispose to pulmonary embolism.

== Stanford Synchrotron Radiation Project ==
In the early 1970s Stanford University marked a landmark period in particle physics research with the creation of the colliding beam storage ring, called the Stanford Positron Electron Accelerating Ring (SPEAR) in 1972. Among the famous discoveries were the J/psi and tau particles. A byproduct of the ring's operation was an intense beam of synchrotron radiation. Rubenstein and his colleagues E. Barrie Hughes and Robert Hofstadter posited that there may be numerous applications of this intensely powerful, tuneable, and linearly polarized radiation to biomedical imaging, including intravenous coronary arteriography. They devised a synchrotron radiation based imaging system which has been used worldwide.

Rubenstein proposed that the polarized synchrotron light which is emitted by relativistic electrons orbiting neutron stars (linear in the plane of rotation, with opposite helicity above and below the plane) would selectively photolyze chiral molecules floating on grains in nearby space. This mechanism would produce an enantiomeric excess of either right- or left-handed molecules which can be delivered to Earth by passing comets.

== Nonprotein amino acids ==
In addition, Rubenstein pioneered research on the consequences of the misincorporation of nonprotein amino acids, especially the lower homologue of proline, azetidine-2-carboxylic acid (Aze). This compound eludes the gate-keeping function of the prolyl tRNAs, and enters a wide range of proteins. For instance, the central region in a consensus epitope of myelin basic protein consists of the sequence: proline, arginine, threonine, proline, proline, proline. Dairy milk from cattle fed sugar beet byproducts is high in Aze, therefore infants fed such milk are exposed to Aze in their diets.

== Editorships and authorships ==
Rubenstein contributed numerous book publications in the medical and physics literature. The volume entitled Introduction to Molecular Medicine was selected by the British Medical Association as the Best Book Published in Medicine in 1995.

=== Editorships ===
- Editorial advisory board, Current Contents / Clinical Practice, 1973-1986.
- Founding editor-in-chief, Scientific American MEDICINE, 1978-1994.
- Editor, Synchrotron Radiation Handbook, Vol. IV, North-Holland Publishing Co., 1990.
- Co-editor, Synchrotron Radiation in Life Sciences, Oxford University Press, 1994.
- Series editor, Molecular Medicine, Scientific, American, Inc., New York, 1994.

=== Textbooks ===
- Rubenstein E. Intensive Medical Care: Edward Rubenstein McGraw Hill, 1971.
- Tavares BM, Rubenstein E, Scott, AA, Paras M, Wilson A, Ney W. Tratamento Intensivo Technicas de Atendimento, Rio de Janeiro, 1975.
- Ebashi S, Rubenstein E, Koch M. Volume Editors, Handbook on Synchrotron Radiation, North-Holland Physics Publishing, Amsterdam, 1990.
- Huxley H, Ebashi S, Mitsui T, Schmahl G, Rubenstein E, Goodhead DT, Sasaki T, eds. Synchrotron Radiation in the Life Sciences, Volume 2, Oxford University Press, Oxford, 1994.
- Rubenstein E. Introduction to Molecular Medicine, Scientific American Medicine, New York, 1994.
- Haber E. ed., Rubenstein E, vol. ed. Molecular Cardiovascular Medicine, Scientific American Medicine, New York, 1995.
- Bishop JM, Weinberg RA, eds., Rubenstein E., vol. ed. Molecular Oncology, Scientific American Medicine, New York, 1996.
- Martin JB, ed., Rubenstein E, vol. ed. Molecular Neurology, Scientific American Medicine, New York, 1998.
