= Angel wing (disambiguation) =

An angel wing is a bird-like wing on an angel, a kind of supernatural being in mythology, especially Christianity.

Angel wing or Angel wings may also refer to:

- Angel wing, a syndrome that affects aquatic birds in which the wing feathers pointing out laterally
- Angel Wing (Glacier National Park), a mountain in Montana, US
- Angel wings, a fried dough pastry from northern Central Europe
- Angel wing begonia
- Pholadidae or angelwings, a family of bivalve mollusk similar to a clam
- Caladium or angel wings, a genus of flowering plants
- Cyrtopleura costata, the bivalve mollusc, known as the angel wing clam
- Opuntia microdasys, a species of cactus
- Pleurocybella porrigens, a wood-decay fungus
- Senecio candicans, an ornamental plant commonly known as 'angel wings'
- An element in the iconography of angels
- "Angel's Wings", a song by Westlife from Coast to Coast (Westlife album)
- Angel Wings (album), a 2013 album by Rainie Yang
- Angel Wings (California), a mountain
- Angel Wings (TV series), a 2016 television series
- Angel Wings (comics), an aviation bande dessinée by Yann and Romain Hugault
- "Angel Wings", a song by Madison Beer from Locket (album)
