= Wild Birds Unlimited =

American multinational retail chain

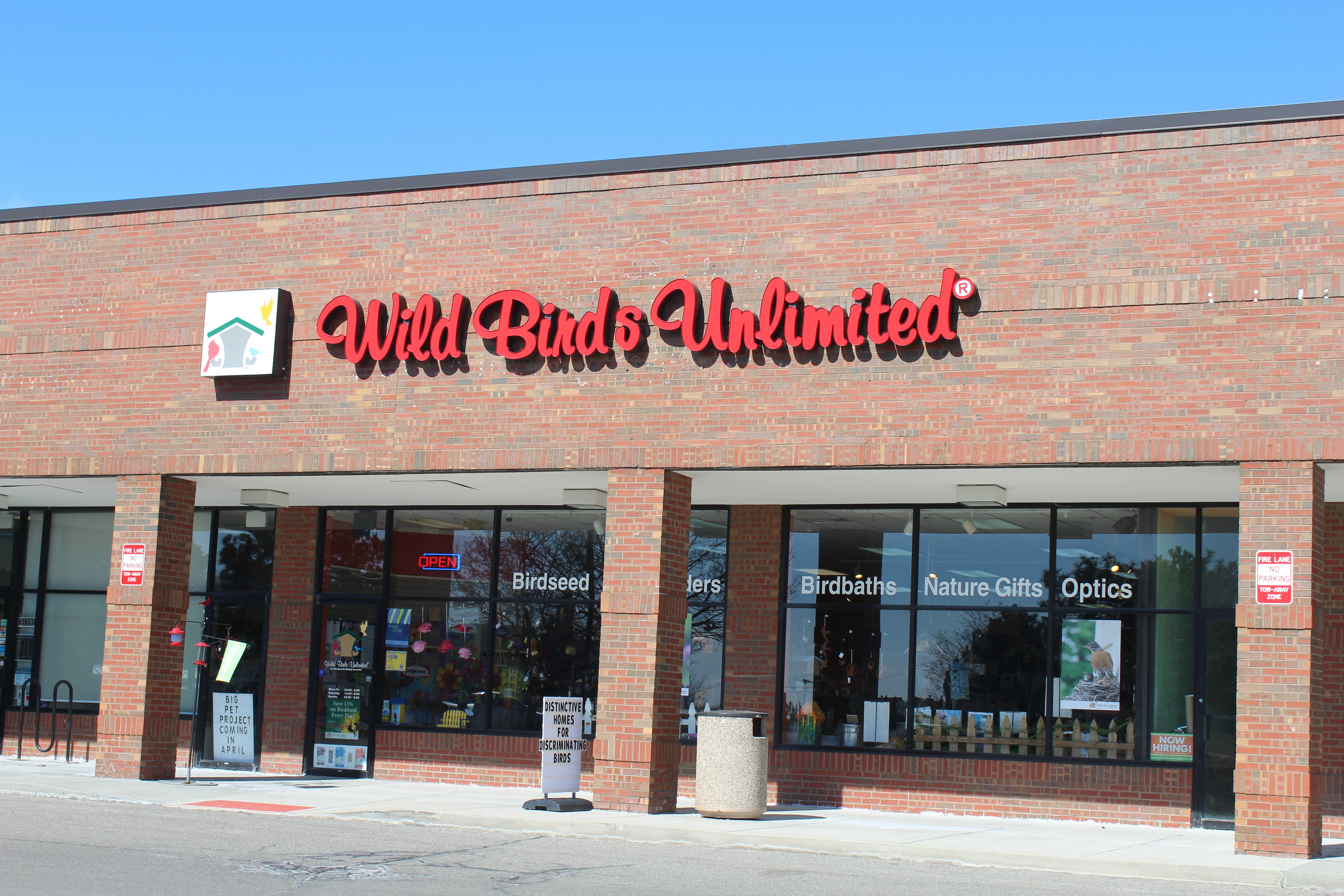
- Founder: Jim Carpenter
- Headquarters: Carmel, Indianapolis, United States
- Key people: Jim Carpenter (CEO)
- Products: Bird-feeding supplies Bird-watching supplies Birdhouses; Feeders; Binoculars
- Parent: Wild Birds Unlimited Inc.

Wild Birds Unlimited is a retail store that specializes in bird seed, bird feeders, and many other bird feeding supplies. Jim Carpenter opened the first Wild Birds Unlimited store in 1981 in Indianapolis, Indiana. By 1983, Carpenter started franchising his concept. Wild Birds Unlimited has grown to over 300 stores across the United States and Canada.

The company provides the products and services that help people bring birds into their backyards. The company works directly with well-known organizations such as the Cornell Lab of Ornithology, Audubon Society, National Wildlife Federation, and the National Fish & Wildlife Foundation to preserve wildlife habitat and educate people about wild birds.
