= Bird Watcher's Digest =

Example of a magazine cover

Bird Watcher's Digest was an American bimonthly birding magazine that was founded in 1978. Bird Watcher's Digest was the first consumer bird watching magazine, and is the only family-owned and operated bird watching magazine. Bird Watcher’s Digest occasionally partnered with and supported Wild Birds Unlimited and Wild Bird Centers as well as bird-oriented organizations including the Cornell Lab of Ornithology, National Wildlife Refuge Association, the Roger Tory Peterson Institute, and other nature and birding festivals. Although the original magazine folded in December 2021, it was purchased by new owners in March 2022 and, through the work of key staff members, continues its legacy as BWD magazine.

== History ==
BWD was launched in Marietta, Ohio by William and Elsa Thompson. Knowing very little about publishing, the Thompsons mailed out 32,000 copies of their first magazine in September 1978.

In 1994, Bill Thompson, Jr., left BWD to become vice president of his alma mater, Marietta College. His wife Elsa and their children continued to work for the company: Bill Thompson III as editor; Andy Thompson as publisher; and Laura Thompson as circulation director.

The business later expanded beyond the magazine. The company published a bimonthly newsletter (Backyard Bird Newsletter) and expanded into other bird-watching products, books and booklets, including the Bird Watcher's Digest Original Birdhouse Book (1979).

Many well-known individuals in the birding community wrote for Bird Watcher's Digest, such as former president Jimmy Carter, Roger Tory Peterson, David Allen Sibley, Kenn Kaufman, Betty White, Eirik A. T. Blom, Julie Zickefoose, David Bird and Scott Shalaway.

Although the magazine ceased publication in 2021, it was purchased from receivership in March 2022 by Big Year LLC, and will re-start publication with the July–August 2022 issue under new management.
