= National Bird-Feeding Society =

United States organization to improve bird feeding

The National Bird-Feeding Society (NBFS) is an organization in the United States whose mission is to make the hobby of bird feeding better, both for people who feed wild birds and for the birds themselves. To fulfill its mission, the NBFS conducts research and promotes education on wild bird feeding

Since its establishment in 1989, the NBFS has served as a resource for individuals to learn more about best bird feeding practices, and to provide information on how to move the bird feeding hobby beyond the backyard. The NBFS provides information on bird seed and bird feeder preferences, and a guide to better bird feeding.

Daily operations of the NBFS are performed by the staff of Wild Bird Centers of America in Glen Echo, Maryland, and supported by Wild Bird Centers of America, Inc.

== Bird seed preferences ==
In 2008, a three-year, one million dollar study of bird seed and bird feeder preferences in the United States and Canada was completed. The study, known as Project Wildbird, was coordinated by David Horn and Stacey Johansen at Millikin University in Decatur, Illinois, and funded by the Wild Bird Feeding Industry Research Foundation.

Based on results of Project Wildbird, of ten seed types most commonly found in seed blends, five are most preferred: black-oil sunflower, nyjer, fine and medium sunflower chips, and white proso millet. Three major patterns of bird seed preferences were observed. First, smaller finches, such as American goldfinch and pine siskin, prefer nyjer (also referred to as thistle) and sunflower hearts (also referred to as hulled sunflower and sunflower chips). Second, species that grab a seed from a bird feeder and eat it elsewhere such as black-capped chickadee, Carolina chickadee, tufted titmouse, and white-breasted nuthatch; larger finches such as house finch and purple finch; and northern cardinal, prefer black-oil sunflower seed. Finally, white proso millet is the preferred seed of ground-feeding birds such as chipping sparrow, dark-eyed junco, and mourning dove.

There are also bird seeds that are unattractive to birds. In particular, red milo is a seed few birds readily consume. Thus, bird seed blends with large amounts of red milo may go unused by wild birds and lead to a poor bird feeding experience.

== Bird feeder preferences ==
While there is a vast array of bird feeders, feeders are typically placed into three categories: tube, hopper, and platform. Tube feeders are long and slender and are typically constructed of plastic. Hopper feeders resemble small houses, and are made of a combination of metal, wood, and plastic. Platform feeders are large trays that are often covered and are typically made of wood or plastic.

All three feeder types can dispense a variety of bird seed types; however, there are specialty feeders for distributing nyjer and sunflower hearts or whole peanuts (peanuts that are out of the shell and split in half). Generally, tube feeders attract small-bodied birds, and larger birds are unable to perch on tube feeders. Hopper and platform feeders attract birds of all sizes.

Choosing a bird feeder is just as important as choosing the bird seed to offer. For those wanting to attract large numbers of small songbirds, a tube feeder is best. Hopper feeders attract a wide variety of species, and allow for large quantities of bird seed to be stored. Platform feeders attract the greatest number of bird species, but the bird seed is more prone to getting wet or blown off the feeder by the wind.

For individuals who want to attract more species of birds to their feeders, specialty feeders are available. Specialty feeders are made for suet to attract woodpeckers, nectar to attract hummingbirds and orioles, fruits to attract robins, and insects to attract bluebirds. There are also feeders specifically designed to hold whole peanuts, sunflower hearts and nyjer.

== History ==
The NBFS was formed in 1989 with the assistance of the Wild Bird Feeding Industry, the trade association for the bird feeding industry. In the early years of the society, the organization published newsletters, provided educational resources for instructors, and ran photo contests.

For nearly 15 years, the NBFS mailed a bi-monthly newsletter, "The Bird’s-Eye reView", to its members. The newsletter featured tips, tales, and tactics used for attracting wild birds. The society also developed a "Kit for Kids", a collection of materials for teachers, and two booklets: "The Story of Bird Feeding", and "The Dynamics of Bird Feeding". In its early years, the Society also held photo contests with individuals submitting photos in categories such as birds at feeders and most unusual feeder visitor.

Currently, the NBFS promotes education and conservation initiatives that raise awareness about bird feeding and the protection of wild birds both at one's home and beyond the backyard. The NBFS also sponsors National Bird-Feeding Month, held in February, to promote the bird feeding hobby.
