= NBM =

NBM may refer to:

- NetBeans Module, a software component for the NetBeans platform
- Basal nucleus of meynert, a nucleus of nerve cells in the brain
- NAMCO BANDAI Mirai-Kenkyusho, a Japanese entertainment holding company
- NBM Publishing, a publisher of graphic novels
- NBM Railways, Canadian railway company
- Narrow-footed bristly mouse (Neacomys tenuipes)
- National Bird-Feeding Month
- National Building Museum in Washington, DC
- Neo Black Movement of Africa, an international confraternity, often viewed as synonymous with the Black Axe crime gang
- New Britain masked-owl (Tyto aurantia)
- New Buffalo (Amtrak station), Michigan, United States; Amtrak station code NBM
- Nil by mouth, a UK medical instruction
- Nuestra Belleza México, national beauty pageant of Mexico
