= Bill Thompson III =

American magazine editor (1962–2019)

Bill Thompson III (March 3, 1962 – March 25, 2019) was the publisher and editor of Bird Watcher's Digest and the author of numerous books on birds and nature. He is also the author of Bird Watching For Dummies (1997, John Wiley & Sons), and author of 18 different state bird watching books in the Bird Watching: A Year-Round Guide series from Cool Springs Press (2005). He is the lead author for Identify Yourself: The 50 Most Common Birding Identification Challenges published by Houghton Mifflin (2005). He was the editor of All Things Reconsidered: My Birding Adventures by Roger Tory Peterson (Houghton Mifflin, 2006). His most recent book is "The New Birder's Guide to Birds of North America" (2014, Houghton Mifflin Company).

He wrote the Bill of the Birds blog and created a regular podcast for bird watchers called This Birding Life. He was an avid birder and musician and traveled widely performing, speaking, leading field trips, and consulting on ecotourism for birding festivals and nature events around the world.

In 2008, Thompson was awarded a Service Citizen Award from the United States Fish and Wildlife Service for his contributions in making the National Wildlife Refuge system more bird and birder-friendly. He was also awarded the Robert Ridgway Award for Excellence in Ornithological Publications from the American Birding Association.

In 2009, he was nominated for a "Heart of Green" award by thedailygreen.com for his work in fighting Nature Deficit Disorder by helping introduce kids to bird watching.

Thompson was married to artist, author and blogger Julie Zickefoose from 1993 until his death. They have two children and lived on an 80-acre property near Whipple, Ohio on the foothills of the southern Appalachians. In 2018, he was diagnosed with pancreatic cancer, from which he died in March 2019.
