= Julie Zickefoose =

American nature book writer, biologist

- Born: July 24, 1958 (age 68); Sioux Falls, South Dakota
- Education: Harvard University 1976- 1981, B.A. biological anthropology
- Occupations: Writer, Biologist, Bird Artist, Blogger
- Notable work: Baby Birds: An Artist Looks Into the Nest (2016)
- Spouse: Bill Thompson III (deceased)
- Children: 2

Julie Zickefoose (July 24, 1958) is an American nature book writer, biologist, bird artist, and blogger.

== Life and work ==
Born in Sioux Falls, South Dakota, Zickefoose has been drawing birds since childhood. The bird artist Robert Verity Clem (1933-2010) encouraged her to draw living birds in nature. She describes the work of Lars Jonsson as one of her main influences.

After studying art, anthropology and biology from 1976, she obtained a Bachelor of Arts degree from Harvard University in 1981. While a student, she spent five months as a field biology assistant in Amazonian Brazil. She worked during the summers from 1981 to 1986 as a field biologist for the Nature Conservancy in Connecticut. She was commissioned as part of the illustrator team for the American Ornithologists' Union and the Academy of Natural Sciences for the eighteen-volume work Birds of North America from 1991 to 2002. She has also illustrated educational material for the Cornell Laboratory of Ornithology, the United States Fish and Wildlife Service, and the Smithsonian Migratory Bird Center.

Zickefoose has presented her lectures and illustrations at universities, museums, galleries and festivals throughout the United States. Her articles and illustrations have been published in a variety of journals, including The New Yorker, Smithsonian Magazine, Country Journal, and Bird Watcher's Digest, for which she has designed 17 title covers. She was married to an editor of the latter journal, William Henry Thompson III (1962–2019), from 1993 until his death in March 2019, and has a daughter and a son.

Zickefoose's early books dealt with birdwatching in the backyard. The guide Enjoying Bluebirds More from 1993 offers birdwatchers assistance in creating bird boxes for bluebirds and includes illustrations and colour photographs. Enjoying Bird Feeding More: Great Ideas for Your Backyard is a guide from 1995, that includes tips for feeding birds in the garden and attracting birds. Enjoying Woodpeckers More from 2003 is a guide to identifying woodpeckers.

In 2006, Zickefoose published Letters from Eden: A Year at Home, in the Woods, a compilation of columns she wrote for Bird Watcher's Digest. Arranged by seasons, the essays describe her daily excursions and observations of wild turkeys, box turtles, coyotes and other animals from the forests of her home country.

The book The Bluebird Effect: Uncommon Bonds with Common Birds was published in 2012. Illustrated by Zickefoose with 216 paintings and sketches, this work reports on 25 species of birds that she has observed in different seasons around her 80 acre sanctuary near Whipple in the southern Appalachian Mountains of Ohio. Each chapter deals with one bird species, including the little tern, the northern cardinal, the Savannah sparrow, the scarlet tanager, the orchard oriole, the common starling, the piping plover, the turkey vulture, the barn swallow, the eastern phoebe, the ivory-billed woodpecker and some endangered species. It also contains stories about the rehabilitation of injured birds and diary entries in which Zickefoose describes her observations. In the book she also tells her seven-year study of Mr. Troyer, the namesake bluebird, who has fathered 53 chicks despite an injured wing caused by the attack of a falcon.

In addition to North American birds, Zickefoose also illustrates Neotropical species.

A black tupelo in the Dawes Arboretum was dedicated to Julie Zickefoose in 2014.

In January 2021, Zickefoose began working with a team to bring back Bird Watcher's Digest magazine. Its first issue appeared in July 2022 with her painting of a Henslow's sparrow on the cover.

== Selected works ==
=== As writer ===
- Enjoying Bluebirds More. Pardson, Marietta, Ohio 1993.
- Enjoying Bird Feeding More: Great Ideas for Your Backyard. Bird Watcher's Digest Press, Marietta, Ohio 1995.
- Natural Gardening for Birds: The Bird-Friendly Backyard; Simple Ways to Create a Bird Haven. Rodale, Emmaus, Pennsylvania 2001. (also illustrator)
- Enjoying Woodpeckers More. Bird Watcher's Digest Press, Marietta, Ohio, 2003.
- with Bill Thompson III, Kenn Kaufman: Identify Yourself: The 50 Most Common Birding Identification Challenges. Houghton Mifflin, Boston, Massachusetts 2005.
- Letters from Eden: A Year at Home, in the Woods. Houghton Mifflin, Boston, Massachusetts, 2006.
- Backyard Birding: Using Natural Gardening to Attract Birds, Skyhorse Publishing, 2011.
- The Bluebird Effect: Uncommon Bonds with Common Birds. Houghton Mifflin Harcourt, Boston, Massachusetts, 2012. (also illustrator)
- Baby Birds: An Artist Looks into the Nest. Houghton Mifflin Harcourt, Boston, Massachusetts, 2016. (also illustrator)
- Saving Jemima: Life and Love with a Hard-luck Jay. Houghton Mifflin Harcourt, Boston, Massachusetts, 2019.

=== As illustrator ===
- Jonathan Pine: Backyard Birds. HarperCollins, New York City 1993.
- Robert A. Askins: Restoring North America's Bird: Lessons from Landscape Ecology. Yale University Press, New Haven, Connecticut, 2002.
- Calvin Simonds: Private Lives of Garden Birds. Storey Publishing, North Adams, Massachusetts 2002.
- Ora E. Anderson: Out of the Woods: A Bird Watcher's Year. Ohio University Press, Athens, Ohio 2007.
- Michael DiGiorgio, Bill Thompson III: The Young Birder's Guide to Birds of Eastern North America. 2nd edition, Houghton Mifflin Co., Boston, Massachusetts 2012.
- Bill Thompson III: The Young Birder's Guide to Birds of North America. Houghton Mifflin, Boston, Massachusetts 2008.
