= W. R. Sullivan =

Inventor of an early hummingbird feeder

W. R. (Robert) Sullivan was the inventor of an early hummingbird feeder as well as an advocate for banding hummingbirds and hummingbirds living in zoos.

In 1932, Sullivan invented a hummingbird feeder designed to prevent other birds or insects from drinking from it, which he produced and sold locally around Kerrville, Texas. He used both Heinz vinegar bottles and IV bottles for his feeders. No later than 1936, Sullivan had hung a hummingbird feeder outside his patient room at the Veterans Administration Hospital at Legion, Texas, near Kerrville. In total, he had placed around 25 of these feeders around the hospital's grounds. In 1939, Sullivan noted that hummingbirds would drink one US quart (950 ml) of the sweetened water solution he put in his feeder every day. His feeder design was used by both fellow patients at the hospital as well as residents of Kerrville.

In 1936, Sullivan applied for a bird-banding permit for black-chinned hummingbirds, but was rejected by F. C. Lincoln of the Division of Wildlife Research with the rationale that hummingbirds were so small that it was impossible to create properly fitting bands for them.

In July 1941, Sullivan attempted to airmail hummingbirds from Texas to the New York Zoological Park in New York City, but the birds died in transit. In May 1942, Sullivan successfully shipped black-chinned hummingbirds from Legion to Forest Park Zoo in Fort Worth, Texas.
