= Bird food plants =

Plants bearing fruit eaten by birds

Bird food plants are certain trees, shrubs and herbaceous plants bearing fruits which afford food for birds. These have been discovered by observation, and by the scientific examination of the contents of birds' stomachs. By planting those species, therefore, which have been proved most desirable and that are suited to the climate and soil of the chosen location, birds can be attracted to the vicinity of dwelling houses or to any other desired spot as a copse or shrubbery, or, on the other hand, lured away from valuable orchards, since they appear to like best arid, bitter, sour or aromatic fruits, distasteful to human beings, even better than the cultivated kinds.

Many of these bird-attracting plants are ornamental as well, since many have bright red fruit. These fruits often cling to their branches far into the winter, additions to the meager fare of hard-weather birds.

== Plant genera ==
=== Trees ===
- figs (Ficus)
- wild olive (Olea)
- wild cherries (Prunus)
- nettle trees (Celtis)
- tree fuchsias (Halleria)
- dogwoods (Cornus)
- pepper tree (Schinus)
- pepperidge (Nyssa)
- persimmons or ebony trees (Diospyros)
- China tree (Melia)
- pines (Pinus)
- oaks (Quercus)
- magnolias (Magnolia)
- maples (Acer)
- manzanita (Arctostaphylos)
- cedars and junipers (Juniperus)
- hollies (Ilex)
- mountain ashes (Pyrus)
- hackberries (Celtis)
- sassafras (Sassafras)
- hawthorns (Crataegus)
- mulberries (Morus)
- palm trees (several genera including Phoenix, Raphia and others)

=== Shrubs ===
- bietou or boneseed (Chrysanthemoides)
- cotoneaster or firethorn (Cotoneaster)
- elders (Sambucus)
- serviceberries or juneberries (Amelanchier)
- wild roses (Rosa)
- spurges (Euphorbia)
- snowberries (Symphoricarpos)
- buckthorns or lotebushes (Ziziphus)
- sumachs (Rhus)
- karees (Searsia)
- spicebush (Benzoin)
- pokeberry (Phytolacca)
- raisin bushes or crossberries (Grewia)
- cornels Cornus)
- bearberry (Arctostaphylos)
- silverberry (Eleagnus)
- buffalo berry (Shepherdia)
- loquat (Eriobotrya)
- buckthorn (Rhamnus)
- bayberries (Myrica)
- alders or hollies (Ilex)
- viburnums (Viburnum)
- bluewood (Condalia)
- nockaway (Ehretia)
- barberry (Berberis)

=== Vines ===
- wild grapes (Vitis and related genera such as Rhoicissus)
- Virginia creeper (Parthenocissus quinquefolia)
- bittersweet (Celastrus)
- hog peanut (Amphicarpaea)
- milk pea (Galactia)

== Birds ==
=== Sparrows ===
The many sparrows feed chiefly on weed seeds, but more acceptable plants from the gardener's point of view can be offered to them:

- so-called millets (Panicum, Setaria, Eleusine)
- princes' feather (Amaranthus, Polygonum)
- chamomiles, white and yellow (Anthemis)
- California poppy (Eschscholzia californica)
- tarweed (Madia)
- bachelor's buttons (Centaurea)

=== Ducks ===
Wild ducks are attracted by several aquatic and semi-aquatic plants, among the most important being:

- wild rice (Zizania)
- wild celery, or tape-grass (Vallisneria)
- pondweeds (Potamogeton)
- arrowheads, also called wapato and the Delta duck potato (Sagittaria)
- wild millet (Echinochloa)
- chufa tubers (Cyperus)

== See also ==
- Nectar source
- Bird feeding
