= Bird feeding =

Activity of feeding wild birds

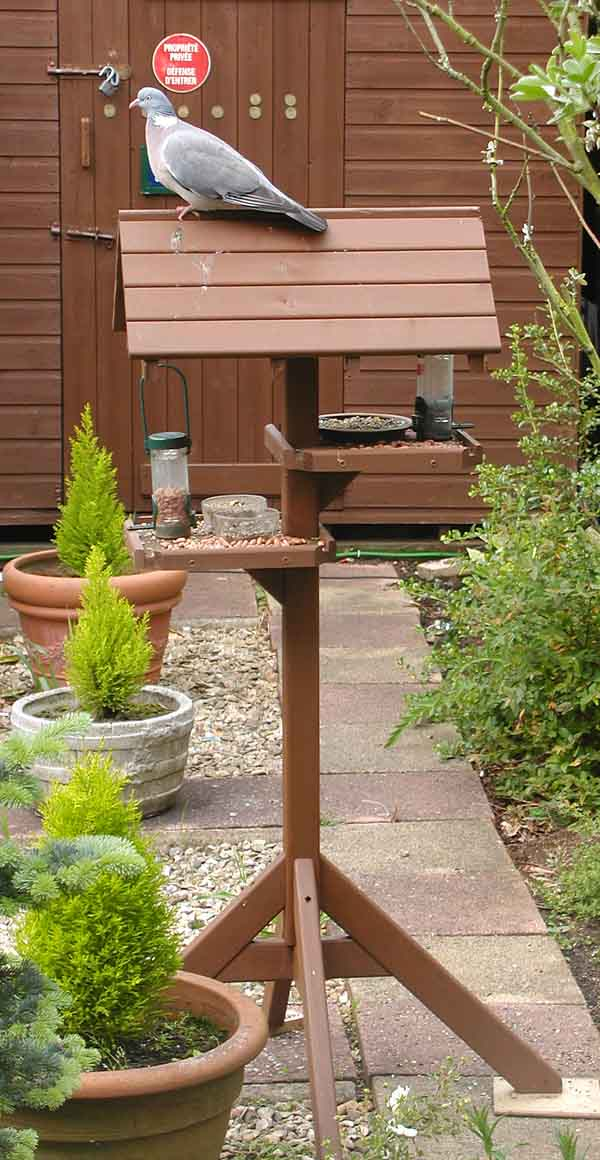
A bird table, with a wood pigeon on the roof, in an English garden. The table provides water, peanuts, sunflower seeds and a seed mix.

A mallard (male) eats rolled oats from the hand.

Bird feeding is the activity of feeding wild birds, often by means of bird feeders. With a recorded history dating to the 6th century, the feeding of wild birds has been encouraged and celebrated in the United States and United Kingdom, with it being the United States' second most popular hobby having National Bird-Feeding Month congressionally decreed in 1994. Various types of food are provided by various methods; certain combinations of food and method of feeding are known to attract certain bird species.

The feeding of wild birds has been shown to have possible negative as well as positive effects; while a study in Sheffield, England found that the abundance of garden birds increased with levels of bird feeding, multiple reports suggest that bird feeding may have various negative ecological effects and may be detrimental to the birds being fed, including increased risk of predatory action and malnutrition. It has been estimated that American adults spend approximately US$3.8 billion a year on food, feeders and related accessories.

== History ==
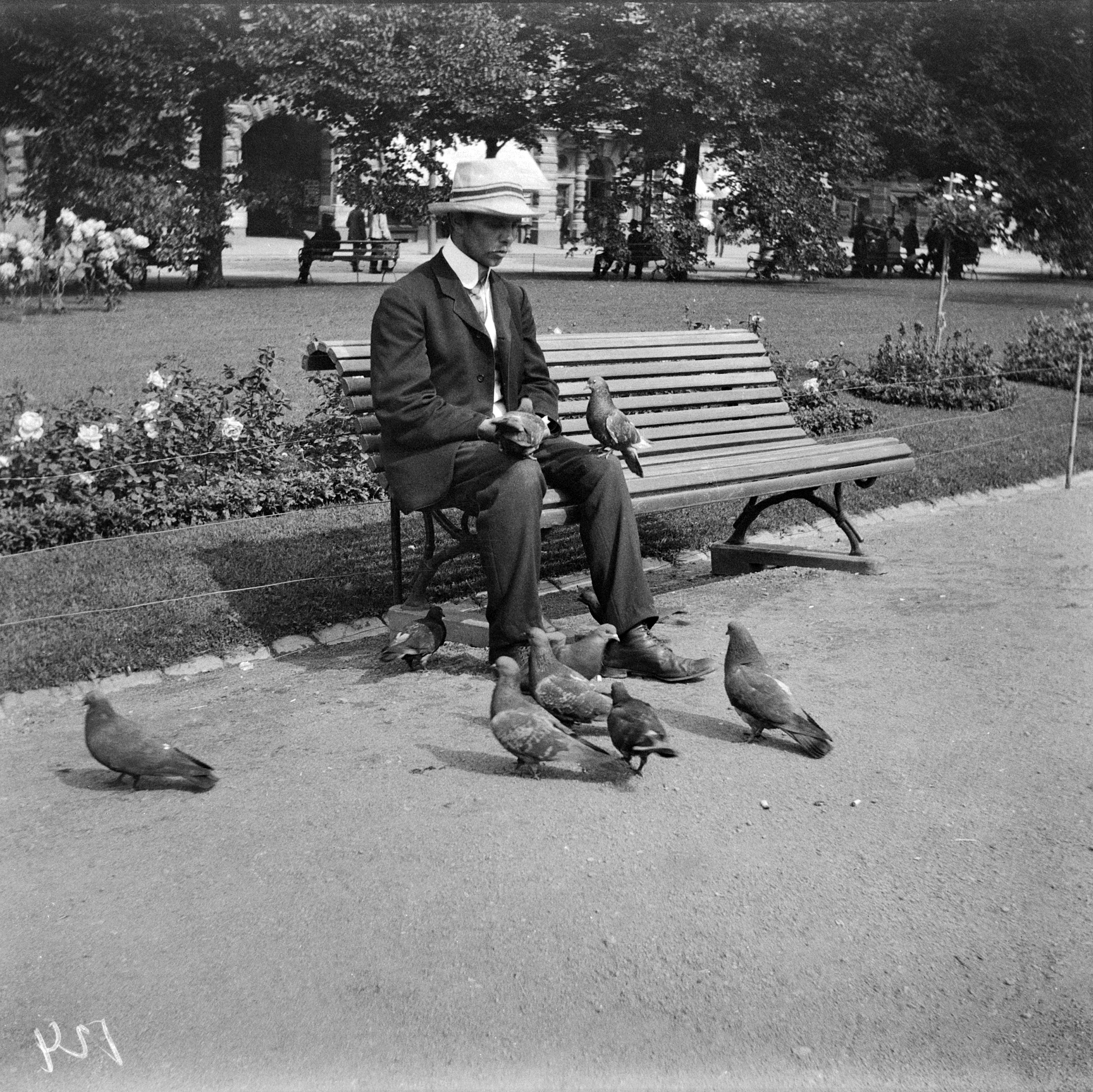
A man feeding pigeons at Esplanadi in Helsinki, Finland, in 1921

The British naturalist James Fisher wrote that the first person recorded as feeding wild birds was the 6th-century monk Saint Serf of Fife who tamed a robin by feeding it.

During the harsh winter of 1890–1891 in the United Kingdom national newspapers asked people to put out food for birds, and in 1910 in the United Kingdom, Punch magazine declared that feeding birds had become a national pastime.

Today in the United Kingdom, most people feed year-round, and enough food is provided to support the calorie requirements of the 10 most common garden bird species. Bird feeding has grown into the United States' second most popular hobby behind gardening. In celebration of the bird feeding hobby, February was named National Bird-Feeding Month by congressional decree in 1994.

== Types ==
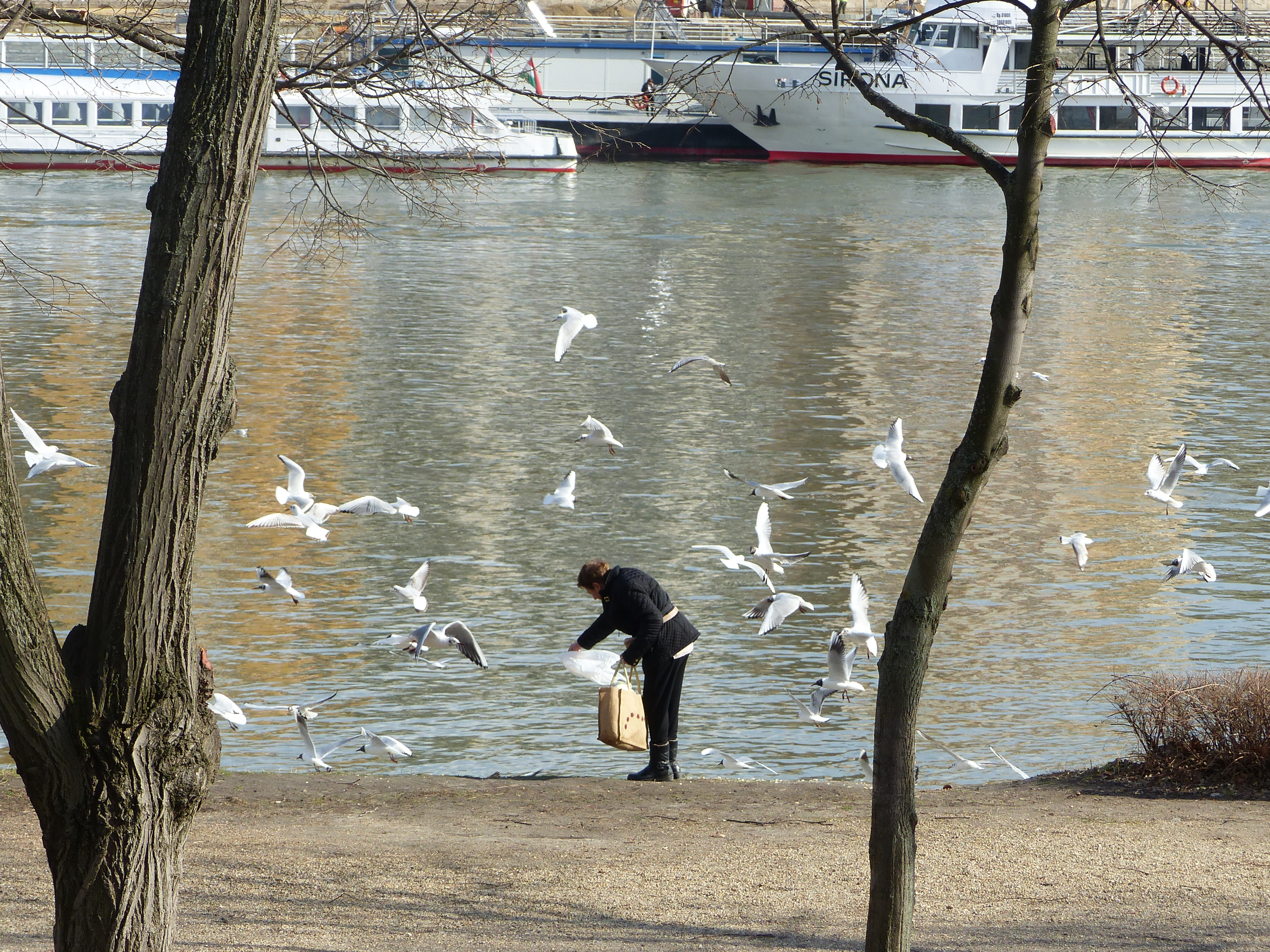
Seabird feeding

Certain foods tend to attract certain birds. Finches and siskin are attracted by niger (nyger or nyjer), and jays prefer maize. Hummingbirds, sunbirds and other nectivorous birds seek nectar.

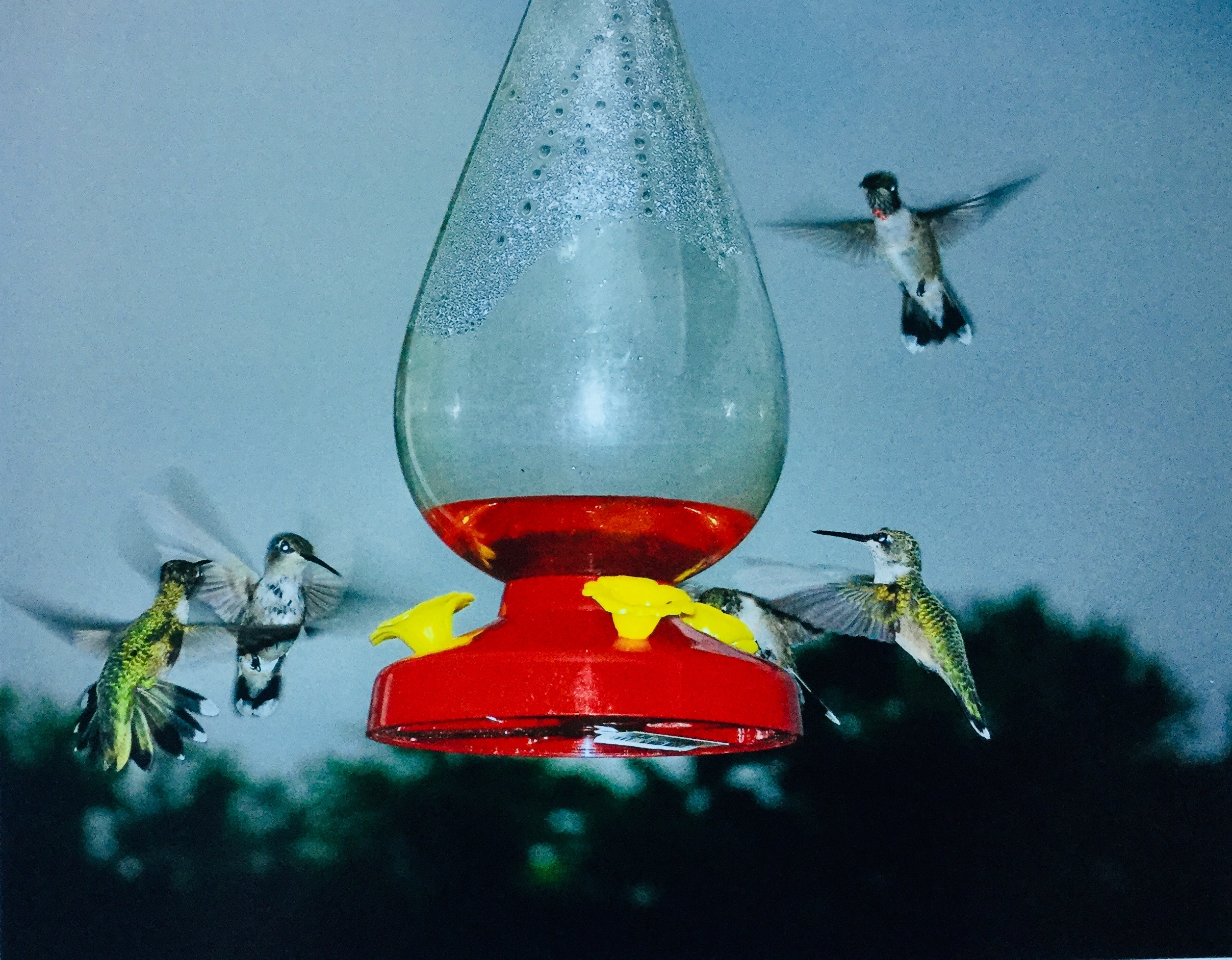
Hummingbirds encircling a feeder with nectar

Mixed seed and black-oil sunflower seed is favoured by many seed-eating species due to its high fat content and thin casing. In Australia, meat, especially raw beef mince (or ground beef), is commonly fed to wild carnivorous birds such as Australian magpies and kookaburras.

Birds such as white-eyes, barbets, and certain thrushes will consume fresh and cut fruit. Different feeders can be purchased specialized for different species. It is not only small birds that are attracted by bird feeding. In some urban areas of the UK, red kites are fed chicken and table scraps in gardens.

Most common birds can be fed using peanuts, seed, coconut (but never desiccated coconut) or fat (but not oils that are liquid at room temperature) using a variety of feeders.

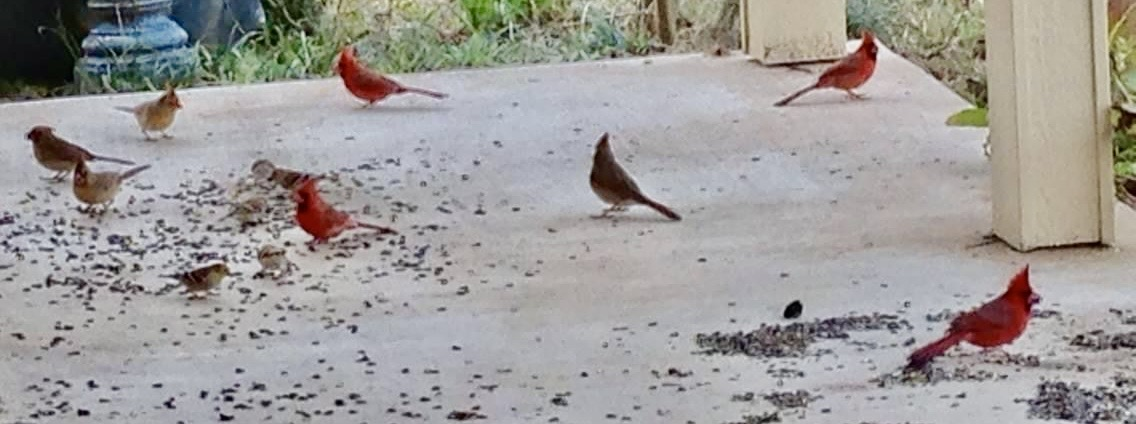
Feeding wild birds (cardinals) in rural Oklahoma.

After a station is established, it can take some weeks for birds to discover and start using it. This is particularly true if the feeding station is the first one in an area or (in cold-winter areas) if the station is being established in spring when natural sources of food are plentiful. Food, particularly unshelled foods, such as thistle seed and suet, left uneaten for too long may spoil. Birds also require a source of drinking water and a birdbath can attract birds to a feeding station.

In North America, suet can be used to attract a variety of birds that may not reliably visit a bird feeder containing seeds.

== Impact ==
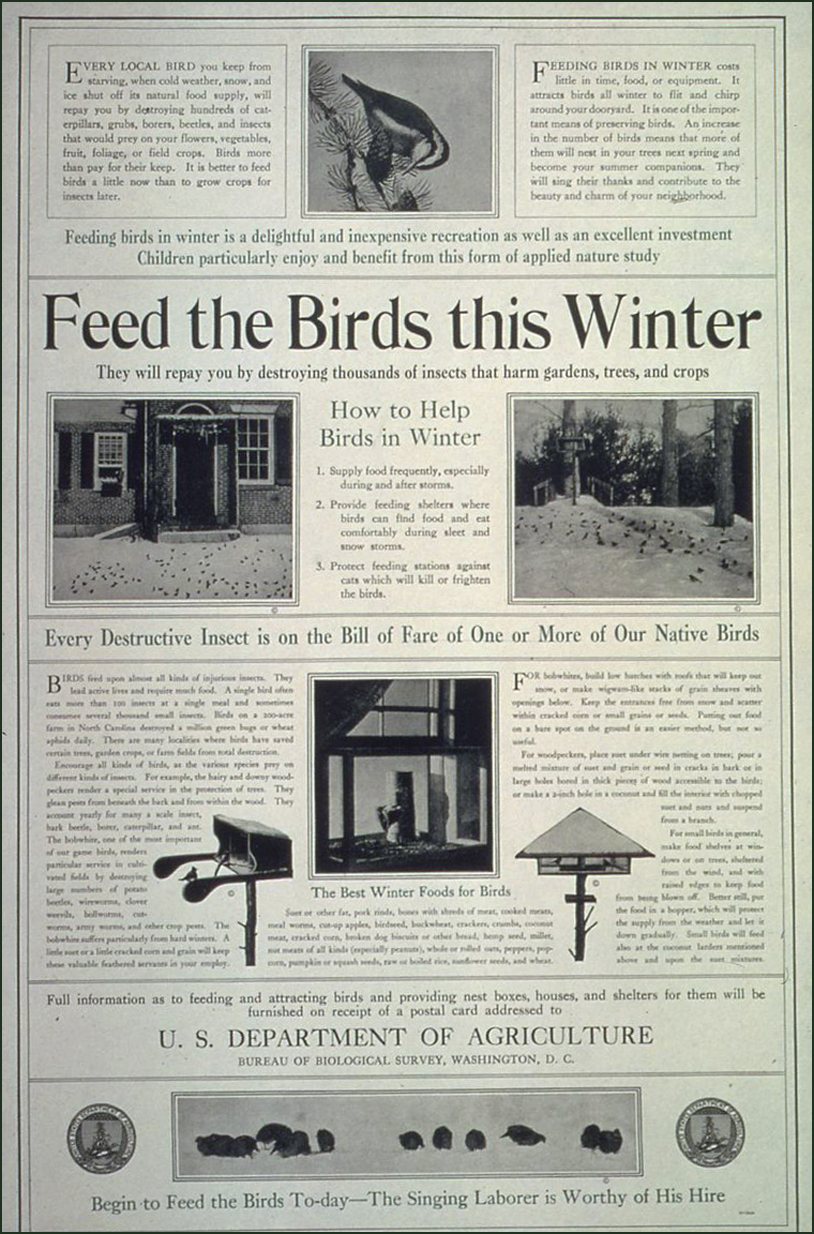
A 1918 call from the U.S. Department of Agriculture to feed birds in the winter.

A study conducted in Sheffield, England, found that the abundance of garden birds increased with levels of bird feeding. This effect was only apparent in those species that regularly take supplementary food, raising the possibility that bird feeding was having a direct effect on bird abundance. In contrast, the density of feeding stations had no effect on the species richness (number of different bird species present) in a neighbourhood.

The use of bird feeders has been claimed to cause environmental problems; some of these were highlighted in a front-page article in The Wall Street Journal.

Prior to the publication of The Wall Street Journal article, Canadian ornithologist Jason Rogers also wrote about the environmental problems associated with the use of bird feeders in the journal Alberta Naturalist. In this article, Rogers explains how the practice of feeding wild birds is inherently fraught with negative impacts and risks such as fostering dependency, altering natural distribution, density and migration patterns, interfering with ecological processes, causing malnutrition, facilitating the spread of disease and increasing the risk of death from cats, pesticides, hitting windows and other causes. In the UK, introduced eastern gray squirrels can consume significant volumes of food intended for birds. An experimental study providing supplementary food during the breeding season found that predation levels by corvids and eastern gray squirrels were higher when nests were located in close proximity to filled feeders.

In a paper in the journal Oecologia, it was reported that feeding of blue tits and great tits with peanut cake over a long time period significantly reduced brood size. This was driven by smaller clutch sizes in both species and lower hatching success rates for blue tits. Studies by the University of Freiburg and Environment Canada found that blackcaps migrating to Great Britain from Germany had become adapted to eating food supplied by humans. In contrast blackcaps migrating to Spain had bills adapted to feeding on fruit such as olives.

Providing supplementary food at feeding stations may also change interactions with other species. Aphids and carabid beetles are more likely to be predated by birds near bird feeders.

== Economy ==
Large sums of money are spent by ardent bird feeders, who indulge their wild birds with a variety of bird foods and bird feeders. Over 55 million Americans over the age of 16 feed wild birds and spend more than $3 billion a year on bird food, and $800 million a year on bird feeders, bird baths, bird houses and other bird feeding accessories. The activity has spawned an industry that sells supplies and equipment for the bird feeding hobby.

In some cities or parts of cities (e.g. Trafalgar Square in London) pigeons are activity discouraged by government, either because they compete with vulnerable native species, or because they abound and cause pollution and/or noise.

== See also ==
- Bird food plants – certain trees, shrubs and herbaceous plants bearing fruits which afford food for birds
- Do not feed the animals – a policy forbidding the artificial feeding of wildlife, commonly signposted in places where people come into contact with wildlife
- National Bird-Feeding Society (NBFS) – an organization in the United States whose mission is to make the hobby of bird feeding better, both for people who feed wild birds and for the birds themselves
- Nectar source – a flowering plant that produces nectar, sometimes attracting birds such as hummingbirds
- Suet cake – or "fat balls" are nutritional supplements for wild birds, commonly consisting of sunflower seeds and wheat or oat flakes mixed with suet

== Gallery ==
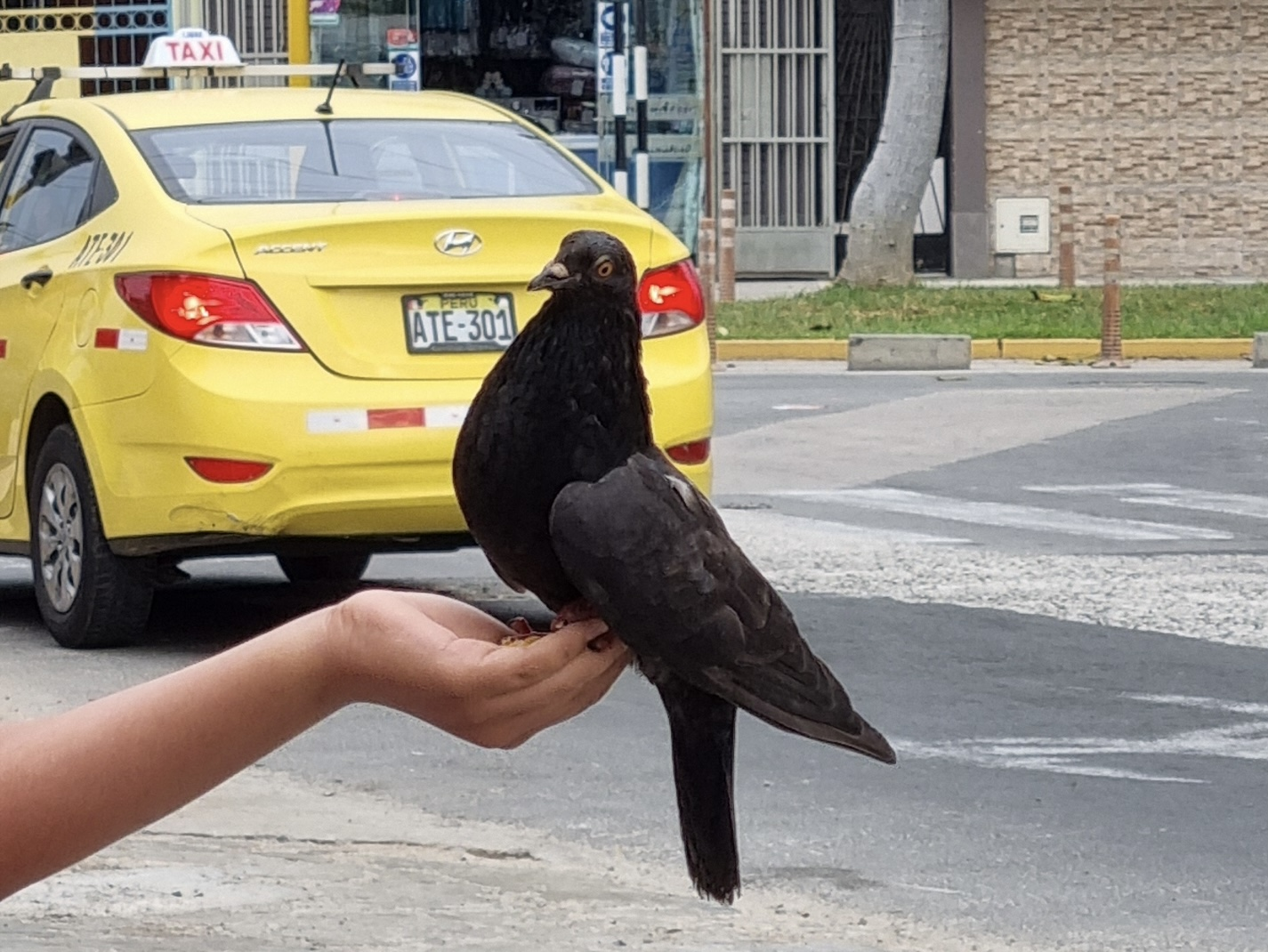
Feral Rock Dove feeding in a hand

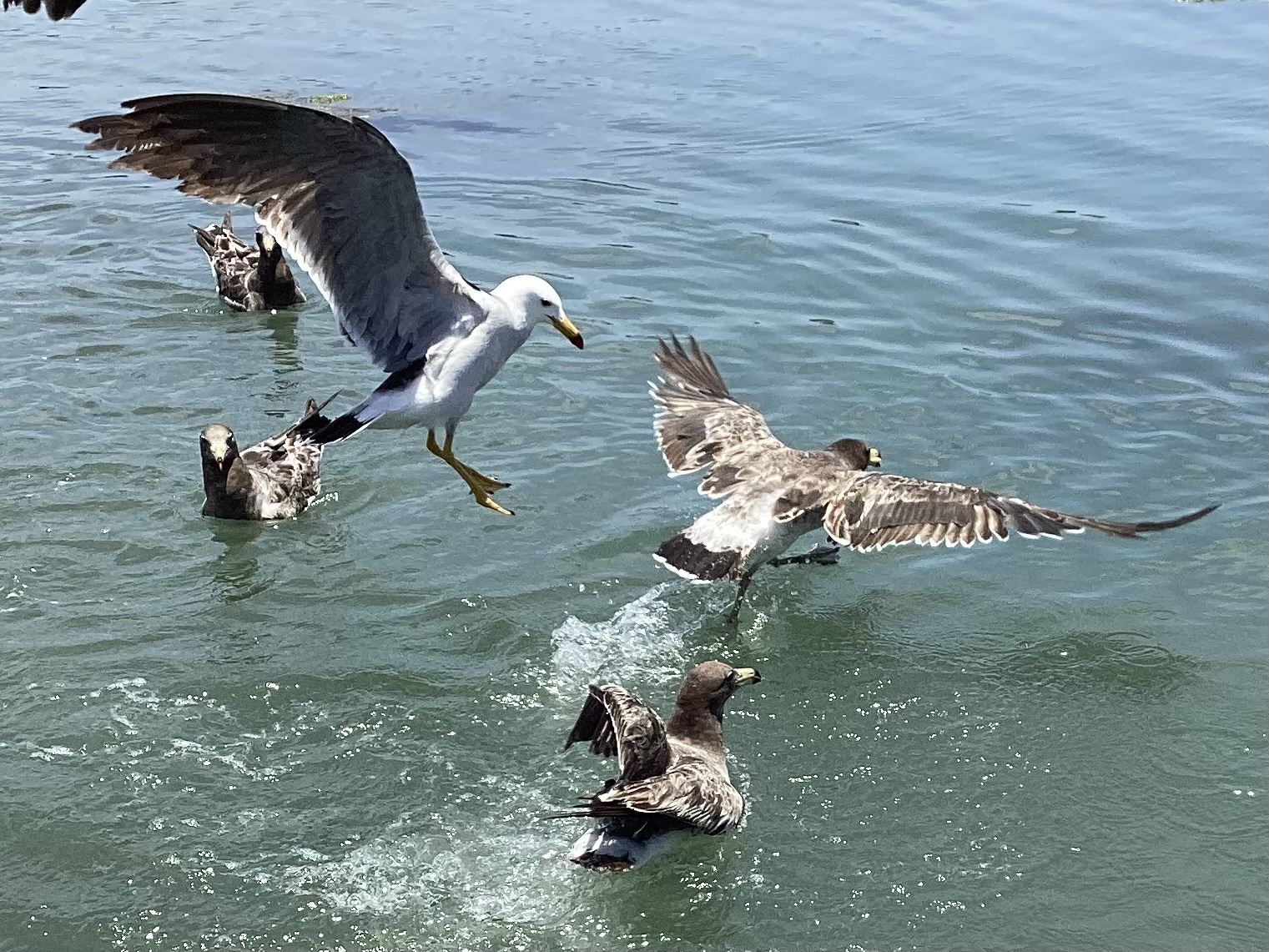
Belcher's gulls feeding off of saltine crackers
