= Angel Wings (California) =

Mountain in the state of California

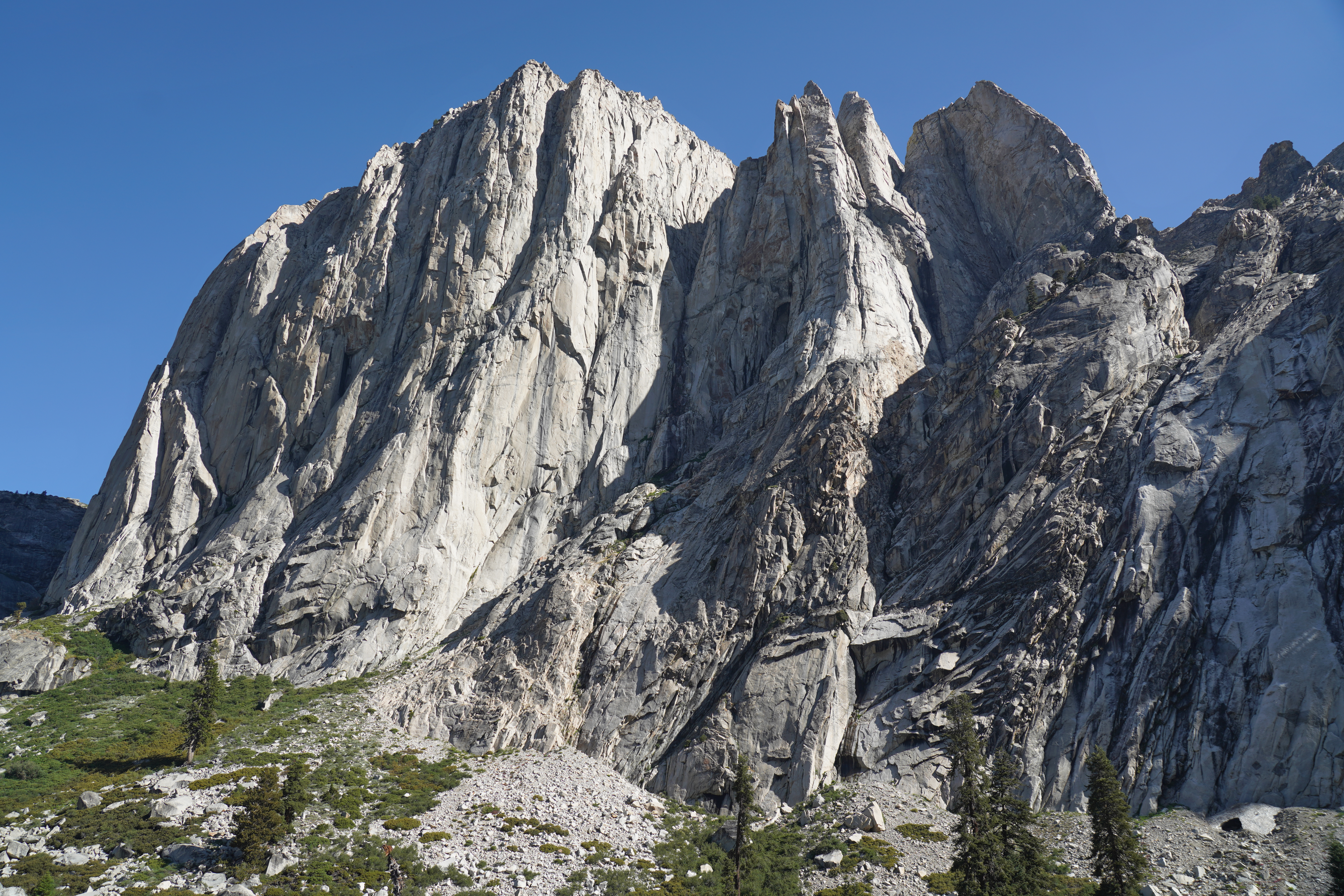
- South aspect from Valhalla

Highest point
- Elevation: 10,401 ft (3,170 m)
- Prominence: 411 ft (125 m)
- Parent peak: Mount Stewart
- Isolation: 1.86 mi (2.99 km)
- Coordinates: 36°34′23″N 118°34′58″W

Geography
- Location within California Location within the United States
- Country: United States
- State: California
- County: Tulare
- Protected area: Sequoia National Park
- Parent range: Sierra Nevada
- Topo map: USGS Triple Divide Peak

Geology
- Rock age: Cretaceous
- Rock type: Granite

Climbing
- First ascent: July 1967
- Easiest route: class 4

Angel Wings is a mountain in California, United States.

== Description ==
Angel Wings is a 10,401-foot-elevation (3,170-meter) summit located in the Sierra Nevada mountain range in Tulare County of California. It is situated above Hamilton Lakes along the west side of the Great Western Divide in Sequoia National Park. Topographic relief is significant as the summit rises approximately 2,400 feet (732 meters) above Hamilton Lakes in one-half mile (0.80 km). Precipitation runoff from this mountain drains into tributaries of the Middle Fork of the Kaweah River. Angel Wings' south face is the largest rock wall in Sequoia National Park, and was one of Fred Beckey's favorite climbs in North America. This landform's toponym has not been officially adopted by the U.S. Board on Geographic Names.

== Climbing ==
Rock-climbing routes with first ascents:

- South Face - Allen Steck, Dick Long, Les Wilson, Jim Wilson - (1967)
- South Arête - class 5.9 - Chris Jones, Galen Rowell - (1971)
- Wings Over the Sierra - class 5.9 - Fred Beckey, Bill Lahr, Alan Neifeld, Craig Martinson - (1977)
- Hell on Wings - class 5.10 - Richard Leversee, Kim Grandfield, Edwin C. Joe - (1989)
- South Arête Direct - class 5.12 - Dave Nettle, Jim Nowak - (1991)
- Just a Rock in the Park - class 5.10 - Edwin C. Joe, Richard Leversee, Ron Felton - (1996)
- Valkyrie - class 5.11 - Dave Nettle, Peter Croft, Greg Epperson, Brandon Thau - (2012)
- Val Kilmer - class 5.11 - Jonathan Schaffer, Timothy Gibson - (2013)

== Climate ==
According to the Köppen climate classification system, Angel Wings is located in an alpine climate zone. Weather fronts originating in the Pacific Ocean travel east toward the Sierra Nevada mountains. As fronts approach, they are forced upward by the peaks (orographic lift), causing them to drop their moisture in the form of rain or snowfall onto the range.

== Gallery ==
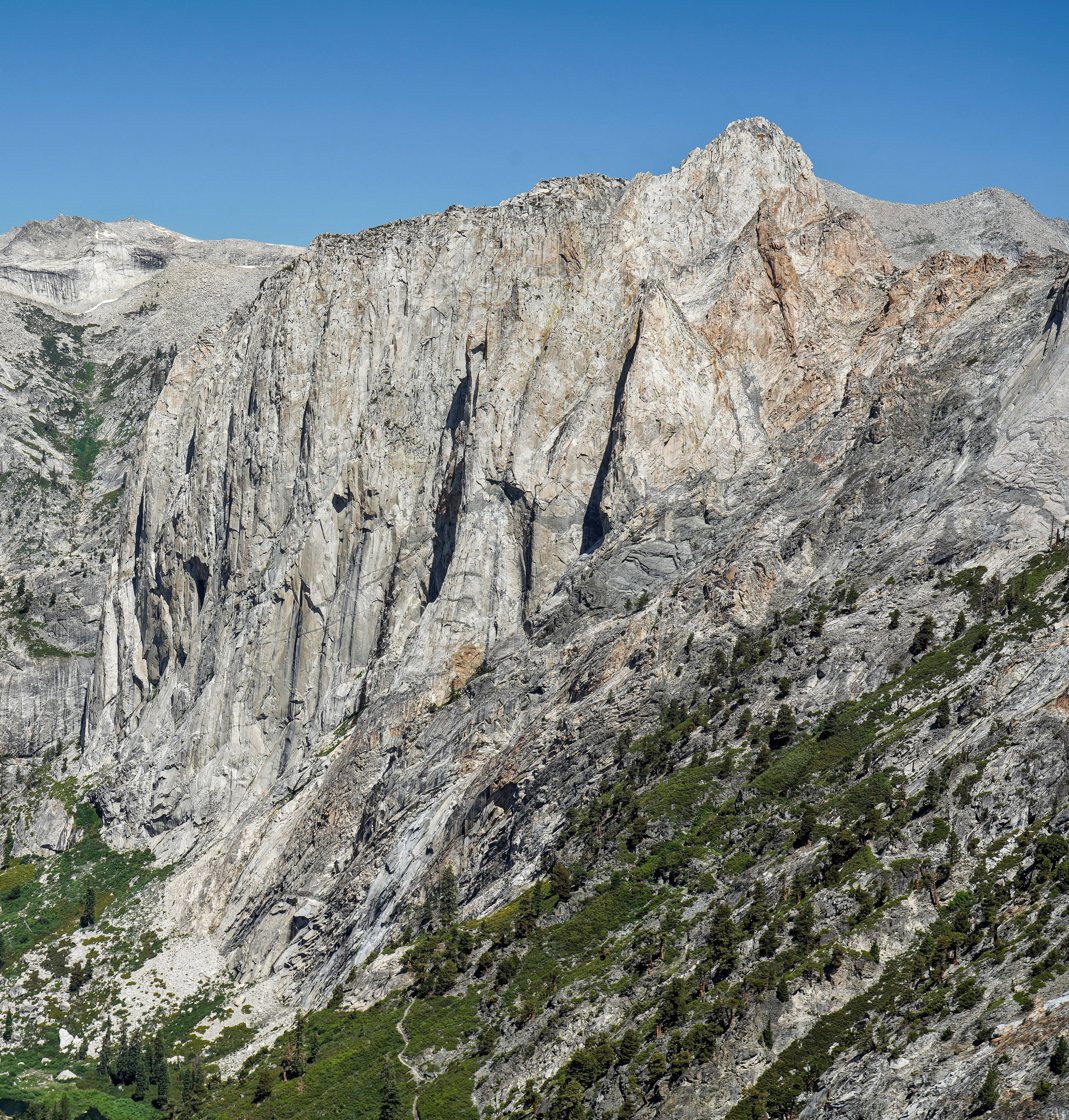
Southeast aspect

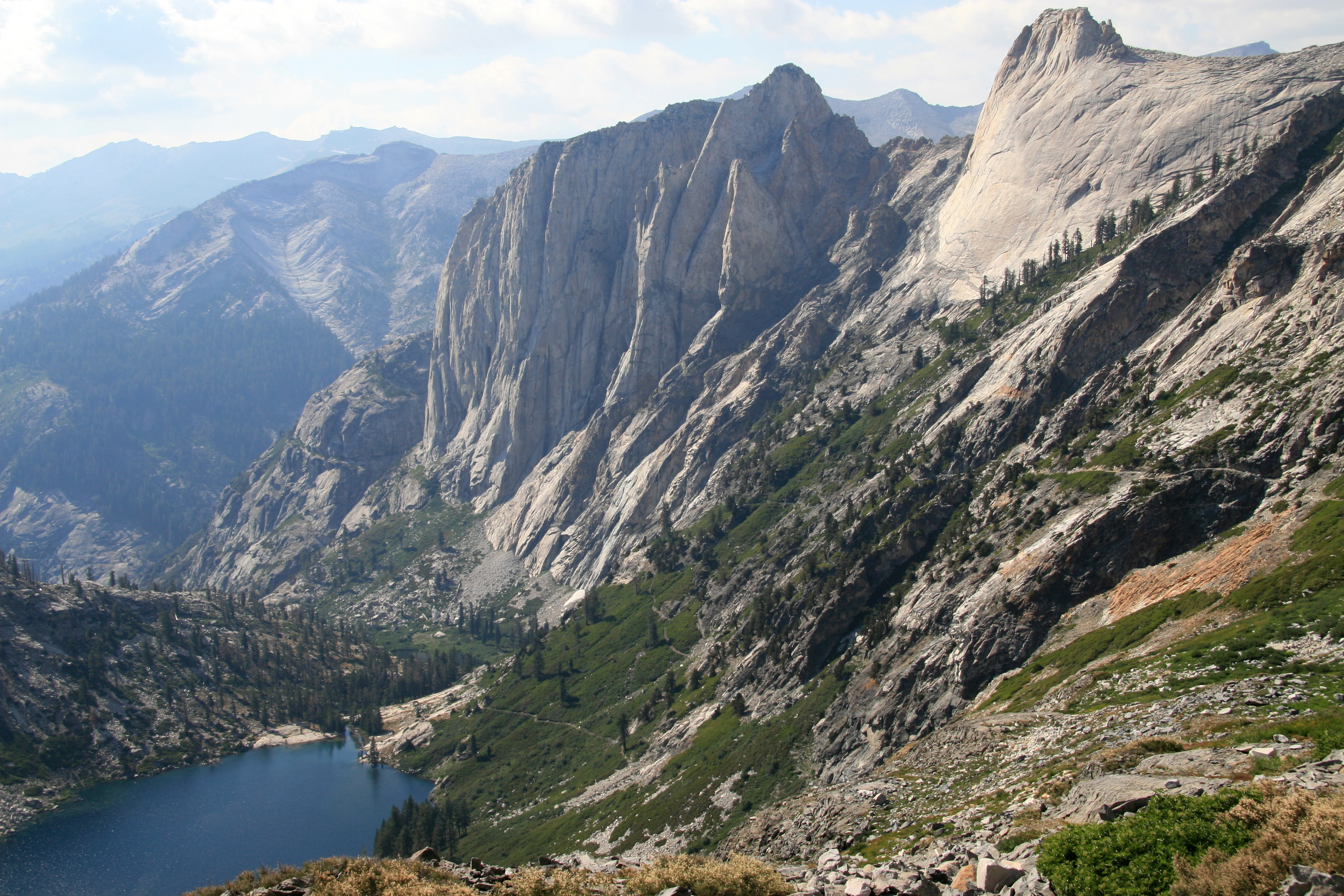
Angel Wings (center), Cherubim Dome (upper right), and Hamilton Lakes

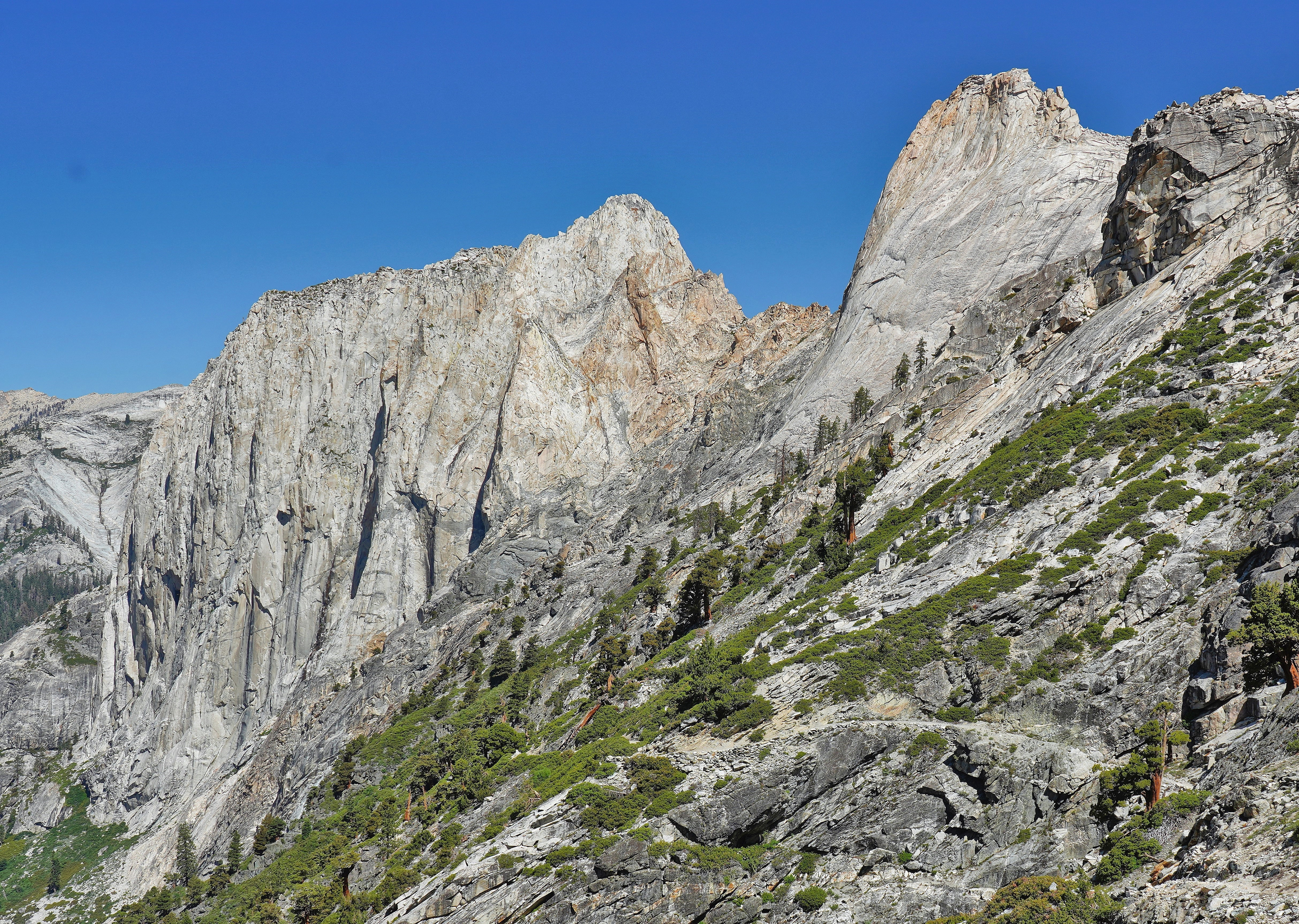
Angel Wings and Cherubim Dome

== See also ==
- List of mountain peaks of California
- Big wall climbing
