= Bird feeder =

Device to supply food to birds

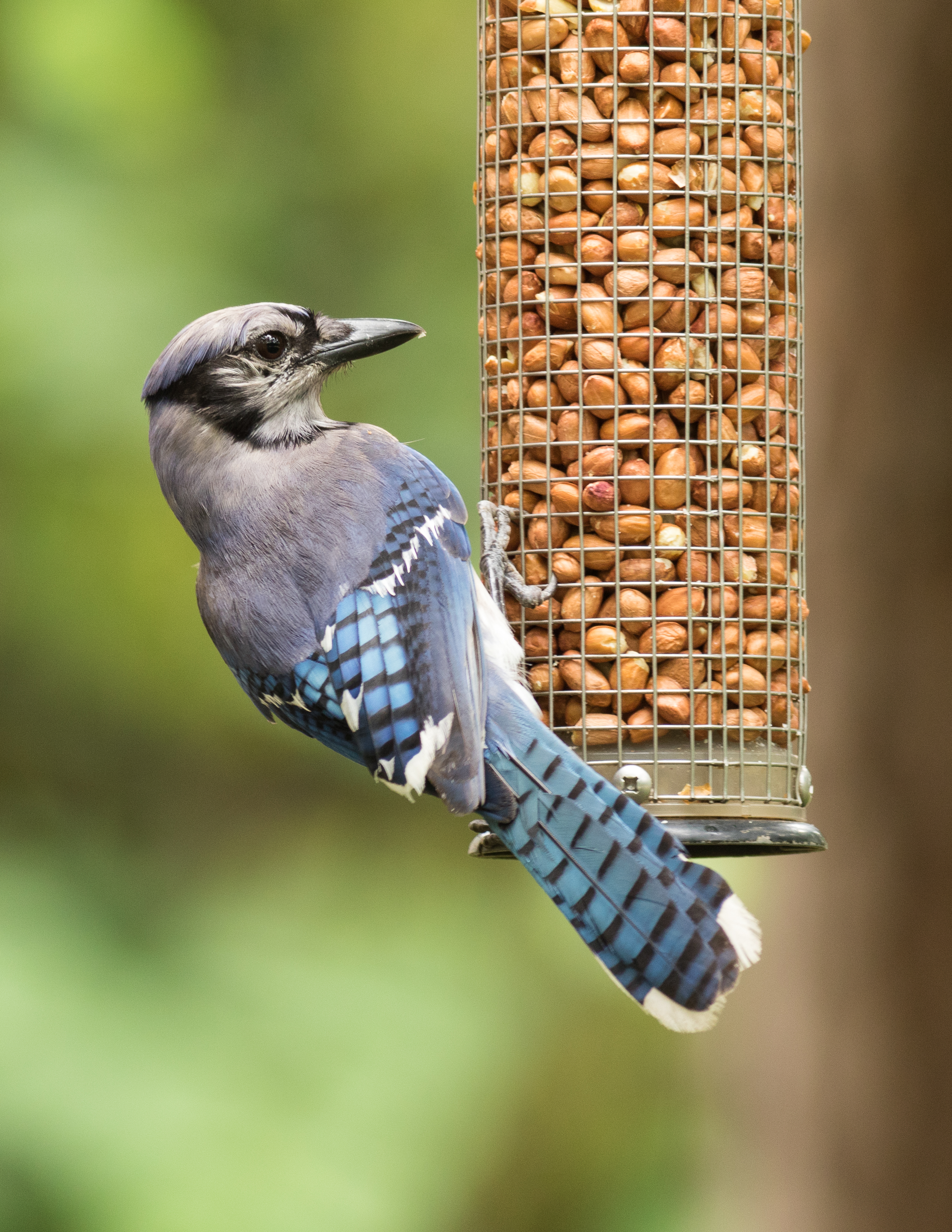
Blue jay eating at a feeder

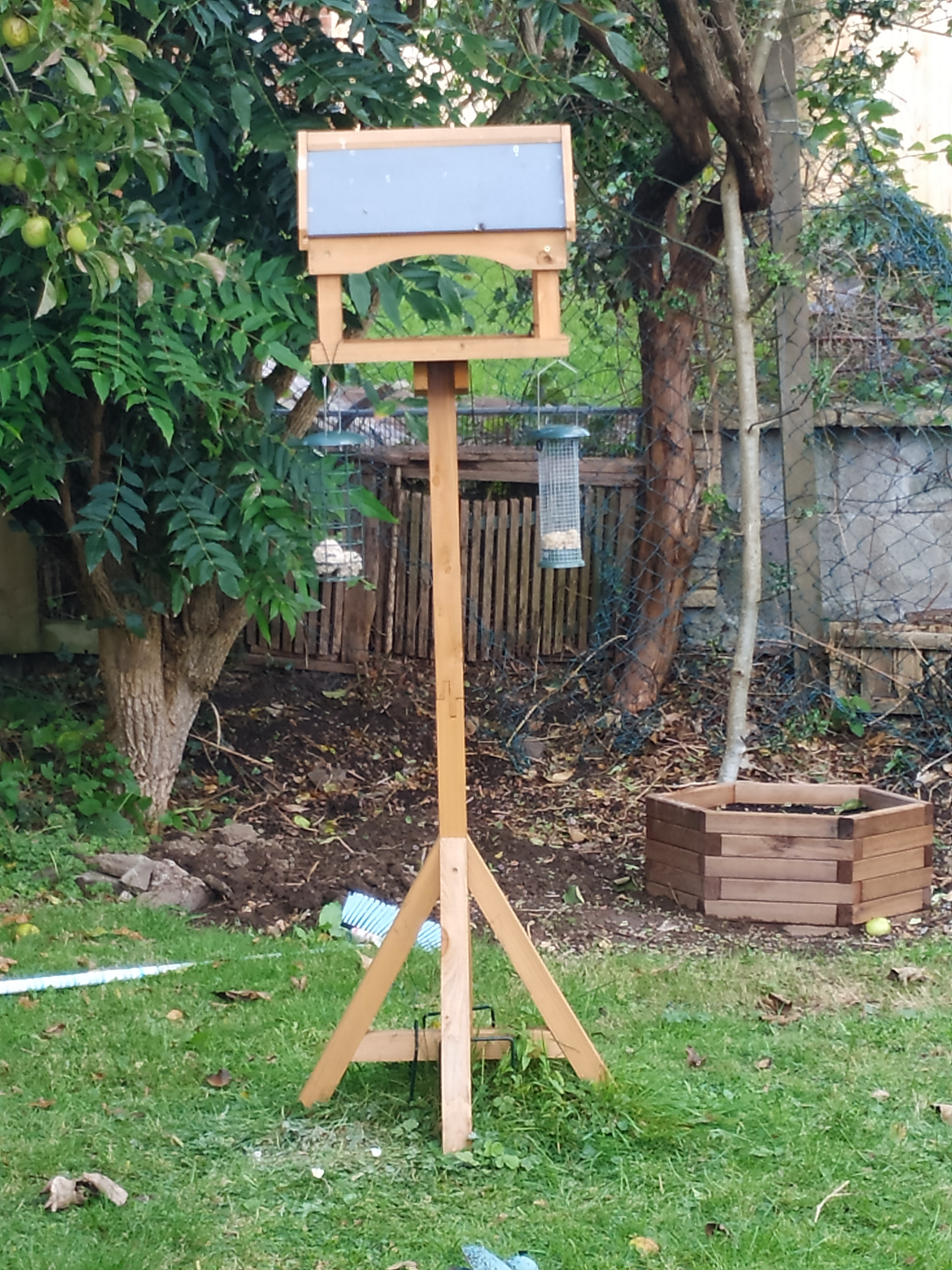
Bird feeder in a garden

A birdfeeder, bird table, or tray feeder is a device placed outdoors to supply bird food to birds (bird feeding). The success of a bird feeder in attracting birds depends upon its placement and the kinds of foods offered, as different species have different preferences.

Most bird feeders supply seeds or bird food, such as millet, sunflower (oil and striped), safflower, nyjer seed, and rapeseed or canola seed to seed-eating birds.

Bird feeders often are used for birdwatching and many people keep webcams trained on feeders where birds often congregate, with some even living just near the bird feeder.

== Types of feeders ==
=== Seed feeders ===
A blue tit eating peanuts from a garden feeder

Seed feeders are the most common type of feeders. They can vary in design from tubes to hoppers and trays. Sunflower seeds or mixed seeds are popular for use in these feeders and will attract many songbirds such as cardinals, finches, and chickadees. Black oil sunflower seeds are especially popular with bird enthusiasts. The outer shell of the black oil sunflower seeds is thinner and easier to crack than other types of sunflower seeds. In addition, the kernel is larger than the striped or white sunflower seeds. Black oil sunflower seeds also contain a large amount of fat; therefore they are especially good to use in the winter. Most bird feeders are designed to dispense sunflower-sized foods, but there are specialty "finch feeders" with smaller openings to dispense the tiny Guizotia abyssinica (Niger seed), which is a favorite of smaller finches.

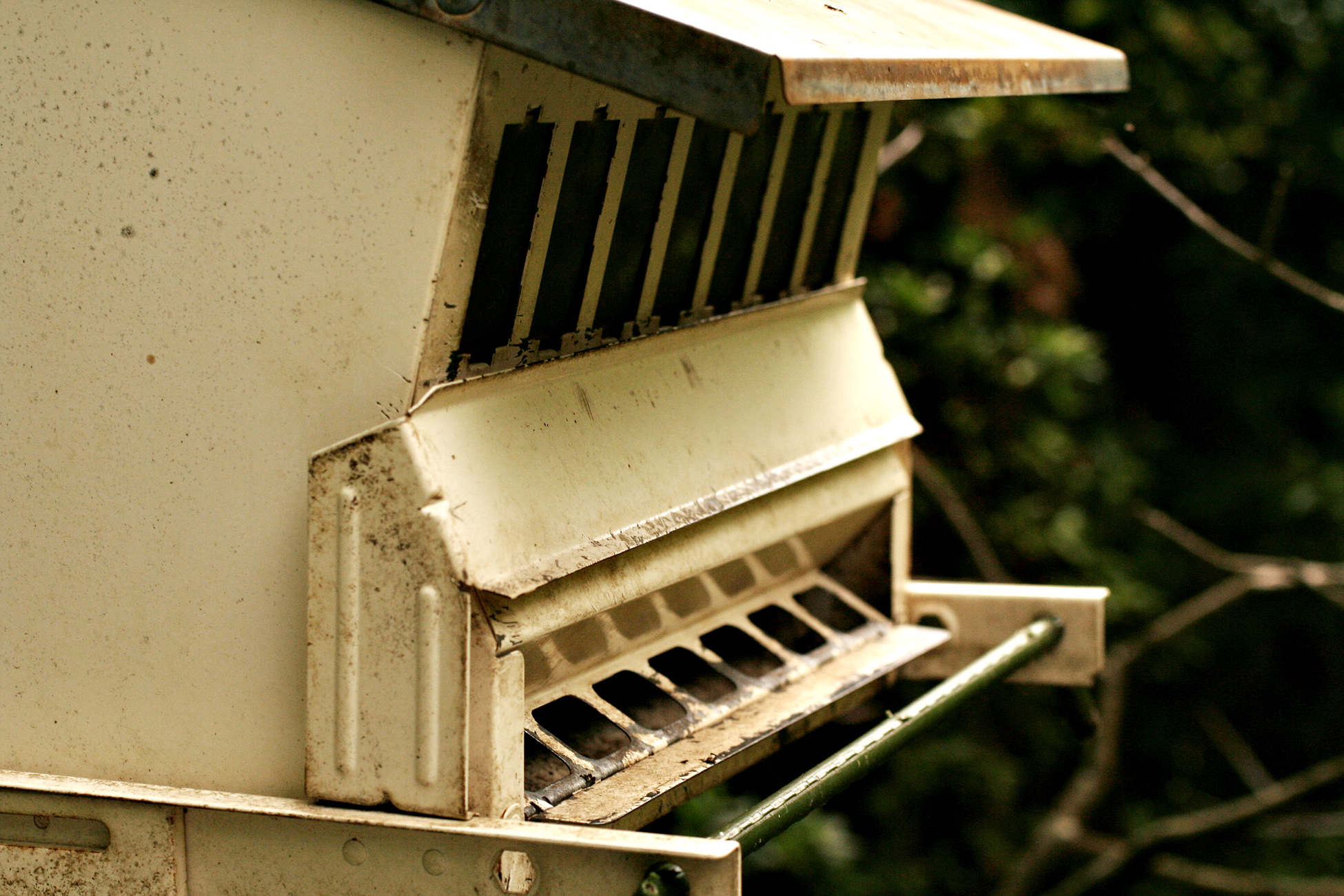
An empty bird-seed dispenser

Seed feeders are mainly squirrel proof, tube-like or hopper. Due to the need of keeping squirrels away from the bird food, manufacturers have created different defense mechanisms that may deter squirrels from getting close to the seed. Some seed feeders come with weight sensitive technology which shuts off the access to the seed ports whenever a heavy weight is detected (as most squirrels are heavier than birds). Birds can still feed as they weigh less and the ports remain open under their weight. Other seed feeders are designed to be mounted on poles as it is believed that squirrels reach seed feeders more easily from trees than from poles. The simplest type of squirrel proof feeder is a tube-like feeder surrounded by a metal cage. These feeders also offer protection from larger and more aggressive birds. Tube seed feeders are primarily made of clear plastic tubes with plastic or metal caps, bases and perches. Hopper bird feeders look like a house and attract a wide range of birds such as finches, cardinals, blue jays, sparrows and titmice.

=== Hummingbird feeders ===
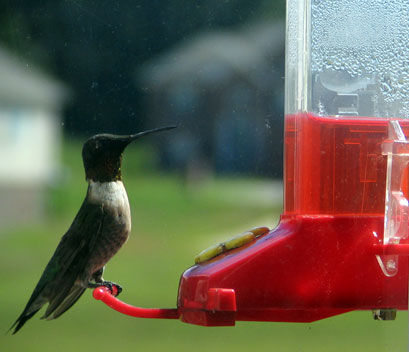
A hummingbird feeder with red nectar

Hummingbird feeders supply liquid nourishment to hummingbirds in the form of a sugar solution. The solution is normally 4 parts water to 1 part white sugar. Only pure refined white cane or beet sugar should be used:

- Brown, turbinado, or raw sugar must not be used because they contain levels of iron that could be lethal.
- Honey must not be used, because it promotes dangerous fungal growth.
- No using food dyes as it's harmful to them.
- The nectar should be changed every 3–5 days.
- A common myth that leaving the feeder out past September prevents them from migrating south is not not true.

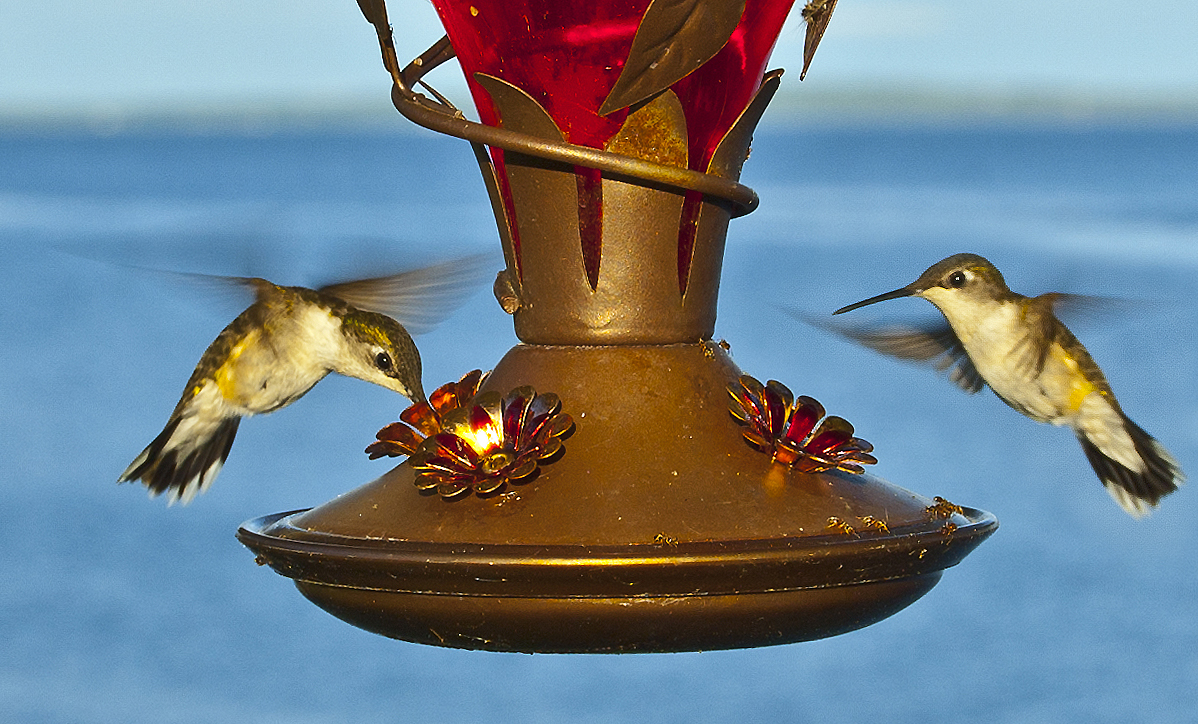
Two hummingbirds hovering by a feeder

Hummingbird feeders usually have red accents or red glass to help attract hummingbirds. The sugar mixture is sometimes colored with red food coloring to attract birds, though this is not necessary if the feeder itself is red, and may actually be harmful to the birds. Yeasts tend to grow in hummingbird feeders and spoil the solution, so they must be refreshed frequently and kept very clean to avoid harm to the birds. See the article on hummingbirds for more details. Ants and other insects are also attracted to hummingbird nectar. Smearing petroleum jelly on the stem or cap of the feeder (away from the perch or flower part where the bird may come into contact with it) may prevent the ants from crawling to the feeder. It is best to place a hummingbird feeder 15-20 feet from windows and 10-15 feet from the nearest cover, like shrubs or bushes; and in an open area that receives partial sun.

Hummingbird top-fill feeders are popular among bird lovers because they are easy to fill and clean and also because they do not need to be turned upright which means that there are less chances that the nectar is spilled. The sports bottle top-fill hummingbird feeders have the design of a sports bottle, with a mechanism that works similarly to such a bottle. With this type of feeder, one has to push down the plastic container in order to close the nectar reservoir and then to unscrew the cap and pour the nectar. After the cap is replaced, the body of the nectar reservoir can be pulled up. This type of bird feeder has the advantage that the feeder does not need to be turned upside down to be refilled and which results in less nectar wasted by spilling. The traditional top-fill hummingbird feeders are one of the most popular types. There is also a plunger type of top-filling hummingbird feeder which comes with a small plunger in the container that creates the vacuum seal when the lid is tightened and the nectar will start flowing only when the lid is sealed correctly to the feeding ports.

There are several variations of bottom-fill hummingbird feeders. The traditional ones are filled from an opening at the bottom of the nectar container but many manufacturers have come up with improved variations to make feeding birds easier and with less nectar wasted. Some bottom-fill feeders come with a funnel-like opening at the bottom of the container, through which the feeder is filled. Other bottom-filled hummingbird feeders can be attached to one's window to provide a close-up of the birds.

==== History of hummingbird feeders ====
Precursors to hummingbird feeders date at least to 1821, when John James Audubon reported the intentional feeding of "sweetened wine" to hummingbirds on Oakley Plantation in Louisiana. In 1899, Clark University professor Clifton F. Hodge wrote in Bird-Lore magazine about feeding a hummingbird that had flown into his classroom by adding drops of honey to flowers. The following year, Carolyn B. Soule successfully fed hummingbirds with an experiment involving a colored paper trumpetflower, a small glass bottle, and sugar water. Research conducted by self-taught ornithologist Althea Sherman from 1907 to 1913 revealed that hummingbirds preferred to drink sugar water from plain bottles instead of imitation flowers. Between 1927 and 1929, Benjamin Tucker and Dorothy May fed hummingbirds with cocktail glasses covered with tin or wood hole-containing tops.

Tucker subsequently developed early automatic hummingbird feeders, which were partially adapted from drinking apparatuses used for farm-raised chickens and featured spherical containers at the top with narrow necks leading down to a perching area that could feed eight hummingbirds simultaneously. Also during the 1920s, Margaret L. Bodine successfully experimented with feeding hummingbirds using two-inch-long bottles made of brightly colored materials and filled with sugar water that she left among clematis flowers. Inspired at least partially by Bodine's work, Edith Webster similarly experimented with feeders and herself tasted nectar from various flowers to better replicate the sweetness level preferred by hummingbirds for her sugar water solution, arriving at two parts water to one part sugar as the optimal ratio. Webster's husband, Lawrence, created cylindrical hummingbird feeders made of clear glass with two red-colored glass feeding ports at the base, and while none were sold, he made dozens for the Websters' garden.

Hummingbird feeders began appearing for sale in the early 1930s. In 1932, W. R. Sullivan invented a feeder designed to prevent other birds or insects from drinking from it, which he produced and sold locally around Kerrville, Texas. Most of the early commercial hummingbird feeders used bottles or vials full of sugar water that was dispensed via various imitation flower designs, as had their noncommercial antecedents. Prominent examples of hummingbird feeders sold between the 1930s and 1950s were those designed and built by H. R. Davis, Robert Morgan, Winthrop Packard, and the Tucker Sanctuary.

Since the start of commercialization, hummingbird feeders have largely evolved into designs of two distinct types: "vacuums", which are inverted cylinders with feeding ports at the bottom, and "saucers", which resemble two bowls or dishes fixed together in a top-to-bottom orientation, with feeding ports on the top side. Droll Yankees marketed one of the first prominent saucer-type feeders, the LF ("Little Feeder"), while numerous small companies sold vacuum-type feeders into the 1970s.

=== Oriole feeders ===
Oriole feeders, which are traditionally colored orange, also supply such artificial nectar and are designed to serve New World orioles, which have an unusually shaped beak and tongue. These orioles and some other birds also will come to fruit foods, such as grape jelly, or half an orange on a peg. Hummingbirds will also feed from Oriole feeders.

Oriole feeders usually have nectar containers made of glass or plastic, which are designed to attract the orioles. Oriole feeders should be cleaned at least once a week and even more often when the temperatures are higher. Oriole feeders also come in top fill, bottom fill and dish-like designs.

=== Suet feeders ===
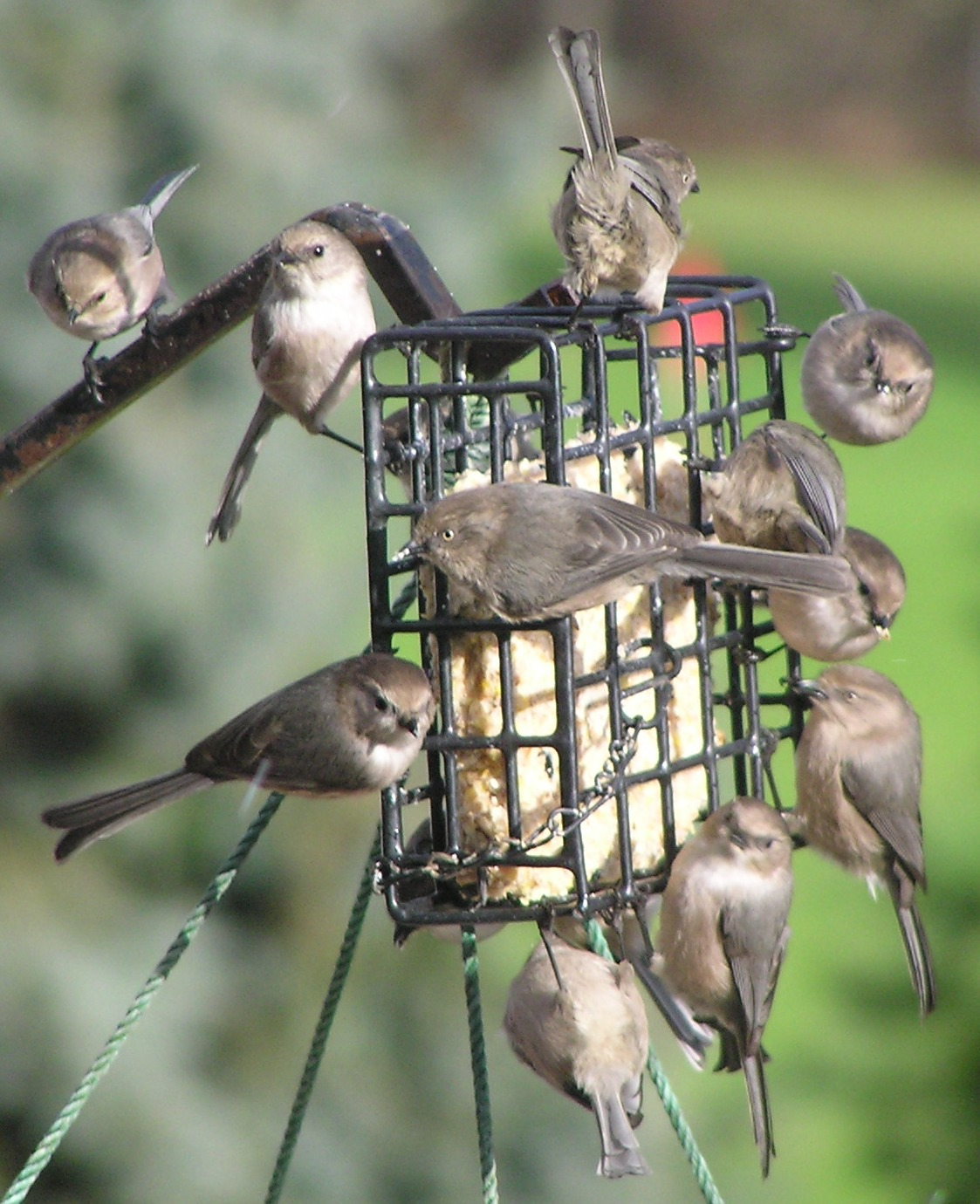
Bushtits on a suet feeder

A suet feeder is typically a metal cage-like construction with a plastic coating that contains a cake or block of suet to feed woodpeckers, flickers, nuthatches, and many other species of insect eaters. Suet logs are also very common. These wooden logs have holes drilled out for suet to be inserted. Suet is high in fat which helps to keep birds warm and nourished during the cold winter. Suet cakes consist of sunflower seeds and wheat or oat flakes mixed with suet, pork fat, or coconut oil.

=== Other ===
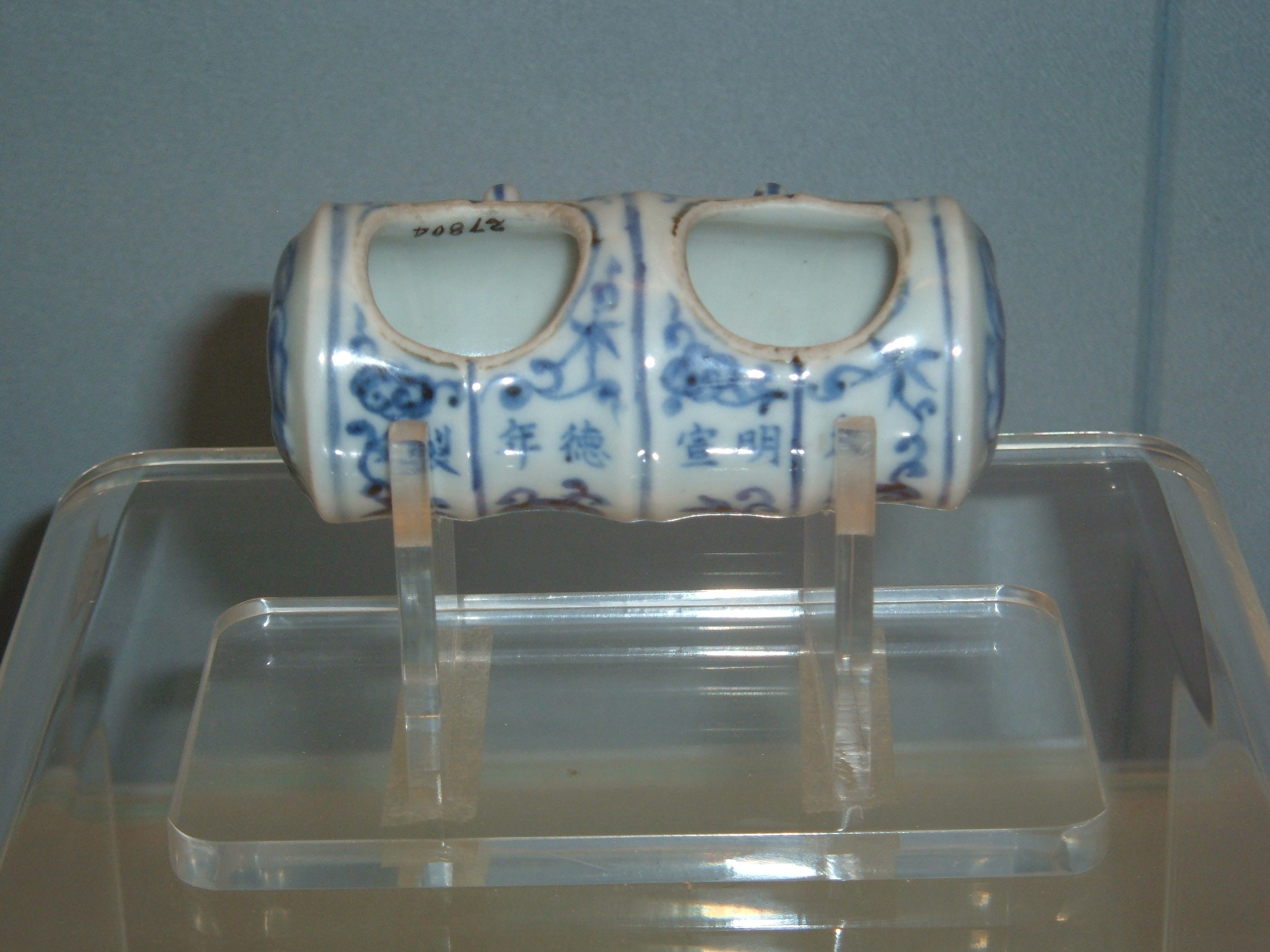
Chinese blue-and-white porcelain bird feeder from the reign of the Xuande Emperor (1425–1435)

Birds housed in wired or glass cages can be fed with electronic bird feeders. The electronic bird feeders are capable of storing bird food for days and even weeks, depending on the feeder type and automatically replenish the dish once it is empty.

Providing a varied array of tastes and feeding venues will result in less competition for food and dining spots for birds, just as well-planned and maintained gardens provide many plants which supply different types of seeds and nectars. A shallow bird bath can attract as many birds as a feeder but it must be safe from cats, kept clean, and refreshed frequently with clean water to avoid mosquitoes. The birdbath should be placed where a frightened bird can fly up easily to an overhanging limb or resting place if disturbed or attacked.

== Squirrels ==
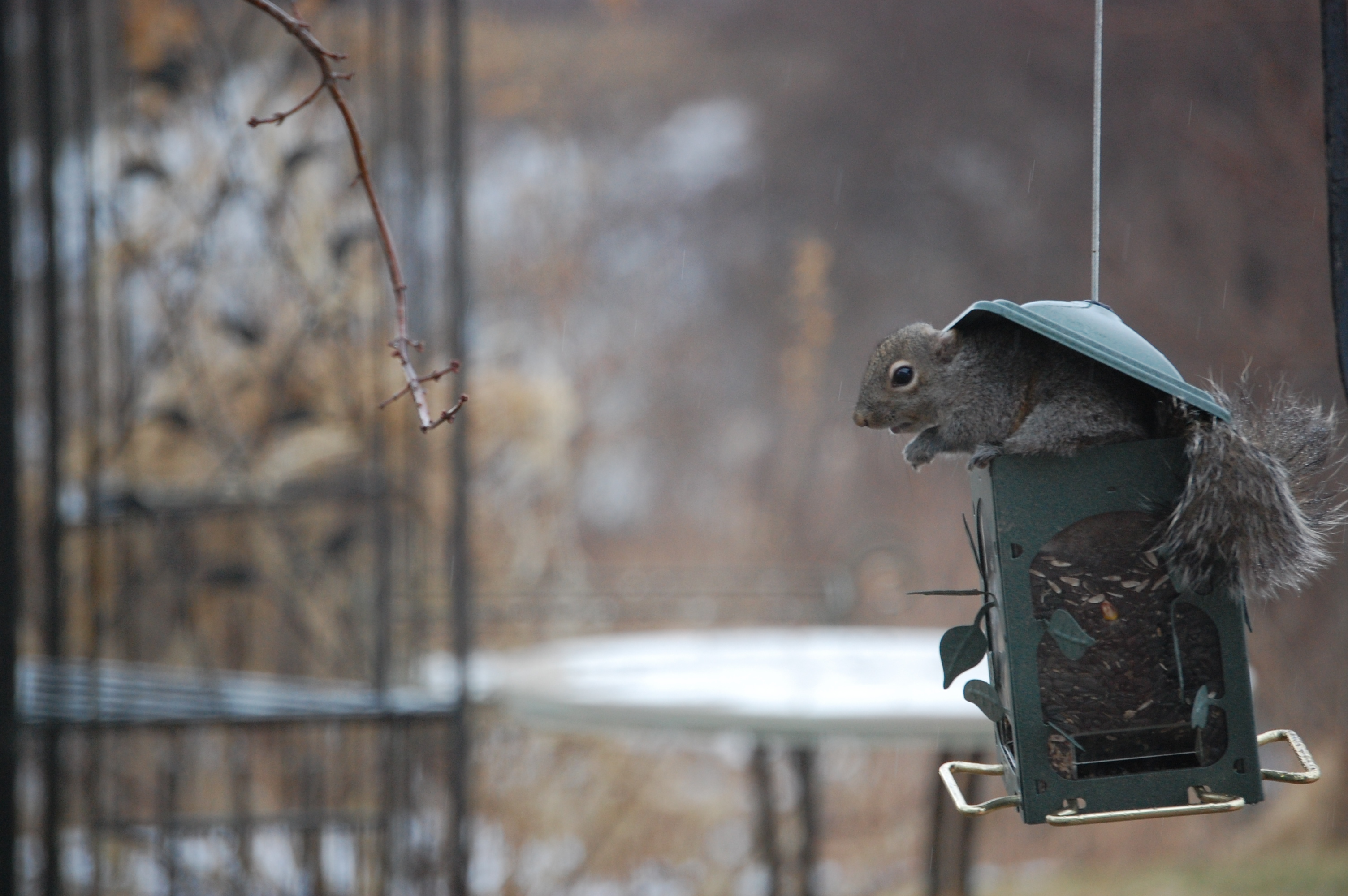
Squirrel eating from bird feeder

Squirrels may also help themselves to the contents of bird feeders, often not merely feeding, but carrying away the food to their hoard. There are various anti-squirrel techniques and devices available to thwart attempts by squirrels to raid bird feeders. Several manufacturers produce feeders with perches that collapse under the weight of anything heavier than a bird, or that use battery power to shock an intruder lightly or spin the perching area to fling it off. Caged feeders are often designed so that squirrels cannot reach the seed inside, but birds can easily fly through the cage's holes. A UK company, The Nuttery, held the original patent on this cage-within-a-cage design. Caged feeders are best to keep out gray squirrels. Chipmunks and red squirrels can usually enter caged feeders. Hot pepper in bird seed and suet has also been shown to be effective against squirrels without harming birds, as birds are not sensitive to capsaicin oleoresin, but mammals experience a strong burning sensation when exposed to it.

The placement of a bird feeder can also prevent squirrels from accessing the seed. In addition, baffles can be used that prevent squirrels from gaining their footing above feeders. Below feeders, baffles can prevent squirrels from climbing any further; however, squirrels are very agile and acrobatic and often find a way to overcome devices of any nature.

== Negative impacts ==
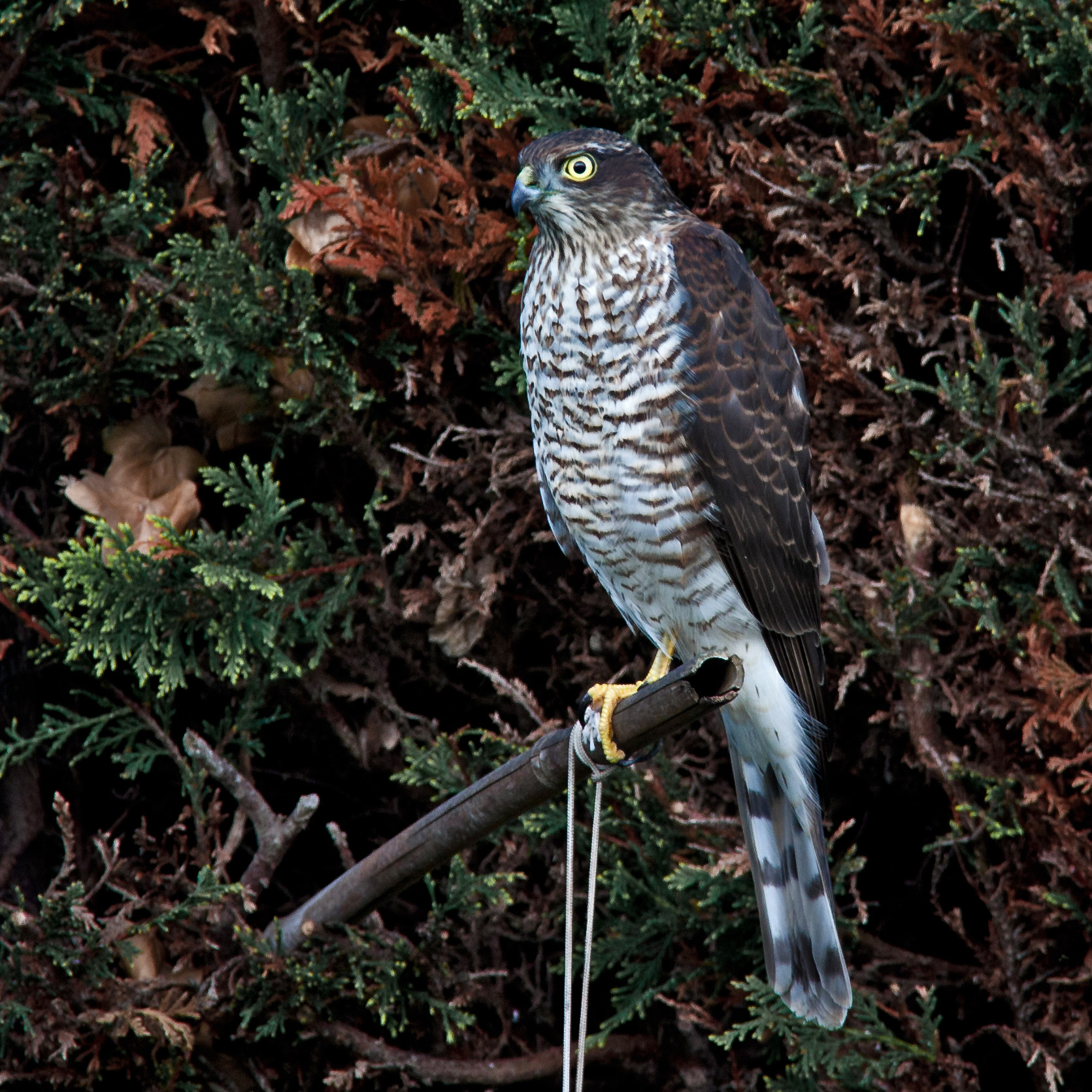
A Eurasian sparrowhawk perched on a cane that supports a bird feeder.

Feeding wild birds does carry potential risks. Birds may contract and spread diseases like salmonellosis by gathering at feeders; poorly maintained feeding and watering stations may also cause illness. Birds at feeders risk predation by cats and other animals, or may incur injury by flying into windows. Steps should be taken to reduce the risks to birds, such as: regular disinfecting of feeders and watering stations, ensuring feed has not become moldy or rancid, and proper positioning of feeders to reduce crowding and window collisions. Birds are less likely to fly into windows that have a wooden lattice. Collisions with windows can also be reduced by using window decals.

Depending on the feeder design and the type of feed used, species such as the house sparrow can dominate the use of the feeder. As a result, the house sparrow population can become inflated locally where feeders are used. In North America, where the house sparrow is an invasive species, competition from house sparrows can exclude the indigenous bluebirds from available nest sites as well as attack indigenous birds.

The use of bird feeders has been claimed to cause many other environmental problems; some of these were highlighted in a 2002 front-page article in The Wall Street Journal, which provoked responses nationwide from bird enthusiasts and scientists who refuted the article's arguments.

Prior to the publication of the Wall Street Journal article, Canadian ornithologist Jason Rogers also wrote about the environmental problems associated with the use of bird feeders in the journal Alberta Naturalist. In this article, Rogers explains how the use of bird feeders is inherently fraught with negative impacts and risks such as fostering dependency, altering natural distribution, density, and migration patterns, interfering with ecological processes, causing malnutrition, facilitating the spread of disease, and increasing the risk of death from cats, pesticides, hitting windows, and other causes.

== See also ==
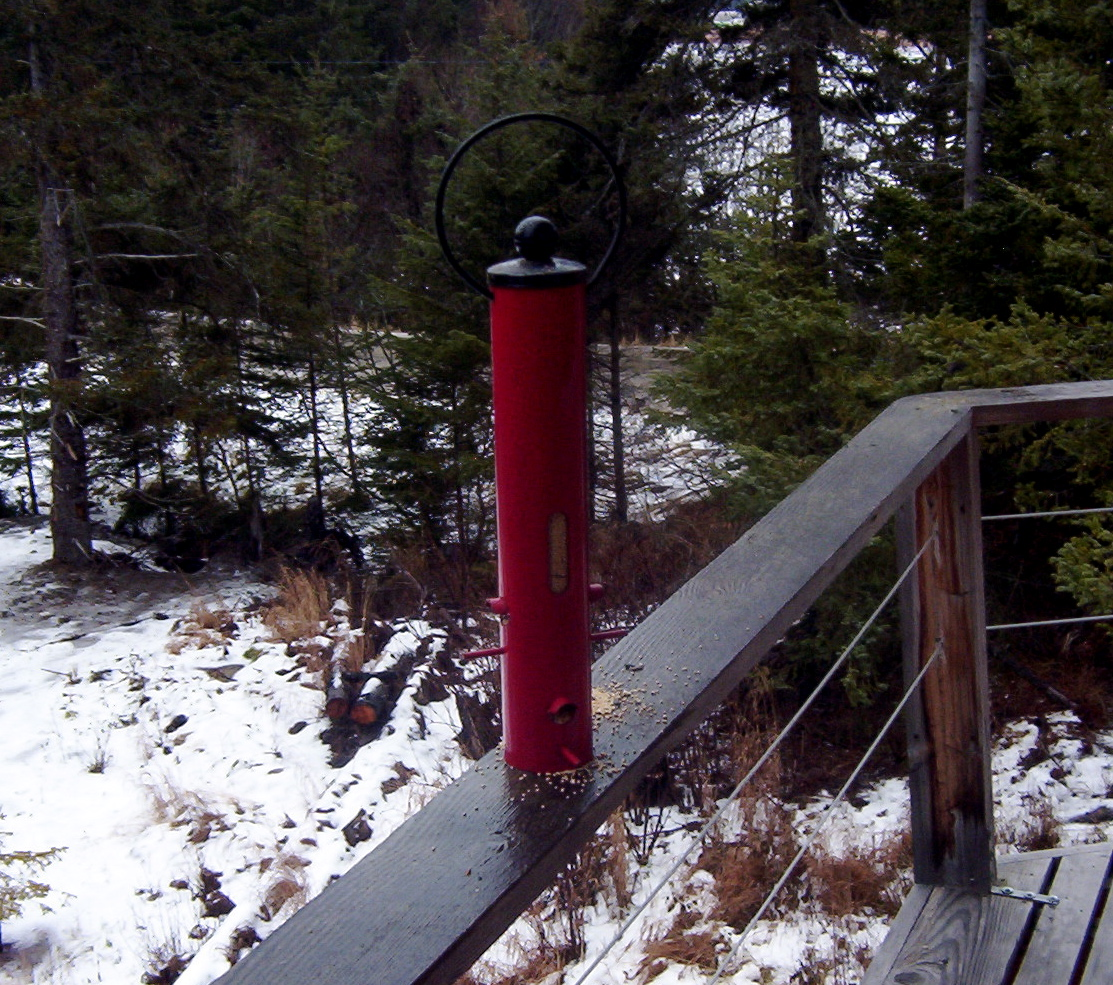
This metal bird feeder is designed to be squirrel-proof and bear resistant and cannot be opened while hanging.

- Bird bath
- Bird feeding
- Bird food
- Birdwatching
- Conservation ecology
- Manger
- Do not feed the animals
- Wildlife garden
  - Natural landscaping
  - Naturescaping
  - Sustainable landscaping

== Sources ==
- Baicich, Paul J.; Barker, Margaret A.; Henderson, Carrol L. (2015). Feeding Wild Birds in America : Culture Commerce & Conservation. College Station, Texas: Texas A&M University Press. ISBN 9781623492175.
