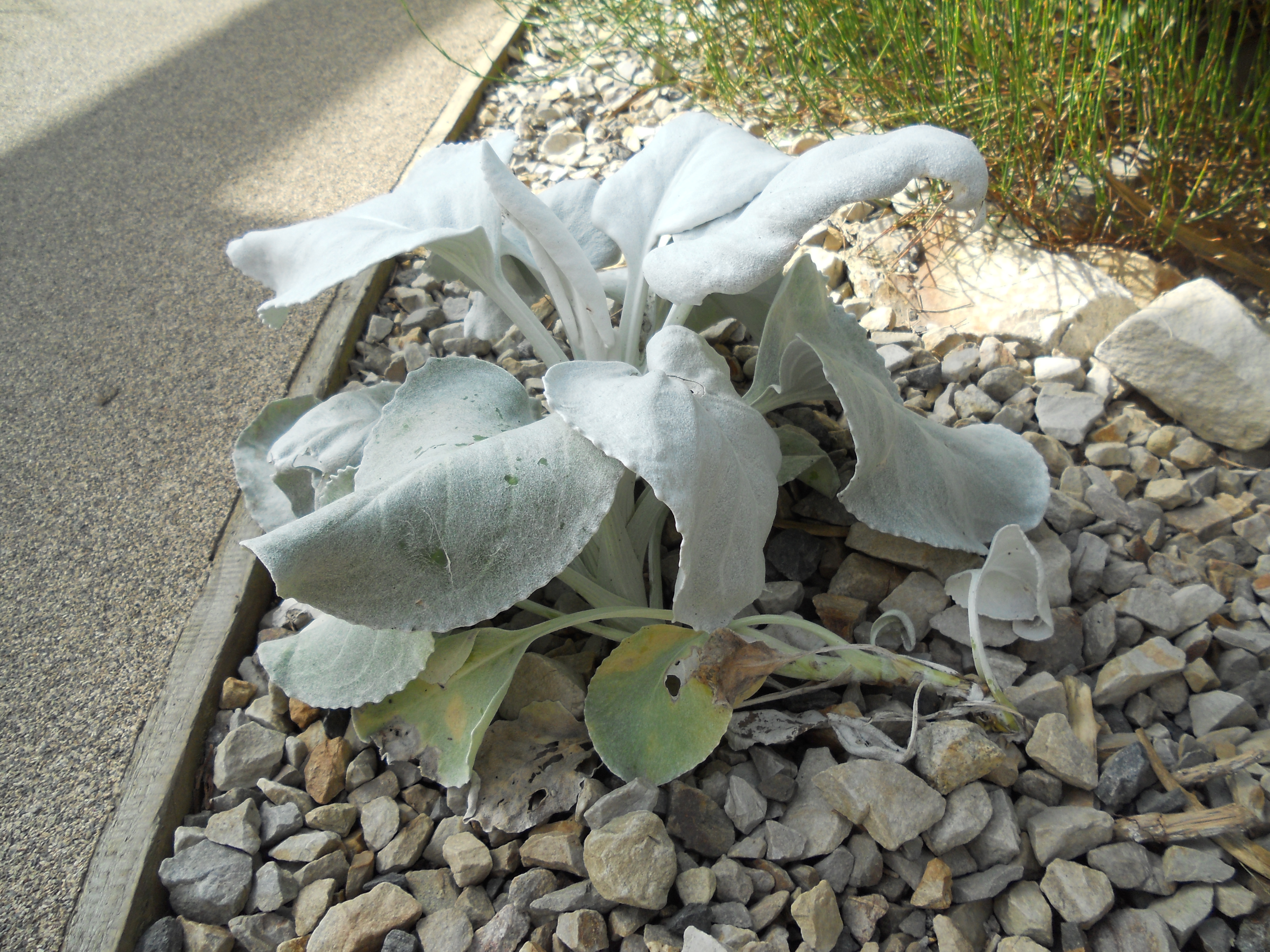
- Angel wings

Scientific classification
- Kingdom: Plantae
- Clade: Tracheophytes
- Clade: Angiosperms
- Clade: Eudicots
- Clade: Asterids
- Order: Asterales
- Family: Asteraceae
- Genus: Senecio
- Species: S. candicans

Binomial name
- Senecio candicans Wall. ex DC.

Synonyms
- Senecio candidans Wall.; Senecio campylodes var. candicans C.B.Cl.; Cineraria sarmentosa Lesch. ex DC.

= Senecio candicans =

Species of flowering plant

Senecio candicans, commonly known as angel wings and sea cabbage, is a succulent flowering plant in the Senecio genus that is native to Argentina and is grown as an ornamental plant elsewhere.

== Description ==
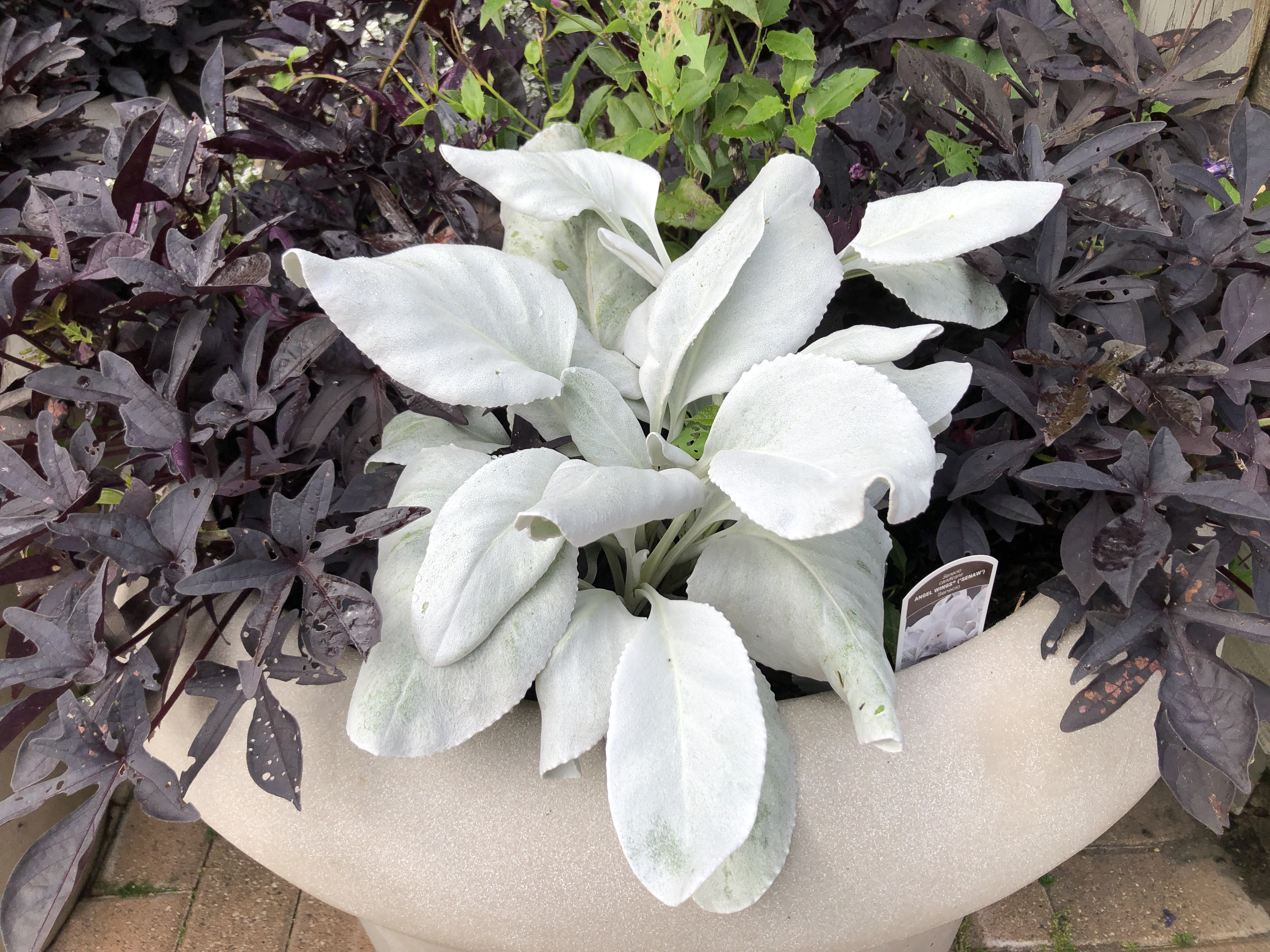
In a garden setting as an ornamental plant.

Growing up to 1 metre tall, it is a clump-forming plant with broad, serrated and ovate leaves that are silvery-white in colour (similar to Senecio cineraria). It produces flat, terminal clusters of yellow-orange flowers in the summer.

== Cultivation ==
It is grown as an ornamental plant for its showy foliage and drought tolerance as a low hedge for borders and in containers. Growing both indoors and outdoors in full sun or part shade, it is a perennial in USDA zone 8 and above. It can be propagated by cuttings.
