= National Bird-Feeding Month =

Annual observance in the United States

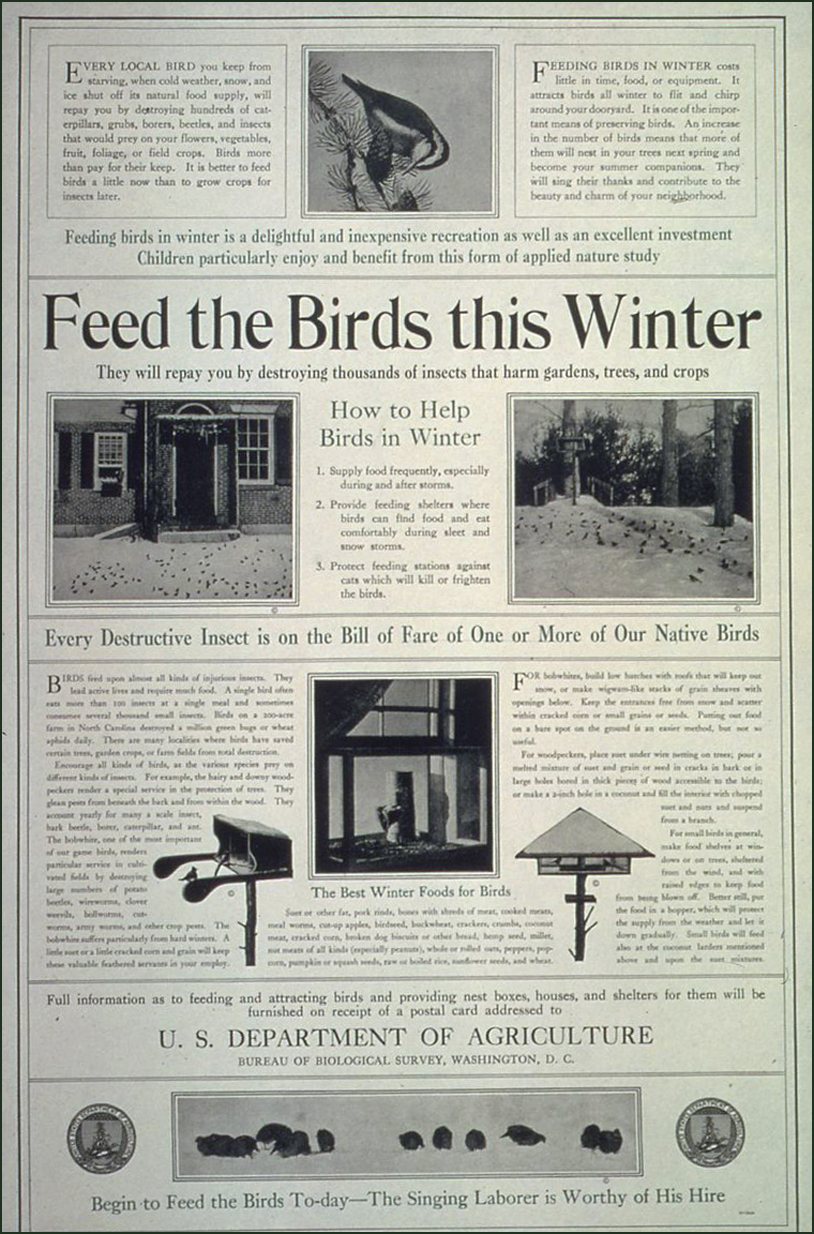
A 1918 call from the U.S. Department of Agriculture to feed birds in the winter.

February is National Bird-Feeding Month in the United States. This celebratory month was created to educate the public on the wild bird feeding and watching hobby. Because of National Bird-Feeding Month, February has become the month most recognized with wild bird feeding promotions and activities.

== History ==
On February 23, 1994, Congressman John Porter (R-IL) proclaimed February as National Bird-Feeding Month when he read a resolution into the Congressional Record. Below is the formal resolution that he read.

"Mr. Speaker, I would like to recognize February, one of the most difficult months in the United States for wild birds, as National Bird-Feeding Month. During this month, individuals are encouraged to provide food, water, and shelter to help wild birds survive. This assistance benefits the environment by supplementing the wild bird's natural diet of weed seeds and insects. Currently, one-third of the U.S. adult population feeds wild birds in their backyards.

In addition, Mr. Speaker, backyard bird feeding is an entertaining, educational, and inexpensive pastime enjoyed by children and adults. Bird feeding provides a needed break from today's frantic lifestyles. Adults enjoy the relaxation and peacefulness afforded by watching birds -- nature serves to relieve the stress and can get one's day going on a tranquil note.

Young children are naturally drawn to the activities involved in feeding wild birds, which can serve as excellent educational tools. Children can identify different species of birds with a field guide and can learn about the birds' feeding and living habits. These observations can then provide excellent research opportunities for school projects and reports.

Feeding wild birds in the backyard is an easy hobby to start and need not overtax the family budget. It can be as simple as mounting a single feeder outside a window and filling it with bird seed mix. For many people, the hobby progresses from there. They discover the relationship between the type and location of feeders, and the seeds offered in them, and the number and varieties of birds attracted. Parents can challenge an inquisitive child's mind as they explore together these factors in trying to encourage visits by their favorite birds."

In 2013, Westbrook Boys Varsity Basketball began their state playoff run with the theme "Feed The Birds."

== Past themes ==
Each year, a new theme for National Bird-Feeding Month is selected, and promoted by the National Bird-Feeding Society. The theme for 2012 was "If You Feed Them, They Will Come..."

The theme for 2011 was "Most Wanted - America's Top Ten Backyard Birds" and features ten species from the east and west that are among the most popular to attract. In 2010, the theme was "Hatching Out – An Introduction to the Wild Bird Feeding Hobby."
