= Bird food =

Food intended for consumption by wild and domestic birds

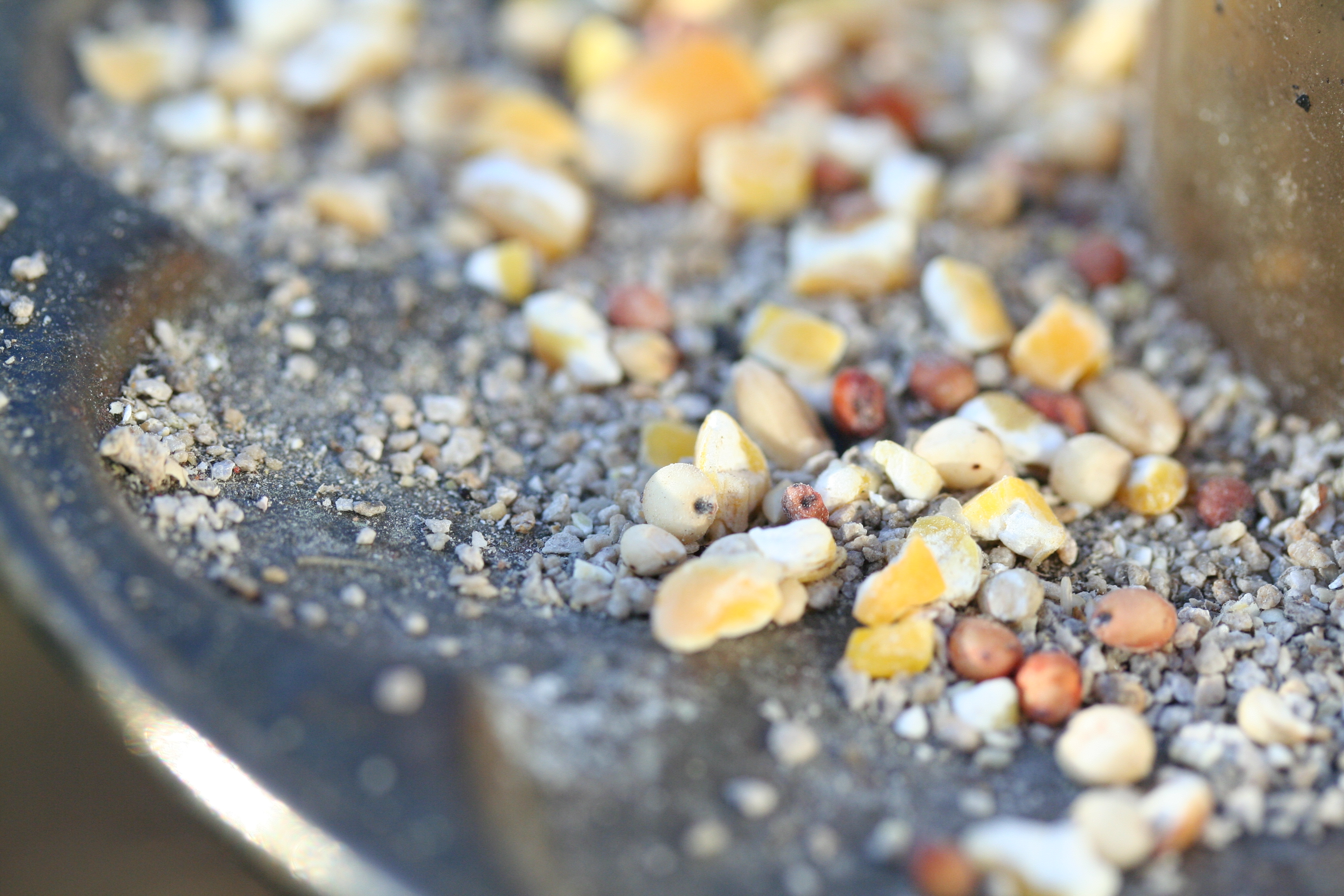
A mixture of seeds in a bird feeder

Bird food or bird seed is food intended for consumption by wild, commercial, or pet birds. It is typically composed of seeds, nuts, dry fruits, flour, and may be enriched with vitamins and proteins.

Bird food can vary depending upon dietary habits and beak shapes. Dietary habits refer to whether birds are naturally omnivores, carnivores, herbivores, insectivores or nectarivores. The shape of the beak, which correlates with dietary habits, is important in determining how a bird can crack the seed coat and obtain the meat of the seed.

Black-oil sunflower seeds attract the widest variety of birds and are commonly used in backyard bird feeders. Using a variety of seeds can help attract specific types of birds to gardens and backyards. In general, mixtures predominantly containing red millet, oats, and other "fillers" are not attractive to most birds. These mixtures can lead to waste as the birds sort through the mix, and can potentially result in fungal and bacterial growth.

While popular, bird feeders carry potential risks for the birds that feed from them, including disease, malnutrition, and predation by animals. Researchers recommend that bird feeders should be disinfected every time they are refilled.

== Types ==
=== Commercial ===
==== Non-farm ====
Commercial bird food is widely available for feeding wild and domesticated birds, in the forms of both seed combinations and pellets.

When feeding wild birds, the Royal Society for the Protection of Birds (RSPB) suggests that it be done year-round, with different mixes of nutrients being offered each season. The RSPB also recommends additional fat content in the winter months, and additional proteins in the form of nuts, seeds, and dried worms in summer, when birds are changing their plumage and may be moulting.

==== Farm ====
Farmed birds that are fed with commercial bird food are typically given a pre-blended feed consisting largely of grain, protein, mineral, and vitamin supplements. Examples of commercial bird food for chickens include chick starter medicated crumbles, chick grower crumbles, egg layer mash, egg layer pellet, egg layer crumbles, egg producer pellets, and boiler maker med crumbles. Young chicks are often fed pellet crumbles, although mash tends to be ground finer.

=== Other ===
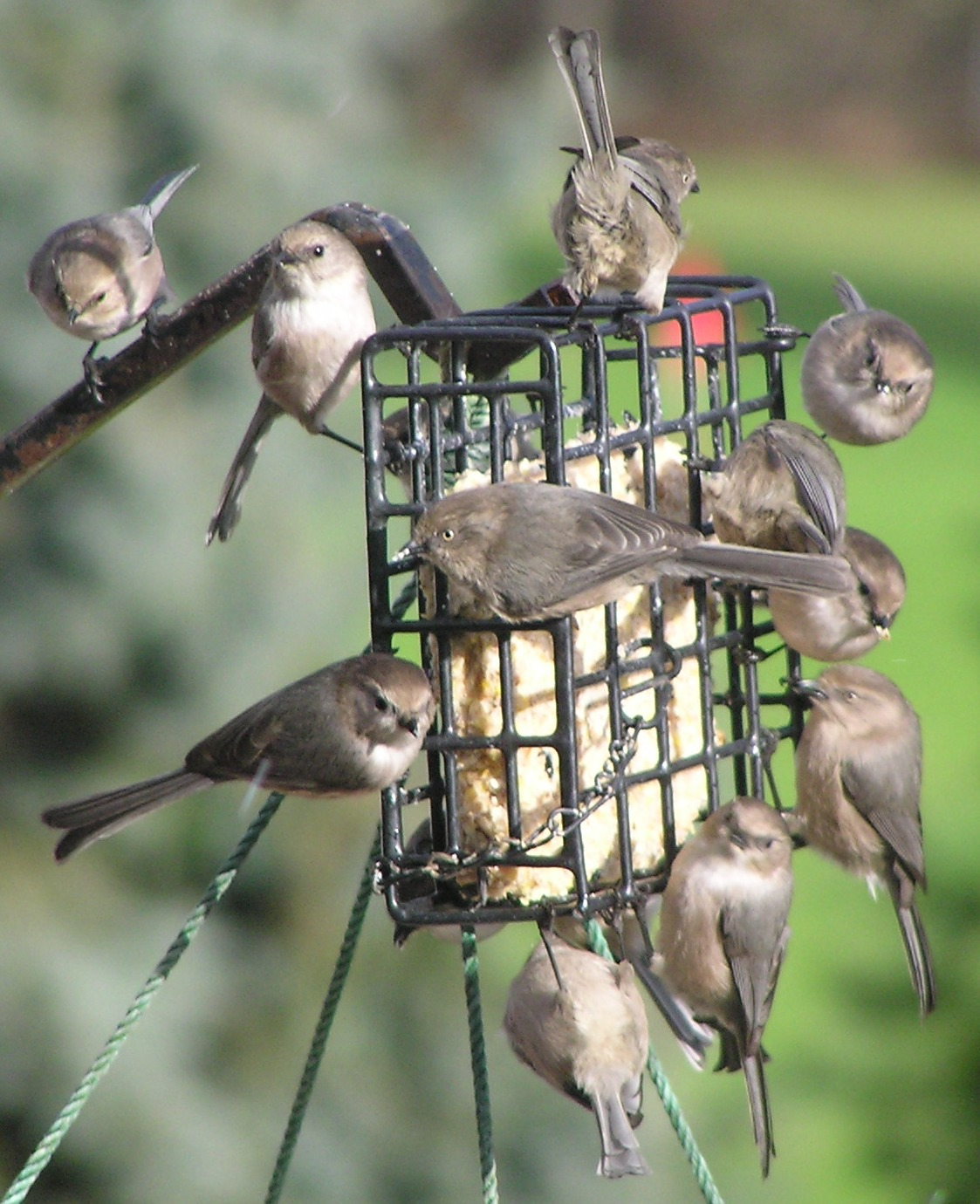
Bushtits eating suet from a bird feeder

==== Seed ====
Black sunflower seeds are often used in bird feeders, as they attract a wide variety of birds, have a high ratio of seed material to shell, and are high in fat content, the latter of which is nutritionally important for winter birds. Other popular seeds include Niger, or thistle seed, a favorite of goldfinches and redpolls. Millet is used to attract sparrows and juncos, as well as safflower for cardinals.

Although bread and kitchen scraps are often fed to ducks and gulls, this is strongly discouraged as this can cause angel wing disease. Chickens are commonly fed maize, wheat, barley, sorghum, and milling by-products in a mixture traditionally called chicken scratch.

==== Non-seed ====
Suet is often offered to insect-eating birds, such as nuthatches and woodpeckers, while sugar-water can attract hummingbirds. However, a narrow diet of such foods can lead to nutrient deficiencies and increased defecation for these birds. Companion parrots are fed fresh fruit and vegetables in addition to seeds.

Bird foods based on seeds and non-seed supplies are commonly obtained as by-products on farms, but can also be bought from independent retailers.
