= Angel wing =

Disorder of birds causing misshapen wings

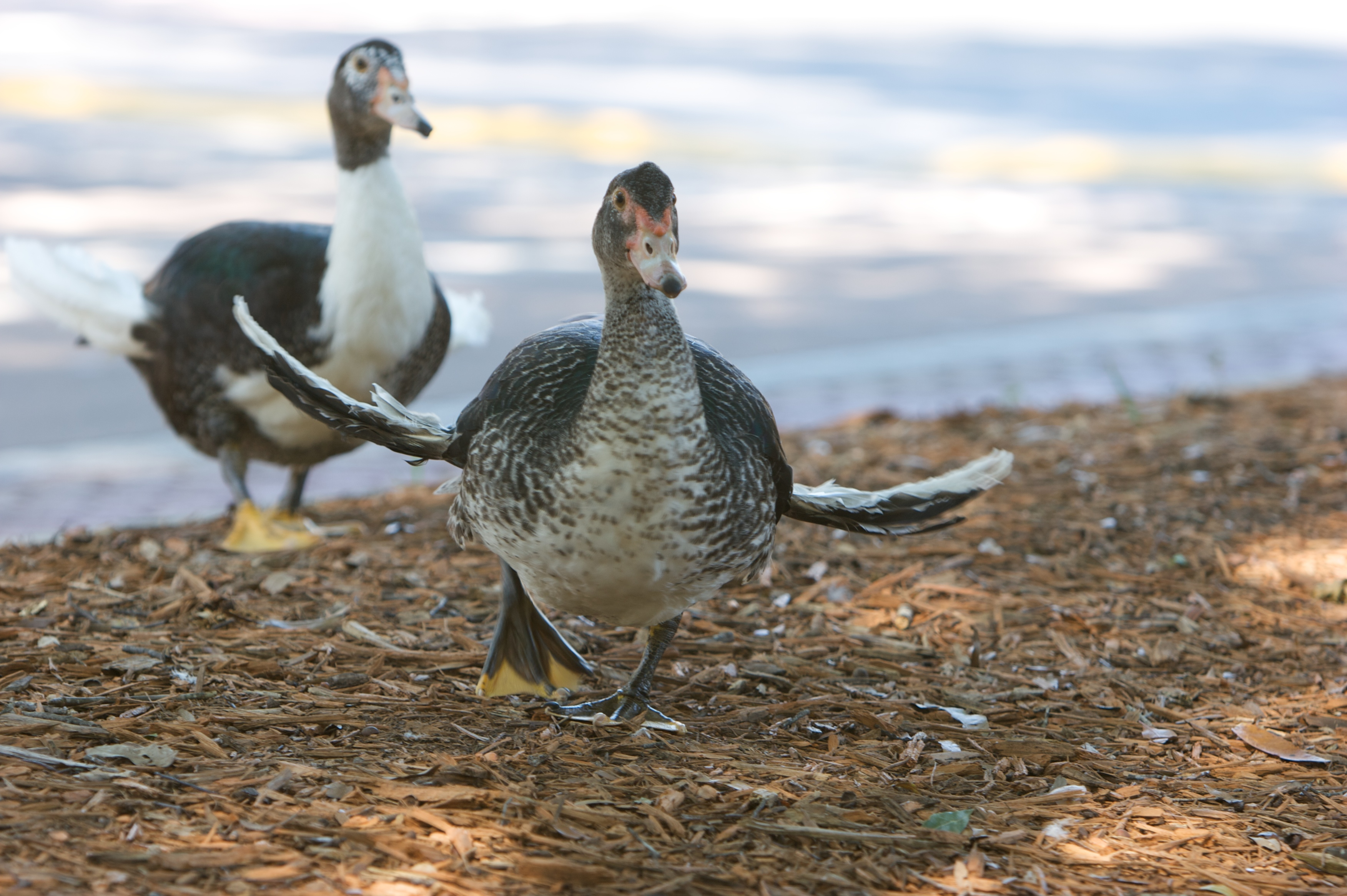
A duck with angel wing

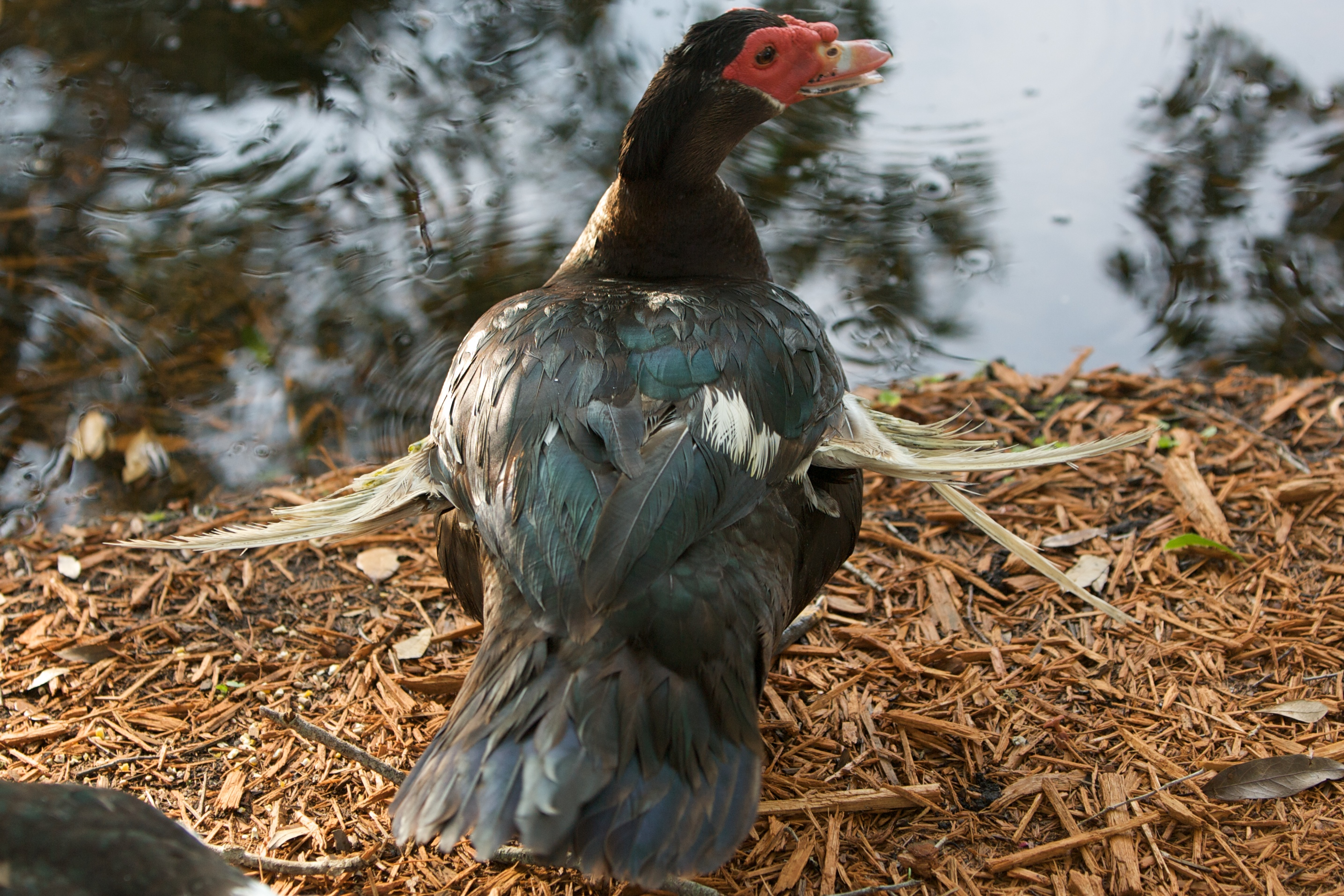
A Muscovy duck with angel wing

Angel wing, also known as airplane wing, slipped wing, crooked wing, and drooped wing, is a syndrome that affects primarily aquatic birds, such as geese and ducks, in which the last joint of the wing is twisted with the wing feathers pointing out laterally, instead of lying against the body. Males develop it more frequently than females. It has also been reported in goshawks, bustard chicks, and psittacine birds (budgerigars, macaws, and conures).

== Description ==
The theoretical causes of angel wing are genetics, the excessive intake of carbohydrates and proteins, together with insufficient intake of vitamin E, low dietary calcium and manganese deficiency. There is evidence that a link between the consumption of bread and the development of angel wing is present, although direct evidence is little. Because of this, some experts and academics deny the connection.
