= Wild Bird Centers of America =

Wild Bird stores in America

The Wild Bird Centers of America, Inc., is a national franchisor of wild bird specialty retail stores. Most stores offer educational programs to the general public including bird walks and seminars with local experts.

== History ==
Wild Bird Centers of America was founded in 1985 in the suburbs of Washington, D.C. The first Wild Bird Center retail store was located in Cabin John, Maryland. The company and its franchisees have been recognized by industry publications and organizations. In 2010, the company published a history book about the backyard bird-feeding hobby. and partnered with the Commerce Corporation to support a "store-within-a-store" program for garden centers and hardware stores. In 2016, Wild Bird Centers of America, Inc. was acquired by Global Harvest Food, Ltd., a national bird seed manufacturer headquartered in Washington state.

== Present Company ==
The Wild Bird Centers of America supports approximately 30 retail outlets in about 14 states and provinces.
