= 2019 in film =

2019 in film is an overview of events, including the highest-grossing films, award ceremonies, critics' lists of the best films of 2019, festivals, a list of country-specific lists of films released, and movie programming. Avengers: Endgame was the year's highest grossing film and became the highest-grossing film of all-time until Avatar regained the top spot in 2021. United Artists celebrated its 100th anniversary, and DreamWorks Pictures and DreamWorks Animation celebrated their 25th anniversary.

== Evaluation of the year ==
In his article highlighting the best movies of 2019, Richard Brody of The New Yorker said,

It's the year of apocalyptic cinema of the highest order, the year in which three of our best filmmakers have responded with vast ambition, invention, and inspiration to the crises at hand, including the threats to American democracy, the catastrophic menaces arising from global warming, the corrosive cruelty of ethnic hatreds and nationalist prejudices, and the poisonous overconcentration of money and power. At the same time, it's a year of inside-movies practicalities, of special attention to the business at hand, because of the structural threats to the movie business from new and powerful players. The major crisis specific to cinema outleaps even the great merits of individual movies and invokes basic and comprehensive questions of which movies can be seen and how those movies are acknowledged. It's a terrific year for movies, but it would seem much less so if we only considered movies in wide release. Versions of that refrain come up every year, but what used to be merely a gap between the multiplexes and limited releases has now become an abyss.

== Highest-grossing films ==
The top films released in 2019 by worldwide gross are as follows:

Highest-grossing films of 2019
Rank	Title	Distributor	Worldwide gross
1	Avengers: Endgame	Disney	$2,799,439,100 (Note: Excludes grosses from subsequent re-releases.)
2	The Lion King	Disney	$1,656,943,394
3	Frozen 2	Disney	$1,450,026,933
4	Spider-Man: Far From Home	Sony	$1,131,927,996
5	Captain Marvel	Disney	$1,128,274,794
6	Joker	Warner Bros.	$1,078,751,311
7	Star Wars: The Rise of Skywalker	Disney	$1,074,144,248
8	Toy Story 4	Disney	$1,073,841,294
9	Aladdin	Disney	$1,050,693,953
10	Jumanji: The Next Level	Sony	$801,693,929

Avengers: Endgame became the fifth film to gross $2 billion worldwide and the highest-grossing film of all time. The Lion King, Frozen 2, Spider-Man: Far From Home, Captain Marvel, Joker, Star Wars: The Rise of Skywalker, Toy Story 4, and Aladdin all grossed $1 billion, with the second, third, and eighth as the first, second, and fifth highest-grossing animated films, respectively. Joker became the first R-rated film in history to surpass $1 billion.

=== 2019 box office records ===
- The Marvel Cinematic Universe became the first film franchise to gross $18 billion, $19 billion, $20 billion, $21 billion, and $22 billion with the release of Captain Marvel, Avengers: Endgame, and Spider-Man: Far From Home.
- The Star Wars franchise became the second film franchise to gross $10 billion with the release of Star Wars: The Rise of Skywalker.
- China set the all-time biggest global one-month record in February 2019 with CN¥11.09 billion ($1.63 billion), as a result of Chinese New Year season, surpassing the previous record set by China in February 2018. The month's highest-grossing film was the domestic Chinese film The Wandering Earth, while the highest-grossing foreign film that month was Alita: Battle Angel.
- Toy Story 4, The Lion King, and Frozen 2 all earned over $1 billion in the same year, making it the first time three animated films surpassed $1 billion in the same year.

==== Studio records ====
- Walt Disney Studios became the first studio in history to surpass $10 billion in worldwide box office grosses in a year. It was also the first studio to make 5, 6 and 7 films gross over $1 billion in a year. (Note: It previously had the record for four films in 2016, and two films in 2010.)
- Spider-Man: Far From Home became Sony Pictures' highest-grossing film. The record would be surpassed by 2021's Spider-Man: No Way Home.
- With Toy Story 4, Pixar became the first animation studio to have four animated films (along with Toy Story 3, Finding Dory, and Incredibles 2) each surpass $1 billion at the worldwide box office, and also the second animated film series to have two installments surpass $1 billion at the worldwide box office, after the Despicable Me franchise in 2017.

==== Film records ====
- The Wandering Earth set the all-time opening record in China, grossing $349 million in its first seven days, which also made it the second biggest opening in any territory (after Star Wars: The Force Awakens in North America).
- Pokémon Detective Pikachu earned the best North American opening for a film based on a video game, with a $58 million debut. By June 14, 2019, Detective Pikachu became the highest-grossing video game film adaptation in North America, surpassing Lara Croft: Tomb Raider (2001).
- Avengers: Endgame set numerous box office records, including becoming the highest-grossing film of all time.
  - With the release of Captain Marvel, Avengers: Endgame, and Spider-Man: Far From Home, the Marvel Cinematic Universe became the first film franchise to have nine films surpass $1 billion and two films to gross more than $2 billion.
- Capernaum became the highest-grossing Middle-Eastern film of all time, having earned more than $50 million worldwide (including $43.5 million in China) by 16 May 2019.
- Aladdin became the highest-grossing release of all time in the Middle East, and had the year's biggest opening weekend for a foreign film as well as this year's highest-grossing foreign film in Japan to date. The film has also surpassed Independence Day (1996) to become the highest-grossing film of Will Smith's career. The film also became the highest-grossing Disney film ever in South Korea, not including films from the Marvel Cinematic Universe.
- In June, Toy Story 4 set the record for the biggest opening for an animated film, with $244.5 million. However, the record was surpassed the following month by The Lion King, which grossed $246 million. The latter then became the fastest animated film to gross $1 billion worldwide, doing so in 21 days, surpassing Incredibles 2 (46 days). The Lion King then surpassed Frozen (2013) to become the highest-grossing animated film and highest-grossing musical film of all time in only 31 days. On the other hand, Toy Story 4 surpassed Toy Story 3 to become the highest-grossing film of the series.
- The Lion King set the record for the widest opening weekend and widest release ever for North American film history, with 4,725 and 4,802 theaters, respectively. On August 11, the film surpassed Beauty and the Beast (2017) as the highest-grossing remake of all time worldwide. On August 26, the film become the first animated film to grossed $1 billion at overseas box office outside North America.
- Ne Zha set the record for the biggest opening for an animated film in China, with $91.5 million, this was also the highest for a non-Hollywood animated film. It later became the first non-Hollywood animated film to earn $500 million (in 17 days), $600 million (in 25 days), and $700 million (in 46 days) and the first animated film not released by Universal, Disney, Paramount, or Fox to do so.
- Joker became the highest-grossing R-rated film of all time, and the first R-rated film to pass the billion-dollar mark at the worldwide box office.
- In November, Frozen 2 surpassed the record set by The Lion King earlier in July, as the biggest opening weekend for an animated and musical film with $358.5 million worldwide.
- 2019 is the first year to have nine films cross the billion-dollar milestone, surpassing 2015's and 2018's record of five billion-dollar films.

== Events ==
- March 20 – The Walt Disney Company completes its acquisition of the assets of 21st Century Fox, which includes 20th Century Fox and its subsidiaries.
- April 26 – Avengers: Endgame is released in theatres worldwide, breaking many box-office records, including becoming the second highest grossing movie of all time.
- November 23 – After a disorder following the screening of the gang-themed British film Blue Story (released the previous day) at Star City, in Birmingham, England, UK cinema chains cancel all screenings of the film.
- December 4 - CBS and Viacom agreed to merge back into one entity after 13 years. Both companies came to an agreement on the management team for the merger. The reunited company's new name is ViacomCBS.

=== Award ceremonies ===
Date	Event	Host	Location
January 6	76th Golden Globe Awards	Hollywood Foreign Press Association	Beverly Hills, California, U.S.
January 12	24th Forqué Awards	EGEDA	Zaragoza, Spain
January 13	24th Critics' Choice Awards	Broadcast Film Critics Association	Santa Monica, California, U.S.
January 19	Producers Guild of America Awards 2018	Producers Guild of America	Beverly Hills, California, U.S.
January 27	25th Screen Actors Guild Awards	SAG-AFTRA	Los Angeles, California, U.S.
January 28	54th Guldbagge Awards	Swedish Film Institute	Stockholm, Sweden
February 2	46th Annie Awards	International Animated Film Association	Los Angeles, California, U.S.
February 2	71st Directors Guild of America Awards	Directors Guild of America	Los Angeles, California, U.S.
February 2	33rd Goya Awards	Academy of Cinematographic Arts and Sciences of Spain	Seville, Spain
February 2	9th Magritte Awards	Académie André Delvaux	Brussels, Belgium
February 10	72nd British Academy Film Awards	British Academy of Film and Television Arts	London, England, UK
February 22	23rd Satellite Awards	International Press Academy	Century City, Los Angeles, California, U.S.
February 23	39th Golden Raspberry Awards	Golden Raspberry Award Foundation	Los Angeles, California, U.S.
February 23	34th Independent Spirit Awards	Independent Spirit Awards	Santa Monica, California, U.S.
February 24	91st Academy Awards	Academy of Motion Picture Arts and Sciences	Hollywood, California, U.S.
March 1	42nd Japan Academy Film Prize	Nippon Academy-shō Association	Tokyo, Japan
March 23	64th Filmfare Awards	Filmfare	Mumbai, India
March 27	64th David di Donatello	Accademia del Cinema Italiano	Rome, Italy
April 14	38th Hong Kong Film Awards	Hong Kong Film Awards Association Ltd.	Tsim Sha Tsui, Hong Kong
April 28	2019 FAMAS Awards	Filipino Academy of Movie Arts and Sciences	Pasig, Philippines
September 13	45th Saturn Awards	Academy of Science Fiction, Fantasy and Horror Films	Burbank, California, U.S.
November 21	40th Blue Dragon Film Awards	Sports Chosun	Incheon, South Korea
November 23	56th Golden Horse Awards	Motion Picture Development Foundation R.O.C.	Taipei, Taiwan
December 23	66th National Film Awards	Directorate of Film Festivals	

=== Festivals ===
List of some of the film festivals for 2019 that have been accredited by the International Federation of Film Producers Associations (FIAPF).

Date	Event	Host	Location
January 14–February 3	2019 Sundance Film Festival	Sundance Institute	Park City, Utah, United States
February 9–14	69th Berlin International Film Festival	Berlin International Film Festival	Berlin, Germany
May 14–25	2019 Cannes Film Festival	Cannes Film Festival	Cannes, France
August 28–September 7	76th Venice International Film Festival	Venice Film Festival	Venice, Italy
September 5–15	2019 Toronto International Film Festival	Toronto International Film Festival	Toronto, Ontario, Canada
September 20–28	67th San Sebastián International Film Festival	San Sebastián International Film Festival	San Sebastián, Spain

== Awards ==
Category/Organization	77th Golden Globe Awards January 5, 2020		25th Critics' Choice Awards January 12, 2020	Producers, Directors, Screen Actors, and Writers Guild Awards January 18-February 1, 2020	73rd BAFTA Awards February 2, 2020	92nd Academy Awards February 9, 2020
Category/Organization	Drama	Musical or Comedy	25th Critics' Choice Awards January 12, 2020	Producers, Directors, Screen Actors, and Writers Guild Awards January 18-February 1, 2020	73rd BAFTA Awards February 2, 2020	92nd Academy Awards February 9, 2020
Best Film	1917	Once Upon a Time in Hollywood		1917		Parasite
Best Director	Sam Mendes; 1917		Sam Mendes; 1917 (tie); Bong Joon-ho; Parasite (tie)	Sam Mendes; 1917		Bong Joon-ho; Parasite
Best Actor	Joaquin Phoenix; Joker	Taron Egerton; Rocketman	Joaquin Phoenix; Joker			
Best Actress	Renée Zellweger; Judy	Awkwafina; The Farewell	Renée Zellweger; Judy			
Best Supporting Actor	Brad Pitt; Once Upon a Time in Hollywood					
Best Supporting Actress	Laura Dern; Marriage Story					
Best Screenplay, Adapted	Quentin Tarantino; Once Upon a Time in Hollywood		Greta Gerwig; Little Women	Taika Waititi; Jojo Rabbit		
Best Screenplay, Original	Quentin Tarantino; Once Upon a Time in Hollywood		Quentin Tarantino; Once Upon a Time in Hollywood	Bong Joon-ho & Han Jin-won; Parasite		
Best Animated Film	Missing Link		Toy Story 4		Klaus	Toy Story 4
Best Original Score	Hildur Guðnadóttir; Joker			—N/a	Hildur Guðnadóttir; Joker	
Best Original Song	"(I'm Gonna) Love Me Again"; Rocketman		"(I'm Gonna) Love Me Again"; Rocketman (tie) "Glasgow (No Place Like Home)"; Wild Rose (tie)	—N/a	—N/a	"(I'm Gonna) Love Me Again"; Rocketman
Best Foreign Language Film	Parasite			—N/a	Parasite	
Best Documentary (Note: From 2016 onward, the category was shifted from the Critics' Choice Awards to the ancillary Critics' Choice Documentary Awards.)	—N/a		Apollo 11		For Sama	American Factory

Palme d'Or (72nd Cannes Film Festival):

Parasite (기생충), directed by Bong Joon-ho, South Korea

Golden Lion (76th Venice International Film Festival):

Joker, directed by Todd Phillips, United States

Golden Bear (69th Berlin International Film Festival):

Synonyms (Synonymes), directed by Nadav Lapid, Israel

== 2019 films ==
=== By country/region ===
- List of American films of 2019
- List of Argentine films of 2019
- List of Australian films of 2019
- List of Bangladeshi films of 2019
- List of British films of 2019
- List of Canadian films of 2019
- List of Chinese films of 2019
- List of Filipino films of 2019
- List of French films of 2019
- List of Hong Kong films of 2019
- List of Indian films of 2019
  - List of Assamese films of 2019
  - List of Bengali films of 2019
  - List of Gujarati films of 2019
  - List of Hindi films of 2019
  - List of Kannada films of 2019
  - List of Malayalam films of 2019
  - List of Marathi films of 2019
  - List of Odia films of 2019
  - List of Punjabi films of 2019
  - List of Tamil films of 2019
  - List of Telugu films of 2019
  - List of Tulu films of 2019
- List of Indonesian films
- List of Japanese films of 2019
- List of Malaysian films of 2019
- List of Maldivian films of 2019
- List of Nepali films of 2019
- List of Pakistani films of 2019
- List of Portuguese films of 2019
- List of Russian films of 2019
- List of South Korean films of 2019
- List of Spanish films of 2019
- List of Turkish films

=== By genre/medium ===
- List of action films of 2019
- List of animated feature films of 2019
- List of avant-garde films of 2019
- List of comedy films of 2019
- List of drama films of 2019
- List of horror films of 2019
- List of science fiction films of 2019
- List of thriller films of 2019
- List of western films of 2019

== Deaths ==
Month	Date	Name	Age	Country	Profession	Notable films
January	1	Ivo Gregurević	66	Croatia	Actor	My Uncle's Legacy; When the Dead Start Singing
January	4	Ivan Bortnik	79	Russia	Actor	Family Relations; Mirror for a Hero
January	4	Louisa Moritz	82	Cuba	Actress	One Flew Over the Cuckoo's Nest; Death Race 2000
January	6	Gregg Rudloff	63	US	Sound Engineer	The Matrix; Mad Max: Fury Road
January	6	W. Morgan Sheppard	86	UK	Actor	The Duellists; Transformers
January	9	Verna Bloom	80	US	Actress	Animal House; High Plains Drifter
January	9	Paul Koslo	74	Germany	Actor	Vanishing Point; The Omega Man
January	9	Paolo Paoloni	89	Italy	Actor	Fantozzi; And the Ship Sails On
January	11	Fernando Luján	79	Mexico	Actor	The Second Woman; Vacations in Acapulco
January	12	Etsuko Ichihara	82	Japan	Actress	The Eel; Samurai Rebellion
January	15	Bill Anagnos	60	US	Stuntman	Malcolm X; The Warriors
January	15	Carol Channing	97	US	Actress	Thoroughly Modern Millie; Thumbelina
January	17	Daniel C. Striepeke	88	US	Makeup Artist	Forrest Gump; Saving Private Ryan
January	19	Muriel Pavlow	97	UK	Actress	Murder, She Said; Reach for the Sky
January	20	Andrew G. Vajna	74	Hungary	Producer	First Blood; Total Recall
January	21	Kaye Ballard	93	US	Actress	The Girl Most Likely; A House Is Not a Home
January	22	James Frawley	82	US	Director, Actor	The Muppet Movie; The Big Bus
January	23	Jonas Mekas	96	Lithuania	Documentarian	Reminiscences of a Journey to Lithuania; Walden
January	25	Dušan Makavejev	86	Serbia	Director, Screenwriter	The Coca-Cola Kid; Montenegro
January	26	Michel Legrand	86	France	Composer	The Thomas Crown Affair; Yentl
January	30	Dick Miller	90	US	Actor	The Little Shop of Horrors; Gremlins
February	1	Clive Swift	82	UK	Actor	Frenzy; A Passage to India
February	2	Catherine Burns	73	US	Actress	Last Summer; Red Sky at Morning
February	3	Julie Adams	92	US	Actress	Creature from the Black Lagoon; Bend of the River
February	3	Carmen Duncan	76	Australia	Actress	Harlequin; Turkey Shoot
February	4	Nita Bieber	92	US	Actress	Summer Stock; News Hounds
February	7	Albert Finney	82	UK	Actor	Tom Jones; Murder on the Orient Express
February	9	Ron W. Miller	85	US	Producer, Executive	The Rescuers; Tron
February	10	Carmen Argenziano	75	US	Actor	Broken Arrow; The Accused
February	10	Mario Bernardo	99	Italy	Cinematographer	The Hawks and the Sparrows; Ro.Go.Pa.G.
February	10	Jan-Michael Vincent	74	US	Actor	The World's Greatest Athlete; Bite the Bullet
February	13	Marisa Solinas	79	Italy	Actress, Singer	Boccaccio '70; La commare secca
February	16	Bruno Ganz	77	Switzerland	Actor	Downfall; Wings of Desire
February	19	Giulio Brogi	83	Italy	Actor	St. Michael Had a Rooster; The Spider's Stratagem
February	20	Chelo Alonso	85	Cuba	Actress	Morgan, the Pirate; Run, Man, Run
February	20	Claude Goretta	89	Switzerland	Director	The Lacemaker; The Invitation
February	20	Vinny Vella	72	US	Actor	Casino; Find Me Guilty
February	21	Stanley Donen	94	US	Director, Choreographer	Singin' in the Rain; Funny Face
February	21	Peter Tork	77	US	Actor, Singer	Head; The Brady Bunch Movie
February	22	Kodi Ramakrishna	69	India	Director	Ammoru; Arundhati
February	22	Morgan Woodward	93	US	Actor	Cool Hand Luke; A Small Town in Texas
February	23	Katherine Helmond	89	US	Actress	Time Bandits; Brazil
February	23	Shmuel Wolf	85	Israel	Actor	Sallah Shabati; An American Hippie in Israel
February	28	André Previn	89	Germany	Composer	My Fair Lady; Gigi
March	2	Med Hondo	83	Mauritania	Director, Actor	Soleil O; Sarraounia
March	4	Luke Perry	52	US	Actor	The Fifth Element; Buffy the Vampire Slayer
March	5	Susan Harrison	80	US	Actress	Sweet Smell of Success; Key Witness
March	5	Jacques Loussier	84	France	Composer	Dark of the Sun; Snow Job
March	7	Pino Caruso	84	Italy	Actor	Malicious; The Sunday Woman
March	7	William J. Creber	87	US	Production Designer	The Greatest Story Ever Told; Planet of the Apes
March	7	Sidney Sheinberg	84	US	Producer, Executive	McHale's Navy; A Simple Wish
March	16	Richard Erdman	93	US	Actor	Stalag 17; Tora! Tora! Tora!
March	16	Barbara Hammer	79	US	Director, Documentarian	Nitrate Kisses; Tender Fictions
March	16	Tom Hatten	92	US	Actor	Spies Like Us; The Secret of NIMH
March	18	John Carl Buechler	66	US	Director, Makeup Artist	Troll; Friday the 13th Part VII: The New Blood
March	21	Pyotr Zaychenko	75	Russia	Actor	Planet Parade; Taxi Blues
March	23	Larry Cohen	82	US	Director, Screenwriter	Phone Booth; It's Alive
March	23	Denise DuBarry	63	US	Actress	Monster in the Closet; Being There
March	24	Nancy Gates	93	US	Actress	Suddenly; No Man's Woman
March	24	Michael Lynne	77	US	Studio Executive	The Lord of the Rings; Hairspray
March	24	Joseph Pilato	70	US	Actor	Day of the Dead; Pulp Fiction
March	29	Shane Rimmer	89	Canada	Actor	Out of Africa; The Hunger
March	29	Agnès Varda	90	France	Director, Screenwriter	Cléo from 5 to 7; Vagabond
April	2	Mahendran	79	India	Director, Screenwriter	Mullum Malarum; Uthiripookkal
April	3	Jerzy Wójcik	88	Poland	Cinematographer	Ashes and Diamonds; Samson
April	4	Barry Malkin	80	US	Film Editor	The Godfather Part II; Rumble Fish
April	4	Roberta Haynes	91	US	Actress	Return to Paradise; Point Blank
April	5	Nadja Regin	87	Serbia	Actress	Goldfinger; From Russia with Love
April	7	Seymour Cassel	84	US	Actor	Faces; Minnie and Moskowitz
April	12	Georgia Engel	70	US	Actress	Taking Off; Grown Ups 2
April	12	John McEnery	75	UK	Actor	Romeo and Juliet; Hamlet
April	13	Gerry Becker	68	US	Actor	Spider-Man; Die Hard with a Vengeance
April	13	Norman Garwood	73	UK	Production Designer	Brazil; Hook
April	14	Bibi Andersson	83	Sweden	Actress	Wild Strawberries; Persona
April	16	Fay McKenzie	101	US	Actress	The Party; Cowboy Serenade
April	20	David V. Picker	87	US	Producer, Executive	The Jerk; The Crucible
April	21	Steve Golin	64	US	Producer	Spotlight; The Revenant
April	21	Ken Kercheval	83	US	Actor	F.I.S.T.; The Seven-Ups
April	23	Mark Medoff	79	US	Screenwriter	Children of a Lesser God; City of Joy
April	23	Terry Rawlings	85	UK	Film Editor	Alien; Blade Runner
April	23	David Winters	80	UK	Actor, Director, Choreographer	West Side Story; Thrashin'
April	24	Jean-Pierre Marielle	87	France	Actor	The Da Vinci Code; Coup de Torchon
April	26	Jessie Lawrence Ferguson	76	US	Actor	Boyz n the Hood; Darkman
April	28	John Singleton	51	US	Director, Screenwriter	Boyz n the Hood; 2 Fast 2 Furious
April	29	George Litto	88	US	Producer	Obsession; Dressed to Kill
April	30	Anémone	68	France	Actress	Death in a French Garden; Little Nicholas
April	30	Peter Mayhew	74	UK	Actor	Star Wars; The Empire Strikes Back
May	1	Alessandra Panaro	79	Italy	Actress	Rocco and His Brothers; Poveri ma belli
May	2	Chris Reccardi	54	US	Animator	The Lego Movie; Shark Tale
May	5	Barbara Perry	97	US	Actress	Trancers; Father of the Bride
May	9	Allene Roberts	90	US	Actress	The Red House; Knock on Any Door
May	9	Alvin Sargent	92	US	Screenwriter	Paper Moon; Ordinary People
May	11	Jean-Claude Brisseau	74	France	Director, Screenwriter	Secret Things; L'ange noir
May	11	Peggy Lipton	72	US	Actress	Twin Peaks: Fire Walk with Me; When in Rome
May	12	Machiko Kyō	95	Japan	Actress	Rashomon; Ugetsu
May	13	Doris Day	97	US	Actress, Singer	Pillow Talk; The Man Who Knew Too Much
May	14	Tim Conway	85	US	Actor	The Apple Dumpling Gang; The Shaggy D.A.
May	17	Rallapalli	73	India	Actor	Jeevana Jyothi; Kalisundam Raa
May	18	Analía Gadé	87	Argentina	Actress	Emergency Ward; Yesterday Was Spring
May	28	Carmine Caridi	85	US	Actor	The Godfather Part II; Bugsy
May	29	Peggy Stewart	95	US	Actress	The Tiger Woman; That's My Boy
June	2	Alistair Browning	65	New Zealand	Actor	The Lord of the Rings; Rain
June	7	Narciso Ibáñez Serrador	83	Spain	Director, Screenwriter	The House That Screamed; Who Can Kill a Child?
June	9	Ma Ju-lung	80	Taiwan	Actor	Cape No. 7; Half a Loaf of Kung Fu
June	9	William D. Wittliff	79	US	Screenwriter	Legends of the Fall; The Perfect Storm
June	11	Valeria Valeri	97	Italy	Actress	Catherine and I; Seasons of Our Love
June	12	Sylvia Miles	94	US	Actress	Midnight Cowboy; Farewell, My Lovely
June	13	Edith González	54	Mexico	Actress	Guyana: Crime of the Century; Señorita Justice
June	13	Sean McCann	83	Canada	Actor	Tommy Boy; Miracle
June	15	Franco Zeffirelli	96	Italy	Director, Screenwriter	Romeo and Juliet; La Traviata
June	20	Eddie Garcia	90	Philippines	Actor	Beast of the Yellow Night; The Woman Hunt
June	21	William Simons	78	UK	Actor	Where No Vultures Fly; West of Zanzibar
June	24	Billy Drago	73	US	Actor	The Untouchables; Pale Rider
June	25	Bruno de Keyzer	69	France	Cinematographer	Round Midnight; A Sunday in the Country
June	25	Bryan Marshall	81	UK	Actor	The Spy Who Loved Me; The Long Good Friday
June	26	Édith Scob	81	France	Actress	Eyes Without a Face; Judex
June	26	Max Wright	75	US	Actor	All That Jazz; Reds
June	27	Ben Barenholtz	83	Poland	Producer, Executive	Requiem for a Dream; Miller's Crossing
June	27	Vijaya Nirmala	73	India	Director, Actor	Alluri Seetarama Raju; Mosagallaku Mosagadu
June	28	Paul Benjamin	81	US	Actor	Do the Right Thing; Escape from Alcatraz
June	29	Jeon Mi-seon	48	South Korea	Actress	Mother; Memories of Murder
June	30	Glyn Houston	93	UK	Actor	The Sleeping Tiger; Solo for Sparrow
July	1	Ennio Guarnieri	88	Italy	Cinematographer	The Garden of the Finzi-Continis; La Traviata
July	1	Sid Ramin	100	US	Composer, Arranger	West Side Story; Too Many Thieves
July	2	Pat Crawford Brown	90	US	Actress	Sister Act; Daredevil
July	3	Arte Johnson	90	US	Actor	The President's Analyst; Love at First Bite
July	4	Eduardo Fajardo	94	Spain	Actor	Django; Compañeros
July	4	Arturo Fernández	90	Spain	Actor	Road to Rocío; House of Evil
July	5	Ugo Gregoretti	88	Italy	Director, Actor	Ro.Go.Pa.G.; It's Happening Tomorrow
July	5	Pierre Lhomme	89	France	Cinematographer	Camille Claudel; Cyrano de Bergerac
July	6	Cameron Boyce	20	US	Actor	Grown Ups; Mirrors
July	6	Eddie Jones	84	US	Actor	Seabiscuit; The Rocketeer
July	7	Artur Brauner	100	Germany	Producer	The Garden of the Finzi-Continis; Europa Europa
July	9	Freddie Jones	91	UK	Actor	The Elephant Man; Krull
July	9	Rip Torn	88	US	Actor	Cross Creek; Men in Black
July	10	Valentina Cortese	96	Italy	Actress	Day for Night; The Barefoot Contessa
July	10	Denise Nickerson	62	US	Actress	Willy Wonka & the Chocolate Factory; Smile
July	13	Richard Carter	65	Australia	Actor	Mad Max: Fury Road; The Great Gatsby
July	13	Stephen Verona	78	Director	Director	The Lords of Flatbush; Boardwalk
July	18	David Hedison	92	US	Actor	The Enemy Below; The Fly
July	19	Rutger Hauer	75	Netherlands	Actor	Blade Runner; Ladyhawke
July	19	Jeremy Kemp	84	UK	Actor	Top Secret!; A Bridge Too Far
July	20	Ilaria Occhini	85	Italy	Actress	Loose Cannons; Un uomo a metà
July	25	Giorgio Arlorio	90	Italy	Screenwriter	Burn!; The Mercenary
July	26	Russi Taylor	75	US	Voice Actress	Who Framed Roger Rabbit; Babe
July	27	Edward Lewis	99	US	Producer	Spartacus; Missing
July	28	George Hilton	85	Uruguay	Actor	All the Colors of the Dark; The Two Faces of Fear
July	31	Raffaele Pisu	94	Italy	Actor	The Consequences of Love; Weekend, Italian Style
July	31	Harold Prince	91	US	Director, Producer	A Little Night Music; Damn Yankees
August	1	D. A. Pennebaker	94	US	Documentarian	Dont Look Back; The War Room
August	1	Barrington Pheloung	65	Australia	Composer	The Mangler; Hilary and Jackie
August	8	Jean-Pierre Mocky	86	France	Director, Actor, Screenwriter	Bonsoir; Agent trouble
August	10	Piero Tosi	92	Italy	Costume Designer	The Leopard; Death in Venice
August	11	Gordan Mihić	80	Serbia	Screenwriter	Time of the Gypsies; Black Cat, White Cat
August	16	Peter Fonda	79	US	Actor, Screenwriter, Director	Easy Rider; Ulee's Gold
August	16	Anna Quayle	86	UK	Actress	Casino Royale; Chitty Chitty Bang Bang
August	16	Richard Williams	86	Canada	Animator, Director	Who Framed Roger Rabbit; The Thief and the Cobbler
August	18	Encarna Paso	88	Spain	Actress	Begin the Beguine; Sesión continua
August	19	James R. Alexander	88	US	Sound Engineer	Coal Miner's Daughter; Terms of Endearment
August	23	Carlo Delle Piane	83	Italy	Actor	Christmas Present; Cops and Robbers
August	25	Mona Lisa	97	Philippines	Actress	Insiang; Giliw Ko
August	28	Michel Aumont	82	France	Actor	A Sunday in the Country; Ruby & Quentin
August	30	Valerie Harper	80	US	Actress	Chapter Two; Blame It on Rio
September	3	Carol Lynley	77	US	Actress	The Poseidon Adventure; The Cardinal
September	7	Robert Axelrod	70	US	Actor	The Blob; Mighty Morphin Power Rangers: The Movie
September	8	John Wesley	72	US	Actor	Missing in Action 2: The Beginning; Stop! Or My Mom Will Shoot
September	11	Mardik Martin	82	US	Screenwriter	Raging Bull; New York, New York
September	15	David Hurst	93	Germany	Actor	Hello, Dolly!; The Boys from Brazil
September	15	Phyllis Newman	86	US	Actress	The Human Stain; Bye Bye Braverman
September	19	Charles Gérard	92	France	Actor	And Now My Love; A Man and a Woman: 20 Years Later
September	20	Jan Merlin	94	US	Actor	Take the Money and Run; The St. Valentine's Day Massacre
September	21	Sid Haig	80	US	Actor	House of 1000 Corpses; Foxy Brown
September	22	Boriss Teterevs	63	Latvia	Producer	Machete Kills; Sin City: A Dame to Kill For
September	25	Venu Madhav	39 or 50	India	Actor	Tholi Prema; Sye
September	27	Rob Garrison	59	US	Actor	The Karate Kid; Iron Eagle
September	28	Mark Zakharov	85	Russia	Director, Screenwriter	An Ordinary Miracle; To Kill a Dragon
September	30	Marshall Efron	81	US	Actor	THX 1138; Bang the Drum Slowly
September	30	Wayne Fitzgerald	89	US	Title Designer	Apocalypse Now; Bonnie and Clyde
October	1	Eric Pleskow	95	Austria	Studio Executive	Beyond Rangoon; The Hollywood Sign
October	2	Paul LeBlanc	73	Canada	Hairstylist	Amadeus; Black Swan
October	4	Diahann Carroll	84	US	Actress, Singer	Paris Blues; Claudine
October	4	Stephen Moore	81	UK	Actor	A Bridge Too Far; The Boat That Rocked
October	5	Dolores Dorn	85	US	Actress	The Bounty Hunter; Underworld U.S.A.
October	6	Vlasta Chramostová	92	Czech Republic	Actress	The Cremator; The Cassandra Cat
October	6	Rip Taylor	88	US	Actor	Indecent Proposal; Wayne's World 2
October	8	Ryan Nicholson	47	Canada	Makeup Artist, Director	Final Destination; Scary Movie
October	9	John W. Corso	89	US	Production Designer	Coal Miner's Daughter; Ferris Bueller's Day Off
October	10	Marie-José Nat	79	France	Actress	Train of Life; Violins at the Ball
October	11	Robert Forster	78	US	Actor	Jackie Brown; The Black Hole
October	17	Zev Braun	90	US	Producer	The Little Girl Who Lives Down the Lane; The Pedestrian
October	17	Bill Macy	97	US	Actor	The Jerk; My Favorite Year
October	17	Victor Mohica	86	US	Actor	The Final Countdown; Blood In Blood Out
October	22	Raymond Leppard	92	UK	Composer	Lord of the Flies; Alfred the Great
October	26	Robert Evans	89	US	Producer, Executive	Chinatown; Marathon Man
October	26	Pascale Roberts	89	France	Actress	The Sleeping Car Murders; Three Men to Kill
October	28	Annick Alane	94	France	Actress	Germinal; Parking
October	29	John Witherspoon	77	US	Actor	Friday; Vampire in Brooklyn
October	30	Bernard Slade	89	Canada	Screenwriter	Same Time, Next Year; Tribute
October	31	Florence Giorgetti	75	France	Actress	La Grande Bouffe; The Lacemaker
November	2	Marie Laforêt	80	France	Actress, Singer	Jack of Diamonds; Male Hunt
November	2	Brian Tarantina	60	US	Actor	Donnie Brasco; BlacKkKlansman
November	4	Virginia Leith	94	US	Actress	The Brain That Wouldn't Die; A Kiss Before Dying
November	5	Omero Antonutti	84	Italy	Actor	Padre Padrone; The Night of the Shooting Stars
November	7	Nik Powell	69	UK	Producer	Mona Lisa; The Crying Game
November	8	Fred Bongusto	84	Italy	Composer	Come Have Coffee with Us; Lovers and Other Relatives
November	10	Lawrence G. Paull	81	US	Production Designer	Blade Runner; Back to the Future
November	13	Arthur Marks	92	US	Director	Detroit 9000; Friday Foster
November	13	Niall Tóibín	89	Ireland	Actor	Flight of the Doves; Far and Away
November	14	Branko Lustig	87	Croatia	Producer	Schindler's List; Gladiator
November	15	Jorge Vergara	64	Mexico	Producer	Y Tu Mamá También; The Assassination of Richard Nixon
November	16	Vojtěch Jasný	93	Czech Republic	Director	All My Good Countrymen; The Cassandra Cat
November	18	Laure Killing	60	France	Actress	Beyond Therapy; The Teddy Bear
November	20	Michael J. Pollard	80	US	Actor	Bonnie and Clyde; Tango & Cash
November	24	Joan Staley	79	US	Actress	The Ghost and Mr. Chicken; Cape Fear
November	27	Godfrey Gao	35	Taiwan	Actor	The Mortal Instruments: City of Bones; The Jade Pendant
November	28	Gene Warren Jr.	78	US	Visual Effects Artist	Terminator 2: Judgment Day; Bram Stoker's Dracula
December	1	Michael Lai	73	Hong Kong	Composer	Police Story; Miracles
December	1	Shelley Morrison	83	US	Actress	Breezy; Fools Rush In
December	4	Leonard Goldberg	85	US	Producer	WarGames; Charlie's Angels
December	5	Robert Walker	79	US	Actor	Beware! The Blob; Easy Rider
December	6	Ron Leibman	82	US	Actor	Norma Rae; Rhinestone
December	6	Natalie Trundy	79	US	Actress	Beneath the Planet of the Apes; The Careless Years
December	8	René Auberjonois	79	US	Actor	MASH; The Patriot
December	8	Caroll Spinney	85	US	Puppeteer	Follow That Bird; The Adventures of Elmo in Grouchland
December	12	Danny Aiello	86	US	Actor	Do the Right Thing; Léon: The Professional
December	12	Gollapudi Maruti Rao	80	India	Actor, Screenwriter	Intlo Ramayya Veedhilo Krishnayya; Swathi Muthyam
December	14	John Briley	94	US	Screenwriter	Gandhi; Cry Freedom
December	14	Anna Karina	79	Denmark	Actress	Pierrot le Fou; Alphaville
December	15	Nicky Henson	74	UK	Actor	Syriana; Penny Gold
December	16	Peter Larkin	93	US	Production Designer	Tootsie; Get Shorty
December	18	Claudine Auger	78	France	Actress	Thunderball; A Bay of Blood
December	22	Tony Britton	95	UK	Actor	Sunday Bloody Sunday; The Day of the Jackal
December	23	David Foster	90	US	Producer	The Thing; The Mask of Zorro
December	25	Lee Mendelson	86	US	Producer	A Boy Named Charlie Brown; Snoopy Come Home
December	26	Jerry Herman	88	US	Composer, Lyricist	Hello, Dolly!; Mame
December	26	Sue Lyon	73	US	Actress	Lolita; The Night of the Iguana
December	27	Jack Sheldon	88	US	Singer, Actor	For the Boys; Radioland Murders
December	29	Neil Innes	75	UK	Composer, Actor	Monty Python and the Holy Grail; Monty Python's Life of Brian
December	30	Jan Fedder	64	Germany	Actor	Das Boot; Soul Kitchen
December	30	Jack Garfein	89	US	Director	Something Wild; The Strange One
December	30	Syd Mead	86	US	Concept Artist	Blade Runner; Aliens
December	30	Elizabeth Sellars	98	UK	Actress	The Barefoot Contessa; The Long Memory

== Film debuts ==
- Ryan Kiera Armstrong – The Art of Racing in the Rain
- Millie Bobby Brown – Godzilla: King of the Monsters
- Ravi Cabot-Conyers – Ode to Joy
- Grantham Coleman – Seberg
- Caylee Cowan – Sunrise in Heaven
- Austin Crute – Booksmart
- Chloe East – Next Level
- Julia Fox – Uncut Gems
- Mason Gooding – Booksmart
- Tom Mercier – Synonyms
- Nico Parker – Dumbo
- Himesh Patel – Yesterday
- Victoria Pedretti – Once Upon a Time in Hollywood
- Lexi Rabe – Avengers: Endgame
- Zoha Rahman – Mr. Majnu
- Hadley Robinson – Little Women
- Nacho Sánchez – Seventeen
- Eliza Scanlen – Babyteeth
- Diana Silvers – Glass
- Harry Trevaldwyn – The King
- Bowen Yang – Isn't It Romantic
