= Rocco Basile =

American philanthropist (died 2022)

- Born: 1968; New York City, New York, U.S.
- Died: March 2022 (aged 53–54); New York City, New York, U.S.
- Education: New York University
- Occupations: Real estate developer; philanthropist
- Known for: Founder of Avo Construction
- Spouse: Missy Basile
- Children: 2

Rocco Basile (1968–2022) was an American real estate developer and philanthropist. He was the founder of Avo Construction, a construction development firm based in Tribeca, New York City, and served for several years as chair of the board of the Brooklyn-based nonprofit, Children of the City.

== Early life and education ==
Basile was born in New York City. He graduated with honors from Xaverian High School in Bay Ridge, Brooklyn, in 1986, and earned a bachelor's degree in accounting and finance from New York University in 1990.

== Career ==
A second-generation New York real estate developer, Basile began his career at Basile Builders Group, a family-owned real estate development firm. By 2011, the firm had built more than thirty buildings in the New York City area. He later founded Avo Construction as a successor to Basile Builders Group.

== Philanthropy ==
Basile served on the board of directors of Children of the City, a nonprofit based in Sunset Park, Brooklyn. He was a member of the board for seven years and chaired it for the final four of those. In 2008, the organization recognized him as a "Children's Champion" alongside former New York Giants player David Tyree.

In addition to his work with Children of the City, Basile raised funds for children with special needs through the Joe DiMaggio Committee at Xaverian High School, supported ComALERT, a Kings County District Attorney's office program to help parolees re-enter the workforce and society, and worked with Safe Horizon, a victim assistance organization for survivors of domestic violence.

Basile was also one of the founding board members of The Arthur Project, a Bronx-based therapeutic mentoring nonprofit serving middle-school students.

== Personal life ==
Basile was married to Missy Basile and had two daughters, Ava and Olivia, for whom Avo Construction was named.

== Award and recognition ==
On April 28, 2011, Basile received the Man of the Year Award from Reaching-Out Community Services at the organization's annual dinner and gala at Rex Manor in Brooklyn. The same year, the New York State Senate adopted Legislative Resolution J1250, sponsored by State Senator Martin J. Golden, honoring Basile for his community service in Southwest Brooklyn and his work with Children of the City.
