= Tender Fictions =

- Directed by: Barbara Hammer
- Starring: Barbara Hammer
- Cinematography: Amy C. Halpern; Barbara Hammer
- Edited by: Barbara Hammer
- Music by: Catherine Jauniaux; Monika; Pamela Z
- Release date: 1996
- Running time: 58 minutes
- Country: United States
- Language: English

Tender Fictions is a 1996 autobiographical documentary film directed by American experimental filmmaker Barbara Hammer. It is the second of a trilogy of documentary films that includes Nitrate Kisses and History Lessons. Together, the three films are sometimes known as the "History trilogy". Tender Fictions details Hammer's life and her attempts to "construct" a self. The film was nominated for a prize at the 1996 Sundance Film Festival.

== Background ==
At the end of Hammer's 1992 experimental documentary film Nitrate Kisses, writer Joan Nestle urges the viewer to preserve and document lesbian history for future generations. Hammer decided to create an autobiography, "before someone [did] it for [her]." The intention of Nitrate Kisses had been to explore the "making" of history, and who it is made by, with a particular emphasis on the "lost" history of lesbians and gay men. In making Tender Fictions, Hammer extended the ideas from Nitrate Kisses, and focused them on the nature of the autobiography. Her 2000 film History Lessons rounded off a trilogy of films about LGBT history that is called her "History trilogy".

== Content ==
The film contains a collage of old home movies, photographs, interviews, sounds and quotations. It details Hammer's childhood as a young girl born into a Ukrainian family, with a mother who wanted her to be like child actress Shirley Temple, and a grandmother who worked as a cook for actress Lillian Gish. It chronicles her life in the 1960s and the moment in 1970 when she first heard the word lesbian, and realized that it applied to her.

According to Hammer, and to film academic Gwendolyn Audrey Foster, a central theme of Tender Fictions is the "constructedness" of biographies and autobiographies and, by extension, the self. To find her sense of self, Hammer explores the lives and works of artists including D. W. Griffith, Charlie Chaplin and Shirley Temple. In the film, she says "I invented myself as an artist by reading autobiographies of famous artists, poets, painters. None of these were by or about lesbians".

== Release and reception ==
Tender Fictions was screened at the 1996 Sundance Film Festival and was nominated for the Grand Jury Prize. It also played at the Berlin International Film Festival, the Ann Arbor Film Festival, the Charlotte Film and Video Festival and the Yamagata International Documentary Film Festival.

Writing for Variety, Emanuel Levy called the film "a frustrating experience". He said that parts were interesting but there was "too much narration" and that ultimately the film was "exhausting and not much fun to watch." He also said that it was "best suited for gay and lesbian festivals."
