= Gold baton award =

Gold baton award may refer to:

- Alfred I. duPont-Columbia University Award
- An award bestowed by the League of American Orchestras
