= Florrie R. Burke =

American human rights advocate

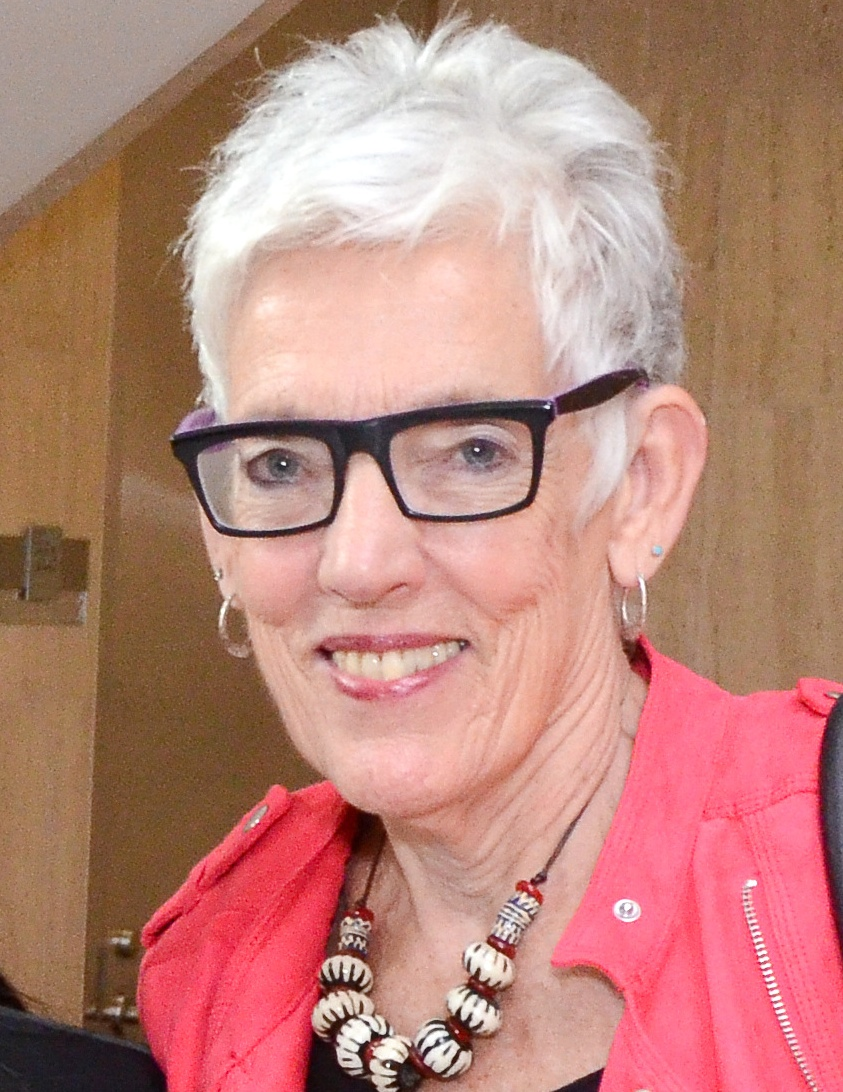
- Florrie Burke, 2013
- Occupation: Human rights advocate specializing in combating human trafficking
- Years active: 1997–present
- Partner: Barbara Hammer (d.2019)
- Awards: National Crime Victims Recognition Service Award Annual Paul and Sheila Wellstone Award Presidential Award for Extraordinary Efforts to Combat Trafficking in Persons

Florrie R. Burke, M.Ed., MA, LMFT, is an American human rights advocate, specializing in combating human trafficking. She is a consultant on Human Trafficking and Modern Day Slavery to both governmental and non-governmental agencies.

== Activism and Career ==
Burke has worked with trafficked persons since 1997, initially designing specialized social services for sixty deaf Mexicans held in slavery in a peddling ring in New York City. In 2001, she helped establish the Anti-Trafficking Program at Safe Horizon and developed a model for community trauma response following the September 11 attacks.

As Senior Director of Safe Horizon’s Anti-Trafficking Program, Burke has highlighted multiple barriers faced by survivors in seeking assistance, including distrust of law enforcement, fear of retaliation from traffickers who may be respected community members, and stigma within immigrant communities. She has noted that trafficked persons often hesitate to come forward due to concerns about the safety of themselves, their families, and others in their networks. She has described trafficking rings as having extensive “tentacles” sometimes reaching back to victims’ home countries, contributing to survivors' fears for their safety.

== Advocacy and Policy Work ==
In December 2011, Burke testified before the U.S. House Committee on Oversight and Government Reform regarding the need for comprehensive reproductive health services for trafficking survivors, including contraception and abortion. She opposed restrictions imposed on subcontractors of the U.S. Conference of Catholic Bishops’ Migration and Refugee Services (MRS) that prevented referrals for these services due to religious objections.

Burke emphasized that access to reproductive healthcare, including education about sexual health, is vital for trafficking survivors, who are often young, undereducated, and vulnerable to illness and disease.

== Other Contributions ==
Burke is a founding member and Chair Emeritus of the Freedom Network and serves as an advisor to the Freedom Network Training Institute. She is a member of the Global Training Initiative on Human Trafficking at the United Nations Office on Drugs and Crime (UNODC) and a faculty member of the Warnath Group, developing training materials for first responders and criminal justice professionals.

She has been honored by the U.S. Department of Justice’s Civil Rights Division and the Wage and Hour Division of the Department of Labor. In 2013, she received the inaugural Presidential Award for Extraordinary Efforts to Combat Trafficking in Persons from Secretary of State John Kerry. The Award was granted in recognition of “her sustained dedication and unparalleled leadership in combating modern slavery through the development and delivery of comprehensive services, the empowerment of survivors to move from slavery to independence, and the transformation of policy to eradicate all forms of human trafficking".

== Personal life ==
Burke is a lesbian. She was in a long-term relationship with filmmaker Barbara Hammer until Hammer’s death in 2019.

== Awards ==
- National Crime Victims Recognition Service Award
- Annual Paul and Sheila Wellstone Award
- Presidential Award for Extraordinary Efforts to Combat Trafficking in Persons
