= League of American Orchestras =

North American service organization

- Formation: 1942; 84 years ago
- Headquarters: New York City, New York, U.S.
- Location: 520 Eighth Avenue, Suite 2203, New York City, New York, 10018, U.S.
- Website: www.americanorchestras.org
- Formerly called: American Symphony Orchestra League

The League of American Orchestras, formerly the American Symphony Orchestra League, is a North American non-profit arts organization with 700 member orchestras of all budget sizes and types, plus individual and institutional members. Based in New York City, with an office in Washington, DC, the league leads, serves, and advocates for orchestras and the orchestral art form.

== History ==
The league was founded in 1942 and chartered by Congress in 1962. Leta Snow, manager of the Kalamazoo Symphony Orchestra, convened a meeting of representatives from 40 U.S. orchestras in 1942 to discuss ways to improve orchestral music through group action. The league, then known as the American Symphony Orchestra League, was formed shortly thereafter. One of its first actions was to lobby successfully, under the leadership of its executive secretary Helen M. Thompson, for the repeal of a federal tax on symphony concert tickets.

In 1994, the American Symphony Orchestra League reported that 174 women had upper-level conducting positions with more than 850 orchestras across the US.

In April 2018, along with the Sphinx Organization and the New World Symphony, the League of American Orchestras announced the establishment of the National Alliance for Audition Support (NAAS) that prepares more black and Latino musicians to enter and succeed in auditions for orchestras. The NAAS was launched with a $2 million fund.

== Activities ==
The league provides resources for ongoing professional development. The league provides resources in its career center, including sections on seeking career guidance, finding jobs and internships, league programs and resources, and who works in orchestras and what they do.

Communication to members and representing the drive of the league is presented through several sources, including newsletters and an award-winning magazine, Symphony.

Besides the league's national conference, the organization provides other meetings at the national, regional, and local level.

The league is devoted to increasing the awareness of and access to orchestral music. By representing orchestras before Congress, the organization acts on legislative policies.

=== Youth and education ===
The league recognizes the importance of music education in growing, promoting, and sustaining American orchestras. It provides information regarding El Sistema and Ann and Gordon Getty Foundation grants and the development of American youth orchestras. It has created and maintained an entire division of its operation to youth orchestras, including directors from across the country. This division, the Youth Orchestra Division or YOD, has its own separate leadership, including individuals working in music education and youth orchestra development. In addition, League CEO, Jesse Rosen, and vice president for advocacy, Heather Noonan, composed a resource in advocacy for music education entitled "Enough" Is Not Enough. Within this writing, Rosen and Noonan present the current picture of music education in the United States, where although the arts are considered a core subject by federal law, they do not receive this treatment in American schools. They also claim those students who could be influenced the most by a health arts education, especially music, do not have reliable access to such an education in the arts.

=== Innovation and community engagement ===
Announced in 2016, the league's Futures Fund is underwritten by the Ann and Gordon Getty Foundation to advance a wide variety of innovative orchestral engagement initiatives. In 2019 there are nineteen grants from this $4.5 million program, whose variety is illustrated by a joint Toledo Symphony Orchestra and University of Toledo effort to study the effects of classical music as a component of psychotherapy, an innovative variety of digital subscription initiatives aimed at audience growth for the Cleveland Orchestra and planned presentation of three concerts by the Virginia Symphony Orchestra designed to celebrate and support neurodiversity.

== Programs ==
=== Essentials of Orchestra Management ===
The league has offered courses in orchestra management since 1952 and orchestra management fellowships began in 1980. The Essentials of Orchestra Management program was offered starting in 2000. These ten-day-long seminars are offered annually in partnership with Julliard Extension. Their purpose is to provide leadership development to early- and mid-career orchestra and arts professionals, including emphasis on orchestra governance, artistic leadership, financial and strategic planning, DEI, community engagement, marketing, and communications. As of 2025, over 600 people have participated in the program.

== Gold Baton award ==
Created in 1948 and given annually since 1958, the Gold Baton is the league's highest honor. A broad range of recipients of have been honored for supporting and inspiring the growth of symphonic music on a broad level. The most-recent five awardees include a philanthropist, an arts administrator, instrumentalists and a composer.

- 2019 Joan Tower
- 2018 Yo-Yo Ma
- 2017 Ann Hobson Pilot
- 2016 Kris Sinclair
- 2015 Anne-Marie Soullière
- 2014 Wayne S. Brown
- 2013 Don Randel
- 2012 Helen J. DeVos
- 2011 Fred Zenone, American Public Media and Minnesota Public Radio
- 2010 Ford Motor Company Fund, Nation's Smaller-Budget Orchestras
- 2009 Henry Fogel
- 2008 America's youth orchestras
- 2007 Kenneth Schermerhorn
- 2006 John Williams
- 2005 Leonard Slatkin, The National Arts Caucus
- 2004 Walter Anderson, Seymour Rosen
- 2003 Michael Tilson Thomas, Gordon Getty
- 2002 Paul R. Judy
- 2001 Adolph Herseth
- 2000 Pierre Boulez
- 1999 Peter Pastreich
- 1998 Ernest Fleischmann
- 1997 Catherine French
- 1996 Audrey Baird
- 1995 Corporation for Public Broadcasting
- 1994 Josef Gingold
- 1993 New York Philharmonic
- 1992 Meet the Composer
- 1991 Robert Ward
- 1990 Carnegie Hall
- 1989 Ralph Black
- 1988 Robert Shaw
- 1987 Isaac Stern, Betty Freeman
- 1986 Margaret Lee Crofts, Paul Fromm, and Francis Goelet
- 1985 William Schuman
- 1984 Danny Newman, Merrill Lynch
- 1983 Morton Gould
- 1982 Sidney R. Yates
- 1981 Maurice Abravanel
- 1980 Beverly Sills, The Minnesota Five Percent Club
- 1979 Eugene Ormandy, The Bell System
- 1978 Aaron Copland, Exxon Corporation
- 1977 Avery Fisher, Alcoa Foundation
- 1976 Arthur Fiedler
- 1975 John S. Edwards
- 1974 Nancy Hanks and the National Council on the Arts
- 1973 Danny Kaye
- 1972 Amyas Ames
- 1971 Martha Baird Rockefeller
- 1970 Helen M. Thompson
- 1969 The New York State Council on the Arts
- 1968 Leopold Stokowski, Mrs. Jouett Shouse
- 1967 American Telephone & Telegraph Company
- 1966 The Ford Foundation
- 1965 American Federation of Musicians
- 1964 Dr. Richard Lert, Paul Mellon, A.W. Mellon Educational and Charitable Trusts, Richard King Mellon Charitable Trust, Howard Heinz Endowment
- 1963 John D. Rockefeller, III
- 1962 The Women's Associations of Symphony Orchestras in the United States and Canada
- 1961 Arthur Judson
- 1960 Charles Farnsley
- 1959 Leonard Bernstein
- 1958 The Study Committee on Orchestra Legal Documents: Samuel Rosenbaum, Henry B. Cabot, Dudley T. Easby, Jr., Charles Garside, and Henry Allen Moe
- 1956 Mrs. Marjorie Merriweather Post
- 1952 John B. Ford
- 1948 Ernest La Prade

== Governance ==
=== Board officers ===
Officers for 2019–2020 are:

- Douglas M. Hagerman, chair
- Melanie Clarke, co-vice chair
- Steven C. Parrish, co-vice chair
- Helen Shaffer, secretary
- Burton Alter, treasurer

=== Executive ===
Since 2020, the president and CEO of the league has been Simon Woods, former CEO of the Los Angeles Philharmonic and, from 2011 to 2017, of the Seattle Symphony. Jesse Rosen held this position for 12 years, after 10 years of earlier service to the league.

== See also ==
- List of symphony orchestras in the United States
- List of youth orchestras in the United States
