= Steven C. Parrish =

American lawyer, executive and consultant (born 1950)

- Born: April 13, 1950 (age 76)
- Occupations: Executive consultant, lawyer, community volunteer
- Employer(s): Steve Parrish Consulting Group, LLC
- Known for: Former Senior Vice President for Corporate Affairs at Altria Group, support for FDA regulation of tobacco
- Board member of: Safe Horizon (Chair); Stamford Symphony<bt>Tony La Russa's Animal Rescue Foundation; Carleton College, League of American Orchestras

Steven C. Parrish (born April 13, 1950) is a C-Suite executive consultant, American lawyer, Chair Safe Horizon, and community volunteer. Until 2008, he was an executive for Altria Group Inc. (formerly Philip Morris Companies, Inc.) where he was a Senior Vice President for Corporate Affairs.

For more than a decade, Steve Parrish supported proposals to grant the Federal Food and Drug Administration (FDA) authority to regulate the tobacco industry. His efforts were documented in network news broadcasts and national publications, including ABC's "Peter Jennings Reporting from the Tobacco File," a New York Times Magazine cover story "If It's Good for Philip Morris, Can It Also Be Good for Public Health?" and the national best-seller, A Question of Intent by former FDA Chairman Dr. David Kessler. After the passage of the landmark bill granting FDA regulatory authority over the tobacco industry, a 2009 New York Times article quoted Parrish as congratulating Dr. Kessler. "Congratulations on the Senate vote today," he wrote. Truly historic and it WILL save lives. You were a pioneer; I only wish I had been there with you in the beginning. Better late than never, I guess." To which Dr. Kessler replied, "Congratulations to you - you were key."

From 1994 to 2008, Parrish led Altria's government relations, communications issues management, corporate philanthropy and corporate compliance. As senior vice president of Altria, Parrish headed the corporation's communications with a range of stakeholders, including public health organizations, civic groups, the media and government. He addressed organizations, including the U.S. Hispanic Chamber of Commerce, the National Center on Addiction and Substance Abuse, The Conference Board and World Presidents Organization. He has appeared on numerous news programs such as Face the Nation, Meet the Press, Nightline, and The News Hour on PBS.

Prior to joining Philip Morris in 1990 as Vice President and General Counsel, Philip Morris USA, Parrish was a partner at the law firm of Shook, Hardy and Bacon in Kansas City, MO.

== Current ==
After his retirement from Altria in 2008, Parrish founded Steve Parrish Consulting Group, LLC specializing in crisis management, corporate social responsibility, public affairs and communication for senior executives of corporations, law firms, and nonprofit organizations. He has also served as is board chair of Safe Horizon, the nation's leading provider of support for victims of crime and abuse, particularly domestic violence, sexual assault, child abuse and human trafficking. In 2018, Spectrum News NY1 named Parrish “New Yorker of the Week” for his efforts to assist victims of domestic violence. He also serves on the boards of the Stamford Symphony, Tony La Russa's Animal Rescue Foundation, Carleton College Board of Trustees and the League of American Orchestras.

== See also ==
- Tobacco in the United States

== External Sources ==
- Safe Horizon
- Stamford Symphony
- Tony La Russa's Animal Rescue Foundation
- League of American Orchestras
- Carleton College
