= Ann Arbor Film Festival =

Film festival in Michigan, United States

Coordinates: 42.28299°N 83.75113°W

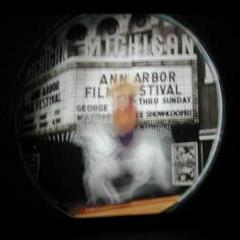
- Opening animation during the 43rd fest
- Location: Ann Arbor, Michigan, United States
- Language: International
- Website: http://www.aafilmfest.org

The Ann Arbor Film Festival is an annual Oscar-qualifying film festival held in Ann Arbor, Michigan. Established in 1963, it is the fourth-oldest film festival in North America (after the Yorkton Film Festival, 1947; Columbus International Film & Video Festival, 1953; and the San Francisco International Film Festival, 1957) and the oldest experimental film festival. It has become one of the premier film festivals for independent and, especially, experimental filmmakers to showcase their work. The Ann Arbor Film Festival attracts over 3,000 entries from filmmakers in more than 60 countries, and distributes over $20,000 in cash awards. As an early example of the traveling festival concept beginning in 1964, each year the Ann Arbor Film Festival Tour presents a collection of short films at more than 30 art house theaters, universities, galleries and cinematheques throughout the world.

Created as an alternative to commercial cinema, the annual week-long festival focuses on promoting film as an art form. The Ann Arbor Film Festival also fosters the growth of emerging and established film and video makers. The festival is open to film and video of all lengths and genres, including experimental, narrative, animation, documentary, and genre hybrids.

== History ==
The Ann Arbor Film Festival was founded in 1963 by University of Michigan professor George Manupelli. Manupelli originally screened only films in the 16 mm format, and thus the festival was called the 16 mm Film Festival. The festival gained prominence quickly, as it was one of the few outlets for experimental filmmakers to screen their work. In 1980 the festival moved from Lorch Hall on the University of Michigan campus to the Michigan Theater, an Ann Arbor landmark with a seating capacity of 1,600. In 1983, after becoming independent from the University of Michigan, the festival became a 501(c)(3) not-for-profit organization. In 2003 the festival began accepting entries in digital formats, opening up the festival to more filmmakers. In 2007 the festival was named one of Variety magazine's "Top Ten Festivals We Love." In 2020, due to the COVID-19 pandemic, the festival moved to streaming online for free, rather than showing at the Michigan Theater.

Since its inception, thousands of influential filmmakers and artists have showcased early work at the AAFF, including Kenneth Anger, Agnès Varda, Andy Warhol, Yoko Ono, Gus Van Sant, Barbara Hammer, The Coen Brothers, Lawrence Kasdan, Devo and George Lucas.
