= Barbara Hammer =

American filmmaker (1939–2019)

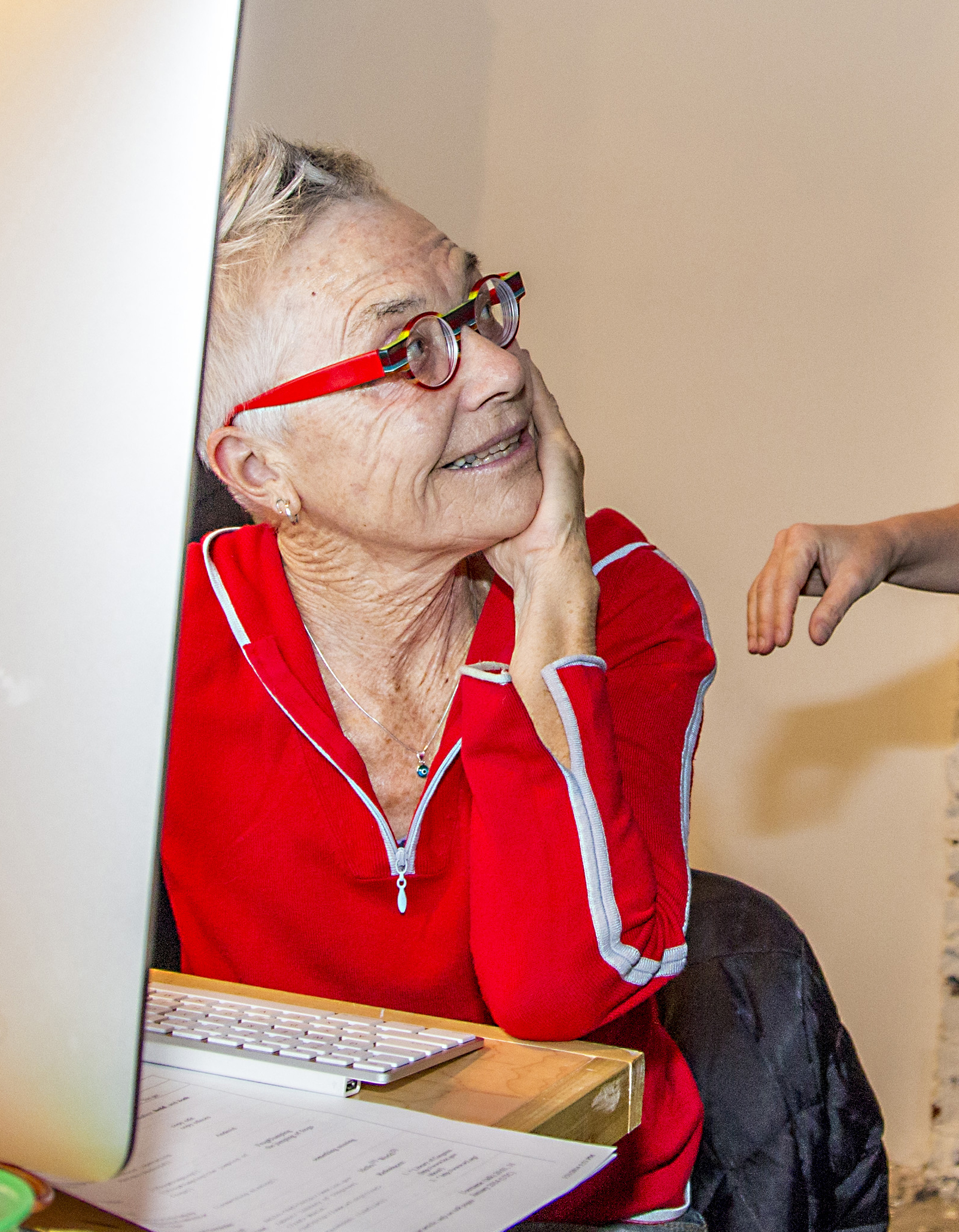
- Hammer at the 2014 Art+Feminism Wikipedia Editathon
- Born: Barbara Jean Hammer; May 15, 1939; Los Angeles, California, U.S.
- Died: March 16, 2019 (aged 79); New York City, U.S.
- Occupation: Filmmaker
- Years active: 1968–2019
- Spouse: Florrie R. Burke
- Website: Official website

Barbara Jean Hammer (May 15, 1939 – March 16, 2019) was an American feminist film director, producer, writer, and cinematographer. She is known for being one of the pioneers of the lesbian film genre, and her career spanned over 50 years. Hammer is known for having created experimental films dealing with women's issues such as gender roles, lesbian relationships, coping with aging, and family life. She resided in New York City and Kerhonkson, New York, and taught each summer at the European Graduate School.

== Life ==
Hammer was born on May 15, 1939, in Los Angeles, California, to Marian (Kusz) and John Wilber Hammer, and grew up in Inglewood. She became familiar with the film industry from a young age, as her mother hoped she would become a child star like Shirley Temple, and her grandmother worked as a live-in cook for American film director D. W. Griffith. Her maternal grandparents were Ukrainian; her grandfather was from Zbarazh. Hammer was raised without religion, but her grandmother was Roman Catholic.

In 1961, Hammer graduated with a bachelor's degree in psychology at the University of California, Los Angeles and married Clayton Henry Ward, on the condition that he take her traveling around the world. She received a master's degree in English literature in 1963. In the early 1970s, she studied film at San Francisco State University, where she first encountered Maya Deren's experimental short film Meshes of the Afternoon (1943), which inspired her to make her own experimental films about her personal life.

In 1974, Hammer was married and teaching at a community college in Santa Rosa. Around this time, she came out as a lesbian, after talking with another student in a feminist group. After leaving her marriage, she "took off on a motorcycle with a Super-8 camera." That year she filmed Dyketactics, widely considered one of the first lesbian films. She graduated with a master's degree in film from San Francisco State University.

In 1992, she released her first feature film, Nitrate Kisses, an experimental documentary about the marginalization of LGBT people in the 20th century. It was nominated for the Grand Jury Prize at the 1993 Sundance Film Festival. It won the Polar Bear Award at the Berlin International Film Festival and the Best Documentary Award at the Internacional de Cine Realizado por Mujeres in Madrid. Conversely, right-wing organizations labeled the film a "homoerotic film abomination." She earned a post-master's in multimedia digital studies at the American Film Institute in 1997. In 2000, she received the Moving Image award from Creative Capital, and in 2013, she was a Guggenheim Fellow.

She received the first Shirley Clarke Avant-Garde Filmmaker Award in October 2006, the Women In Film Award from the St. Louis International Film Festival in 2006, and in 2009, she received the Teddy Award for best short film for her film A Horse Is Not a Metaphor at the Berlin International Film Festival.

In 2010, Hammer published her autobiography, HAMMER! Making Movies Out of Sex and Life, which addresses her personal history and her philosophies on art.

She taught film at The European Graduate School in Saas-Fee, Switzerland. In 2017, the Beinecke Rare Book and Manuscript Library at Yale University acquired her archives.

Hammer's film collection, comprising her originals, prints, outtakes, and other material resides at the Academy Film Archive in Los Angeles, where a project is in progress to restore her complete film output. As of 2020, the archive has preserved nearly twenty of her films, including Multiple Orgasm, Sanctus, Menses, and No No Nooky T.V.

After years of short-term relationships, she married human rights advocate Florrie R. Burke; in 1995, she made Tender Fictions, a film featuring images of Burke. They were partners for thirty-one years, until Hammer's death in 2019.

== Career ==
Hammer's career worked within experimental 16 mm film and video, spanning five decades. Hammer was both innovative and productive. Her topics of work were wide-ranging, from the beauty of the body and love to the discussion of politics and society, and her body of work includes almost 100 films. Throughout her career, Hammer kept challenging herself and exploring new and unfamiliar topics. Her career could be divided into three stages according to her developing focus of work: early career stage (1960s–1970s), mid-career stage (1980s–mid-1990s), and late-career stage (mid-1990s–2018).

=== 1960s–1970s: Early career and cultural feminism ===
Her early films, made during her time at San Francisco State University, focused on female and homosexual topics and embodied the 1970s notion of cultural feminism. During this early stage of Hammer's career, especially in the mid-1970s, her role as the only women filmmaker who openly claimed as a lesbian was widely indicated in her works. Her works during this period were later critiqued as romanticism and essentialism. There are many physical and sexual representations of the female body, emphasizing the idea of expressing love, desire, and erotic pleasure between lesbians openly. Those films aim to illustrate personal and private ideas and beliefs and hope the audience can get physically involved.

Hammer was actively involved in media making industry during this period, including learning new skills and techniques, organizing premieres of her own works, opening film workshops and lessons that are related to women filmmaking, etc.

Notable works from this period:

Dyketactics (1974): Dyketactics is one of the most prominent works in the history of lesbian cinema. It was made during Hammer's time at San Francisco State University. As Hammer talked about in a later interview, one of the reasons for making this film was that there were no lesbian films existing during that time. There are many intimate shots in Dyketactics: women take off their clothes and dance with each other, embrace with nature and touch each other, and there is a love-making sequence, which Hammer is personally involved in. The slow and gentle actions of the women onscreen and the use of superimpositions and careful framing make those erotic scenes romantic and sensual, differentiating this film from pornography in both narrative and visual forms. Through Dyketactics, Hammer presented lesbian love-making which had not been shown in earlier films, and set a milestone in lesbian cinema.

Superdyke (1975): Superdyke is made in the early stage of gay liberation. The film includes many illustrations of the female body, including nudity, self-touching, and masturbating. Hammer's choice of cinematography in Superdyke was noticeable; for example, she used close-up to capture female bodies on the beach in order to emphasize the tactile sensation of the bodies and the surrounding; she panned the camera together with female characters' movements in a dancing scene to create the motive sensation. By doing so, Hammer explores the sensual potential of filmmaking.

Double Strength (1978): Double Strength focuses on Hammer's relationship with trapeze artist Terry Sendgraff. Though this is a film about this couple's relationship, Hammer does not appear much in the camera. Most of the shots record the body of Sendgraff while she is on the trapezes. There are many superimpositions of Sendgraff's body and shadow and interactions between Sendgraff's body and daily items. The visual style and technics of Double Strength are consistent with Hammer's other works during this period.

=== 1980s–mid-1990s: Mid-career and deepened focus ===
Hammer's mid-career films danced between short film and feature-length. This part of her career was staged by her decision to move from California to New York, provoked in part by her desire to remove herself from the social and political environment that had directed her towards the cultural feminism of her early films, which were later so harshly critiqued. Moving from simple representations of bodies which was not recognized as fine art, Hammer's focus shifted to more formal works. She started to explore the relationship between the self and the outside world, including light, life, nature, society, government, etc. With the deepened theme and more elaborate production of her works due to her early efforts, many of her works during this period gained attention from the public.

Notable works from this period:

Bent Time (1984): Bent Time is a travel film recording places from California to Mexico. The abundant uses of wide-angle lenses and stop-motions bend light within the frame to simulate the theoretical bending of time. This film is also Hammer's way of exploring her decision to relocate to New York City, where she remained until her death.

Nitrate Kisses (1992): Nitrate Kisses is produced under the shadow of the AIDS crisis and unveils the marginalization that homosexual people in America have been subjected to since World War I. This film reflects on the neglected or even forgotten past of the lesbian community and other minority groups. Hammer's voice-over commentary and various older lesbians' testimonies are accompanied by shots of desolate scenery and depressed city views, creating a strong sense of incompleteness and precariousness.

=== mid-1990s–2018: Late career and self reflection ===
Hammer's late career coincides with her rise to public prominence with museum retrospectives and her acquisition of a Guggenheim Fellowship. She focused more on identity politics during this period. The theme of wars, health issues, and liberties came to Hammer's attention. She explored the relationship between art and social issues in her works.

Her interest in the body was still an essential part of her works. However, instead of the beauty of bodies, her camera shot more about the body when it is aged, hurt, and moved. This was directly connected to her arduous cancer battle, which began with her diagnosis in 2006.

Notable works from this period:

Tender Fictions (1995): Tender Fictions is an autobiographical film that reflects Hammer's early life experiences and is also a sequel to her well-known documentary film Nitrate Kisses.

History Lessons (2000): History Lessons focuses on the erased lesbian past. With the suppressing history, the historical materials of the lesbian community were hard to find. To solve this problem, Hammer uses many commercial materials, including pornography, pulp fiction, etc. Those footages are juxtaposed with comic intent, making the style of the film relatively light and comedic.

My Babushka: Searching Ukrainian Identities (2001): In My Babushka: Searching Ukrainian Identities, Hammer explores her Ukrainian Identity and focuses on the geography, culture, and history of Ukraine.

A Horse is Not a Metaphor (2009): A Horse is Not a Metaphor is an autobiographical depiction of Hammer's fight with and the remission of her third-stage ovarian cancer.

Evidentiary Bodies (2018): Evidentiary Bodies is Hammer's final piece. It includes a melding of performance, artistic installation, and film, acting as a culmination of her involvement with the right-to-die movement.

== Awards ==
Hammer created more than 80 moving image works throughout her life, and also received a great number of honors.

In 2007, Hammer was honored with an exhibition and tribute at the Chinese Cultural University Digital Imaging Center in Taipei. In 2010, Hammer had a one-month exhibition at the Museum of Modern Art in New York City. Additionally, in 2013, she was granted a Guggenheim Fellowship for her film Waking Up Together. She also had exhibitions at the Tate Modern in London and at the Jeu de Paume in Paris in 2012; for the 2013 Toronto International Film Festival; and at the Koch Oberhuber Woolfe in Berlin in both 2011 and 2014.

Hammer received numerous awards during the span of her career. She was chosen by the Whitney Biennial in 1985, 1989, and 1993, for her films Optic Nerve, Endangered, and Nitrate Kisses, respectively. In 2006, she won both the first ever Shirley Clarke Avant-Garde Filmmaker Award from New York Women in Film and Television and the Women in Film Award from the St. Louis International Film Festival.

In 2008, Hammer received The Leo Award from the Flaherty Film Seminar. Her films Generations and Maya Deren's Sink both won the Teddy Award in 2011 for Best Short Film. Her film A Horse Is Not a Metaphor won the Teddy Award for Best Short Film in 2009; it also won Second Prize at the Black Maria Film Festival. It was also selected for several film festivals: the Torino Gay and Lesbian Film Festival, Punta de Vista Film Festival, the Festival de Films des Femmes Creteil, and the International Women's Film Festival Dortmund/Koln.

A cumulative list of her acquired awards is available below:

- Stan Brakhage Vision Award, Denver Film Society (2018)
- Temple University Films and Media Arts Tribute Award, Philadelphia, PA (2018)
- Selected Master Filmmaker, Robert Flaherty Film Seminar, Claremont, CA (2018)
- Resisting Paradise, Best Documentary, Memphis Film and Video Festival, Memphis, TN (2018)
- Resisting Paradise, Aesthetic Art Award, Asolo Art Film Festival, Asolo, Italy (2018)
- Resisting Paradise, Southern Circuit Tour (screenings in 7 southern cities) (2018)
- Award for Outstanding Contribution to the Arts, Trinity College (2012)
- The Judy Grahn Award for Lesbian Nonfiction (2011)
- The Publishing Triangle Lambda Award for Best Lesbian Memoir Writing (2011)
- LEO Award for Outstanding Contribution to Film, Flaherty Seminars, Leo Dratfield Endowment and International Film Seminars (2008)
- Platinum Tribute, Outfest (2007)
- Shirley Clarke Avant-Garde Film Award, St. Louis International Film Festival, NYWFT (2006)
- Fulbright Senior Specialist, Academy of Fine Arts and Design Bratislava, Slovakia (2005)
- Selected Master Filmmaker, Robert Flaherty Film Seminar, Claremont, CA (2005)
- Resisting Paradise, Southern Circuit Travel Award (2004)
- History Lessons, Documentary Award, Athens International Film/Video Festival (2003)
- Resisting Paradise, Close-up: Visionaries of Modern Cinema Award, Frameline (2003)
- Peace Prize, 1st Global Peace Film Festival (2003)
- Tribute, U.S.A. Film Festival (2003)
- Career Honor from Mayor of Philadelphia, International Gay-Lesbian Film Festival (2001)
- Frameline Award, Career Honor, Frameline International Film Festival (2000)
- Devotion, Jurors' Merit Award, Taiwan International Documentary Film Festival (2000)
- Tender Fictions, Awarded Best Documentary Cash Prize, Immaginaria Festival (1998)
- Tender Fictions, Documentary Competition, Yamagata International Doc Film Festival (1997)
- Tender Fictions, Director's Choice, Charlotte Film Festival (1996)
- Documentary Competition, Sundance Film Festival (1996)
- The Forum, Berlin International Film Festival (1996)
- Isabel Liddell Art Award, Ann Arbor Film Festival (1996)
- Cineprobe, Museum of Modern Art, NYC (1995)
- Nitrate Kisses, Audience Award for Best Documentary, International Festival of Women Directors (1994)
- Polar Bear Award for Lifetime Contribution to Lesbian/Gay Cinema, Berlin International Film Festival (1993)
- Cineprobe, Museum of Modern Art, NYC (1993)
- Vital Signs, Excellence Award, California State Fair (1992)
- Best Experimental Film, Utah Film Festival (1992)
- Juror's Award, Black Maria Film Festival (1992)
- Society for the Encouragement of Contemporary Art Video Award (1992)
- The John D. Phelan Award in Video (1991)
- Sanctus, Special Award, Ann Arbor Film Festival (1991)
- Second Prize, Experimental Film, Baltimore Film Festival (1991)
- Endangered, First Prize, Atlanta Film Festival (1991)
- First Prize, Black Maria Film Festival (1991)
- First Prize, Buck's County Film Festival (1991)
- The Whitney Museum of American Art Biennial (1991)
- Cineprobe, Museum of Modern Art, NYC (1991)
- The Whitney Museum of American Art Biennial (1989)
- Endangered and Optic Nerve (1988)
- The John D. Phelan Award in Film (1988)
- Place Mattes, First Prize Animation, Marin Country Film Festival (1988)
- No No Nooky T.V., Second Prize, Ann Arbor Film Festival (1987)
- First Prize, Humboldt Film Festival (1987)
- Optic Nerve, First Prize, Ann Arbor Film Festival (1986)
- First Prize, Onion City Film Festival (1986)
- Optic Nerve, Cineprobe, Museum of Modern Art, NYC (1985)
- The Whitney Museum of American Art Biennial (1985)

== Style and reception ==
Hammer was an avant-garde filmmaker and focused a large sum of her films on feminist or lesbian topics. Through the use of experimental cinema, Hammer exposed her audiences to feminist theory. Her films, she said, are meant to promote "independence and freedom from social restriction."

Her films were regarded as being controversial because they focused on taboo, feminine topics such as menstruation, the female orgasm, and lesbianism. Hammer experimented with different film gauges in the 1980s, especially with 16mm film, in order to show just how fragile film itself is. One of her most well-known films, Nitrate Kisses, "explores three deviant sexualities – S/M lesbianism, mixed-race gay male lovemaking, and the passions and sexual practices of older lesbians."

Hammer's film Dyketactics (1974) illustrates the importance of the female body to her work, and is shot in two sequences: the first sequence depicts a group of nude women gathering in the countryside to dance, bathe, touch one another, and interact with the environment; in the second sequence, Hammer herself is filmed sharing an intimate moment with another woman within a Bay Area house. Between the two sequences, Hammer aimed to create an erotic film that used different film language than the mainstream, heterosexual erotic films of the time. She called it a "lesbian commercial".

Hammer's early films utilized natural imagery, such as trees and fruit, associating them with the female body. Nitrate Kisses (1992), her longest film to date upon its completion, functions as a commentary on how members of the LGBT community are often left out of history; it simultaneously works to remedy the problem by offering some of this lost history to its viewers.

This style of filmmaking was met with mixed reactions. In a review of Hammer's films Women I Love (1976) and Double Strength (1978), critic Andrea Weiss noted, "It's become fashionable for women's bodies to be represented by pieces of fruit," and criticized Hammer for "adopting the masculine romanticized view of women." According to Michael Schell, "her relentless pursuit of an artistic vision, informed by the American tradition of experimental cinema, whose integrity was personal, not simply political, can pose a challenge to the assumptions of both sub- and mainstream cultures".

== Grants ==
In 2017, the first Barbara Hammer Lesbian Experimental Filmmaking Grant was awarded to Fair Brane.

The San Francisco State University Queer Cinema Project supports queer filmmakers through the annual Barbara Hammer Awards, which grants two SFSU students funding towards the completion of a queer-focused project.

In 2020, filmmaker Lynne Sachs created the Ann Arbor Festival Award, for the creation of a film that best conveys Hammer's celebration of the female experience.

== Feminist and lesbian works impact ==
Through her controversial work, Hammer is considered as a pioneer of queer cinema. Her goal through her film work was to provoke discourse on the marginalized, more specifically, marginalized lesbians. She felt that making films that showed her personal experience around renaming herself as a lesbian would help start the conversation on lesbianism and get people to stop ignoring its existence.

== Illness, right to die activism, and death ==
In 2006, Hammer was diagnosed with stage-three ovarian cancer. After twelve years of chemotherapy, she fought for the right of self-euthanasia. She referenced this in her works, such as her 2009 film A Horse Is Not a Metaphor, in which she expressed the ups and downs of a cancer patient. Through her experience, she became an advocate for the right to die movement and fought for the New York Medical Aid in Dying Act.

On October 10, 2018, Hammer presented "The Art of Dying", a performative lecture at the Whitney Museum of Art.

Hammer died from endometrioid ovarian cancer on March 16, 2019, at the age of 79. She had been receiving palliative hospice care at the time of her death.

== In culture ==
In 2026, New York based filmmaker Brydie O’Connor premiered documentary Barbara Forever, which reveals work, thoughts and philosophy of Barbara Hammer.

== Filmography ==
- Contribution to Light (1968)
- The Baptism (1968)
- White Cassandra (1968)
- Schizy (1968)
- Clay I Love You II (1968–69)
- Aldebaran Sees (1969)
- Barbara Ward Will Never Die (1969)
- Cleansed II (1969)
- Death of a Marriage (1969)
- Elegy (1970)
- Play or 'Yes', 'Yes', 'Yes' (1970)
- Traveling: Marie and Me (1970)
- The Song of the Clinking Cup (1972)
- I Was/I Am (1973)
- Sisters! (1974)
- A Gay Day (1973)
- Yellow Hammer (1973)
- Dyketactics (1974)
- X (1974)
- Women's Rites, or Truth is the Daughter of Time (1974)
- Menses (1974)
- Jane Brakhage (1975)
- Superdyke (1975)
- Psychosynthesis (1975)
- Superdyke Meets Madame X (1975)
- San Diego Women's Music Festival (1975)
- Guatemala Weave (1975)
- Moon Goddess (1975) – with G. Churchman
- Eggs (1972)
- Multiple Orgasm (1976)
- Women I Love (1976)
- Stress Scars and Pleasure Wrinkles (1976)
- The Great Goddess (1977)
- Double Strength (1978)
- Home (1978)
- Haircut (1978)
- Available Space (1978)
- Sappho (1978)
- Dream Age (1979)
- Take Back the Night March on Broadway, 1979 (1979)
- Our Trip (1980)
- Lesbian Humor: A Collection of Short Films (1980–1987)
- Pictures for Barbara (1980)
- Machu Picchu (1980)
- Natura Erotica (1980)
- See What You Hear What You See (1980)
- Our Trip (1981)
- Arequipa (1981)
- Pools (1981) – with B. Klutinis
- Synch-Touch (1981)
- The Lesbos Film (1981)
- Pond and Waterfall (1982)
- Audience (1983)
- See What You Hear What You See (1983)
- Stone Circles (1983)
- New York Loft (1983)
- Bamboo Xerox (1984)
- Pearl Diver (1984)
- Bent Time (1984)
- Doll House (1984)
- Parisian Blinds (1984)
- Tourist (1984–85)
- Optic Nerve (1985)
- Hot Flash (1985)
- Would You Like to Meet Your Neighbor? A New York Subway Tape (1985)
- Bedtime Stories (1986)
- The History of the World According to a Lesbian (1986)
- Snow Job: The Media Hysteria of AIDS (1986)
- No No Nooky T.V. (1987)
- Place Mattes (1987)
- Endangered (1988)
- Drive, She Said (1988)
- Two Bad Daughters (1988)
- Still Point (1989)
- T.V. Tart (1989)
- Sanctus (1990)
- Vital Signs (1991)
- Dr. Watson's X-Rays (1991)
- Nitrate Kisses (1992)
- Save Sex (1993)
- Shirley Temple and Me (1993)
- Out in South Africa (1994)
- Tender Fictions (1996)
- The Female Closet (1997)
- Blue Film No. 6: Love Is Where You Find It (1998)
- Devotion: A Film About Ogawa Productions (2000)
- History Lessons (2000)
- My Babushka: Searching Ukrainian Identities (2001)
- Our Grief Is Not a Cry for War (2001)
- Resisting Paradise (2003)
- Love/Other (2005)
- Diving Women of Jeju-Do (2007)
- Fucking Different New York (2007) (segment: "Villa Serbolloni")
- A Horse Is Not a Metaphor (2009) (Teddy Award-winner)
- Generations (2010)
- Maya Deren's Sink (2011)
- Welcome to This House (2015)
- Lesbian Whale (2015)
- Evidentiary Bodies (2018)

=== Retrospectives ===
- La Virreina Centre de la Imatge, Barcelona, Spain (9 June 2020 – October 18, 2020)
- "Barbara Hammer: In This Body", Wexner Center for the Arts at Ohio State University, Columbus, Ohio (2019)
- "Color Me Barbara", Retrospective at NewsFest, New York City, New York (2019)
- Museum of the Moving Image, Queens, New York (2019)
- Austrian Film Museum, Vienna, Austria (2018)
- Whitney Museum of Art, New York City, New York (October 10, 2018)
- Leslie Lohman Museum of Gay and Lesbian Art, New York City, New York (2017)
- National Gallery of Art, Washington, D.C. (2015)
- Kunsthall Oslo, Oslo, Norway (2013)
- Toronto International Film Festival Cinematheque Free Screen, Toronto, Canada (Winter 2013)
- Jeu de paume, Paris, France (June 12 – July 1, 2012)
- Tate Modern, London, England (February 3 – 26, 2012)
- Museum of Modern Art, New York City, New York (September 15 – October 13, 2010)
- XII Muestra Internacional de Cine Realizado por Mujeres, Zaragosa, Spain (2009)
- Universidad Complutense, Madrid, Spain (2008)
- Chinese Culture University, Taipei, Taiwan (2007)
- Turin International Gay & Lesbian Film Festival, Turin, Italy (2006)
- Mar del Plata International Film Festival, Mar del Plata, Argentina (2005)
- Irish Film Centre, Dublin, Ireland (2004)
- Australia Centre for the Moving Image, Melbourne, Australia (2003)
- Seoul Art Cinema, Seoul, Korea (2002)
- Women Make Waves Film/Video Festival, Taipei, Taiwan (2002)
- Women Make Waves Film/Video Festival, Taipei, Taiwan (2000)
- Immaginaria, 6th Women's Film Festival, Bologna, Italy (1998)
- yyz Gallery, Toronto, Canada (1997)
- Out in South Africa Film Festival, Johannesburg/Cape Town, South Africa (1994)
- Film Forum, Directors Guild of America, Los Angeles, California (1993)
- Sheldon Memorial Art Gallery, University of Nebraska–Lincoln, Lincoln, Nebraska (1993)
- Sheldon Memorial Art Gallery, University of Nebraska–Lincoln, Lincoln, Nebraska (1992)
- Retrospective: Film Forum, Directors Guild of America, Los Angeles (1991)
- Panorama, The Berlin International Film Festival, Berlin, Germany (1986)
- Musée National d'Art Moderne, Centre Georges Pompidou, Paris, France (1985)

== See also ==
- List of female film and television directors
- List of lesbian filmmakers
- List of LGBT-related films directed by women
