= Safe Horizon =

U.S. nonprofit organization

- Founded: May 26, 1978; 48 years ago
- Founded at: New York City, U.S.
- Type: Non-profit
- Tax ID no.: 13-2946970
- Legal status: 501(c)(3)
- Purpose: To provide support, prevent violence, and promote justice for victims of crime and abuse, their families, and communities.
- Headquarters: 2 Lafayette Street, 3rd Floor, New York, New York 10007
- Services: Victim services
- Chair: Michael C. Slocum
- Chief Executive Officer: Liz Roberts
- Subsidiaries: Houston Housing Development Fund Corporation (501(c)(3))
- Revenue: $64,719,293 (2017)
- Expenses: $63,151,365 (2017)
- Endowment: 130,428 _{(2017)}
- Employees: 876 (2016)
- Volunteers: 250 (2016)
- Website: www.safehorizon.org
- Formerly called: Victim Services Agency

Safe Horizon, formerly the Victim Services Agency, is the largest victim services nonprofit organization in the United States, providing social services for victims of abuse and violent crime. Operating at 57 locations throughout the five boroughs of New York City. Safe Horizon provides social services to over 250,000 victims of violent crime and abuse and their families per year. It has over 800 employees, and has programs for victims of domestic violence, child abuse, sexual assault, and human trafficking, as well as homeless youth and the families of homicide victims. Safe Horizon's website has been accessible for the Spanish-speaking population since 2012. Safe Horizon has an annual budget of over $63 million.

== History ==
In 1975, a pilot program called the Victim/Witness Assistance Project (V/WAP) started in Brooklyn's Criminal Court. The project was sponsored by Vera Institute of Justice and directed by Herb Sturz. It began as a computerized case management system to expedite court appearance notifications, save civilian and police wasted trips to court, and increase civilian court appearance rates.

In 1978, Mayor Ed Koch authorized the absorption of V/WAP into the Victim Service Agency (VSA), which reported directly to Sturz (then NYC Deputy Mayor of Criminal Justice) and Lucy N. Friedman as its director. One aspect of VSA was to administer restitution programs in Brooklyn and Bronx criminal courts.

By 1981, the VSA provided programs for victims of domestic violence, offering them shelter, counseling, and concrete support. Over the next three decades, the VSA provides additional programs to assist victims and their families during times of crisis.

In 2000, VSA spun off and incorporated as Safe Horizon with Lucy N. Friedman as its founding president. It offered a broad array of services that helped more victims of crime and abuse.

Today, Safe Horizon is the largest organization helping victims of crime and abuse in the United States, helping more than 250,000 children, adults, and families each year. Since 2021, Safe Horizon has been under the leadership of Chief Executive Officer Liz Roberts. Stephanie March has served as a member of Safe Horizon's Board.

The organization started by helping crime victims and witnesses in court. Over time, it expanded its services. By 1981, it offered shelter, counseling, and practical help to victims of domestic violence. Later, it also created programs for other victims, including homeless young people and families of murder victims. Safe Horizon has worked with the New York City Police Department for many years to help crime victims. In 2016, they started the Crime Victim Assistance Program to help victims of different crimes with safety, support, referrals, and the justice system.

== Mission ==
Safe Horizon's stated mission is to provide support, prevent violence and promote justice for victims of crime and abuse, their families, and communities. Safe Horizon helps people during emergencies and also gives long-term support. It provides emergency shelter, basic needs, mental health counseling, help with housing and jobs, legal help, and support with the justice system.

== Hotlines ==
Safe Horizon operates four hotlines: a 24-hour Domestic Violence Hotline; a Crime Victims Hotline; a Rape, Sexual Assault, and Incest Hotline; and a Centralized Helpline. These hotlines are multilingual, with over 150 languages available.

Safe Horizon also helps victims of domestic violence through New York City's courts. Its Family Court and Criminal Court programs help survivors manage their cases, make safety plans, understand court procedures, get protection orders, and find shelters and counseling. They also help survivors work with prosecutors and court staff. At the Manhattan Family Justice Center, survivors can receive case management, counseling, financial support, and legal help with civil and criminal cases.

== Domestic violence services ==
Safe Horizon helps tens of thousands of domestic violence survivors every year, through hotlines, court programs, community offices, and shelters. Safe Horizon is the U.S.'s largest operator of domestic violence shelters, with nine shelters located throughout the five boroughs of New York City. A domestic violence shelter was named in honor of Safe Horizon Board Member Steven C. Parrish in 2008.

== Child advocacy centers ==
In 1996, Safe Horizon opened the United States's first fully co-located Child Advocacy Center.

Safe Horizon is the U.S.'s largest operator of child advocacy centers in an urban setting, with five fully accredited Child Advocacy Centers, located in Manhattan, Brooklyn, Staten Island, Queens and the Bronx.

Safe Horizon has helped victimized children overcome the trauma of abuse, partnering with the Yale Child Study Center on a new treatment, the Child and Family Traumatic Stress Intervention (CFTSI). CFTSI, a short-term therapy treatment that involves the participation of the non-offending caregiver, has been found to remarkably reduce the trauma symptoms of abused children.

== Anti-trafficking program ==
Safe Horizon's Anti-Trafficking Program (ATP) meets practical needs for victims of human trafficking, such as food, clothing, and shelter, as well as legal assistance. ATP was established in 2001 and has helped clients and provided intelligence to authorities allowing law enforcement to locate traffickers since its very beginnings. Florrie R. Burke helped to found ATP.

ATP has represented the victims in several high-profile cases in recent years, including María Ríos Fun and Sangeeta Richard

ATP is supported by the federal Office of Justice's Office for Victims of Crime. Safe Horizon is a member of Global Alliance Against Traffic in Women.

== Streetwork Project ==
Safe Horizon's Streetwork Project provides homeless youth with food, clothing, shower and laundry facilities, HIV testing, counseling, emergency shelter and more. Staff work with clients towards long-term housing solutions and treatment for medical and mental health problems. Ali Forney was a client of Safe Horizon's Streetwork Project.

== Community programs ==
Safe Horizon operates four Community Program offices, in Brooklyn, Queens, Staten Island, and Manhattan (which also serves the Bronx).

== Counseling center ==
Safe Horizon's Counseling Center is an out-patient mental health clinic focused specifically on treating survivors of trauma. It is the only New York State-licensed mental health clinic specializing exclusively in treating traumatized victims of crime and abuse.

== Law projects ==
In addition to ATP's legal work for victims of human trafficking, Safe Horizon's Domestic Violence Law Project (DVLP) and Immigration Law Project (ILP) provide low-cost and free legal aid for victims of domestic violence and immigrant victims of abuse or torture.

Since its inception, DVLP has provided legal advocacy and representation to thousands of low-income victims of domestic violence in family justice proceedings such for orders of protection, custody, support, and divorce proceedings. DVLP also advocates for clients within the criminal justice system.

== Project Safe ==
Safe Horizon's Project Safe provides free lock changes to victims of crime who have reason to believe the perpetrators may have access to their homes. In most cases, lock changes are available within 24 to 48 hours.

== 9/11 disaster relief ==
From September 11, 2001, through June 2008, Safe Horizon provided disaster relief to the victims of 9/11 and their families through the Family Assistance Center. As one of the largest charities assisting victims, Safe Horizon provided counseling to hundreds of thousands of those affected, and hundreds of millions in relief dollars.

== Other related-items ==
In 2025, Safe Horizon’s five Child Advocacy Centers helped about 12,000 children and their family members. The centers provide a safe place where abused children can talk about their experiences and get the help and support they need.

=== Safe Way Forward ===
Safe Horizon also offers Safe Way Forward, a program that helps adults and children affected by domestic violence make safety plans. It also supports people who have harmed family members.

=== Child advocacy centers ===
Safe Horizon’s Child Advocacy Centers help children who have suffered physical or sexual abuse talk about their experiences and get the support they need. They also help and support the children’s families.

=== Anti-trafficking program ===
The Anti-Trafficking Program provides legal and social support to people who have experienced sex or labor trafficking. It helps people of all ages, genders, languages, and immigration statuses. Services include counseling, help with basic needs, finding housing and public benefits, legal support, training, and advice.

=== Streetwork Project ===
The Streetwork Project runs two centers for homeless young people. These centers provide hot meals, showers, clothes, medical care, sexual health services, and other help. The project also offers overnight shelter and outreach teams that visit places where young people gather to provide food and connect them with support services.
