= Nitrate Kisses =

1992 film by Barbara Hammer

- Directed by: Barbara Hammer
- Written by: Barbara Hammer
- Produced by: Barbara Hammer
- Narrated by: Barbara Hammer
- Cinematography: Barbara Hammer
- Edited by: Barbara Hammer
- Distributed by: Frameline; Strand Releasing
- Release dates: September 12, 1992 (Toronto); April 9, 1993 (United States)
- Running time: 67 minutes
- Country: United States
- Language: English

Nitrate Kisses is a 1992 experimental documentary film directed by Barbara Hammer. According to Hammer, it is an exploration of the repression and marginalization of LGBT people since the First World War. To celebrate the 30th anniversary of the Teddy Awards, the film was selected to be shown at the 66th Berlin International Film Festival in February 2016.

== Overview ==
Nitrate Kisses combines interviews with homosexual couples, videos of four couples making love, footage of 1933 homoerotic film Lot in Sodom and images of LGBT history. The couples making love are two elderly lesbians, an interracial gay male couple, two young pierced and tattooed women of color and an S/M lesbian couple. The scenes of the gay male couple are overlaid with the Motion Picture Production Code.

Part of the film focuses on the story of American novelist Willa Cather, who destroyed many personal letters and papers before her death; the film argues that Cather was covering up evidence of lesbianism. Another section explores the treatment of lesbians by the Third Reich.

== Background ==
Hammer received funding from the National Endowment for the Arts to help finance Nitrate Kisses, which was her first feature film. She decided she wanted to make a film about the most marginalized groups within the queer community. When choosing which couples to film having sex, she decided to feature a mixed-race couple and asked two friends of hers, Jack Waters and Peter Cramer. She then met a young lesbian couple who were both women of color, and were pierced and tattooed, with shaved heads. She filmed them making love in a sculpture of a burnt-out house, which Hammer felt represented "a history we don't have." Next, she met a lesbian couple who arrived to shoot their scene with S/M paraphernalia. When looking for her fourth couple, Hammer decided that she wanted to explore ageism in the lesbian community. She went to an awards ceremony for older lesbians and chose a woman called Frances Lorraine who performed in the film with a friend. In an interview for Alexandra Juhasz's book Women of Vision: Histories in Feminist Film and Video, Hammer called Nitrate Kisses her best work.

== Distribution and reception ==
Nitrate Kisses premiered at the Toronto Festival of Festivals on September 12, 1992, and has been shown at several other film festivals internationally. It was shown theatrically in New York City, Los Angeles, San Francisco, Chicago and Austin, distributed by Strand Releasing. It was released on VHS on December 16, 1998.

It was nominated for the Grand Jury Prize at the 1993 Sundance Film Festival. It won the Polar Bear Award at the Berlin International Film Festival and the Best Documentary Award at the Internacional de Cine Realizado por Mujeres in Madrid.
